= Cradle =

Cradle or Cradles may refer to:

- Cradle (bed)
- Bassinet, a small bed, often on rockers, in which babies and small children sleep

== Mechanical devices ==
- Cradle (circus act), or aerial cradle or casting cradle used in an aerial circus act
- Cradling (paintings), an art restoration technique to stabilise a painting on panel
- Docking station, also known as a cradle for the connection of a mobile device
- Ship cradle, for supporting a ship when dry docked
- Grain cradle, an addition to the agricultural scythe to keep the grain stems aligned when mowing
- Neck cradle, a type of Elizabethan collar used to prevent convalescent horses from biting their wounds
- Newton's cradle, a device that demonstrates conservation of momentum and energy via a series of swinging spheres
- Rocker box, also known as a cradle used in mining to separate gold from alluvium
- Suspended cradle, a platform for accessing the exterior of buildings, used by among others by window cleaners
- Slip catching cradle. a device used by cricketers to practice taking catches

== A metaphor for humanity's origins ==
- Cradle of Humankind, a World Heritage Site near Johannesburg in South Africa, where many early hominid remains were discovered
- Cradle of civilization, any of the various regions regarded as the earliest centers of civilization
- Cradle of Liberty (disambiguation)

== Geography ==
- Cradle Mountain, Tasmania
- Cradle Mountain-Lake St Clair National Park

== Music ==
- Cradle (Malay band), a Malay rock band from Singapore
- The Pleasure Seekers (band), formerly Cradle, a band that Suzi Quatro played in before she became famous
- Cradle (album), an album by Acacia
- "Cradle" (song), a 1999 song by Atomic Kitten
- "Cradle", a song by The Joy Formidable from The Big Roar
- "Cradle", a song by Mudvayne from L.D. 50
- Cradles (song), a song by Sub Urban

== Other arts ==
- Cradle (video game), a 2015 science-fiction adventure game developed by Flying Cafe
- Cradle (novel), a 1988 novel by Arthur C. Clarke and Gentry Lee
- Cradle, a book series by Will Wight
- Cradle (sculpture), a 2010 sculpture by Ball-Nogues Studio

== Other ==
- Cradle (wrestling), a very basic move in amateur wrestling

== See also ==
- The Cradle
