= Uno Troili =

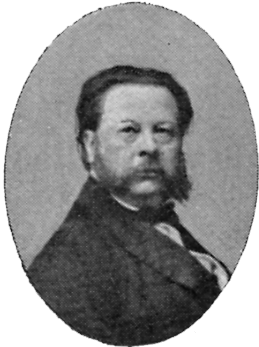
Uno Troili, from the Svenskt Porträttgalleri XX

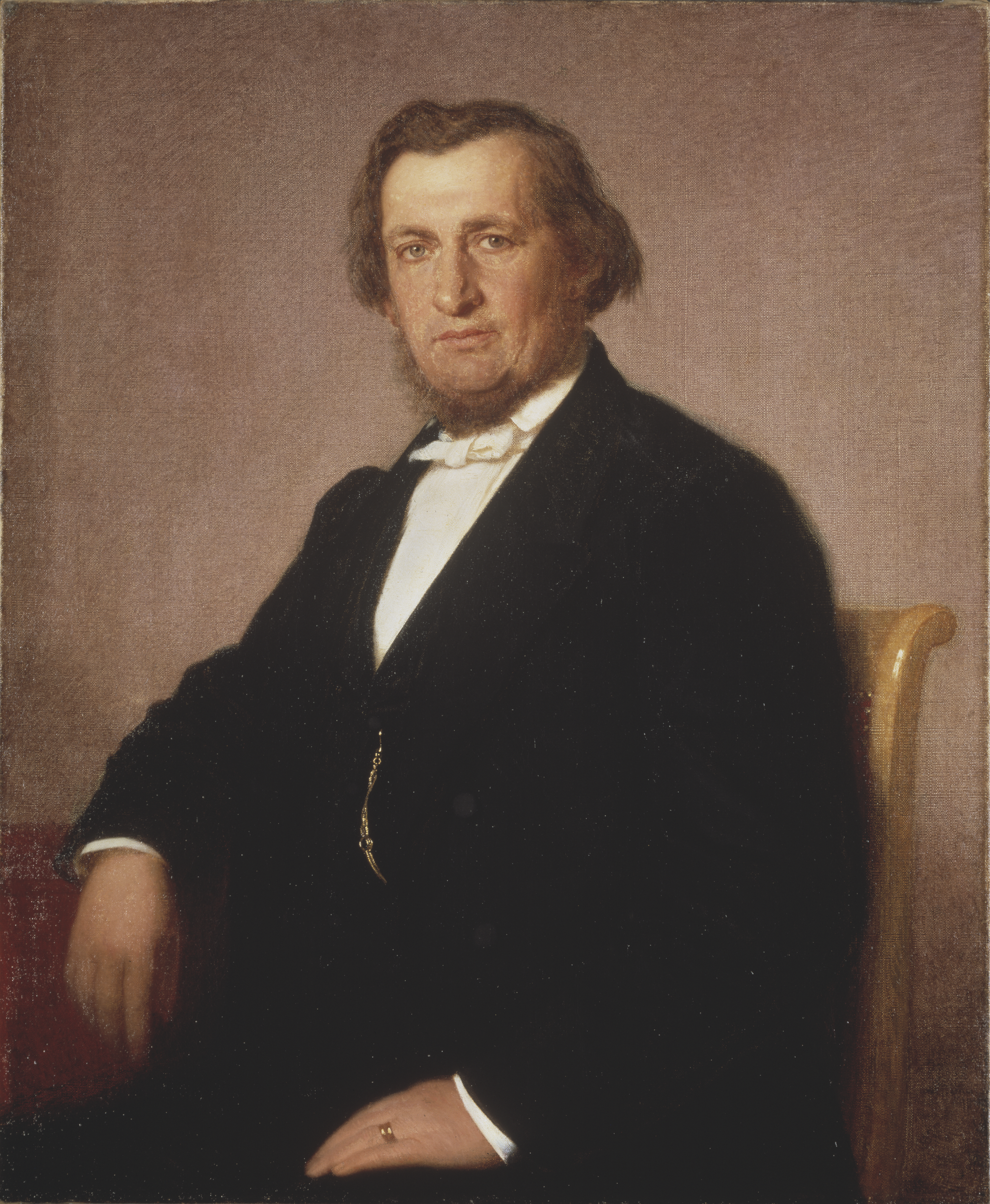
Portrait of André Oscar Wallenberg

Gustaf Uno Troili (16 January 1815 – 31 August 1875) was a Swedish portrait painter and musician.

== Biography ==
He was born in Ransäter. He was a member of the priestly Troilius family with a lineage dating back to the 16th century. He showed an early aptitude for music and art and began preparatory studies at the Royal Swedish Academy of Fine Arts in 1827. He became a full-time student in 1835 and was introduced to the local intelligentsia at the home of his uncle, the poet and philosopher Erik Gustaf Geijer. In 1837, he became a "furir" in the Värmland Rifle Corps and was promoted to Lieutenant in 1844.

While in service, he studied with his cousin, Captain Henrik Lilljebjörn (1797–1875), a part-time painter of little note. He also worked with then "överstelöjtnant", Olof Johan Södermark, who became a well known portrait painter and sculptor. Later, he would live with him in Stockholm and become a study mate of his son, Per Södermark. In the summer of 1845, they all moved to Rome.

In 1848, he resigned his commission and returned home. He immediately began receiving orders for portraits, and that soon became his sole occupation.

He 1857, he went to Paris to find some new inspiration and update his painting techniques. He enrolled in the master class of Thomas Couture and was deeply influenced by what he learned. The result was a lighter tone. with more contrast and vivid backgrounds.

At the Royal Academy, he became a member in 1854, vice professor in 1860 and full professor in 1866, but actually taught only briefly, in 1867, before requesting leave, then resigning. He was also an amateur composer and singer. In 1864, he was elected a member of the Royal Swedish Academy of Music. Only a few of his compositions were published, after his death.

During the last year of his life, he struggled with depression and self-criticism. He died in Stockholm in 1875.
