= Mechanised agriculture =

Agriculture using powered machinery

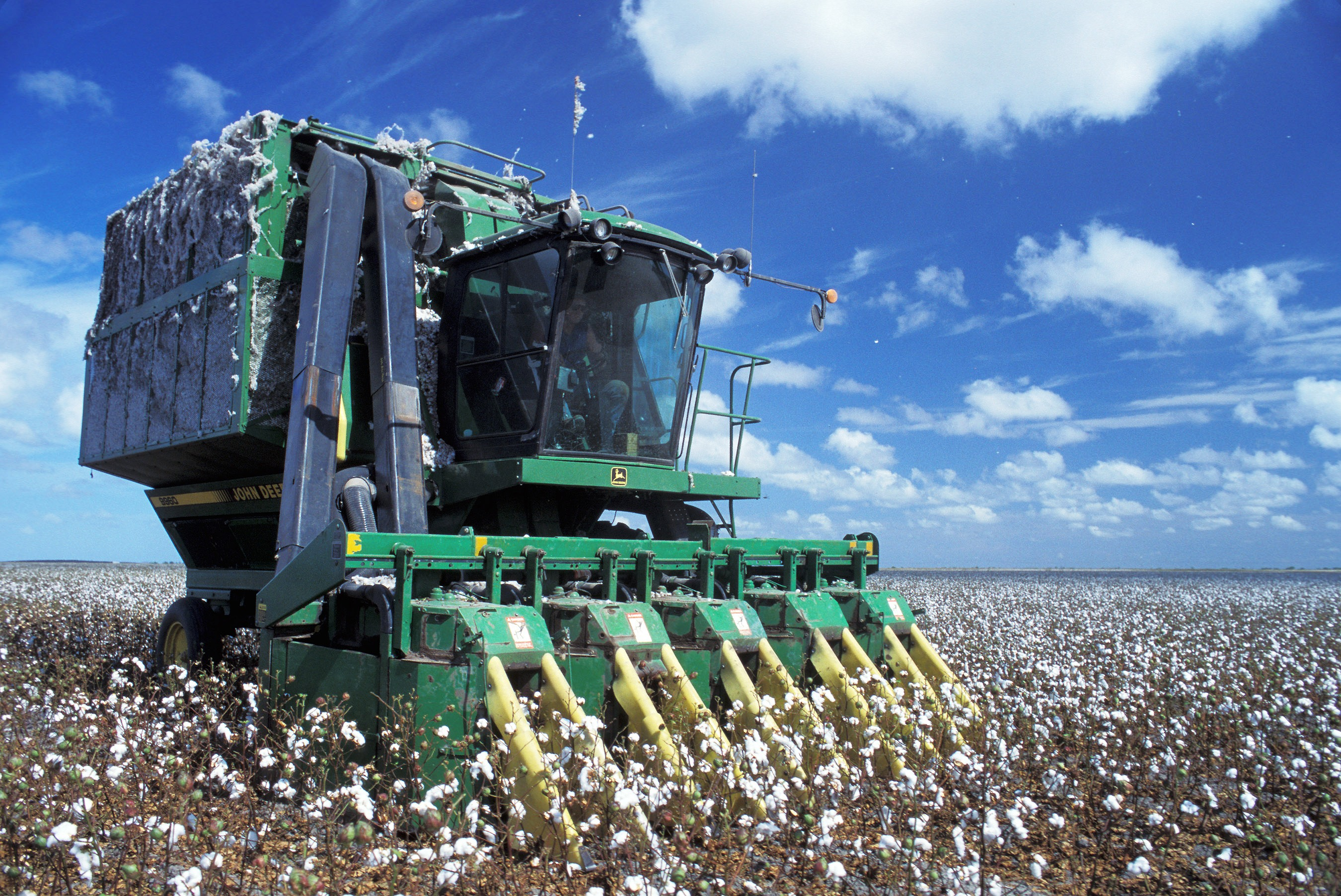
A cotton picker at work. The first successful models were introduced in the mid-1940s and each could do the work of 50 hand pickers.

Mechanised agriculture or agricultural mechanisation is the use of machinery and equipment, ranging from simple and basic hand tools to more sophisticated, motorised equipment and machinery, to perform agricultural operations. In modern times, powered machinery has replaced many farm task formerly carried out by manual labour or by working animals such as oxen, horses and mules.

The entire history of agriculture contains many examples of the use of tools, such as the hoe and the plough. The ongoing integration of machines since the Industrial Revolution has allowed farming to become much less labour-intensive.

Agricultural mechanisation is part of this technological evolution of agricultural automation. It can be summarised as a progressive move from manual tools to animal traction, to motorised mechanization, to digital equipment and finally, to robotics with artificial intelligence (AI). These advances can raise productivity and allow for more careful crop, livestock, aquaculture and forestry management; provide better working conditions; improve incomes; reduce the workload of farming; and generate new rural entrepreneurial opportunities.

Current mechanised agriculture includes the use of tractors, trucks, combine harvesters, countless types of farm implements, aeroplanes and helicopters (for aerial application), and other vehicles. Precision agriculture even uses computers in conjunction with satellite imagery and satellite navigation (GPS guidance) to increase yields. New digital equipment is increasingly complementing, or even superseding, motorised machines to make diagnosis and decision-making automatic.

Mechanisation was one of the large factors responsible for urbanisation and industrial economies. Besides improving production efficiency, mechanisation encourages large scale production and sometimes can improve the quality of farm produce. On the other hand, it can cause environmental degradation (such as pollution, deforestation, and soil erosion), especially if it is applied shortsightedly rather than holistically.

== History ==
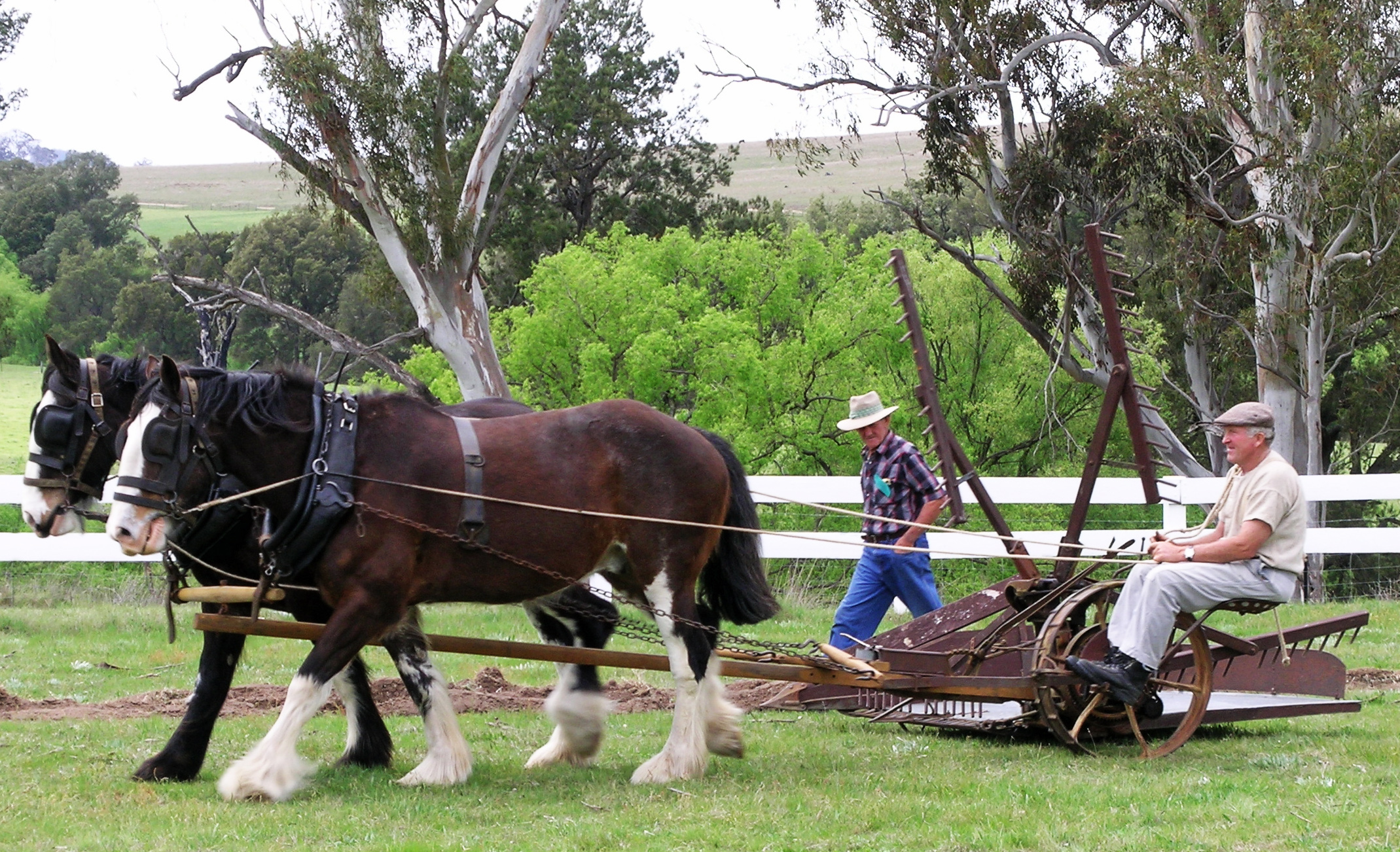
A reaper at Woolbrook, New South Wales

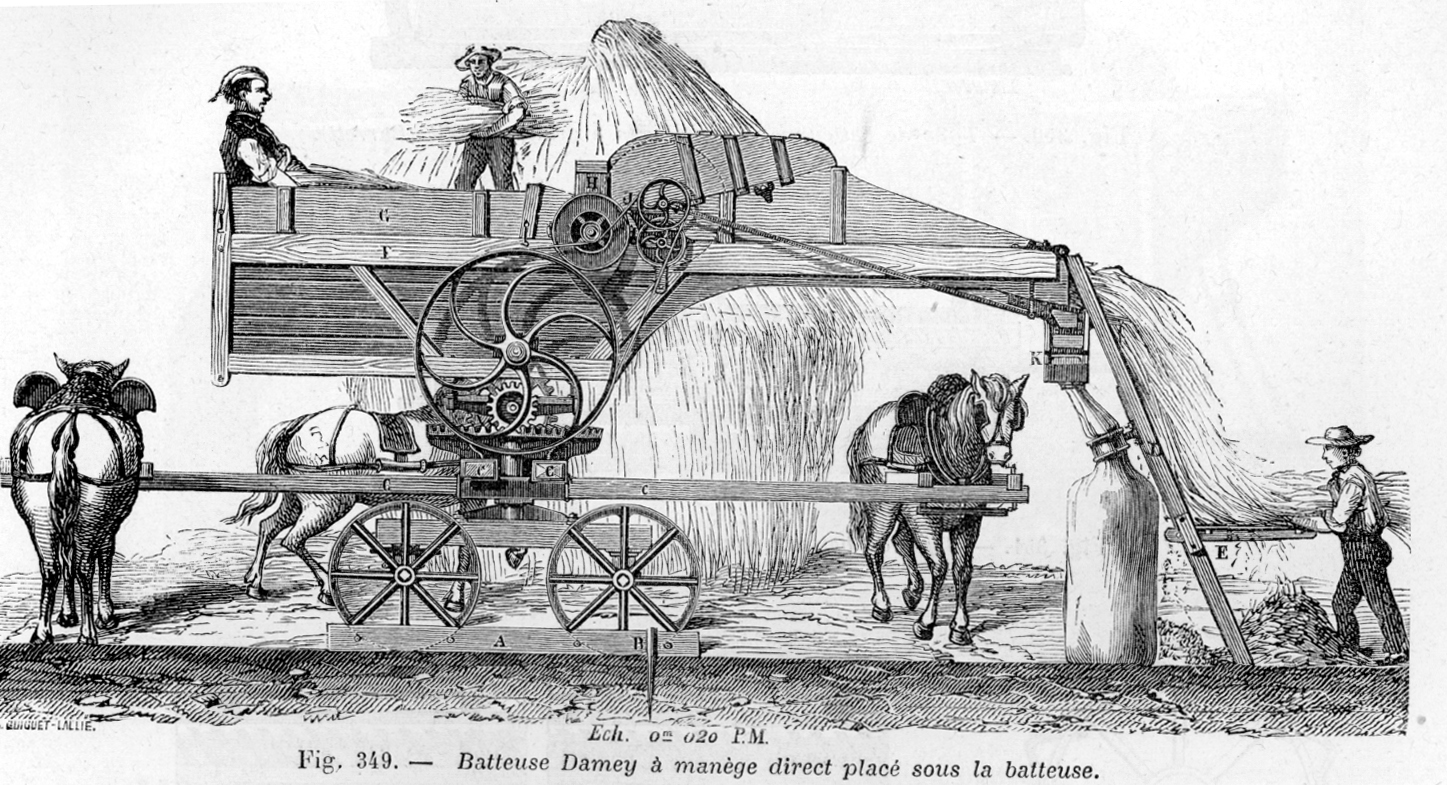
Threshing machine in 1881. Steam engines were also used to power threshing machines. Today both reaping and threshing are done with a combine harvester.

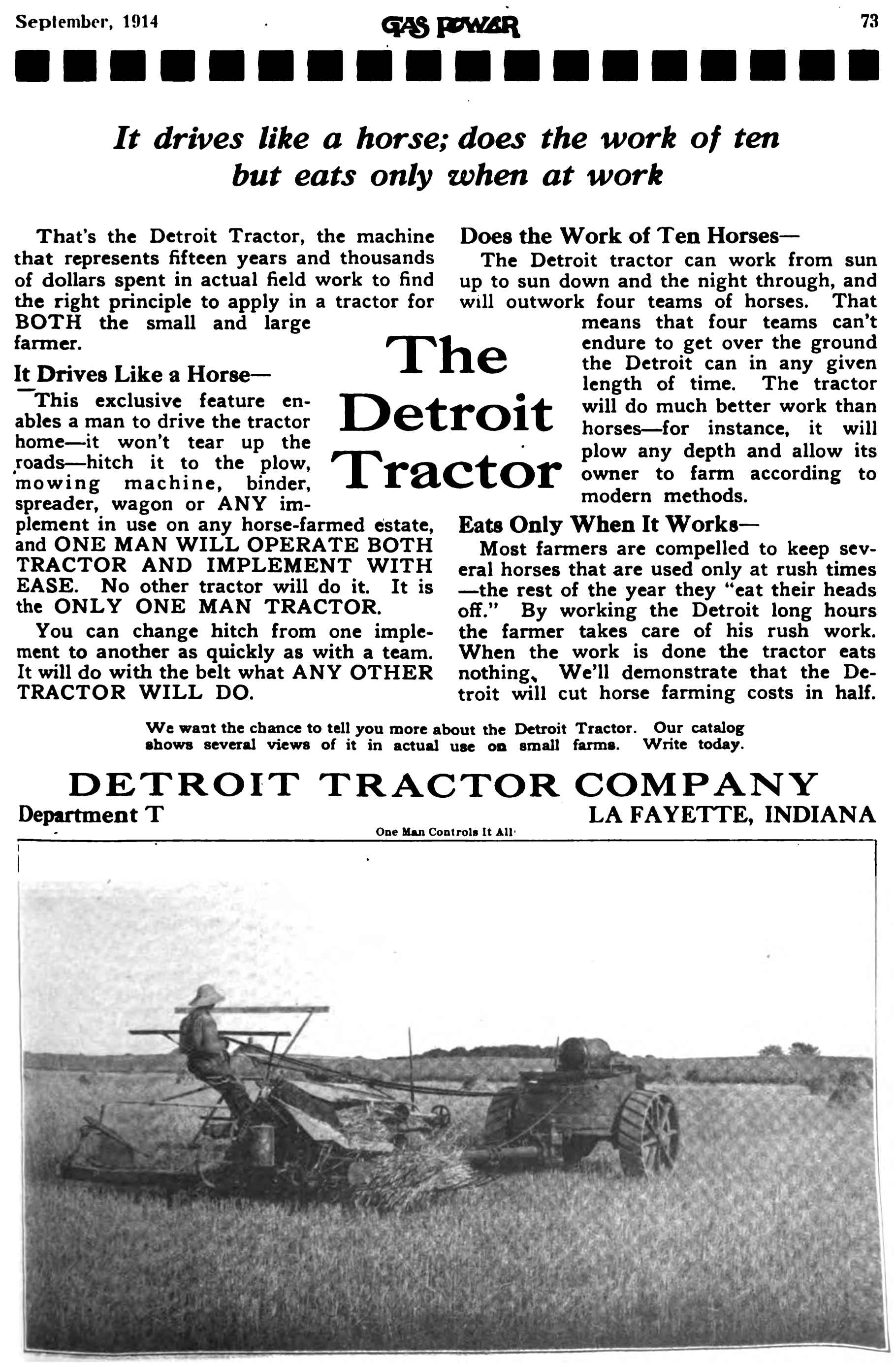
"Better and cheaper than horses" was the theme of many advertisements of the 1910s through 1930s.

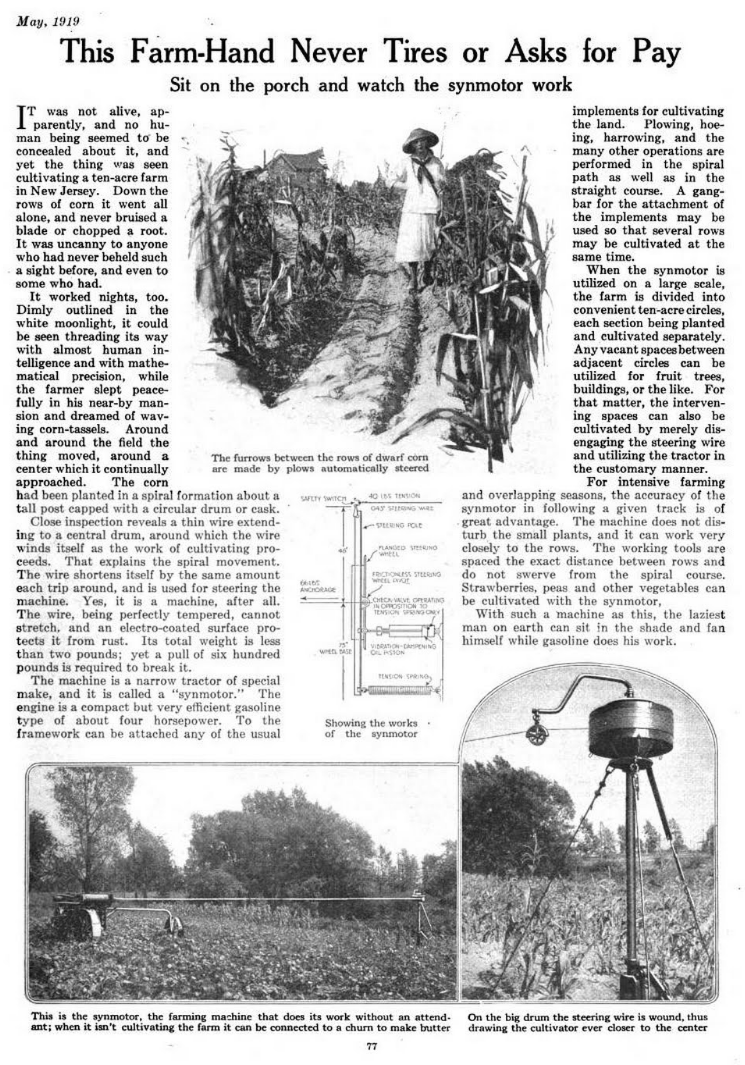
"This farm-hand never tires or asks for pay": A step on the road of agricultural mechanisation with a wire-guided gasoline-powered cultivator in 1919.

Jethro Tull's seed drill (c. 1701) was a mechanical seed spacing and depth placing device that increased crop yields and saved seed. It was an important factor in the British Agricultural Revolution.

Since the beginning of agriculture threshing was done by hand with a flail, requiring a great deal of labour. The threshing machine, which was invented in 1794 but not widely used for several more decades, simplified the operation and allowed the use of animal power. Before the invention of the grain cradle (ca. 1790) an able bodied labourer could reap about one quarter acre of wheat in a day using a sickle. It was estimated that each of Cyrus McCormick's horse-pulled reapers (ca. 1830s) freed up five men for military service in the US Civil War. Later innovations included raking and binding machines. By 1890 two men and two horses could cut, rake and bind 20 acres of wheat per day.

In the 1880s the reaper and threshing machine were combined into the combine harvester. These machines required large teams of horses or mules to pull. Steam power was applied to threshing machines in the late 19th century. There were steam engines that moved around on wheels under their own power for supplying temporary power to stationary threshing machines. These were called road engines, and Henry Ford seeing one as a boy was inspired to build an automobile.

With internal combustion came the first modern tractors in the early 1900s, becoming more popular after the Fordson tractor (ca. 1917). At first reapers and combine harvesters were pulled by teams of horses or tractors, but in the 1930s self powered combines were developed.

Advertising for motorised equipment in farm journals during this era did its best to compete against horse-drawn methods with economic arguments, extolling common themes such as that a tractor "eats only when it works", that one tractor could replace many horses, and that mechanisation could allow one man to get more work done per day than he ever had before. The horse population in the US began to decline in the 1920s after the conversion of agriculture and transportation to internal combustion. Peak tractor sales in the US were around 1950. In addition to saving labour, this freed up much land previously used for supporting draft animals. The greatest period of growth in agricultural productivity in the US was from the 1940s to the 1970s, during which time agriculture was benefiting from internal combustion powered tractors and combine harvesters, chemical fertilisers and the green revolution.

Although US farmers of corn, wheat, soy, and other commodity crops had replaced most of their workers with harvesting machines and combines by the 1950s enabling them to efficiently cut and gather grains, growers of produce continued to rely on human pickers to avoid the bruising of the product in order to maintain the blemish-free appearance demanded by customers. The continuous supply of undocumented workers from Latin America that harvest the crops for low wages further suppressed the need for mechanisation. As the number of undocumented workers has continued to decline since reaching its peak in 2007 due to increased border patrols and an improving Mexican economy, the industry is increasing the use of mechanisation. Proponents argue that mechanisation will boost productivity and help to maintain low food prices while farm worker advocates assert that it will eliminate jobs and will give an advantage to large growers who are able to afford the required equipment.

=== Motorised mechanisation adoption trends ===
Motorised mechanisation has substantially expanded at global level, although it has been unevenly and inadequately adopted particularly in sub-Saharan Africa. Mechanization is limited to a range of operations including harvesting and weeding and is rarely used for fruit and vegetable production across the globe.

Extensive adoption started in the United States of America, where tractors replaced about 24 million draught animals between 1910 and 1960 and became the main source of farm power. United Kingdom first started using tractors in the 1930s, but agricultural transformation in Japan and some European countries (Denmark, France, Germany, Spain and former Yugoslavia) did not take place until about 1955. Thereafter, the adoption of motorised mechanization took place very quickly, completely superseding animal traction. Using tractors as farm power enabled, and even triggered, innovations in other agricultural machinery and equipment that greatly eased the toil associated with agriculture and allowed farmers to carry out tasks more quickly. At a later stage, motorised machinery also increased in many Asian and Latin American countries.

Sub-Saharan Africa is the only region where adoption of motorised mechanization has not progressed over the past decades. A study in 11 countries proves this low level of mechanisation in the region, finding that only 18 per cent of the sampled households have access to tractor-powered appliances. The remaining ones make use of either simple hand-held tools (48 per cent) or animal-powered equipment (33 per cent).

=== Employment impact ===
Since at least the early nineteenth century there have been concerns over the possible negative socioeconomic impacts of labour-saving technological change, particularly job displacement resulting in unemployment. However, fears that automation increases labour productivity to the extent that it causes massive unemployment are not supported by historical realities. Instead, innovation and incorporation of labour-saving technologies tends to take long, and automation of one task often spurs increases in the need for workers to perform other jobs. The direct impact of automation on employment will be determined by the factors leading to its adoption.

If rising wages and labour scarcities drive the adoption of automation then it is not likely to create unemployment. Automation can also stimulate agricultural employment. For example, it can enable farms to increase their production following growing food demand. Agricultural automation is part of the structural transformation of societies through which increased agricultural labour productivity gradually releases agricultural workers, giving them the opportunity to take new jobs in other sectors, including industry and services. On the other hand, automation that is forcibly promoted, such as through government subsidies, could cause rising unemployment and falling or stagnant wages.

The Food and Agriculture Organization of the United Nations (FAO) advises against governments implementing distortive subsidies for automation because doing so risks increasing unemployment. FAO also advises against restricting automation on the assumption that this will save jobs and incomes, because it risks making agriculture less competitive and productive. Instead, the recommendation is to concentrate on creating an enabling environment to adopt automation – particularly by small-scale agricultural producers, women and youth – while making social protection available to least skilled workers, who are more likely to lose their jobs during the transition.

== Applications ==
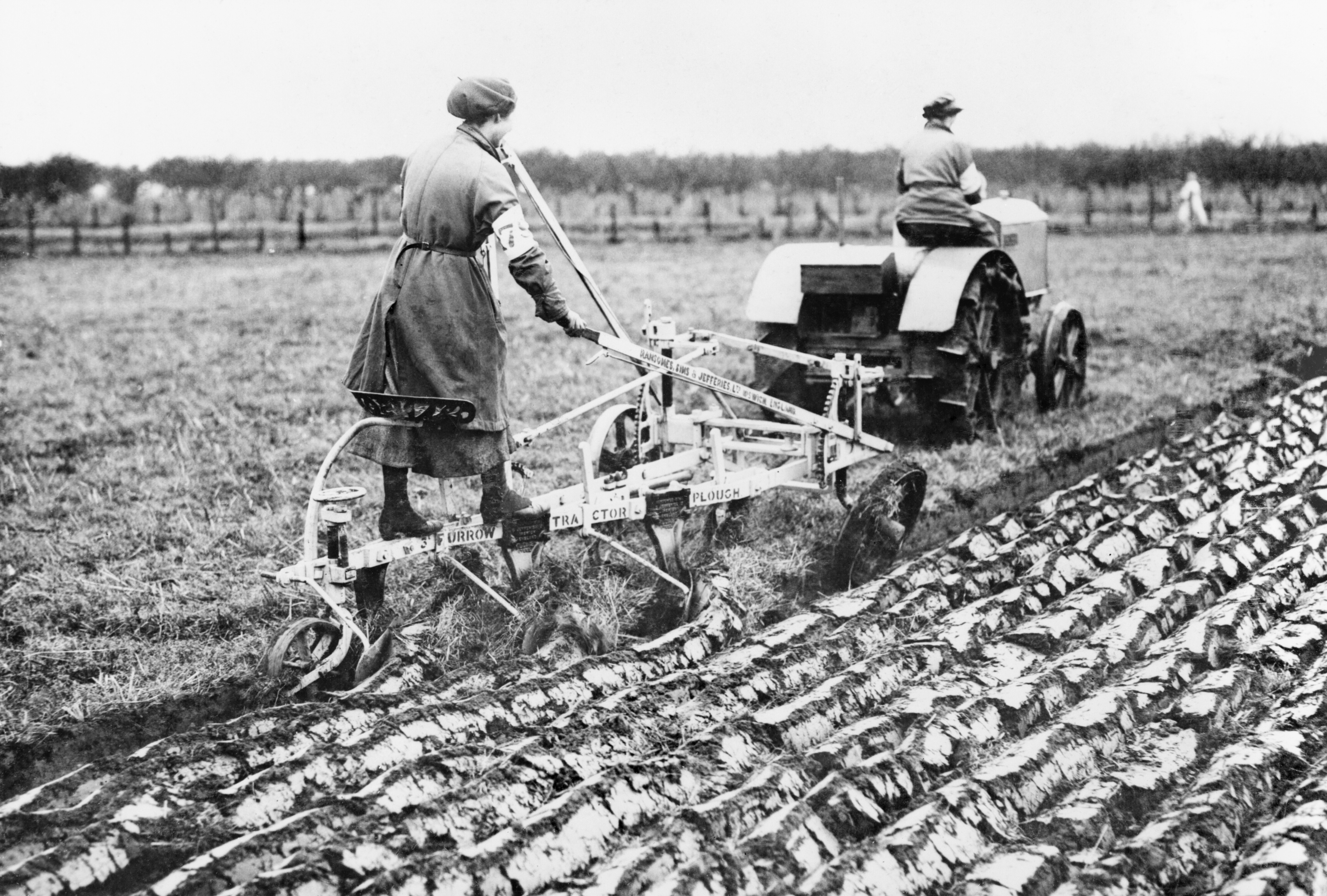
A tractor pulling a three-furrow plough during World War I.

=== Seed drilling, planting ===
It is done by the seed drill. The plantation of seeds depends upon the season.

=== Harvesting ===
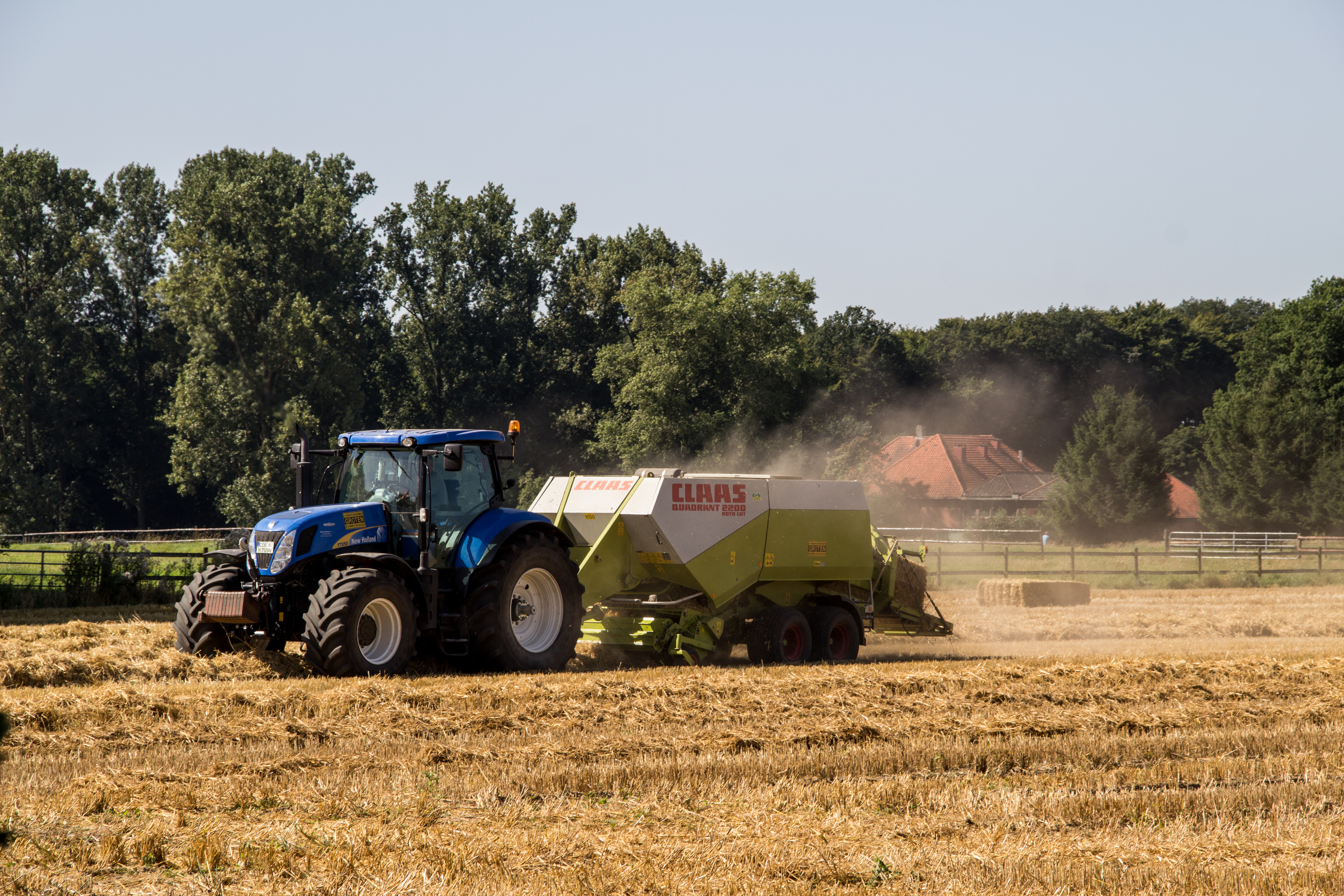
A tractor towing a baler makes hay bales in a field in Germany.

Asparagus are presently harvested by hand with labour costs at 71% of production costs and 44% of selling costs. Asparagus is a difficult crop to harvest since each spear matures at a different speed making it difficult to achieve a uniform harvest. A prototype asparagus harvesting machine – using a light-beam sensor to identify the taller spears – is expected to be available for commercial use.

Mechanization of Maine's blueberry industry has reduced the number of migrant workers required from 5,000 in 2005 to 1,500 in 2015 even though production has increased from 50 to 60 million lb (23,000 to 27,000 t) per year in 2005 to 90 million lb (41,000 t) in 2015.

As of 2014, prototype chili pepper harvesters are being tested by New Mexico State University. The New Mexico green chile crop is currently hand-picked entirely by field workers as chili pods tend to bruise easily. The first commercial application commenced in 2015. The equipment is expected to increase yield per acre and help to offset a sharp decline in acreage planted due to the lack of available labour and drought conditions.

As of 2010, approximately 10% of the processing orange acreage in Florida is harvested mechanically, mainly with citrus canopy shaker machines. Mechanization has progressed slowly due to the uncertainty of future economic benefits due to competition from Brazil and the transitory damage to orange trees when they are harvested.

There has been an ongoing transition to mechanical harvesting of cling peaches (mostly used in canning) where the cost of labour is 70 per cent of a grower's direct costs. In 2016, 12 per cent of the cling peach tonnage from Yuba County and Sutter County in California will be mechanically harvested. Fresh peaches destined for direct customer sales must still be hand-picked.

As of 2007, mechanised harvesting of raisins is at 45%; however the rate has slowed due to high raisin demand and prices making the conversion away from hand labour less urgent. A new strain of grape developed by the USDA that drys on the vine and is easily harvested mechanically is expected to reduce the demand for labour.

Strawberries are a high cost-high value crop with the economics supporting mechanisation. In 2005, picking and hauling costs were estimated at $594 per ton or 51% of the total grower cost. However, the delicate nature of fruit make it an unlikely candidate for mechanisation in the near future. A strawberry harvester developed by Shibuya Seiki and unveiled in Japan in 2013 is able to pick a strawberry every eight seconds. The robot identifies which strawberries are ready to pick by using three separate cameras and then once identified as ready, a mechanised arm snips the fruit free and gently places it in a basket. The robot moves on rails between the rows of strawberries which are generally contained within elevated greenhouses. The machine costs 5 million yen. A new strawberry harvester made by Agrobot that will harvest strawberries on raised, hydroponic beds using 60 robotic arms is expected to be released in 2016.

Mechanical harvesting of tomatoes started in 1965 and as of 2010, nearly all processing tomatoes are mechanically harvested. As of 2010, 95% of the US processed tomato crop is produced in California. Although fresh market tomatoes have substantial hand harvesting costs (in 2007, the costs of hand picking and hauling were $86 per ton which is 19% of total grower cost), packing and selling costs were more of a concern (at 44% of total grower cost) making it likely that cost saving efforts would be applied there.

According to a 1977 report by the California Agrarian Action Project, during the summer of 1976 in California, many harvest machines had been equipped with a photo-electric scanner that sorted out green tomatoes among the ripe red ones using infrared lights and colour sensors. It worked in lieu of 5,000 hand harvesters causing displacement of innumerable farm labourers as well as wage cuts and shorter work periods. Migrant workers were hit the hardest. To withstand the rigour of the machines, new crop varieties were bred to match the automated pickers. UC Davis Professor G.C. Hanna propagated a thick-skinned tomato called VF-145. But even still, millions were damaged with impact cracks and university breeders produced a tougher and juiceless "square round" tomato. Small farms were of insufficient size to obtain financing to purchase the equipment and within 10 years, 85% of the state's 4,000 cannery tomato farmers were out of the business. This led to a concentrated tomato industry in California that "now packed 85% of the nation’s tomato products". The monoculture fields fostered rapid pest growth, requiring the use of "more than four million pounds of pesticides each year" which greatly affected the health of the soil, the farm workers, and possibly the customers.

== See also ==
- Farm equipment
- Industrial agriculture
- List of agricultural machinery
- Agricultural Engineering
- Agricultural drones
- Agricultural robot

== Sources ==
This article incorporates text from a free content work. Licensed under CC BY-SA 3.0. Text taken from In Brief to The State of Food and Agriculture 2022 – Leveraging automation in agriculture for transforming agrifood systems, FAO, FAO.
