= Rasidi =

Rasidi may refer to:

- Addy Rasidi (born 1975), Singaporean guitarist
- Sunarto Rasidi (born 1975), Indonesian weightlifter
- Weny Rasidi (born 1983), French badminton player
