= Otowa Yurikago Kai =

Japanese children's choir

Otowa Yurikago Kai (Japanese: 音羽ゆりかご会) is a Japanese children's choir, established in 1933. It is named for Otowa-cho, a place name in Bunkyō, Tokyo, where it was born, Yurikago, a Japanese word for cradle, and Kai, meaning an association or group.

From 1943 to 1951, it also was NHK Tokyo Children's Choir, attached to the Tokyo Broadcasting Station (JOAK) of the NHK - Japan Broadcasting Corporation radio network. They are also well known for doing several theme songs for anime and tokusatsu shows, going by the name Columbia Yurikago Kai, so named because they had a deal with Nippon Columbia.

In 1990, it appeared in an independent concert at Carnegie Hall in New York City.

== See also ==
- Beijing Angelic Choir
- Vienna Boys' Choir
