= Scythe =

Agricultural reaping hand tool

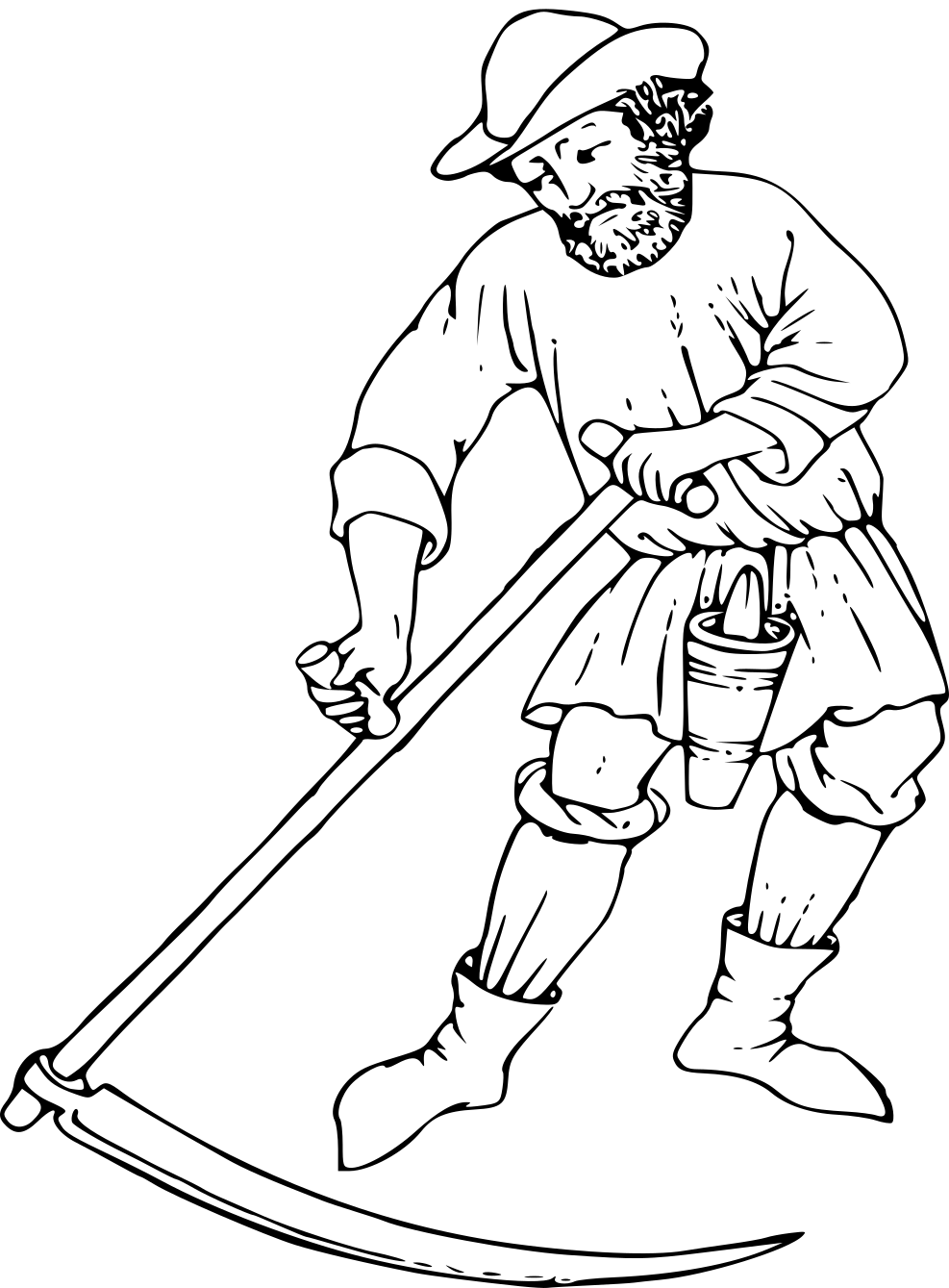
Typical stance; the pouch at belt contains a whetstone.

Parts of a scythe: 1. Toe; 2. Chine; 3. Beard; 4. Heel; 5. Tang; 6. Ring; 7. Snath or snaith; 8. Grips

A scythe (/saɪð/, /saɪθ/) is an agricultural hand-tool for mowing grass or harvesting crops. It was historically used to cut down or reap edible grains before they went through the process of threshing. Horse-drawn and then tractor machinery largely replaced the scythe, but it is still used in some areas of Europe and Asia, especially in Yakutia, Siberia. Reapers are bladed machines that automate the cutting action of the scythe, and sometimes include subsequent steps in preparing the grain or the straw or hay.

The word "scythe" derives from Old English siðe. In Middle English and later, it was usually spelled sithe or sythe. However, in the 15th century some writers began to use the sc- spelling as they thought that the word was related to the Latin scindere (meaning "to cut"). Nevertheless, the sithe spelling lingered, and notably appears in Noah Webster's dictionaries.

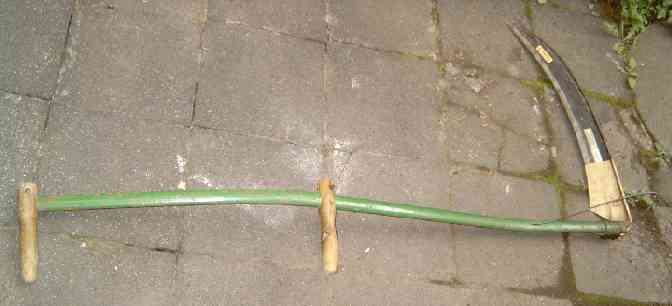
A modern scythe of a pattern common in parts of Europe

A scythe consists of a shaft called a snaith, snath, snathe or sned, traditionally made of wood but now sometimes of metal. Simple snaiths are straight with offset handles, others have an "S" curve or are steam-bent in three dimensions to place the handles in an ergonomic configuration but close to the shaft. The snaith has either one or two short handles at right angles to it, usually one near the upper end and always another roughly in the middle. The handles are usually adjustable to suit the user. A curved, steel blade between 60 and 90 centimetres (23 1/2 and 35 1/2 in) long attaches at the lower end at 90°, or less, to the snaith. Scythes almost always have the blade projecting from the left side of the snaith when in use, with the cutting edge towards the mower; left-handed scythes are made but cannot be used together with right-handed scythes as the left-handed mower would be mowing in the opposite direction and could not mow in a team. Left-handed scythes primarily exist not to suit left-handed mowers but to mow back out from an obstruction on the left, such as when mowing back from the end of a ditch; ditch mowers may have both left- and right-handed ditch-scythes with them to do this.

== Use ==
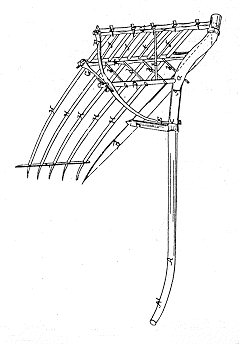
The occasional addition of a cradle aligns the seed heads and makes picking up and winnowing easier.

The use of a scythe was historically called mowing, now often scything to distinguish it from machine mowing. The mower holds the top handle in the left hand and the central one in the right, with the arms straight, the blade parallel and very close to the ground. The mower cuts along the mowing edge of the meadow, keeping the uncut grass to the right. The blade hooks the grass on the right and is swung to the left in a long arc ending to the left of the mower to form a windrow of cut grass on the previously mown ground. The mower takes a small step forward and repeats the motion, proceeding with a steady rhythm, stopping at frequent intervals to hone the blade. The correct technique has a slicing action on the grass, leaving a swathe of uniformly cut stubble, and forming a regular windrow on the left.

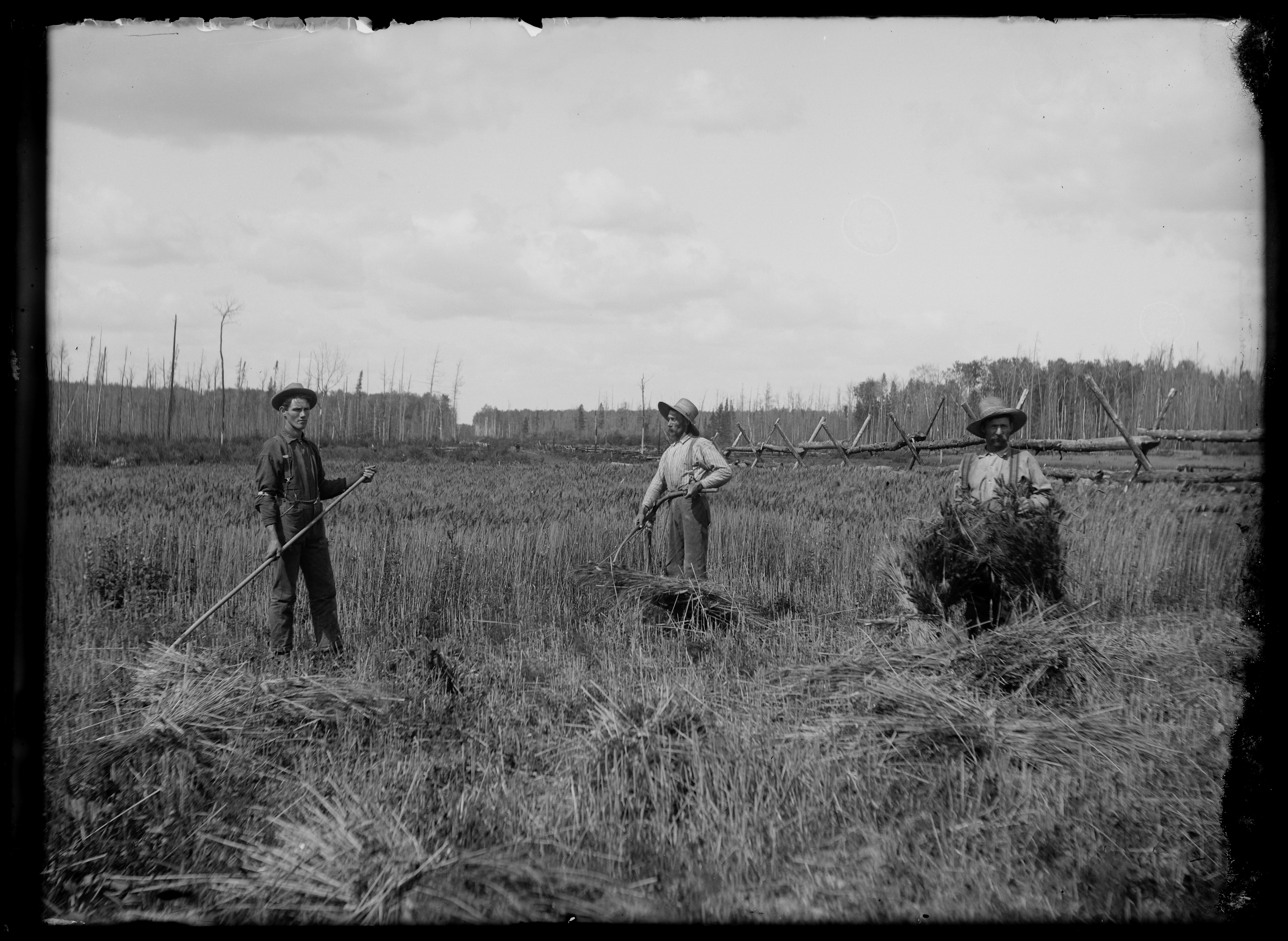
Men working in a field near Fort Frances, between 1900 and 1909

When mown in a team, the team starts at the edge of the meadow in a staggered line, then proceeds clockwise, finishing in the centre. Mowing with a scythe is a skilled task that takes time to learn fully. Long-bladed scythes, typically around 90 centimetres (35 1/2 in) and suitable for mowing grass or wheat, are harder to use at first; consequently, beginners usually start on shorter blades, generally 70 centimetres (27 1/2 in) or less. Common beginner errors include setting up the snaith with the handles in the wrong locations to suit the body, setting the blade at the wrong turn-in and turn-up angles to suit the conditions, choosing a blade that is too long for the skill level, failing to start with a sharp edge and persevering with a dull one during use, chopping or hacking at the grass, trying to cut too wide a strip of grass at once and striking the ground with the blade. Historically, beginners relied on mentors to help them set up and maintain their scythe and to teach them to mow comfortably and efficiently.

Mowing grass is easier when it is damp, and so hay-making historically began at dawn and often stopped early, the heat of the day being spent raking and carting the hay cut on previous days or peening the blades.

Scythes are designed for different tasks. A long, thin blade 90 to 100 centimetres (35 1/2 to 39 1/2 in) is most efficient for mowing grass or wheat, while a shorter, more robust scythe 60 to 70 centimetres (23 1/2 to 27 1/2 in) is more appropriate for clearing weeds, cutting reed or sedge and can be used with the blade under water for clearing ditches and waterways. Skilled mowers using long-bladed scythes honed very sharp were used to maintain short lawn grass until the invention of the lawnmower. Many cultures have used a variety of 'cradles' to catch cut different kinds of grain stems, keeping the seed heads aligned and laying them down in an orderly fashion to make them easier to sheaf and winnow.

=== Sharpening ===
The cutting edge of a scythe blade is maintained by occasional peening followed by frequent honing. Peening reforms the malleable edge by hammering, creating the desired edge profile, locally work-hardening the metal, and removing minor nicks and dents. For mowing fine grass, the bevel angle may be peened extremely fine, while for coarser work a larger angle is created to give a more robust edge. Peening requires some skill and is done using a peening hammer and special anvils or by using a peening jig. Historically, when mowing in teams, a peening station was set up on the edge of the field during harvest, but is nowadays more likely back in the workshop.

In the example below, a short scythe blade, being used to clear brambles, is being sharpened. Before being taken to the forest, the blade is peened in the workshop: this reforms the malleable steel to create an edge profile that can then be honed. Peening is done only occasionally; how often depends on the hardness of the steel and the nature of the work. The Austrian blade shown is being used to cut tough-stemmed brambles and it is being peened about every thirty hours of work. Nicks and cuts to the blade edge can usually be worked out of the blade by peening and a new edge profile formed for honing.

A peening jig is being used here, but blades can be free-peened using various designs of peening anvils. The peening jig shown has two interchangeable caps that set different angles: a coarse angle is set first about 3 mm back from the edge, and the fine angle is then set on the edge, leaving an edge that lends itself to being easily honed. The blade is then honed using progressively finer honing stones and then taken to the field. In the field, the blade is honed using a fine, ovoid whetstone (or rubber), fine-grained for grass, coarser for cereal crops. Honing is performed the moment the mower senses that the edge has gone off; this may be every half hour or more depending on the conditions. The laminated honing stone shown here has two grades of stone and is carried into the field soaking in a water-filled holster on the belt. A burr is set up on the outside of the blade by stroking the blade on the inside; the burr is then taken off by gently stroking it on the outside. There are many opinions, regional traditions and variations on exactly how to do this; some eastern European countries even set up the burr on the inside.

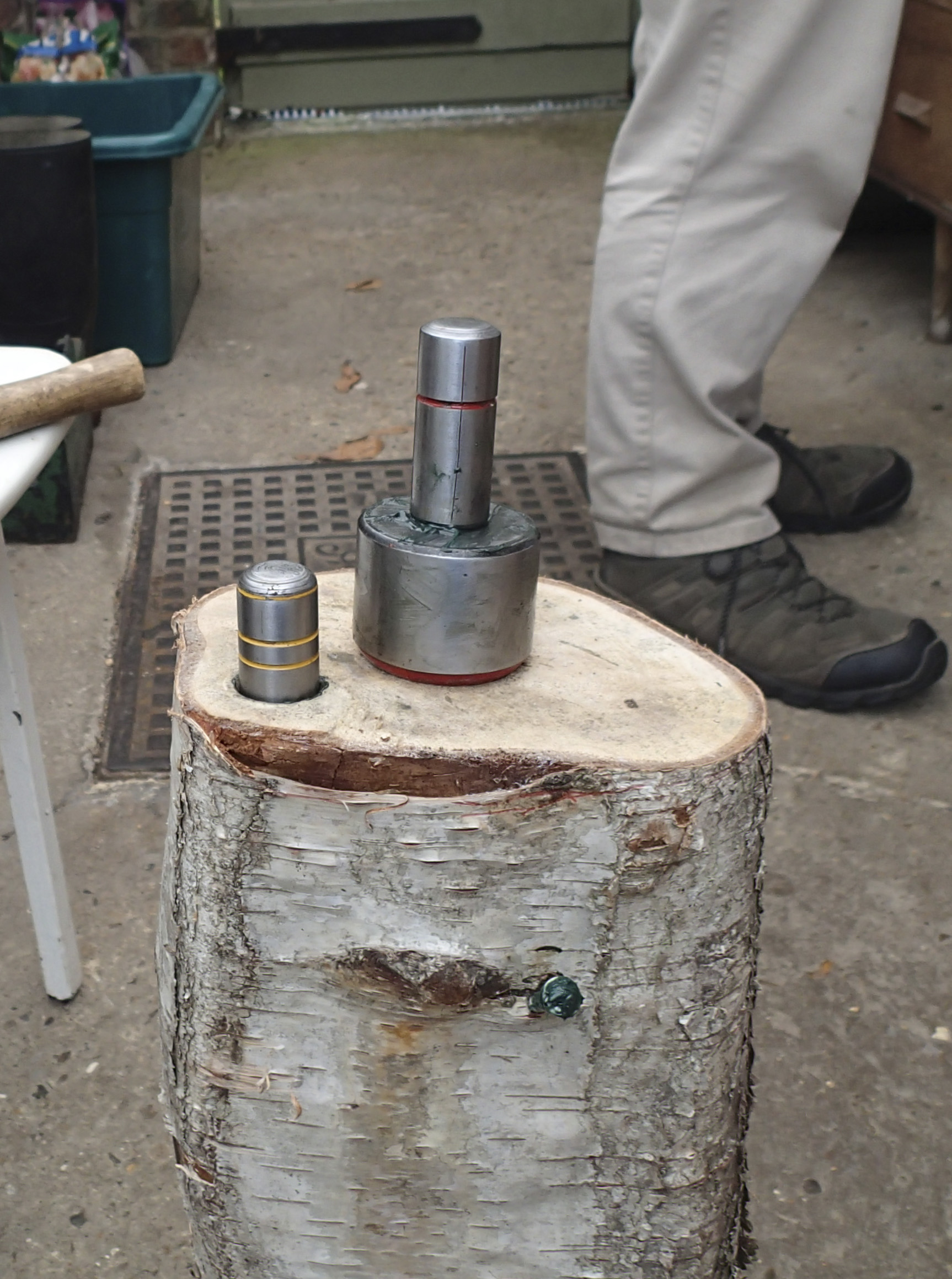
A peening jig anvil. Note the two colour-coded caps.

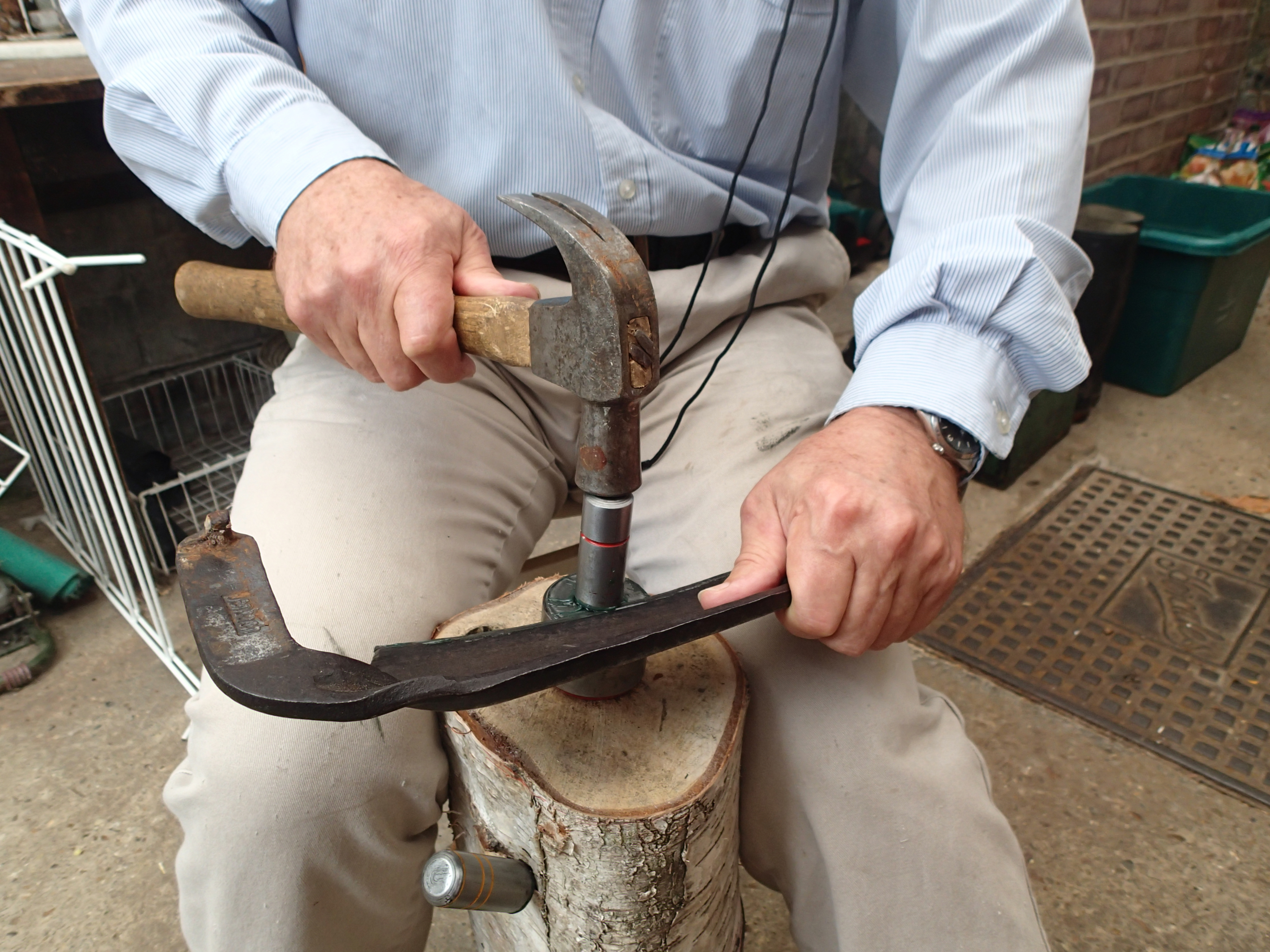
Peening a scythe blade using the jig

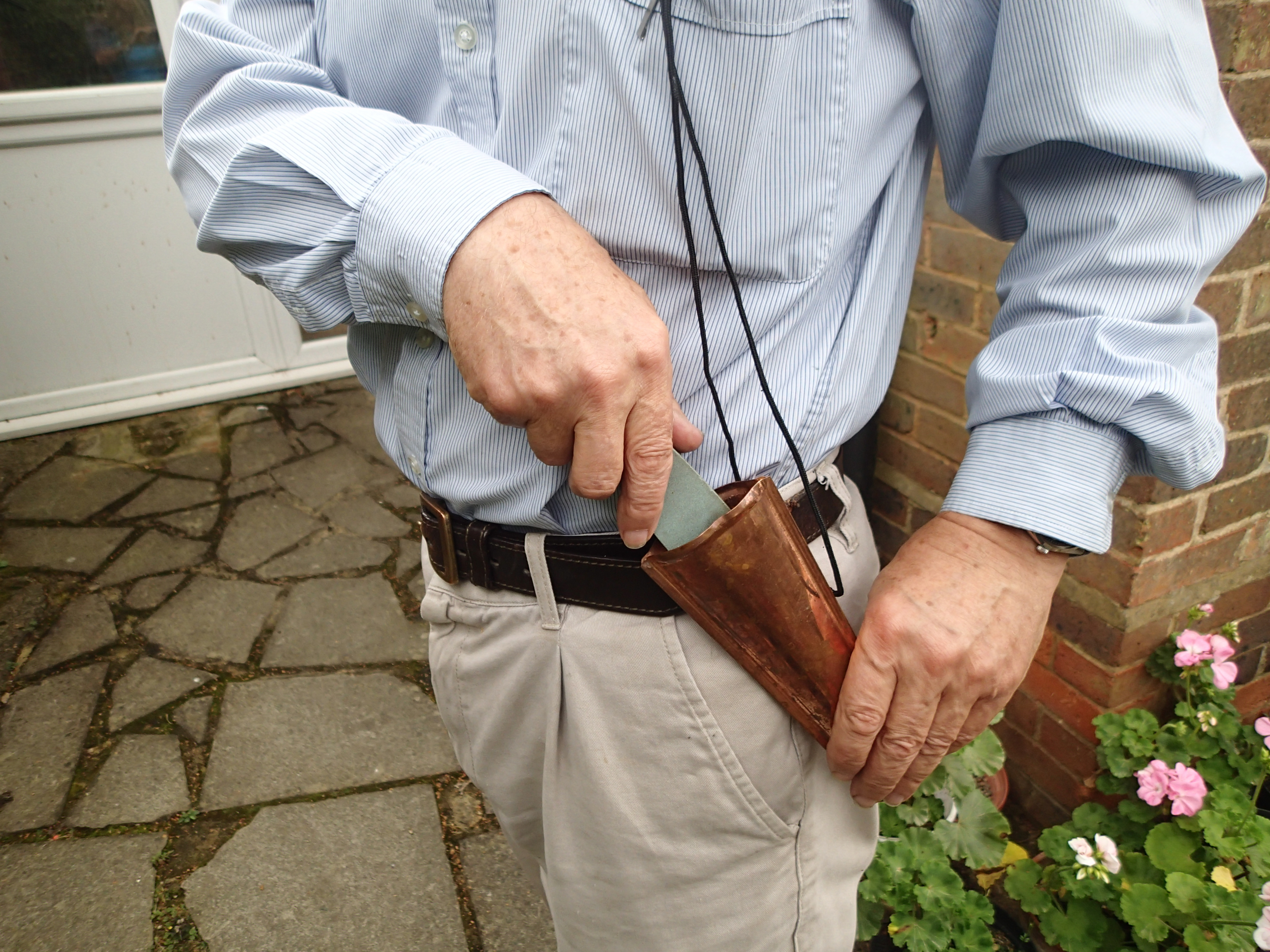
A typical ovoid honing stone soaking in a water-filled sheath

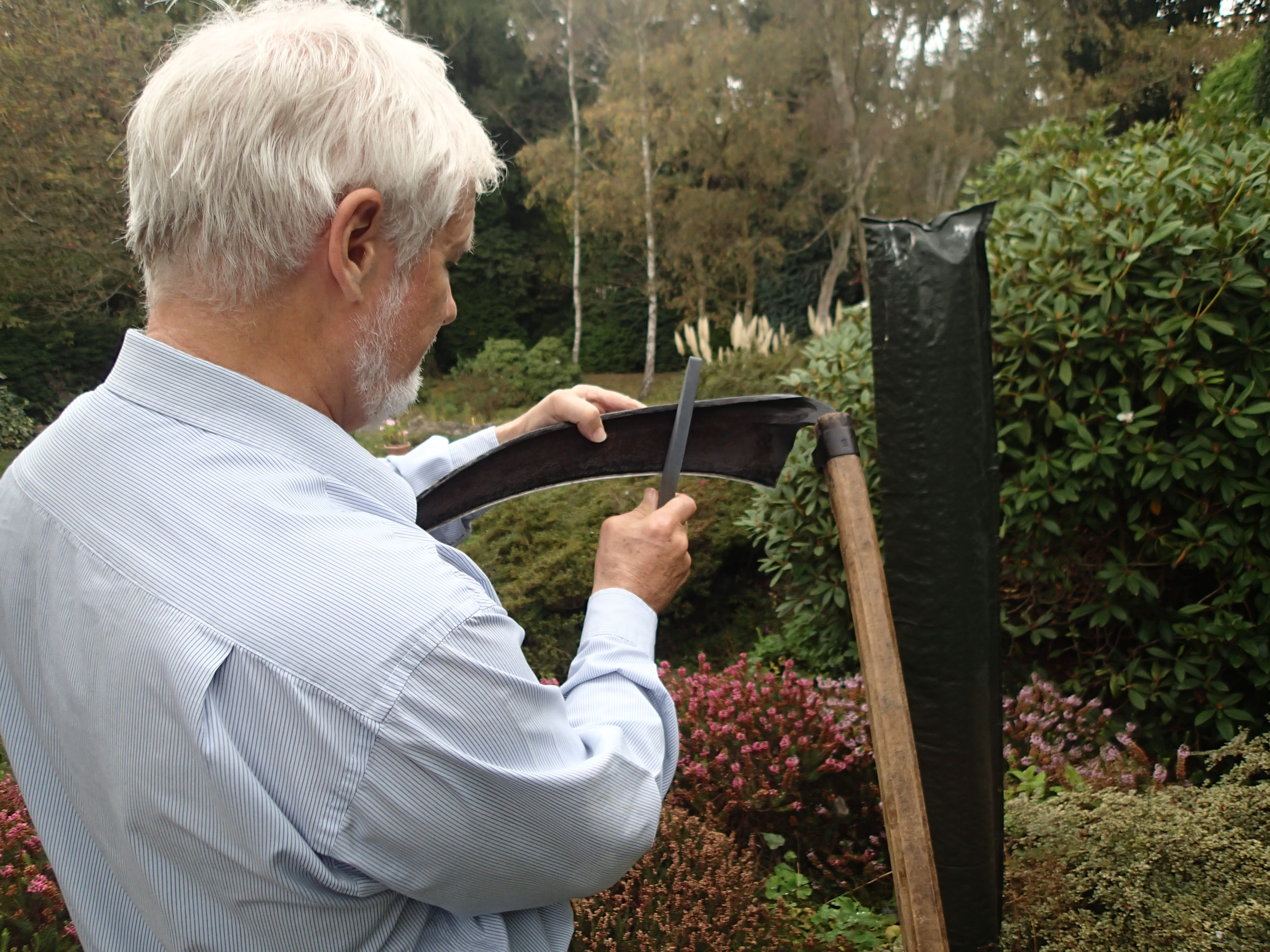
Setting up a burr on the outside of the blade by honing on the inside

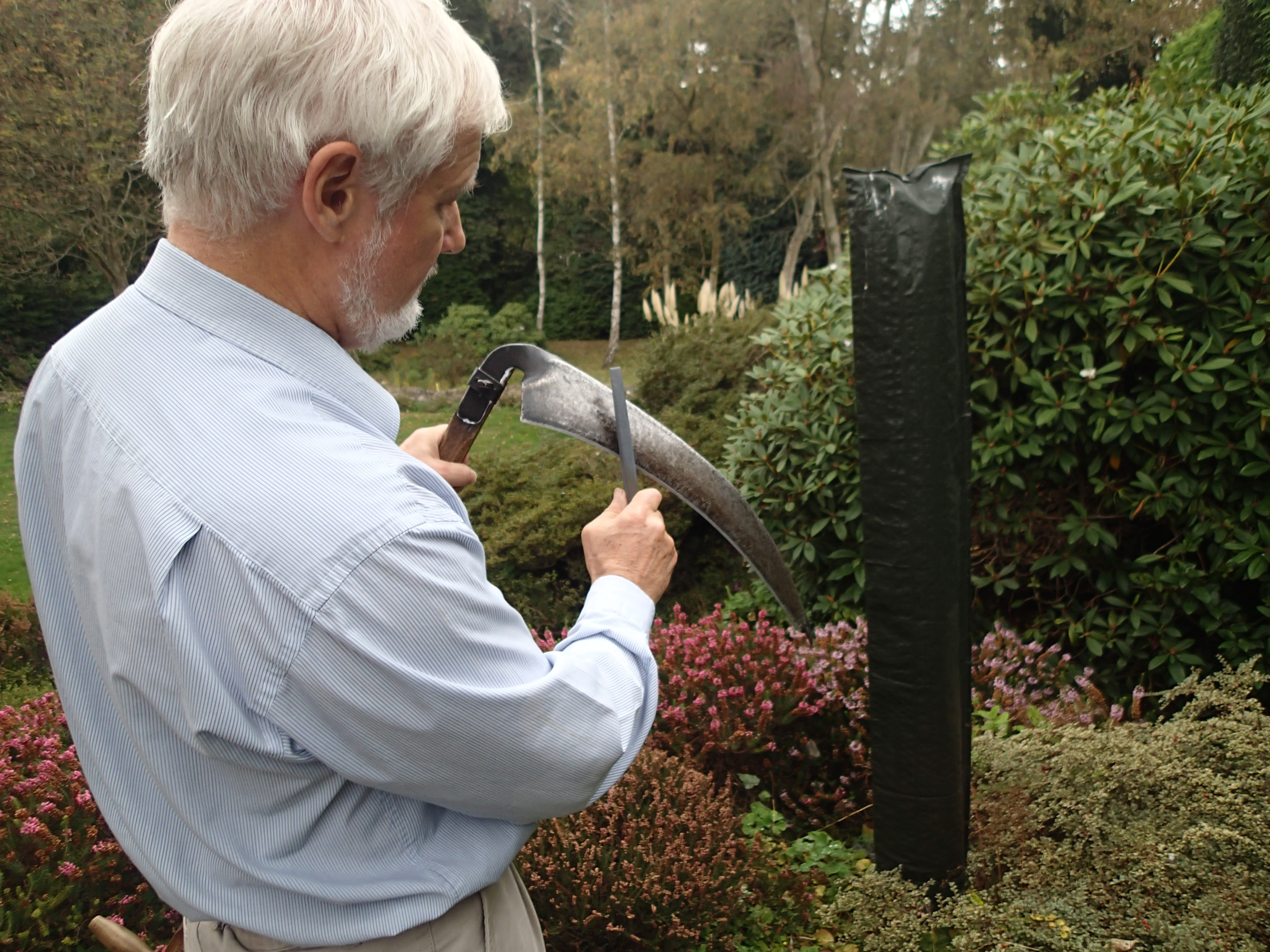
Taking the burr off the outside of the blade by honing on the outside

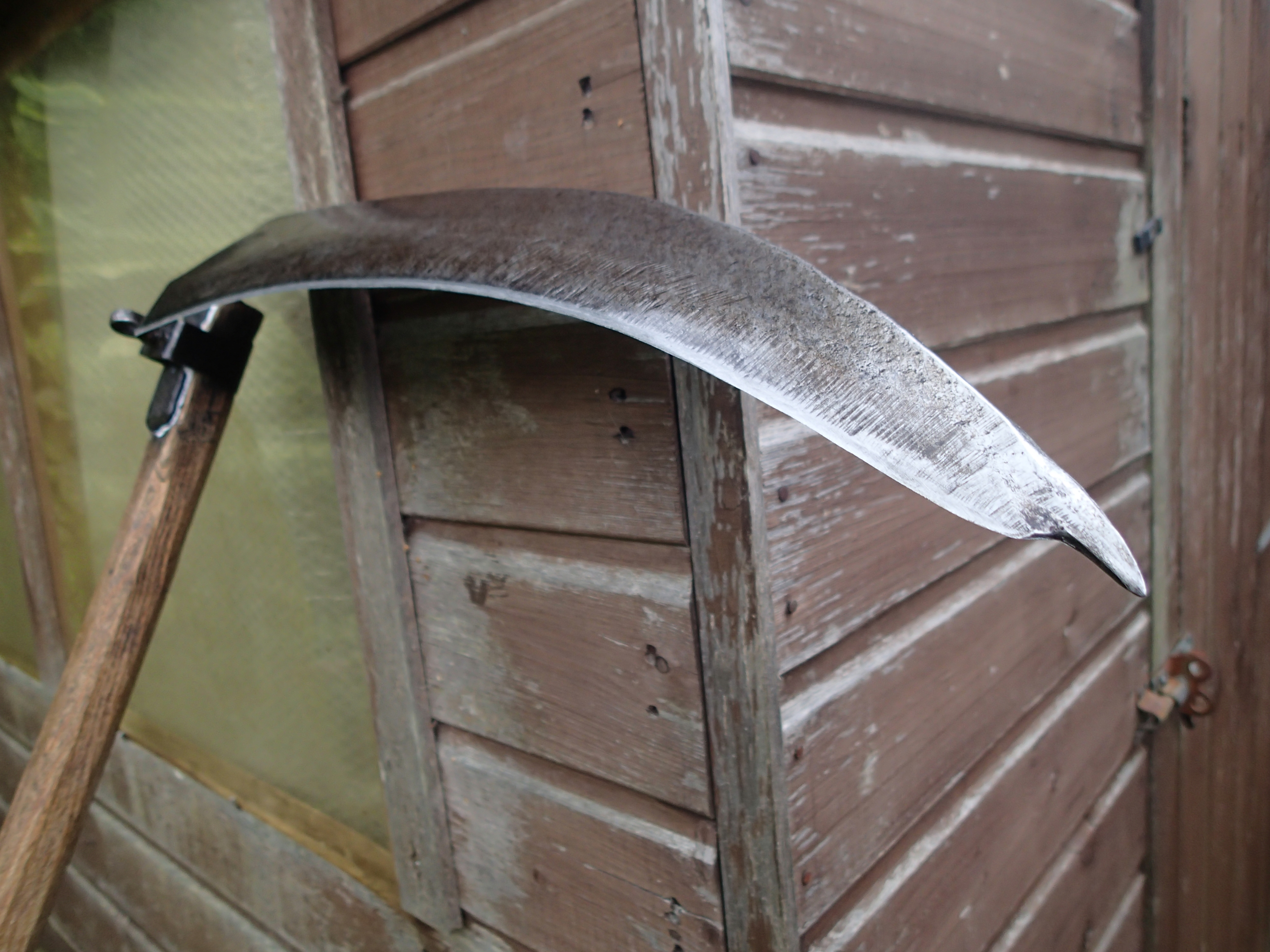
The finished blade

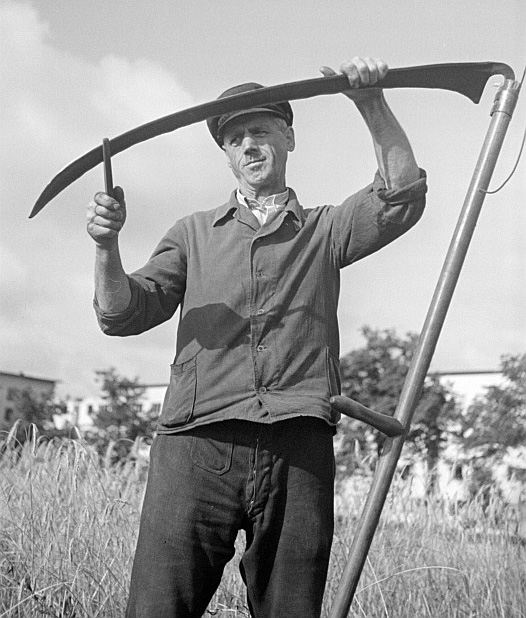
Image from a 1945 rye harvest, showing a very long blade being honed on the job. Setting up the burr.

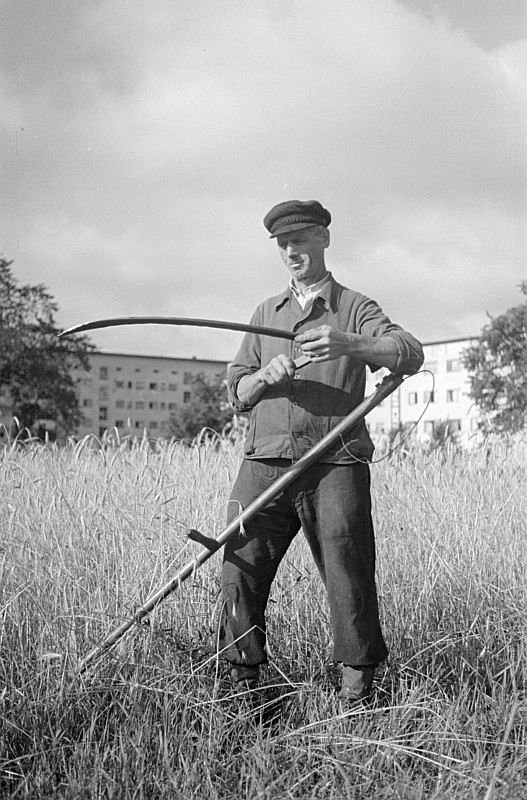
Removing the burr on the outside face, ready to mow again

Unlike European blades, which are made from malleable steel, typical American blades are made of harder, more brittle, steel and risk cracking if peened. While the harder blade holds an edge longer and requires less frequent honing in the field, the edge can only be reshaped by grinding after heavy use or damage. This usually only needs to be done only 1–3 times a season because of the greater wear resistance of the harder steel. Some examples have a laminated construction with a hard, wear-resistant core providing the edge, and softer sides providing strength. In American blades, the edge steel is typically clad on either side with the tough iron, while some Nordic laminated blades have a layer of iron on the top only, with the edge steel comprising the bottom layer.

== History ==
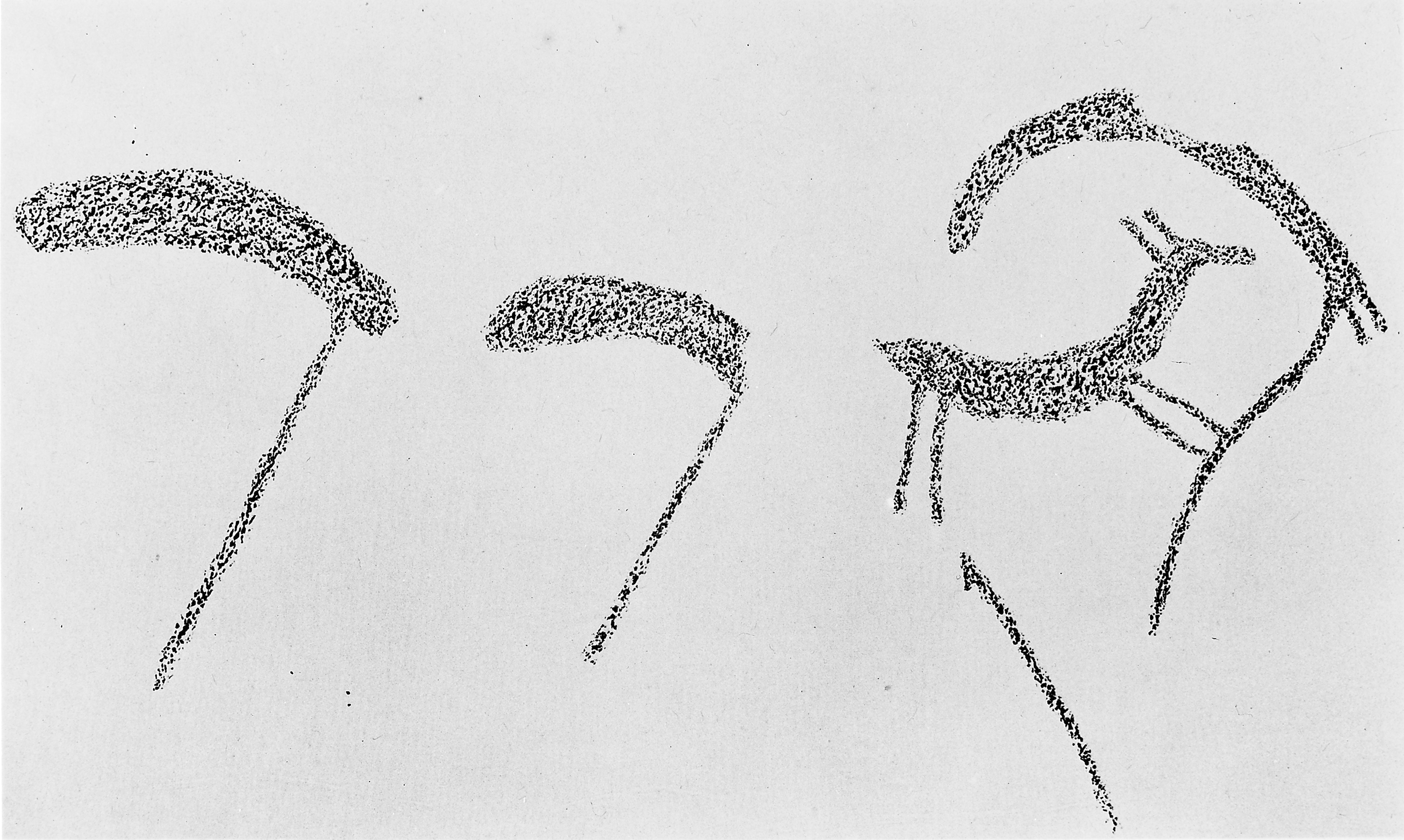
Neolithic rock engraving depicting scythes, Norway

Scythes may date back as far as c. 7000 BC; they seem to have been used since Cucuteni–Trypillia settlements, becoming widespread with agricultural developments. Initially used mostly for mowing hay, it had replaced the sickle for reaping crops by the 16th century, as the scythe was better ergonomically and consequently more efficient. In about 1800, the grain cradle was sometimes added to the standard scythe when mowing grain; the cradle was an addition of light wooden fingers above the scythe blade which kept the grain stems aligned and the heads together to make the collection and threshing easier. In the developed world, the scythe has been largely replaced by the motorised lawn mower and combine harvester. However, the scythe remained in common use for many years after the introduction of machines because a side-mounted finger-bar mower – whether horse- or tractor-drawn – could not mow in front of itself, and scythes were still needed to open up a meadow by clearing the first swathe to give the mechanical mower room to start.

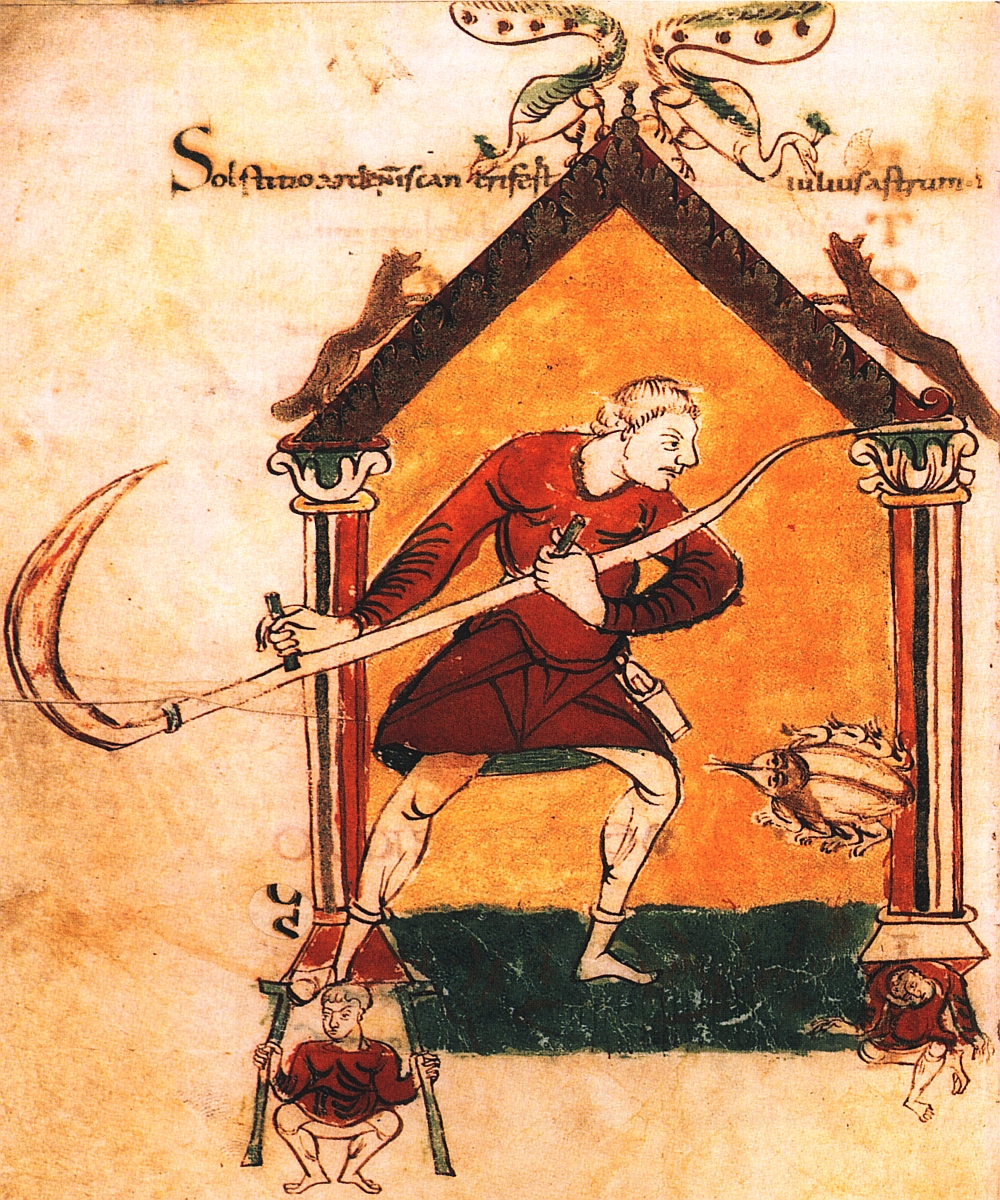
German peasant with scythe, from 850 AD

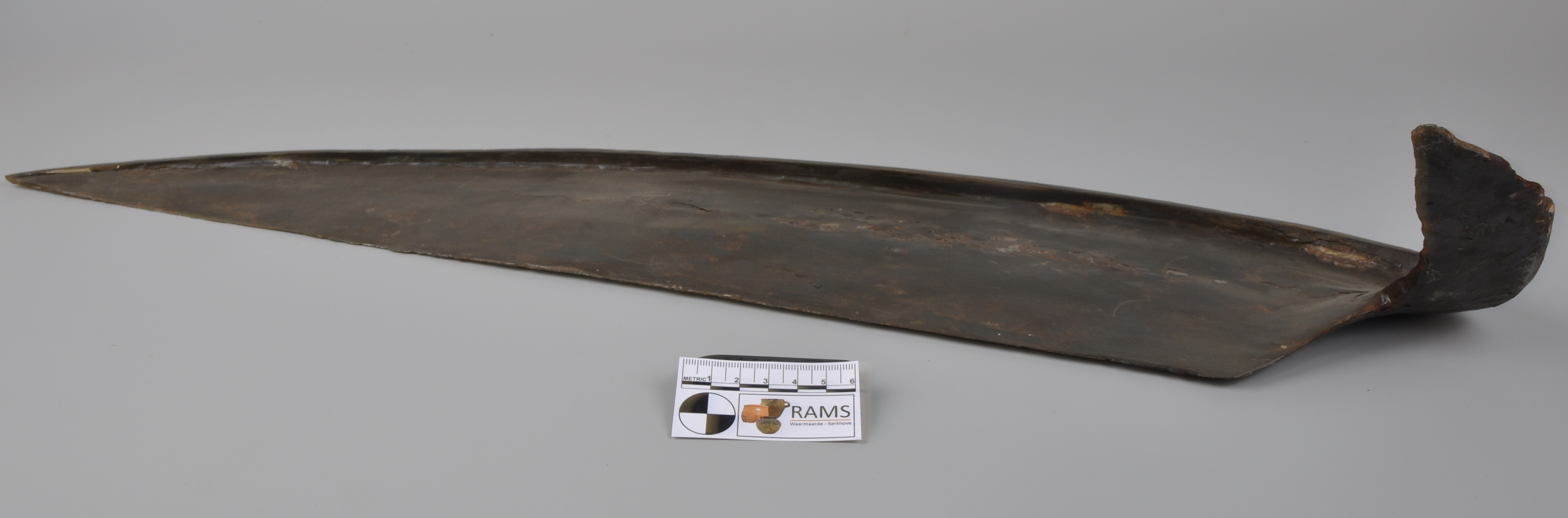
Early Medieval scythe blade from the Merovingian site Kerkhove-Kouter in Belgium (collection number: RAMS00393)

The Dictionary of Greek and Roman Antiquities of Sir William Smith argues that the scythe, known in Latin as the falx foenaria as opposed to the sickle, the falx messoria, was used by the ancient Romans. According to ancient Greek mythology, Gaia – the Greek goddess and mother of the Titans – gave a sickle made of the strongest metal to her youngest son Kronos, who is also the youngest of the Titans and god of the harvest, to seek vengeance against her husband Ouranos for torturing their eldest sons. The Grim Reaper is often depicted carrying or wielding a scythe. According to Jack Herer and Flesh of The Gods (Emboden, W. A. Jr., Praeger Press, New York, 1974), the ancient Scythians grew hemp and harvested it with a hand reaper that would be considered a scythe.

The Abbeydale Industrial Hamlet in Sheffield, England, is a museum of a scythe-making works that was in operation from the end of the 18th century until the 1930s. This was part of the former scythe-making district of north Derbyshire, which extended into Eckington. Other English scythe-making districts include that around Belbroughton.

The German Renaissance scythe sword, the Greek and Roman harpe and the Egyptian khopesh were scythes or sickles modified as weapons or symbols of authority. An improvised conversion of the agricultural scythe to a war scythe by re-attaching the blade parallel to the snaith, similar to a bill, has also been used throughout history as a weapon. See § In art below for an example.

== In national cultures ==
Although the scythe is still an indispensable tool for farmers in developing countries and in mountainous terrain, the tool has become associated with the Grim Reaper.

In Romania, for example, in the highland landscape of the Transylvanian Apuseni Mountains, scything is a very important annual activity, taking about 2–3 weeks to complete for a regular house. As scything is a tiring physical activity and is relatively difficult to learn, farmers help each other by forming teams. After each day's harvest, the farmers often celebrate by having a small feast where they dance, drink and eat, while being careful to keep in shape for the next day's hard work. In other parts of the Balkans, such as in Serbian towns, scything competitions are held where the winner takes away a small silver scythe. In small Serbian towns, scything is treasured as part of the local folklore, and the winners of friendly competitions are rewarded richly with food and drink, which they share with their competitors.

Among Basques, scythe-mowing competitions are still a popular traditional sport, called segalaritza (from Spanish verb segar: to mow). Each contender competes to cut a defined section of grown grass before his rival does the same.

There is an international scything competition held at Goričko where people from Austria, Hungary, Serbia and Romania, or as far away as Asia, enter to showcase their culturally unique method of reaping crops. In 2009, a Japanese man showcased a wooden reaping tool with a metal edge, which he used to show how rice was cut. He was impressed with the speed of the local reapers, but said such a large scythe would never work in Japan.

The old Hornindal Municipality in Norway had a coat of arms that showed three scythe blades.

In Poland, especially regions surrounding Kraków, the memory of Scythemen (Polish: Kosynierzy) of the 1794 Kościuszko Uprising is still vivid and commemorated. In order to strengthen the Polish forces against the Russians Kościuszko issued an act of mobilisation, but the difficulties with providing enough armament for the mobilised troops made Kościuszko form large units composed of peasants armed with scythes. Their motto was They Feed and Defend (Polish: Żywią i Bronią, archaic spelling: Żywią y Bronią).

The emblem of Bnei Akiva, a Jewish religious-Zionist youth movement, contains wheat, scythe and pitchfork, representing agriculture and the combination of land labor with the Torah.

In 2012, The Wall Street Journal reported some American homeowners were eschewing motorized lawn mowers in favor of scythes, citing the lack of noise as well as the health benefits of scythe reaping as exercise.

== In art ==
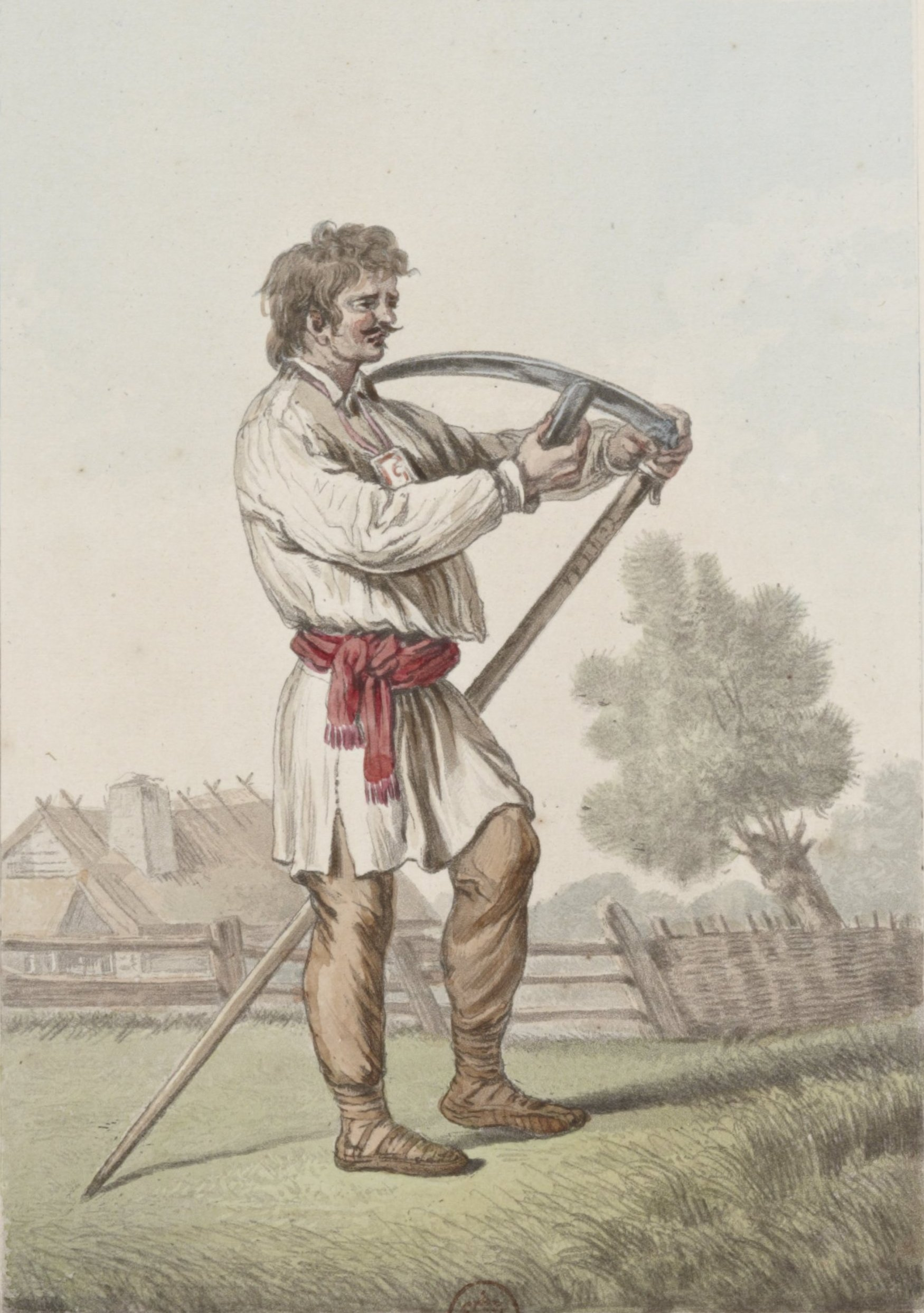
1817 illustration of a Polish peasant sharpening a scythe (drawn by Jan Piotr Norblin, engraved by Philibert-Louis Debucourt)

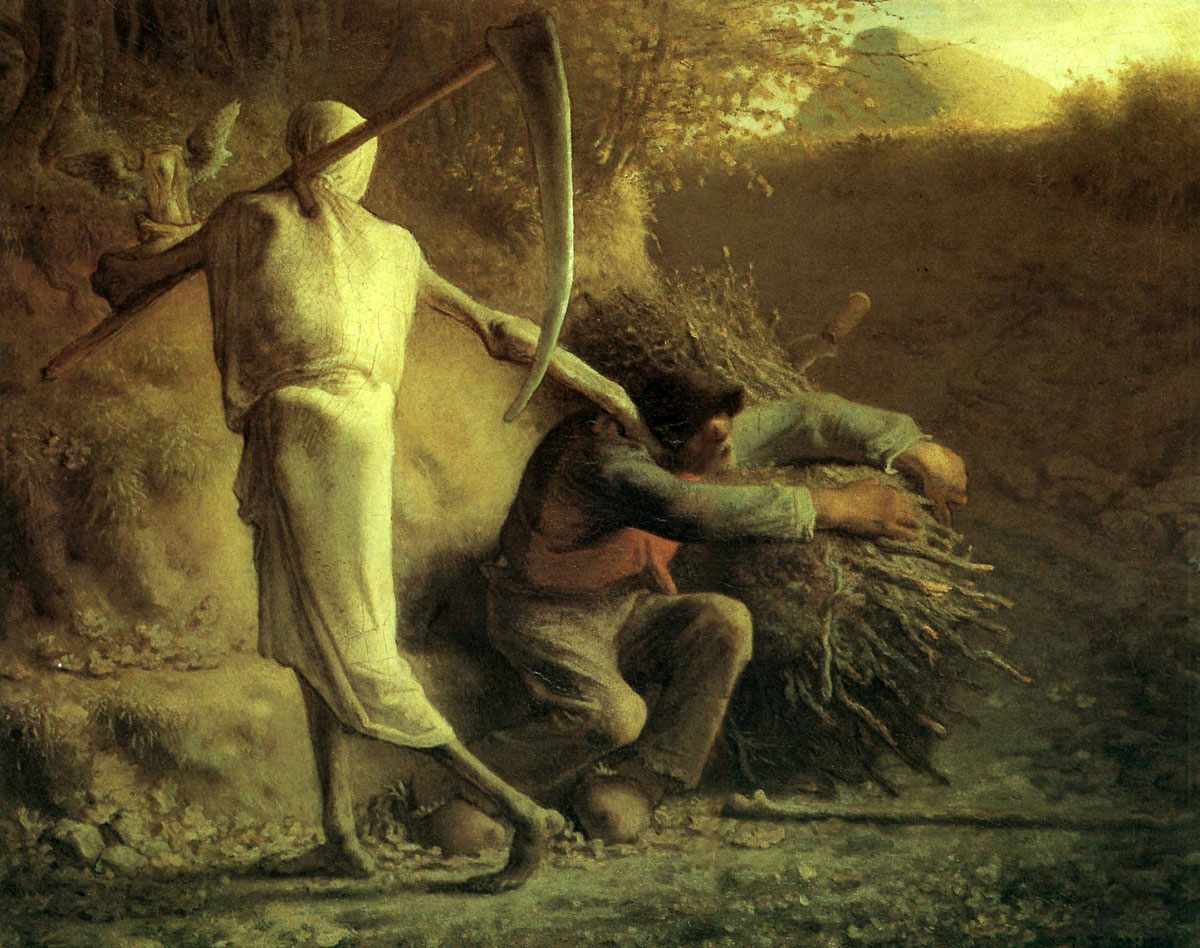
Death and the woodcutter by Jean-François Millet, 1859

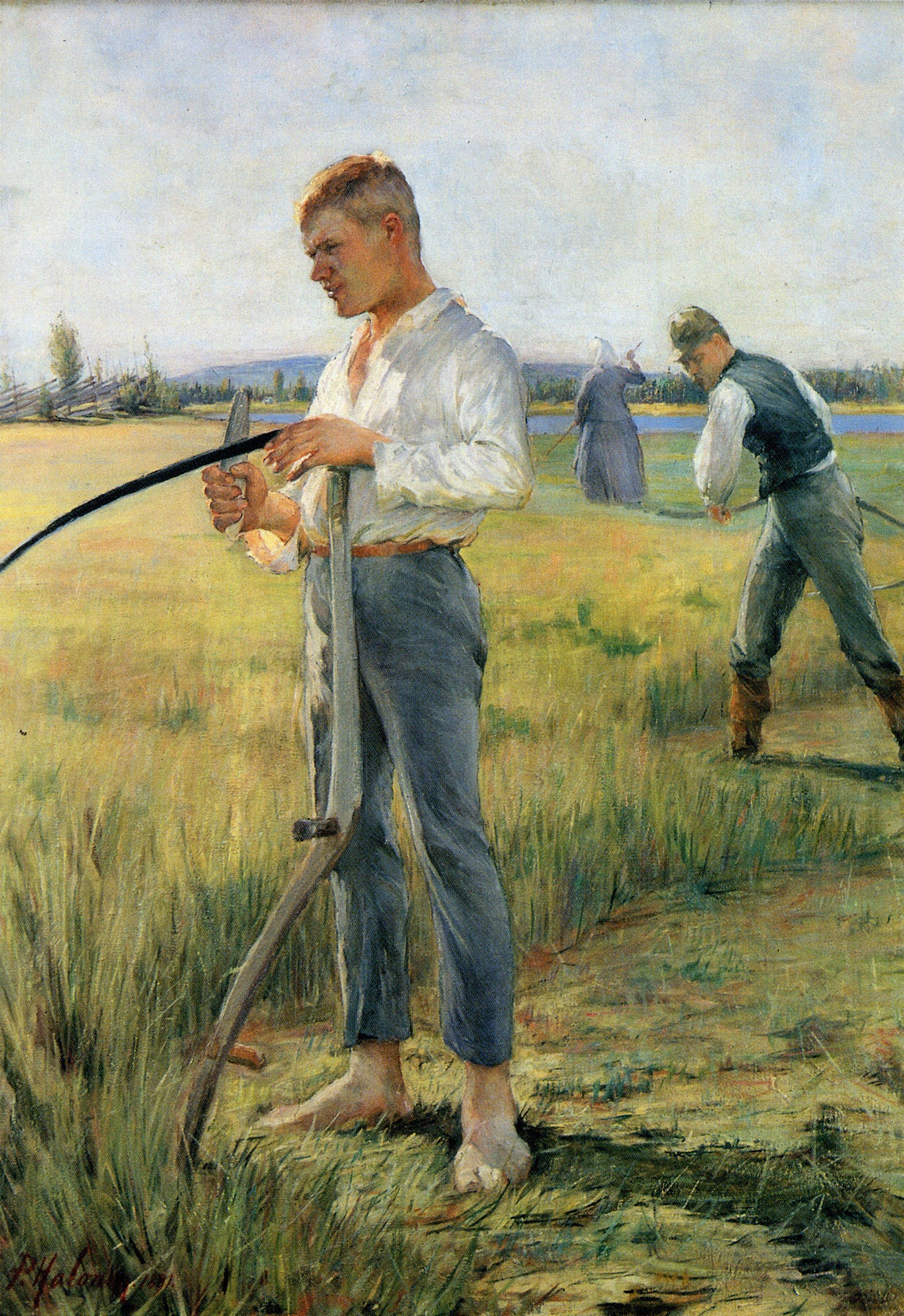
Niittomiehet (Mower men), by Pekka Halonen, 1891

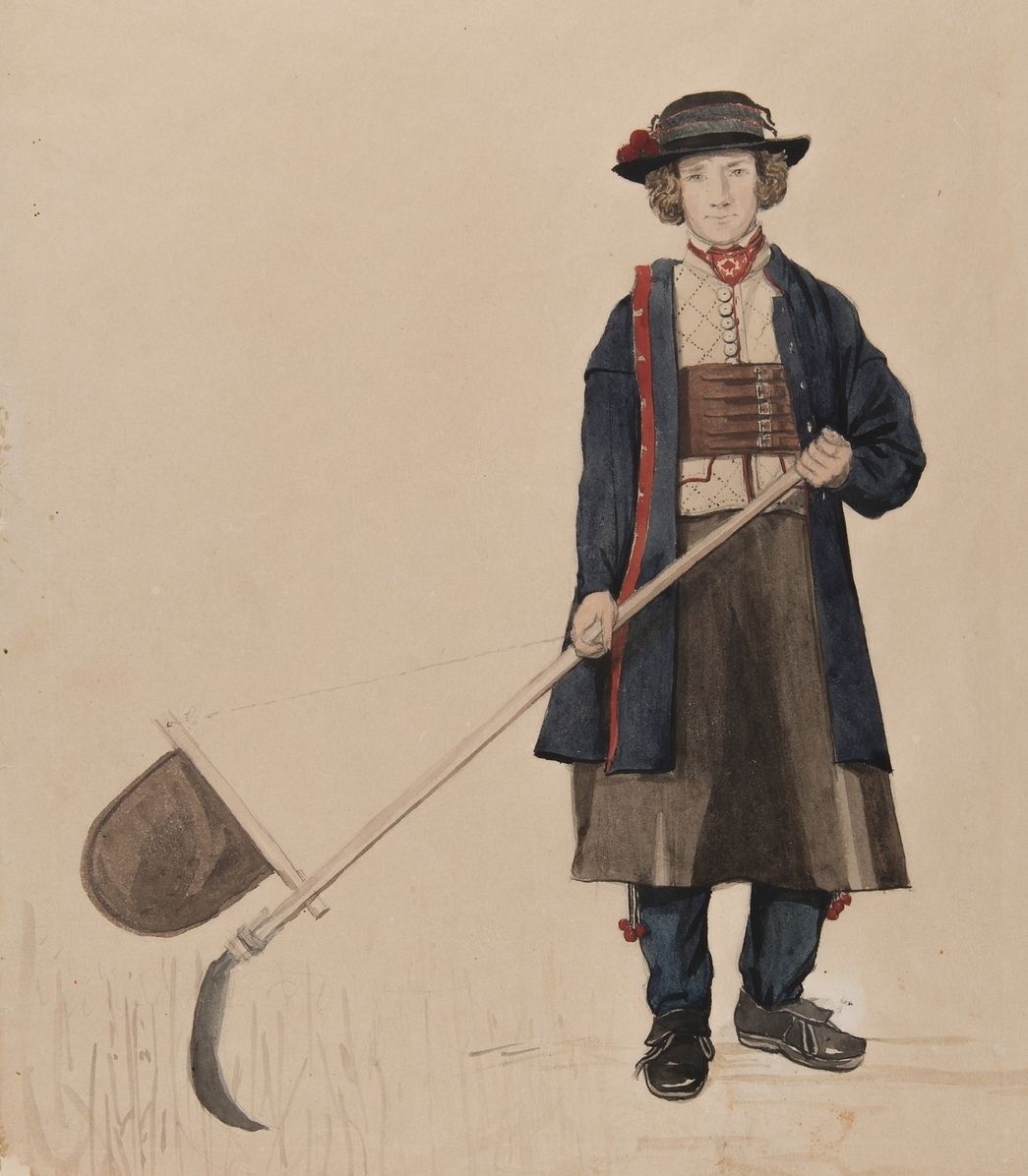
Swedish boy with scythe by Per Södermark, second part of 19th century

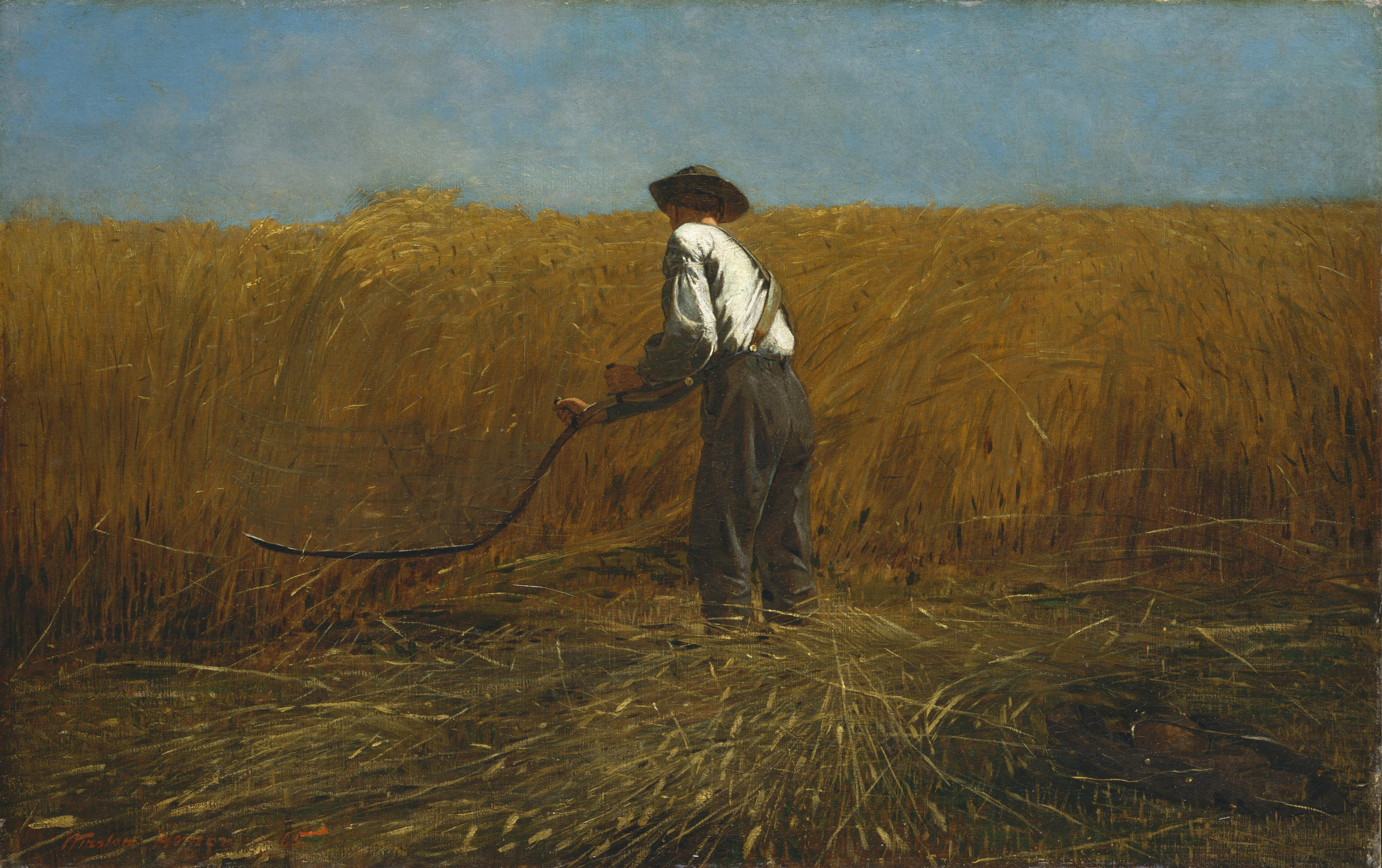
Winslow Homer, The Veteran in a New Field, 1865

A horse holding scythe in the coat of arms of Orimattila

== See also ==
- Billhook, a version of the sickle used for cutting shrubs and branches
- Death, a cultural personification depicted in some mythologies as wielding a scythe
- Grain cradle, for aligning grain stems
- Harpe, a Greek or Roman long sickle or scythe which doubled as a weapon
- Kama (tool), a Japanese hand scythe used in farming, and martial arts
- Khopesh, an Egyptian long sickle or scythe as a weapon
- Scythe sword, scythe blade converted to use as a weapon
- Sickle, the archetypal forerunner of the scythe
- Sling blade, double-edged hand tool
- String trimmer, a garden tool for cutting grass and groundcover which uses a flexible monofilament line instead of a blade
- War scythe, a polearm resembling a modified scythe
