= Andro Melos =

Japanese tokusatsu television miniseries

- Genre: Tokusatsu; Superhero; Kaiju; Science fiction Kyodai Hero
- Created by: Tsuburaya Productions
- Written by: Andro Kōbō; Kazuho Mitsuta; Masahide Fukushima; Takumi Fujimori; Naoyuki Etō
- Directed by: Yoshikazu Takahashi; Tatsurō Furuta
- Voices of: Makoto Ataka; Kenyu Horiuchi; Susumu Kotaki; Kumiko Mizukura; Shojiro Kihara; Shingo Kanemoto; Kyoko Oguma
- Opening theme: "Andro Melos" by Ichirou Mizuki, Columbia Yurikago Kai
- Ending theme: "Kaettekoi yo Andro Melos" by Ichirou Mizuki
- Composer: Shizuka Tamagawa
- Country of origin: Japan
- No. of episodes: 45

Production
- Producer: Tomohiko Hamada
- Running time: 5–10 minutes

Original release
- Network: TBS
- Release: February 28 – April 29, 1983

Related
- Ultra Series

Andro Melos (アンドロメロス, Andoro Merosu) is a Japanese tokusatsu television miniseries produced by Tsuburaya Productions, aired in TBS from February 28 to April 29, 1983 on weekdays. The miniseries was made as an adaptation to the popular Ultra Brothers Story: Andro Melos (ウルトラ兄弟物語アンドロメロス, Urutora Kyōdai Monogatari Andoro Merosu) and Ultra Super Legend: Andro Super Warriors (ウルトラ超伝説アンドロ超戦士, Urutora Chō Densetsu Andoro Chō Senshi) magazine and manga publications, hence it became the first tokusatsu in Japan to be available exclusively on home video. The show's name was inspired by one of the protagonists of 1975 Ultra Series manga The Ultraman (ザ・ウルトラマン, Za Urutoraman), Melos, but both he and the title character are entirely unrelated to each other.

== Synopsis ==
The Andros (アンドロ人, Andorojin) is a tribe similar to the Ultras from Nebula M78. In addition to their devotion for peace and justice, they established the Andro Defense Force as their answer to the Inter-Galactic Defense Force. At that moment, the Gua Army started their conquest for universal domination and sent out their Fighting Bems to wreak havoc in multiple planets. To protect the peace of the universe, Melos and the Andro Defense Force rode the Andro Boat (アンドロ艇, Andoro-tei) to fly in the vast universe.

== Characters ==
=== Andro Defense Force ===
The Andro Defense Force (アンドロ警備隊, Andoro Keibitai) is an organization formed by the Andros (a race with similar traits to the Ultra Warriors) under Zoffy's advice to maintain peace in outer space. When the Gua Army spread their influence, the team set out to fight the regime and its leaders. Each members wear Cosmo Tector (コスモテクター, Kosumo Tekutā) combat armor with distinctive colors and weapons. As revealed in Ultra Galaxy Fight, the team had recruited several new members (including Andro Ares), as Andro Melos left his position as a leader to join the Galaxy Rescue Force.

- Andro Melos: The titular protagonist in the mini-series, he is the captain of the Andro Defense Force and is known for his green colored armor. The Ultra Cross (ウルトラクロス, Urutora Kurosu) badge on his armor is an award given by Zoffy himself. In the recent media of Ultra Series, Andro Melos had since left his position to join the Galaxy Rescue Force.
  - In Andro Melos magazine, the original owner of the green Cosmo Tector was Cesar (セザル, Sezaru), who relinquished it to Zoffy to save his life at the cost of his own. Zoffy adopted the alias Andro Melos to fight against the Gua Army and eventually gave it to Caesar's son Benoit (ブノワ, Bunowa), who assumed it and the Andro Melos alias ever since then, including his appearance in the eponymous television series.
- Andro Wolf (アンドロウルフ, Andoro Urufu): A team member who wears the red-colored Cosmo Tector. He has a companion named Alien Ape "Elpa" (エープ星人 エルパ, Ēpu Seijin Erupa), who was killed by Judah of the Gua Army. In the magazine series, he was originally known as Andro Melos II (アンドロメロスII, Andoro Merosu Nisei).
- Andro Mars (アンドロマルス, Andoro Marusu): The strongest member of the team, known for his brute strength and orange Cosmo Tector.
- Andro Flor (アンドロフロル, Andoro Furoru): The only female member of the team, her Cosmo Tector is white colored and has a pair of wings. Flor came from a family of royal descendants, hence she is able to conjure the Super Barrier (スーパーバリヤー, Sūpā Bariyā) force field like her family members.

=== Gua Army ===
The Gua Army (グア軍団, Gua Gundan) is the antagonist of the series, a barbaric empire led by the unseen Combined Great Devil Emperor Gua (合身大魔帝 グア, Gasshin Daimatei Gua) and stationed on the similarly named planet. The empire's main agenda is to spread their influence through iron fist and constantly fighting against the Andro Defense Force and Ultra Warriors for standing in their way of conquest. Later in the series, it was revealed that Gua is actually the combined form of the siblings and his creation almost doomed the universe before Melos defeated him with the Grantechtor.

- Space Devils (宇宙の悪魔, Uchū no Akuma): A trio of siblings that lead the Gua Army in their conquest, namely Judah (ジュダ, Juda), Mold (モルド, Morudo), and Gina (ギナ). Following their near defeat by the Andro Defense Force, they merged into Gua in the final battle against Melos.
- Fighting Bem (ファイティング・ベム, Faitingu Bemu): The army's invasion soldiers, each were under servitude of a Space Devil sibling.
- Monster Battleships (怪獣戦艦, Kaijū Senkan): Massive combat mechas created in the image of past Ultra Monsters. The Space Devil siblings rode each one of them in a fight against the Andro Defense Force.
- Alien Magma Trio (マグマ星人三人衆, Maguma Seijin San-nin-shū): A trio of Alien Magma mercenaries based on the similarly named alien from Ultraman Leo. Led by the Re-Alien Magma (改造マグマ星人, Kaizō Maguma Seijin), they offered their services to Gua Army and has targeted multiple planets under their banner.

== Voice cast ==
- Andro Melos: Makoto Ataka (あたか 誠, Ataka Makoto)
- Andro Wolf: Kenyu Horiuchi (堀内 賢雄, Horiuchi Ken'yū)
- Andro Mars: Susumu Kotaki (小滝 進, Kotaki Susumu)
- Andro Flor: Kumiko Mizukura (水倉 久美子, Mizukura Kumiko)
- Alien Ape "Elpa", Edoras (エドラス, Edorasu): Shigeru Chiba (千葉 繁, Chiba Shigeru)
- Judah: Shojiro Kihara (木原 正二郎, Kihara Shōjirō)
- Mold: Shingo Kanemoto (兼本 新吾, Kanemoto Shingo)
- Gina: Kyoko Oguma (小熊 恭子, Oguma Kyōko)
- Dakumiran (ダクミラン): Hiroshi Ikaida (伊海田 弘, Ikaida Hiroshi)
- Bazelia (バゼリア, Bazeria): Yoshiaki Nemoto (根本 好章, Nemoto Yoshiaki)
- Narrator: Takashi Tsuda (津田 喬, Tsuda Takashi)

== Songs ==
Opening theme

- "Andro Melos" (アンドロメロス, Andoro Merosu)
  - Lyrics: Noboru Tani (谷 のぼる, Tani Noboru)
  - Composition: Shunsuke Kikuchi (菊池 俊輔, Kikuchi Shunsuke)
  - Arrangement: Kōji Yoshimura (吉村 浩二, Yoshimura Kōji)
  - Artist: Ichirou Mizuki (水木 一郎, Mizuki Ichirō), Columbia Yurikago Kai (コロムビアゆりかご会, Koromubia Yurikago Kai)

Ending theme

- "Kaettekoi yo Andro Melos" (帰って来いよアンドロメロス, Kaettekoi yo Andoro Merosu; "Come Back, Andro Melos")
  - Lyrics: Noboru Tani
  - Composition: Shunsuke Kikuchi
  - Arrangement: Kōji Yoshimura
  - Artist: Ichirou Mizuki

== Appearance in other media ==
- Ultraman Story (1984): Judah was featured in this movie as the adversary of Father of Ultra and created Grand King to fight against Ultra Brothers. The appearance of Judah was to promote the Andro Melos media as both series and related magazines.
- Ultraman X (2015): The Space Devil siblings appear as the antagonist of episodes 13 and 14 during the series' crossover with Ultraman Ginga S.
- SSSS.Gridman (2018): Andro Melos appear alongside Hunter Knight Tsurugi and Techtor Gear Zero in a cover for in-universe Uchusen magazine.
- Ultraman Taiga (2019): Episodes 13 to 15 of the Voice Drama features original characters Andro Ares and Imbeeza in Taiga's recollection in his past. The two characters pay tribute to the Andro Melos miniseries.
- Ultra Galaxy Fight: The Absolute Conspiracy (2020): Andro Melos returned to live action media for the first time since the end of his titular series. Having left the Andro Defense Force to join the Galaxy Rescue Force, he would eventually become part of Zero's Ultra League team to curb Tartarus' nefarious plot.
