= The Cradle =

The Cradle may refer to:

== Arts and entertainment ==
- The Cradle (album), a 2010 album by Colour Revolt
- The Cradle, a 2023 album by Ducktails
- The Cradle (film), a 1922 American silent drama film
- The Cradle (Morisot), an 1862 painting by Berthe Morisot

== Places and structures ==
- The Cradle (Galveston, Texas), birthplace of the Daughters of the Republic of Texas
- The Cradle (Washington), a mountain in the US state of Washington
- The Cradle Hospital Calicut, Kerala, India

== See also ==
- Cradle (disambiguation)
