= NHK Tokyo Children's Choir =

NHK Tokyo Children's Choir (NHK東京児童合唱団, NHK Tōkyō Jidō Gasshō-Dan), or NHK Tokyo Children's Chorus, is the children's choir attached to the Tokyo Broadcasting Station (JOAK) of the NHK - Japan Broadcasting Corporation radio-TV network. Since 1943 NHK had used the Otowa Yurikago Kai, established in 1933, to be its children's choir, but since 1952 has organized its own.

Through its broadcasting and recording activities, it has played an important role in popularizing Japanese and overseas children's songs in Japan. It also toured extensively throughout the world and has won important awards, such as in BBC World Amateur Chorus Competition (No. 2 in the children's area), the Centennial of Zoltán Kodály's Birth Competition (No. 1 in the children's area), EBU World Chorus Competition (No. 1 in the children's area), etc.

== See also ==
- Children's choir
- Otowa Yurikago Kai
- Beijing Angelic Choir
- Vienna Boys' Choir
