= Addy Rasidi =

Singaporean guitarist

Addy Cradle Rasidi, born in 1975, is a popular Singaporean guitarist.

== Background ==
ADDY began playing the guitar at the age of 10, and recorded his first album with the Singapore band Teacher's Pet (Warner Music) at 16, then Cradle (EMI) two years later. With the release of his first solo album, Rahsia, in 2003, he won the APM award for Best New Solo Artiste in 2004. In 2006, ADDY received the Compass Awards for Best Top Local Malay Pop Song (Mengapa Berdusta), for composer and lyricist.

ADDY revived his band, Cradle, in early 2007. They recorded an album, CERITERA AWAN, and it was released in September 2007. One of the songs, CERITERA AWAN, was chosen to be compiled in SINGAPORE MIDEM 2008 CD. AYU from the album CERITERA AWAN won Best Song Of The Year 2008 at the Anugerah Planet Muzik Awards and CERITERA AWAN won Best Album Of The Year 2008 at the Anugerah Planet Muzik Awards

2008, ADDY recorded and released his first Guitar Instrumental Album DIVINE.

ADDY, born and bred in Singapore, is the first artiste to be endorsed by IBANEZ and DiMarzio in Singapore. He is also endorsed by SWEE LEE Music Company.

ADDY is known as Addy Cradle and Addy Rasidi. ADDY is a guitarist, singer, songwriter, composer, producer, sessionist and teacher. ADDY has his own recording studio called [EDENINC] where he does most of his work.

== Career ==
In 2003, his album Rahsia was released on the MusicZone label.

His third album Transcendence - Legend Of Ryu Wuri was released in 2017. The album came with a booklet which was an Asian folklore inspired. fantasy story. IT brought attention to him as a science fiction writer.

== Other artists and session work ==
He provided guitar on most of the tracks for Shirlyn Tan's album, Newfound Jealousy. He also was the arranger on some of the tracks.

== Further info ==
http://www.dimarzio.com/#/players/ &

https://web.archive.org/web/20080518021358/http://www.ibanez.co.jp/artist/ibanez_artist_list.php?CATEGORY_ID=1 &

https://web.archive.org/web/20091218082741/http://www.sweelee.com.sg/Artist_Addy2.htm

http://www.myspace.com/addycradle

http://www.myspace.com/cradle7
