= Cradle (Malay band) =

Cradle is a popular Malay rock band from Singapore that was formed in 1995 by four well-known musicians in the music industry at that time. The group was well known on both sides of Singapore and Malaysia for being the Malay equivalent of American grunge bands back when grunge music was popular.

They received critical praise for their debut album Gurindam Keluli when it was released in 1996 under EMI Records.

This Cradle lineup no longer exists. They disbanded in 1998. The new lineup of CRADLE" (Singapore) from 2007 for "CRADLE" is MAN TOYAK on vocals, ADDY CRADLE on lead guitar and vocals, FAZLI on drums and FAIZAL on bass. "CRADLE" released their album Ceritera Awan in September 2007. One of the songs, "AYU", won Best Song Of The Year 2008 at the Anugerah Planet Muzik Awards and "Ceritera Awan" won Best Album Of The Year 2008 at the Anugerah Planet Muzik Awards.

== Members ==
=== 1995 to 1998 ===
- Rudy Boy on Lead vocals
- Addy Rasidi on guitars and vocals
- Ayin Ismael on Bass guitar
- Bobo Hashim on drums

=== 2007 onwards ===
- Man Toyak on Lead vocals
- Addy Rasidi on guitars and vocals
- Fazli on drums
- Faizal on Bass
