= Grain cradle =

Type of scythe

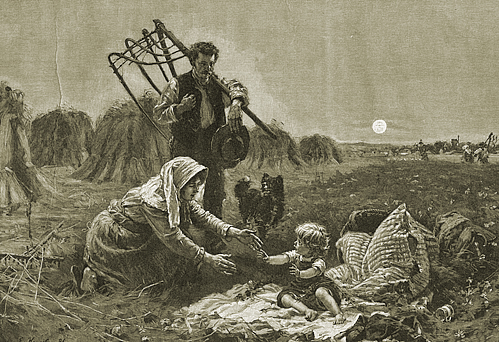
German cradle scythe from a painting by Ernst Henseler (1852–1940)

A grain cradle or cradle, is a modification to a standard scythe to keep the cut grain stems aligned. The cradle scythe has an additional arrangement of fingers attached to the snaith (snath or snathe) to catch the cut grain so that it can be cleanly laid down in a row with the grain heads aligned for collection and efficient threshing.

== History ==
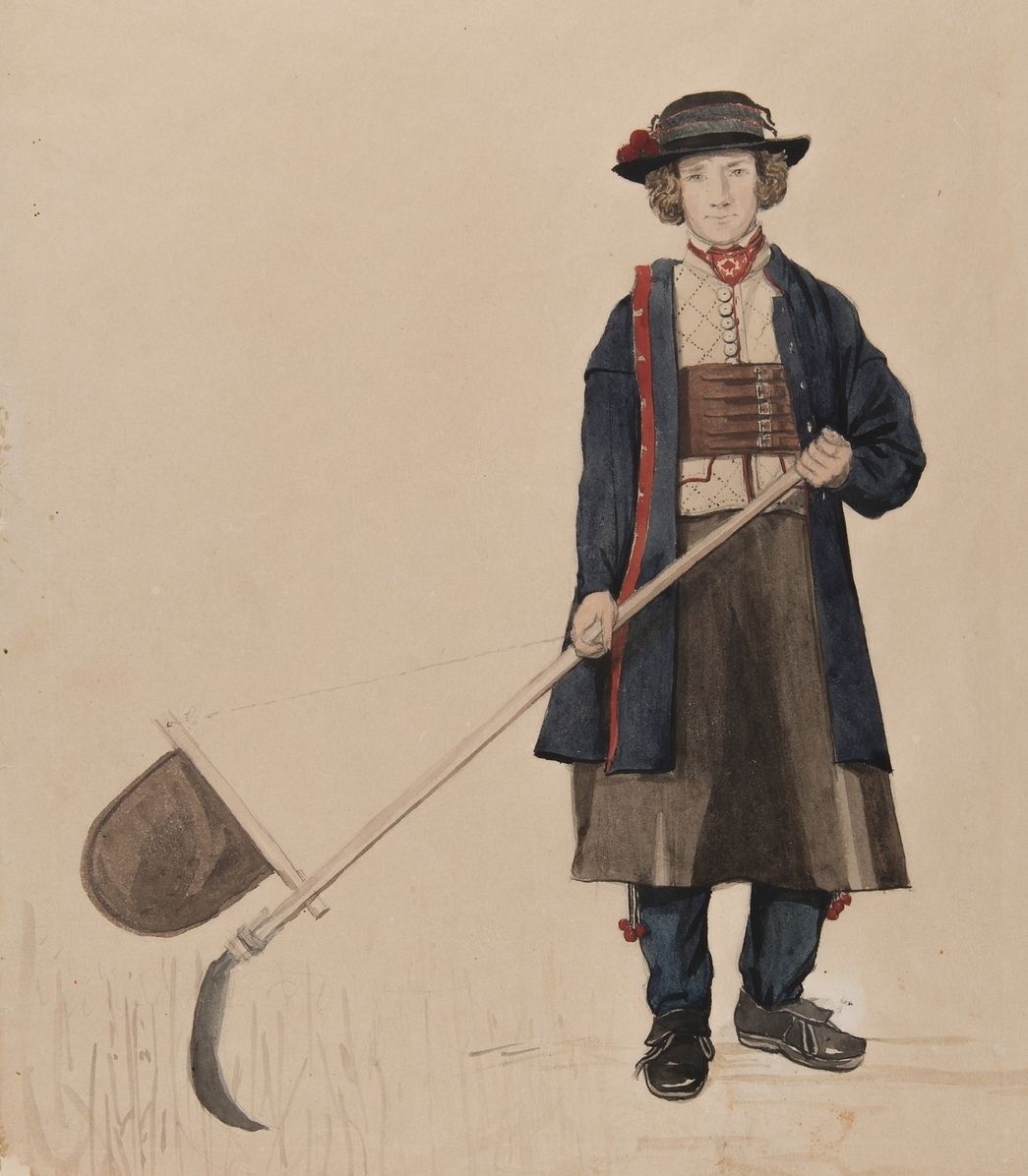
An early Swedish scythe from a painting by Per Södermark

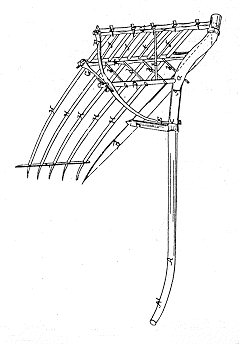
American cradle (patent drawing)

As the cultivation of grain developed, the seasonal harvest became a major agricultural event. Grain could be pulled or, later, cut with a sickle and tied into sheaves to be threshed. The scythe improved on the sickle by giving the mower a more ergonomic stance and permitting a larger blade. However, keeping the grain stems aligned in the windrow required great skill and where these skills were less available the addition of a cradle helped to manage the grain heads, reducing the sheaver's work-load and improving efficiency at threshing. Lesser skilled mowers could harvest significantly more grain by using the cradle. Although the grain cradle was in previous use in parts of Europe it was not generally used because skilled labour was traditionally available. Between 1800 and 1840 the cradle was widely adopted in the expanding grain growing area of Midwestern United States, undergoing some refinement there and resulting in the American-pattern cradle. Fifty American patents were issued between 1823 and 1930, the first in 1823 in western New York state and the last in 1924 in West Virginia peaking between 1875 and 1900. Hay does not require aligning and the scythe is more efficient without a cradle, so it was removed for haymaking.

== Decline ==
The cradle was commonly used throughout the 1800s and into the beginning of the 20th century, in part because many of the smaller farms were not designed for mechanical reaping and in part because there were still a great number of smaller farms where the mechanical reaper was not economical. However, by the end of the 19th century the cradle had been generally replaced by the mechanical reaper, a horse-drawn (or tractor-drawn) machine patented by Cyrus McCormick in 1834, and later by other mechanical methods of harvesting such as the combine harvester.
