= Olof Johan Södermark =

Swedish military officer, painter, graphic artist and sculptor

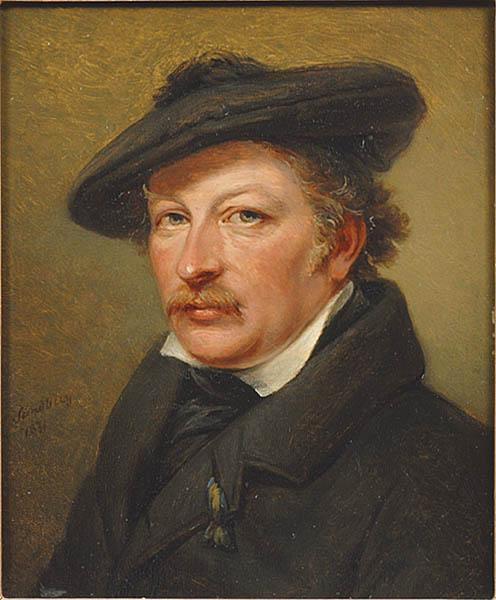
Olof Johan Södermark; portrait by Johan Gustaf Sandberg (1831)

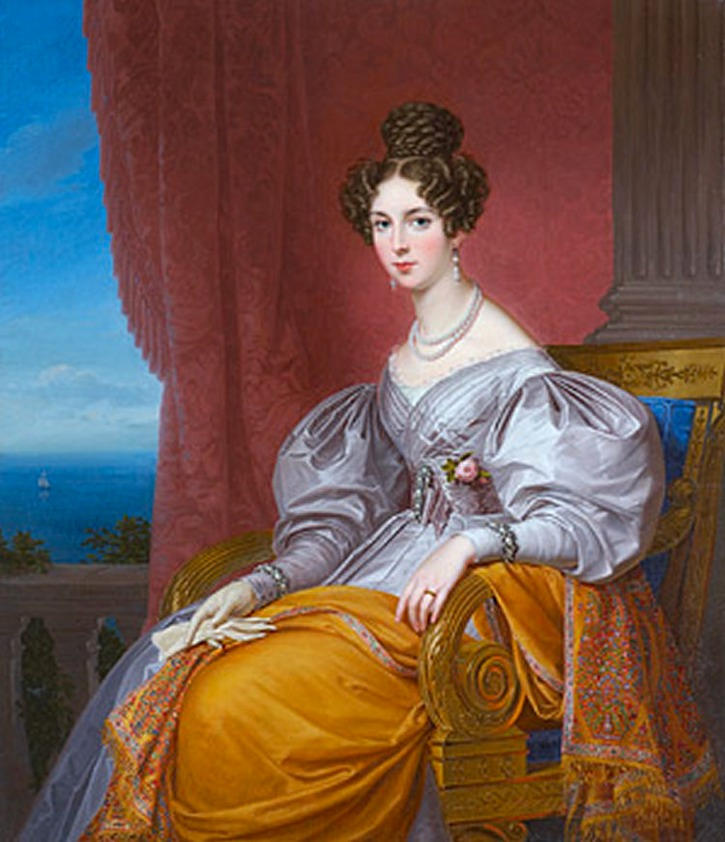
Josephine of Leuchtenberg

Olof Johan Södermark (11 March 1790 – 15 October 1848) was a Swedish military officer, painter, graphic artist and sculptor. His son, Per Södermark, was also a well-known painter and lithographer.

== Biography ==
He was born in Landskrona. In 1808, he became an Underlöjtnant with the Field Measurement Corps, and was primarily involved in cartography. Later, he became an Adjutant to Lieutenant General Sixten David Sparre. In 1813, he accompanied the Swedish Army to Germany, where he was involved in the battles of Grossbeeren and Leipzig. He was later transferred to Norway and was wounded twice. He received a medal for bravery and became a Major in 1816. After a long period of service with Count Carl Carlsson Mörner, he was commissioned to study the site for the proposed Karlsborg Fortress, draft plans, and participate in its construction.

From 1820 to 1824, he did some of his first independent, paid work; making etchings of monuments, which were published in the literary journal, Iduna. He then left Sweden, with the intention of becoming an artist. Initially, he visited Paris, where he copied works in the museums, then went to Rome, where he lived with the sculptor, Johan Niclas Byström, who had invited him there. Under his guidance, and that of Bengt Erland Fogelberg, he studied sculpture, but eventually decided to switch to portrait painting. He remained in Rome until 1828.

He had been participating in exhibitions at the Royal Swedish Academy of Fine Arts since early in his military career, but his formal debut came at the exhibition of 1829. That same year, he became a teacher of topography at the Military Academy Karlberg. In 1832 and 1833, he painted portraits of members of the Royal Family. After that, he resigned from the Topographical Corps to devote all his time to painting.

Thanks to a travel scholarship, he was able to spend much of the 1830s travelling; to Paris, Rome, Munich and London. He painted portraits of notable people at every stop. In 1841, he made his final trip, after which he lived in Stockholm until his death in 1848.

His famous sitters included King Charles XIV John of Sweden, Jöns Jacob Berzelius, Jenny Lind, Stendhal and Josephine of Leuchtenberg.
