= Cradle of Liberty =

Cradle of Liberty may refer to:

- Cradle of Liberty Council
- Faneuil Hall
