= Slip catching cradle =

Piece of cricket equipment

A slip catching cradle is a device used by cricketers to practice taking catches.

It consists of long, thin ash lathes over a bowed metal frame and is commonly used at most cricket clubs. It was invented by the Reverend Gilbert Harrison Bartlett.
