= Beijing Angelic Choir =

Children's choir based in Beijing, China

The Beijing Angelic Choir (Chinese: 北京天使合唱团) is a children's choir based in Beijing, China. It has toured extensively internationally.

It gained wider exposure when it won a National Association of Independent Record Distributors Award in the U.S. in 1995.

Two tracks from the album Beautiful Dreamer, and two from the album Praying, were included in the soundtrack of the 2007 film Dark Matter, about a Chinese research student at an American university.

== Discography ==
=== Original Albums ===
- Chinese Lullabies (1995) – TCD-5013
- Lullabies from around the World (1995) – TCD-5014
- The Jasmine Flower (1996) – TCD-5015
- Wings of Songs (1996) – TCD-5016
- Alamuhan: Chinese Folk Songs (1997) – TCD-5017
- Beautiful Dreamer (1997) – TCD-5018
- Playing in the Rain: Chinese Folk Songs (1998) – TCD-5020
- Childhood (2000) – TCD-5021
- Praying (2001) – TCD-5023
- My Happy Paradise (2002) – TCD-5025
- Days of Youth: Folksongs of Taiwan's Campus of the 70s (2003) – TCD-5026
- Good Old Days (2004) – TCD-5027

=== Compilation Album ===
- Oriental Angel Sound (29/11/2004) – SAM-0243

This is a two-disc compilation of 21 tracks selected from nine of the twelve original albums.

== See also ==
- Choir
- Vienna Boys' Choir
- NHK Tokyo Children's Choir
