= Per Södermark =

Swedish painter (1822–1889)

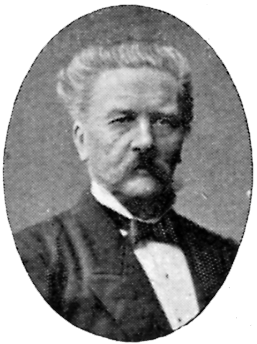
Per Södermark; from the Svenskt Porträttgalleri

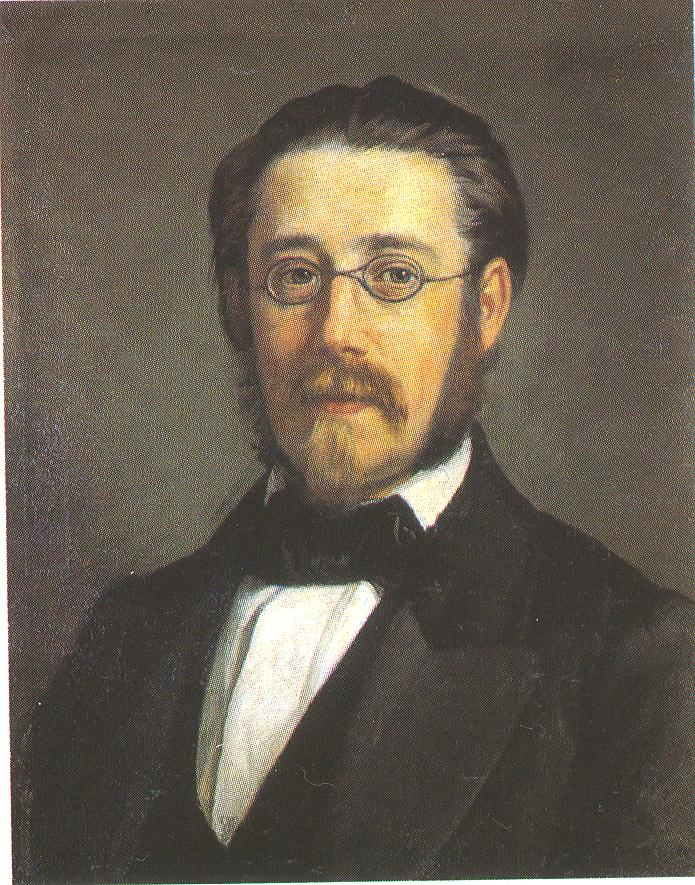
Bedřich Smetana (1858)

Johan Per Södermark (5 June 1822, Mossebro, Karlsborg Municipality - 16 November 1889, Stockholm) was a Swedish military officer, painter and lithographer.

== Biography ==
His father, Olof Johan Södermark, was a military topographer and aspiring artist. He initially followed in his father's footsteps and became an Underlöjtnant in 1843. His active service was relatively short, however, as he resigned in 1848. His education in art began with his father, then continued at the Royal Swedish Academy of Fine Arts, where he became an agré (a type of member candidate), the year of his resignation. Prior to that, he took several study trips to France and Italy.

Another factor that prompted his resignation was the death of his father; whose studio he took over. At first, he supported himself by making copies of his father's paintings, but soon began to create his own portraits. From 1852 to 1854, he made some additional study trips, to Düsseldorf, and studied with Thomas Couture in Paris from 1855 to 1856. Although he never achieved his father's realistic clarity, he was accepted in society as a sort of replacement. Unlike his father, he also painted landscapes and genre scenes.

In addition to paintings, he also created lithographs, primarily with Italian motifs. Later, in 1868, he donated the originals to the newly expanded Nationalmuseum.

He participated in numerous exhibitions of the Academy and a major showing at Copenhagen's Charlottenborg Palace in 1851. From 1872 to 1888, he participated in several Nordic Art exhibitions, also in Copenhagen. He became a full member of the Swedish Academy in 1874.

Among his most familiar sitters, outside Sweden, were the artists, Nils Blommér, and Fritz von Dardel, who also began as a military officer, and the Czech composer Bedřich Smetana. A major retrospective of his works was held in Stockholm in 1891, together with works by Gustaf Wilhelm Palm, Carl Gustaf Hellqvist and Karl Samuel Flodman. In additional to the Nationalmuseum, his works may be seen at the Academy's art gallery, Waldemarsudde and the Nordic Museum.
