= Straw =

Agricultural byproduct of cereal crops

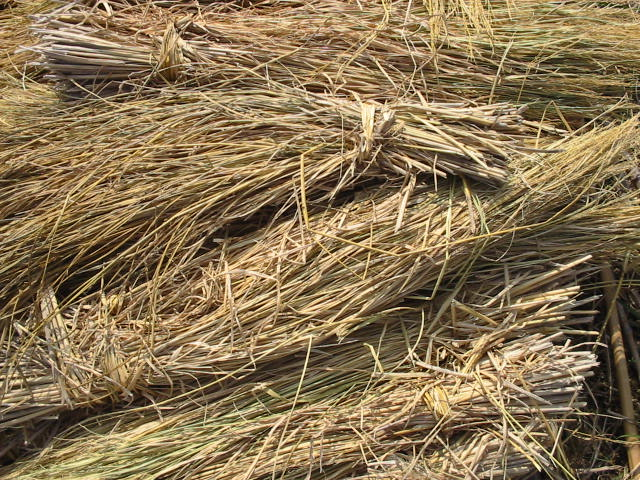
Bundles of rice straw

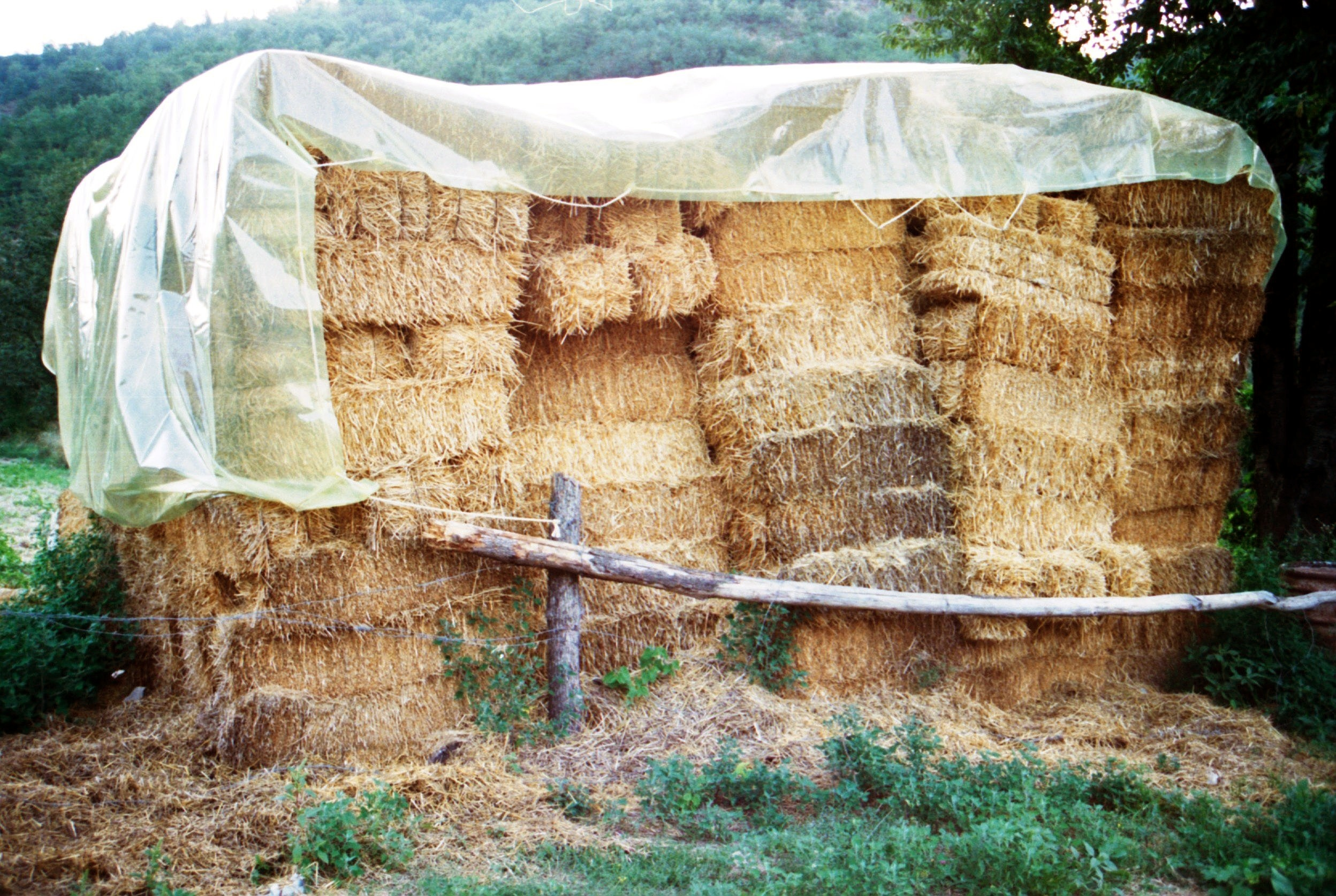
Pile of stacked small rectangular straw bales sheltered under a clear tarpaulin

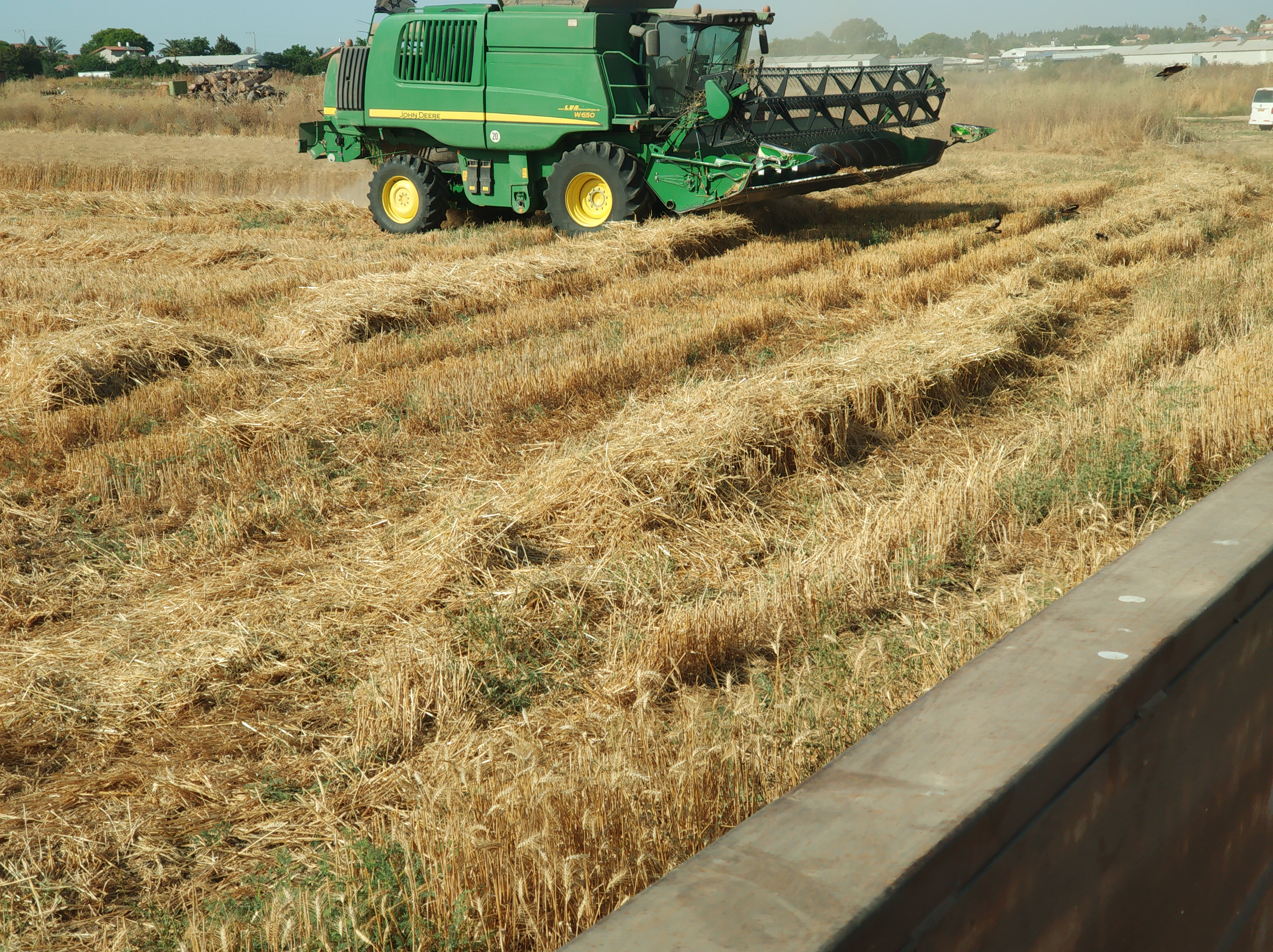
Straw lines and a combine harvester

Straw is an agricultural byproduct consisting of the dry stalks of cereal plants after the grain and chaff have been removed. It makes up about half of the yield by weight of cereal crops such as barley, oats, rice, rye and wheat. It has a number of different uses, including fuel, livestock bedding and fodder, thatching and basket making.

Straw is usually gathered and stored in a straw bale, which is a bale, or bundle, of straw tightly bound with twine, wire, or string. Straw bales may be square, rectangular, star shaped or round, and can be very large, depending on the type of baler used.

Straw is a type of lignocellulosic biomass. In other words, it is largely made out of the structural biopolymers cellulose (~30%), hemicellulose (~25%), and lignin (~10%).

== Uses ==
Current and historic uses of straw include:

=== Animal feed ===
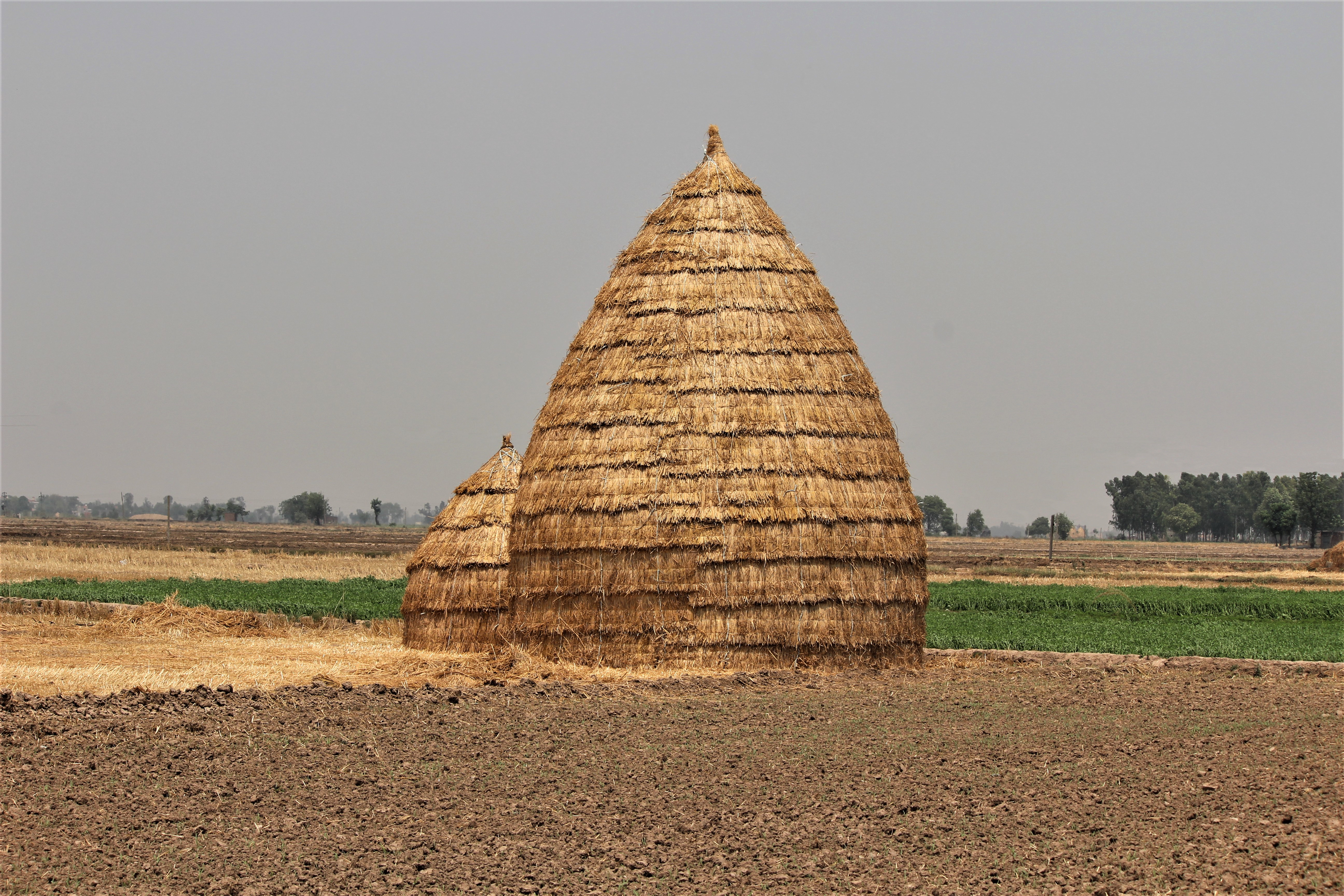
A traditional method of storing wheat hay in Punjab

Straw may be fed as part of the roughage component of the diet to cattle or horses that are on a near maintenance level of energy requirement. It has a low digestible energy and nutrient content (as opposed to hay, which is much more nutritious). The heat generated when microorganisms in an herbivore's gut digest straw can be useful in maintaining body temperature in cold climates. Due to the risk of impaction and its poor nutrient profile, it should always be restricted to part of the diet. It may be fed as it is, or chopped into short lengths, known as chaff.

=== Structural material ===
==== Bedding ====
Straw is commonly used as bedding for ruminants and horses. It may be used as bedding and food for small animals, but this often leads to injuries to mouth, nose and eyes as straw is quite sharp.

The straw-filled mattress, also known as a palliasse, is still used by people in many parts of the world.

==== Construction material ====
In many parts of the world, straw is used to bind clay and concrete. A mixture of clay and straw, known as cob, can be used as a building material. There are many recipes for making cob.

When baled, straw has moderate insulation characteristics (about R-1.5/inch according to Oak Ridge National Lab and Forest Product Lab testing). It can be used, alone or in a post-and-beam construction, to build straw bale houses. When bales are used to build or insulate buildings, the straw bales are commonly finished with earthen plaster. The plastered walls provide some thermal mass, compressive and ductile structural strength, and acceptable fire resistance as well as thermal resistance (insulation), somewhat in excess of North American building code. Straw is an abundant agricultural waste product, and requires little energy to bale and transport for construction. For these reasons, straw bale construction is gaining popularity as part of passive solar and other renewable energy projects.

Wheat straw can be used as a fibrous filler combined with polymers to produce composite lumber.

Enviroboard can be made from straw.

Strawblocks are strawbales that have been recompressed to the density of woodblocks, for compact cargo container shipment, or for straw-bale construction of load-bearing walls that support roof-loads, such as a "living" or green roofs.

==== Crafts ====
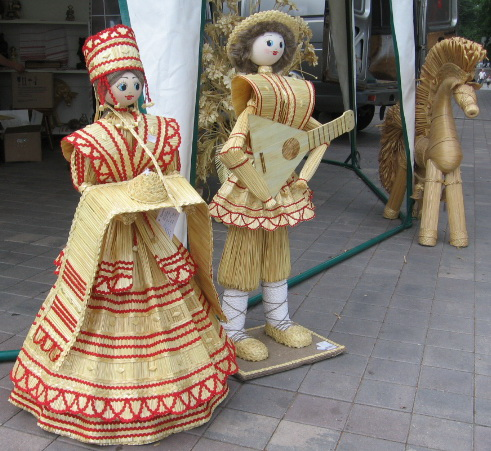
Belarusian straw dolls

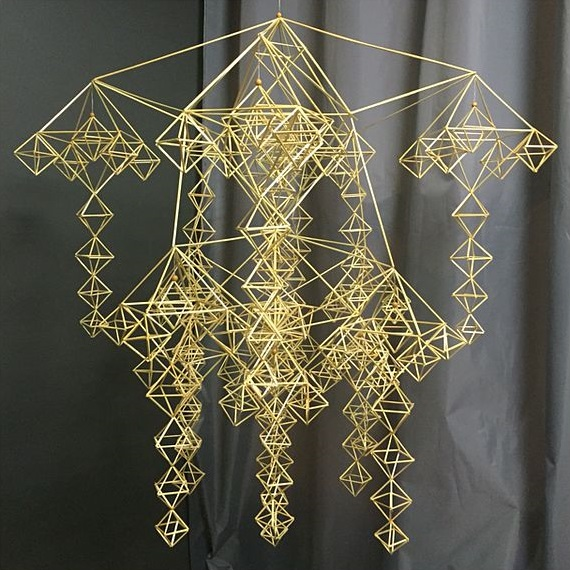
Latvian traditional Ziemassvētki straw art mobile puzuris

Craft usages of straw include:

- Corn dollies
- Straw marquetry
- Straw mobile (straw art)
- Straw painting
- Straw plaiting
- Scarecrows
- Japanese Traditional Cat's House

===== Basketry =====
Bee skeps and linen baskets are made from coiled and bound together continuous lengths of straw. The technique is known as lip work.

- Japanese wara art

===== Hats =====
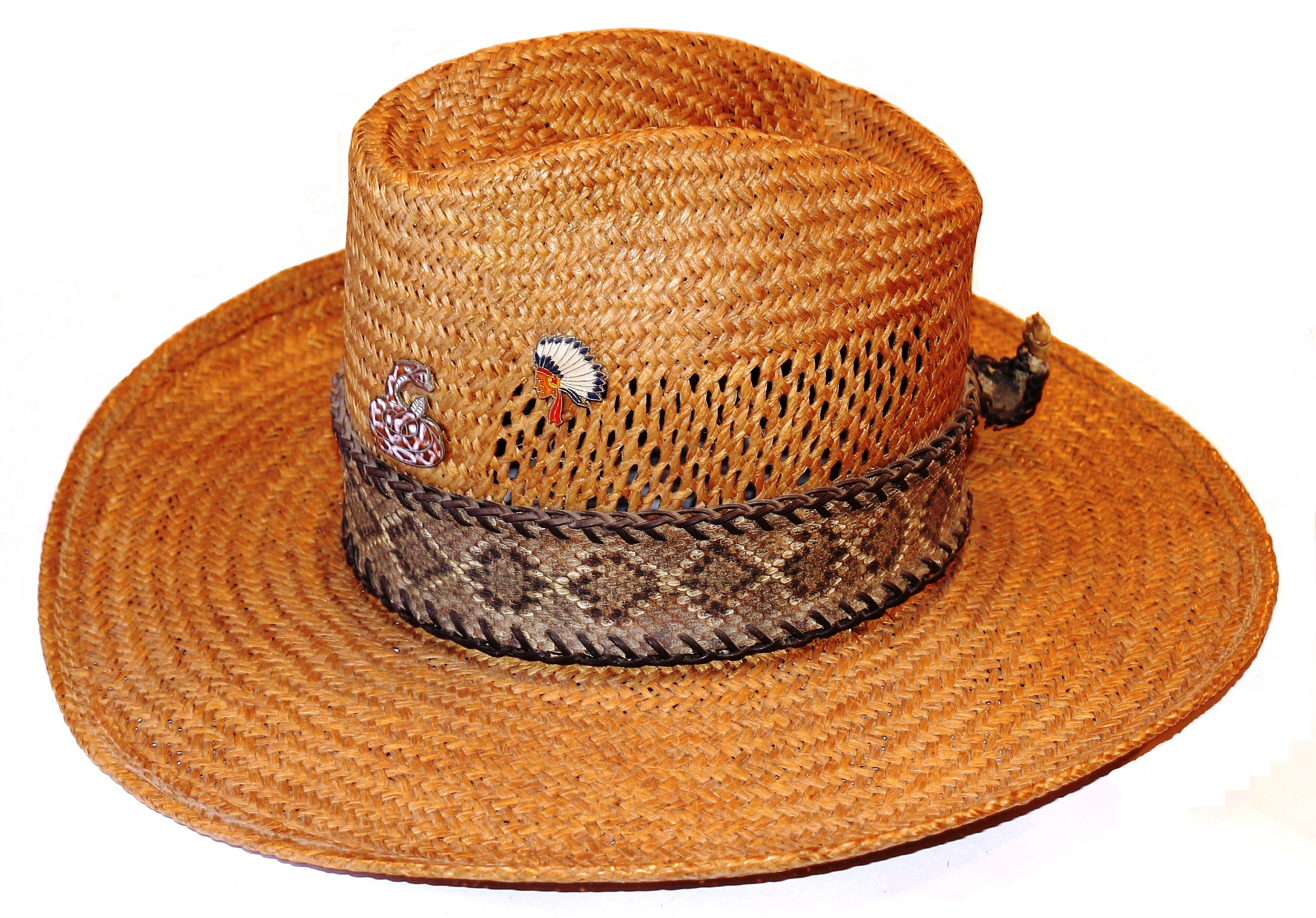
A straw hat

There are several styles of straw hats that are made of woven straw.

Many thousands of women and children in England (primarily in the Luton district of Bedfordshire), and large numbers in the United States (mostly Massachusetts), were employed in plaiting straw for making hats. By the late 19th century, vast quantities of plaits were being imported to England from Canton in China, and in the United States most of the straw plait was imported.

A fiber analogous to straw is obtained from the plant Carludovica palmata, and is used to make Panama hats.

Traditional Japanese rain protection consisted of a straw hat and a mino cape.

==== Music ====
In areas of pastoral Europe, straw may be used to create a type of simple, reeded wind instrument known to English speakers as the oaten pipe, although similar instruments are known to be made in Turkey and the Middle east, and north Africa.

==== Sediment control ====
Straw bales are sometimes used for sediment control at construction sites. However, bales are often ineffective in protecting water quality and are maintenance-intensive. For these reasons the U.S. Environmental Protection Agency (EPA) and various state agencies recommend use of alternative sediment control practices where possible, such as silt fences, fiber rolls and geotextiles.

They can also be used as burned area emergency response, as ground cover or as in-stream check dams.

==== Rope ====
Rope made from straw was used by thatchers, in the packaging industry and even in iron foundries.

Saekki is a traditional Korean rope made of woven straw.

==== Packaging ====
Straw is resistant to being crushed and therefore makes a good packing material. A company in France makes a straw mat sealed in thin plastic sheets.

Straw envelopes for wine bottles have become rarer, but are still to be found at some wine merchants.

Wheat straw is also used in compostable food packaging such as compostable plates. Packaging made from wheat straw can be certified compostable and will biodegrade in a commercial composting environment.

==== Shoes ====
The Chinese wore cailu or caixie, shoes and sandals made of straw, well into modernity.

Koreans wear jipsin, sandals made of straw.

Several types of traditional Japanese shoes, such as waraji and zōri, are made of straw.

In some parts of Germany like Black Forest and Hunsrück people wear straw shoes at home or at carnival.

==== Targets ====
Heavy-gauge straw rope is coiled and sewn tightly together to make archery targets. This is no longer done entirely by hand, but is partially mechanised. Sometimes a paper or plastic target is set up in front of straw bales, which serve to support the target and provide a safe backdrop.

==== Thatching ====
Thatching uses straw, reed or similar materials to make a waterproof, lightweight roof with good insulation properties. Straw for this purpose (often wheat straw) is grown specially and harvested using a reaper-binder.

=== Fuel source ===
The use of straw as a carbon-neutral energy source is increasing rapidly. Straw or hay briquettes are a biofuel substitute to coal.

The use of straw in large-scale biomass power plants is becoming mainstream in the EU, with several facilities already online. The straw is either used directly in the form of bales, or densified into pellets which allows for the feedstock to be transported over longer distances. First generation pellets are limited to a co-firing rate of 15% in modern IGCC plants.

Pre-treatment of straw enhances its structural, chemical and combustion properties. Torrefaction (a mild pyrolysis) increases the energy density of straw, making it possible to transport it still further. This processing step also makes storage much easier, because torrefied straw pellets are hydrophobic. Torrefied straw in the form of pellets can be directly co-fired with coal or natural gas at very high rates and make use of the processing infrastructures at existing coal and gas plants. Because the torrefied straw pellets have superior structural, chemical and combustion properties to coal, they can replace all coal and turn a coal plant into an entirely biomass-fed power station.

Another pre-treatment method is steam explosion (an explosion of straw internals triggered by the withdrawal of high-pressure steam). It is not useful for flax straw.

=== Chemical feedstock ===
Pyrolysis of straw produces a wide range of heterocytes (including alkaloids), lignins, phenols, flavonoids, and steroids. Some of these are fine chemicals of potential economic value.

==== Bioplastic ====
Rice straw, an agricultural waste which is not usually recovered, can be turned into a cellulose-based bioplastic with mechanical properties akin to polystyrene in its dry state.

==== Biofuel feedstock ====
Besides being burned directly, straw is a feedstock for conversion into various fine biofuels including biomethane (biogas), bioethanol, biobutanol, and biodiesel.

Straw, processed first as briquettes, has been fed into a biogas plant in Aarhus University, Denmark, in a test to see if higher gas yields could be attained.

=== Horticulture ===
Straw is used in cucumber houses and for mushroom growing.

In Japan, certain trees are wrapped with straw belts known as komomaki to protect them from the effects of a hard winter as well as to trap parasite insects.

It is also used in ponds to reduce algae by changing the nutrient ratios in the water.

The soil under strawberries is covered with straw to protect the ripe berries from dirt, and straw is also used to cover the plants during winter to prevent the cold from killing them.

Straw also makes an excellent mulch.

==== Soil substitute ====
When properly conditioned, straw bales can be used as a perfect soil substitute. Straw bale gardening is also popular among gardeners who do not have enough space for soil gardening.

=== Paper ===
Straw can be pulped to make paper.

== Health and safety ==
Dried straw presents a fire hazard that can ignite easily if exposed to sparks or an open flame. It can also trigger allergic rhinitis in people who are hypersensitive to airborne allergens such as straw dust.

== See also ==
- Corn stover (corn straw)
- Crop residue
- Drinking straw
- Hay
- Straw (colour)
- Sheaf (agriculture), a bundle of straw
- Stook, a stack of straw
- Straw dog
- Wood wool
- Yule Goat
