= Garb =

Garb may refer to:

- Clothing
- Garb, a wheat sheaf (agriculture) in heraldry
