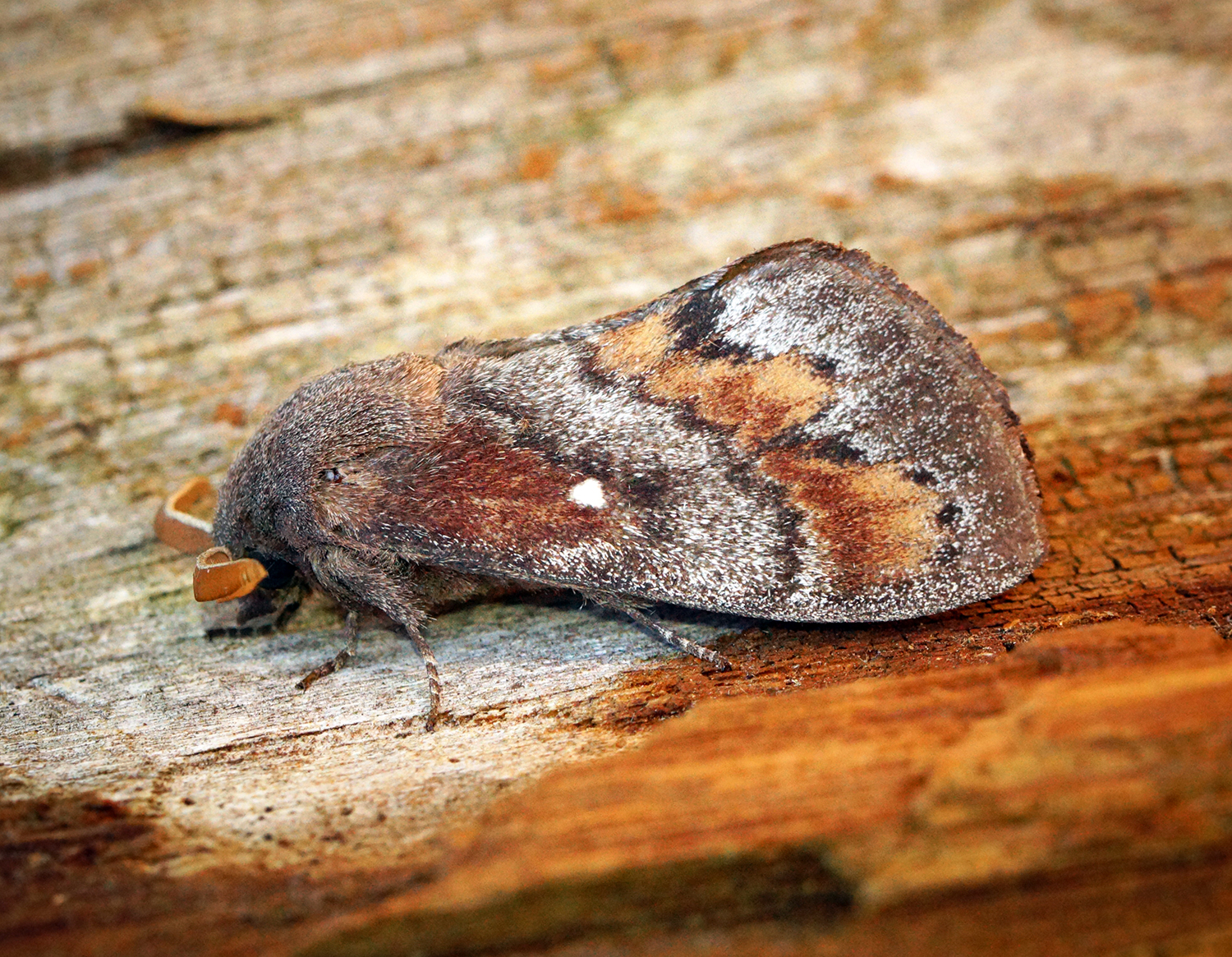

Scientific classification
- Kingdom: Animalia
- Phylum: Arthropoda
- Clade: Pancrustacea
- Class: Insecta
- Order: Lepidoptera
- Family: Lasiocampidae
- Genus: Dendrolimus
- Species: D. pini

Binomial name
- Dendrolimus pini (Linnaeus, 1758)

= Dendrolimus pini =

Pine-tree lappet

Pest of conifers

Dendrolimus pini, the pine tree lappet moth or pine moth, is a forestry pest species, a defoliator of conifers. It belongs to the order Lepidoptera and is one of many lappet moths in the Lasiocampidae family. First described by Carl Linnaeus in the 10th edition of his Systema Naturae (1758), it has a wide geographic range and has since been documented in Europe, Asia, and North Africa. D. pini has a preference for the Scots pine (Pinus sylvestris), its main host.

The moth is capable of defoliating entire stands of pine trees during major outbreaks, which can last several years. Outbreaks have ended naturally with buildups of parasitoids and pathogens that affect a large percentage of moths in a population.

== Etymology ==
The scientific name Dendrolimus pini has both Greek and Latin roots. The prefix "dendro" is from Greek δένδρον dendron, "tree". The suffix "limus" is Latin for "mud", which may be a reference to the moth's coloration. The epithet "pini" is the genitive of the Latin for "pine".

== Description ==
=== Eggs ===
When first laid, the eggs are initially blue-green in colour, but over time they lose their colour, fading into a gray. The eggs are approximately 2 mm in size and take about 14 days to hatch.

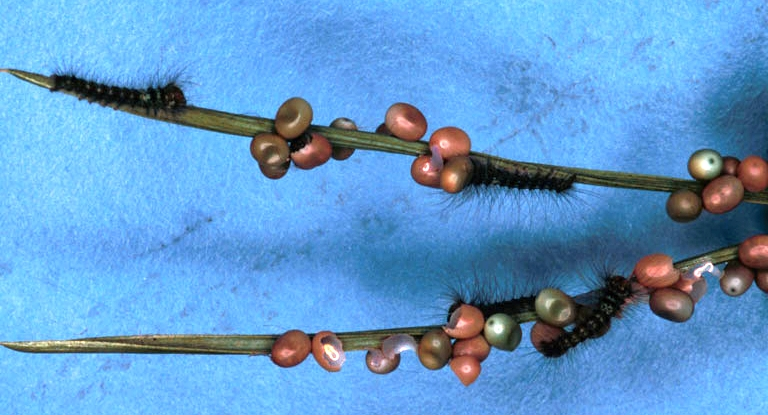
Eggs and hatching larvae

=== Larvae ===
Larvae reach an approximate length of 2-3 inches. The caterpillar's thorax is covered in black hairs and made up of thick alternating steel-blue bands; the abdominal segments have a black mark bordered by irregular white lines. The pupation stage lasts about two weeks. During this time, the larvae create a cocoon, usually attached to branches or crevices in the bark of tree crowns, with varying coloration. These loose, partially transparent cocoons vary from yellow-brown to deep black and are often marked with steel-blue hairs.

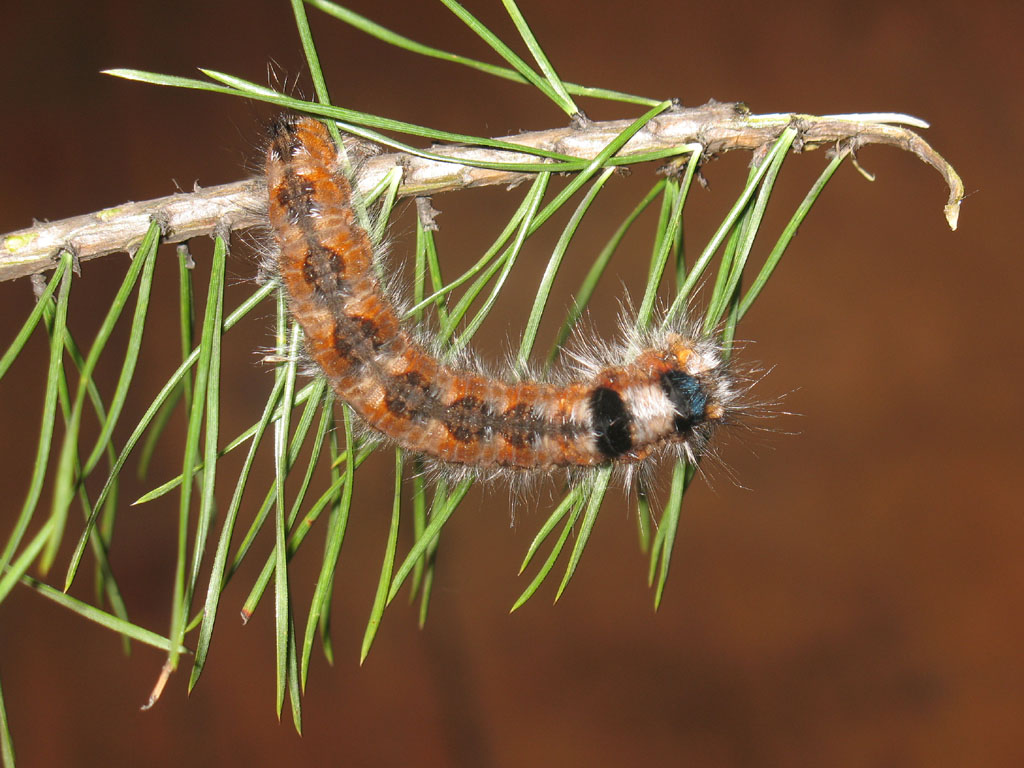
Larva

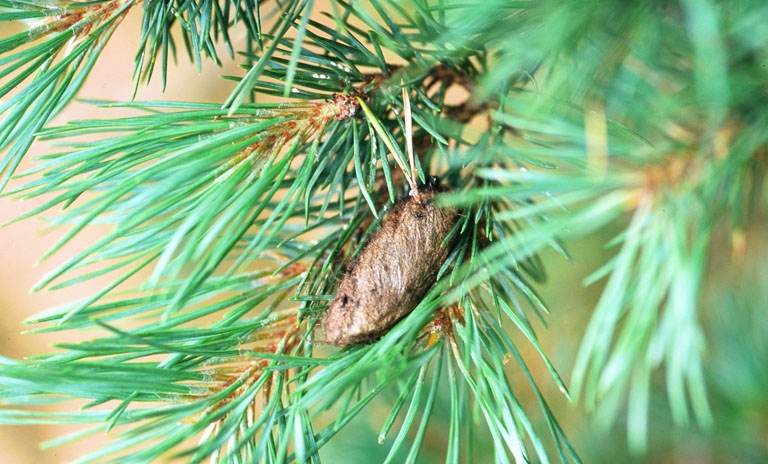
Pupa phase: cocoon

=== Adults ===
Adult D. pini can reach a size of 2 to 3 1/2 inches. Females of this species are generally larger. The typical wingspan of the females ranges between 70 and 90 mm, while the smaller males' wingspan falls within 50–70 mm. The females are adapted to be laden with eggs and are thought to be used for short distances, whereas the males can disperse several kilometers to facilitate mate-seeking. In addition to being smaller, males of this species are usually darker than females. The forewings of this moth are gray-brown to brown with a lateral band (reddish brown) and a non-uniform stripe along the edges (dark-brown to black). Hind wings are red-brown to gray-brown.

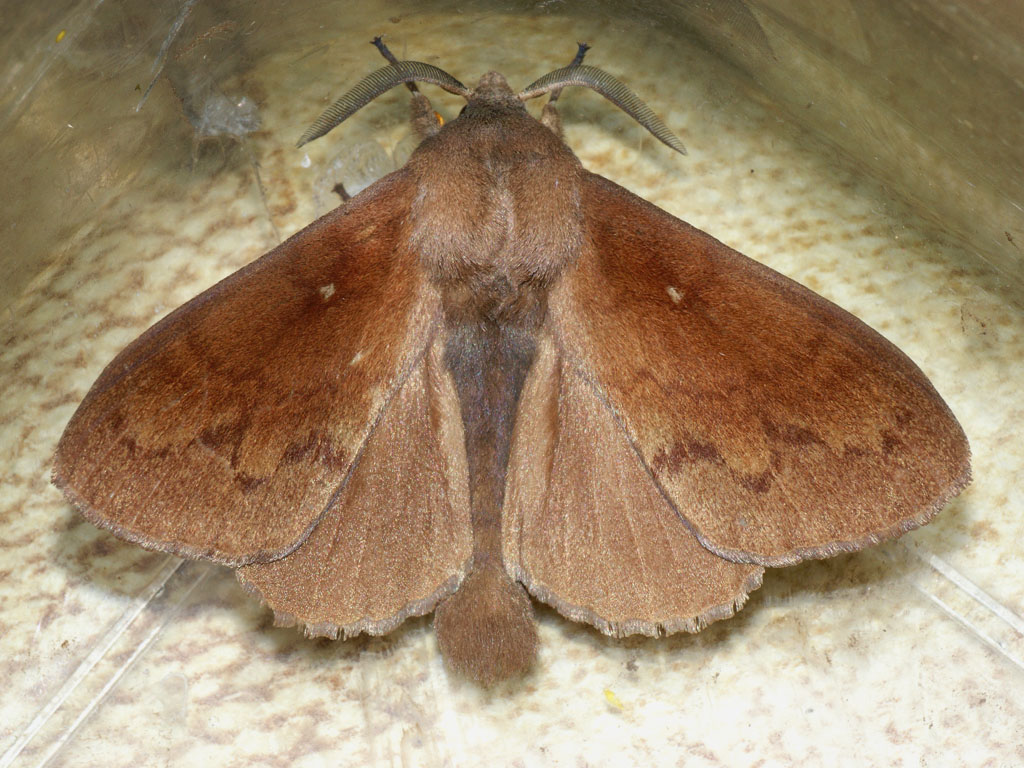
Male

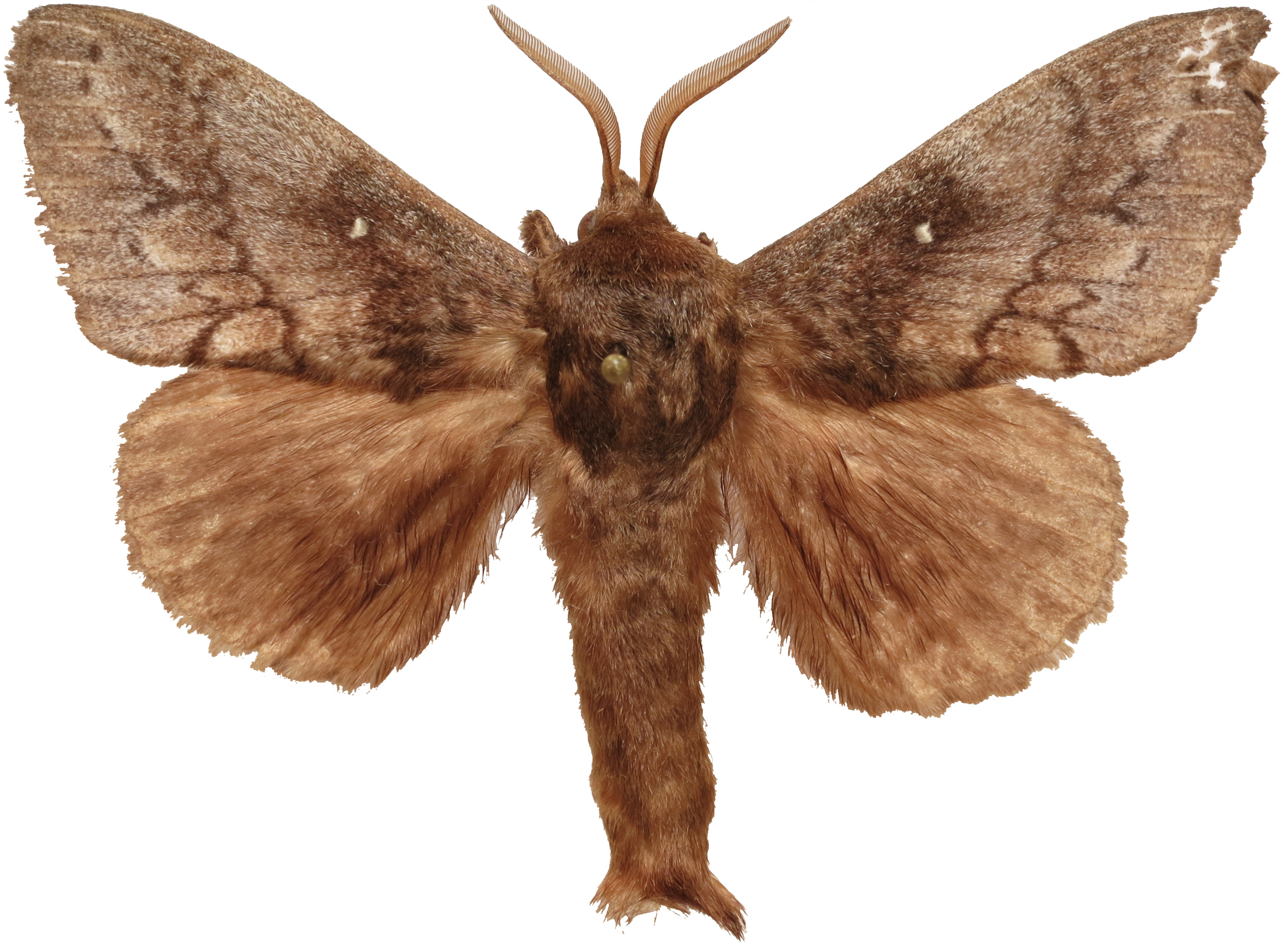
Pinned male

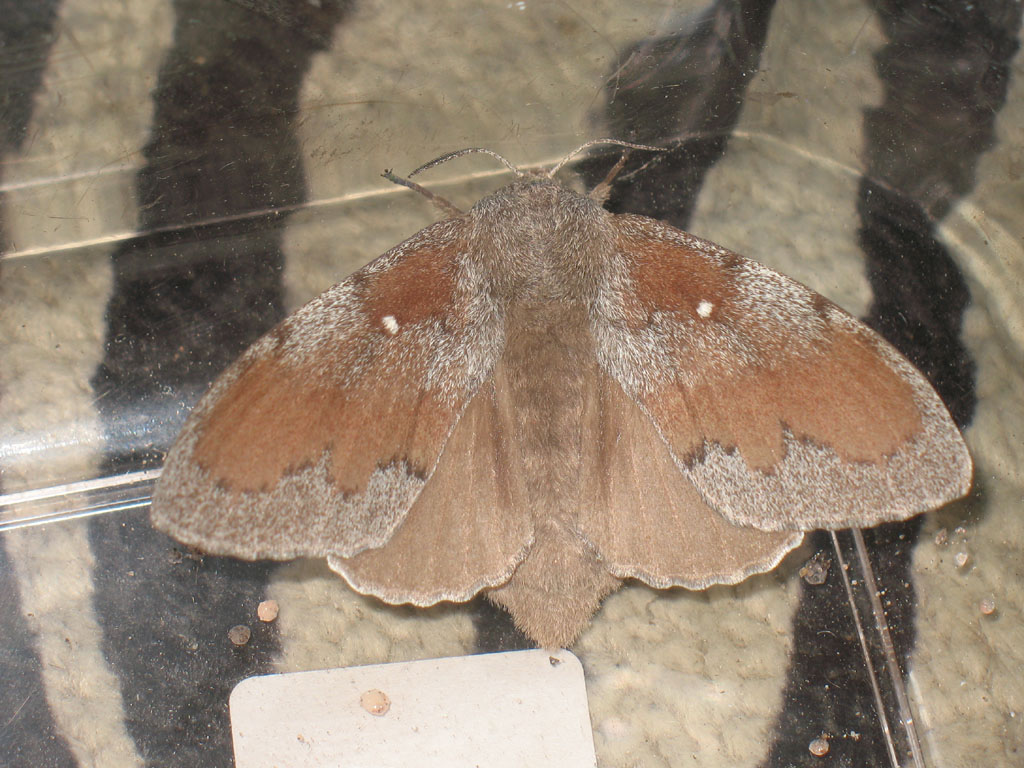
Female

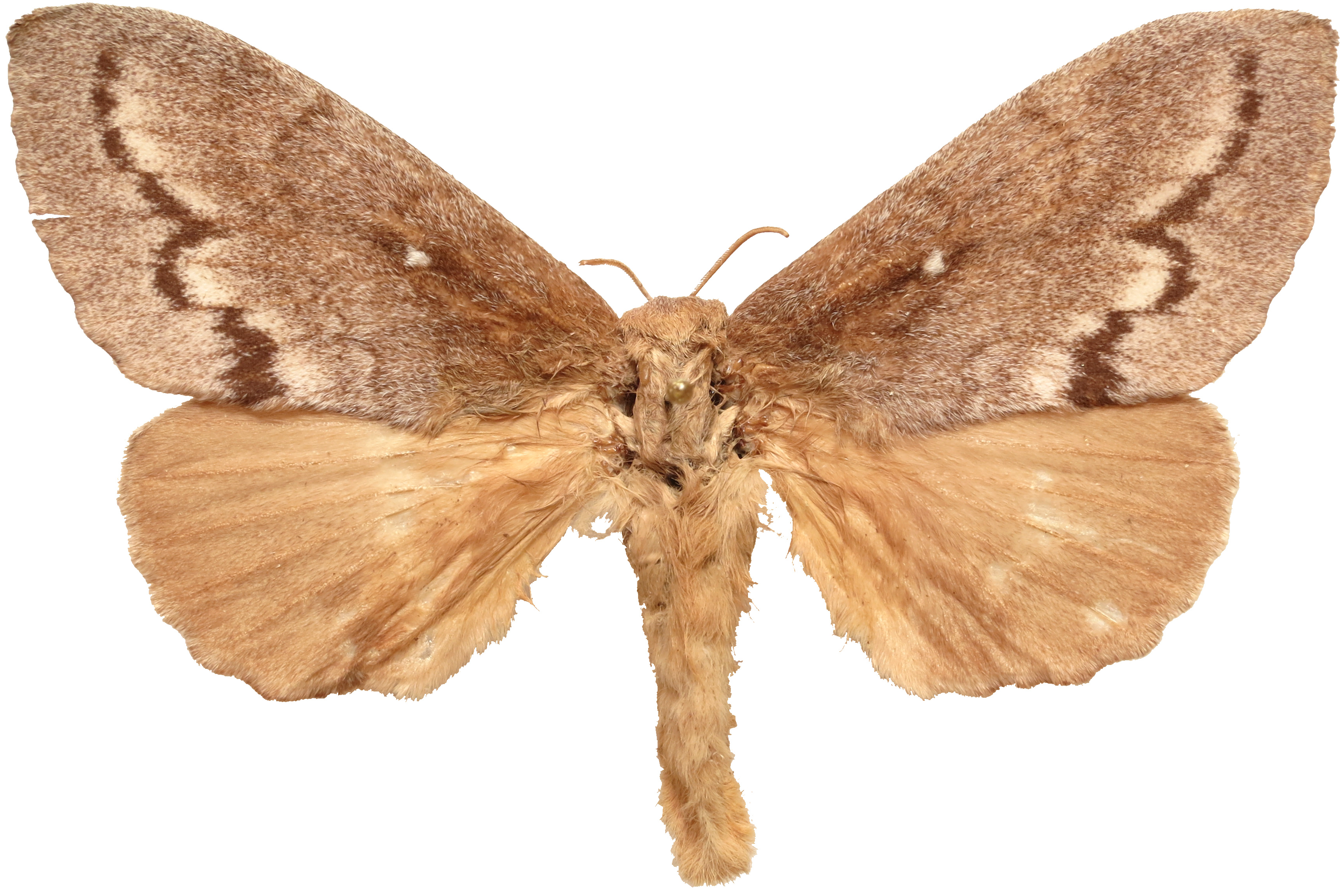
Pinned female

== Life cycle ==
Depending on the climate and habitat, the pine moth has a varying growth cycle of one to three years. Swarms begin in July and August, laying their eggs on the host trees. D. pini are capable of dispersing through wind, which may achieve greater distances, or through crawling. Female D. pini lay 150-300 eggs in aggregations of up to 100 eggs. Eggs are most often laid on the needles of P. sylvestris, but also on branches and trunks. Once hatched, the larvae first feed on egg shells before seeking uninfested trees to consume the bark of young shoots or up to 1000 needles each. Come October and November, the larvae stop feeding and move to the tree litter, where they remain over the winter. After snowmelt, around February to March, the larvae climb the trees again and feed on the tree crowns, resulting in mass defoliation. Pupation occurs by late May or early June, and adults emerge after about four weeks. Adult D. pini do not feed, which allows them to live for approximately 9 to 10 days. From larvae to adult moth, D. pini undergoes up to an estimated eight instars, which is dependent on the conditions during larval development. Due to the sex size difference, female D. pini moths undergo more instars than the males. In warmer climates, D. pini has a single generation per year (univoltine), whereas in cooler regions, the larvae overwinter twice, resulting in a development period of approximately two years (semivoltine). The species has a wide geographic range and has since been documented in Europe, Asia, and North Africa.

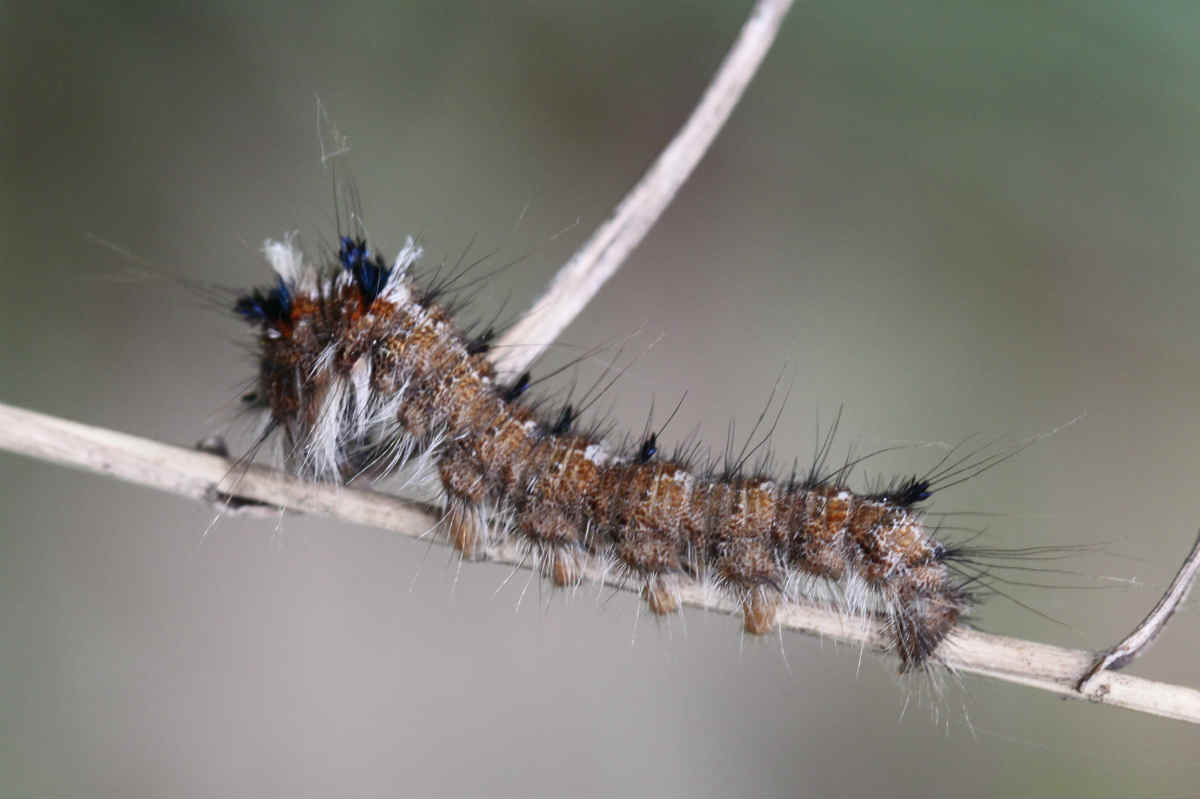
Caterpillar larva

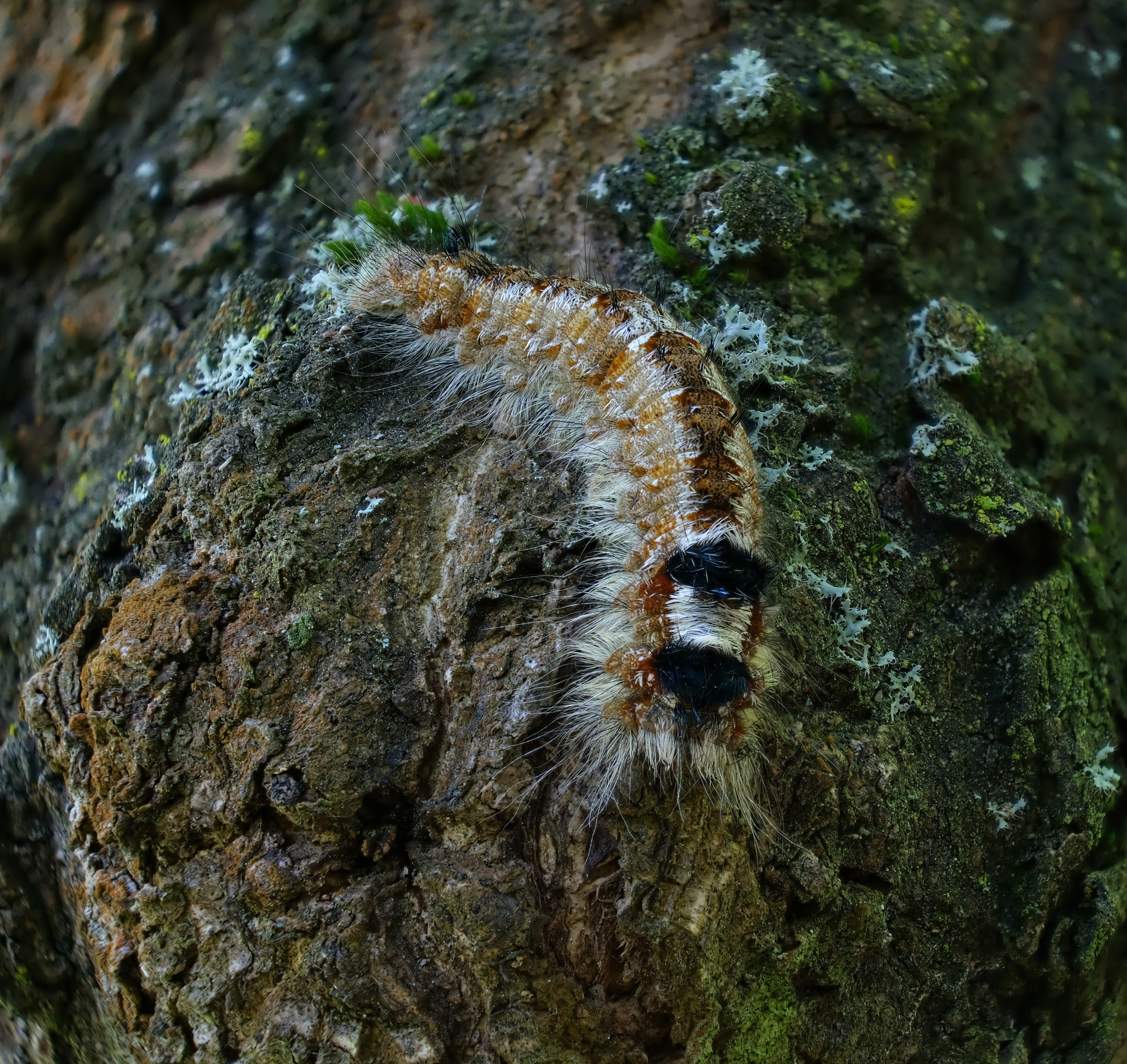
Caterpillar on tree trunk

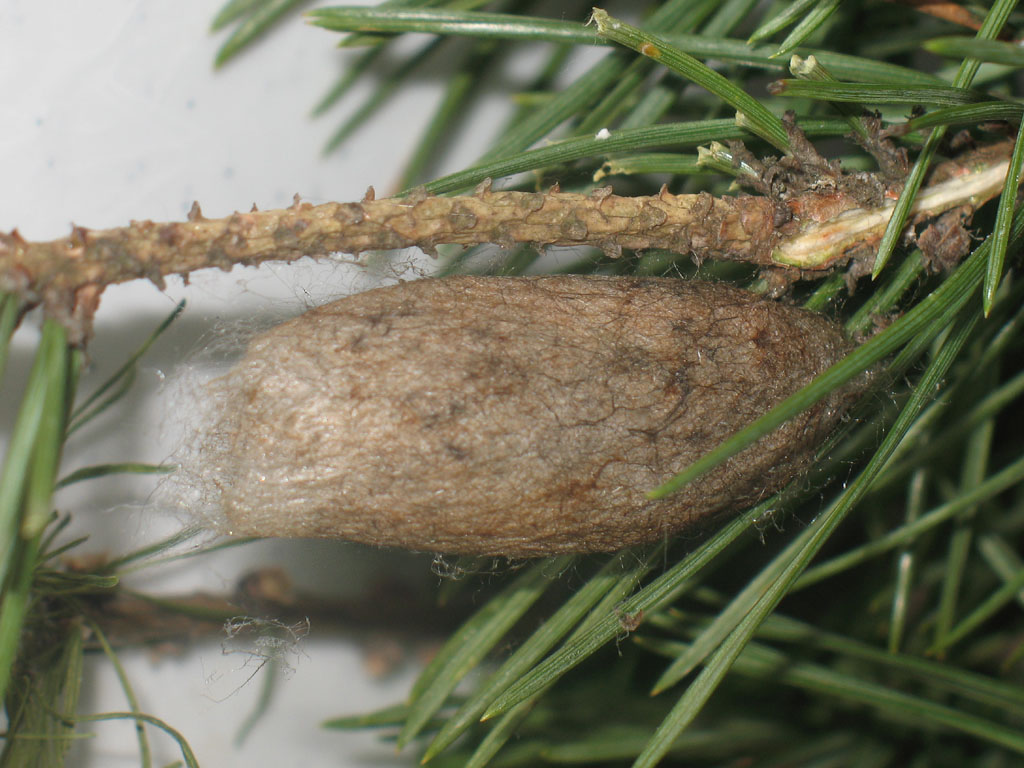
Cocoon

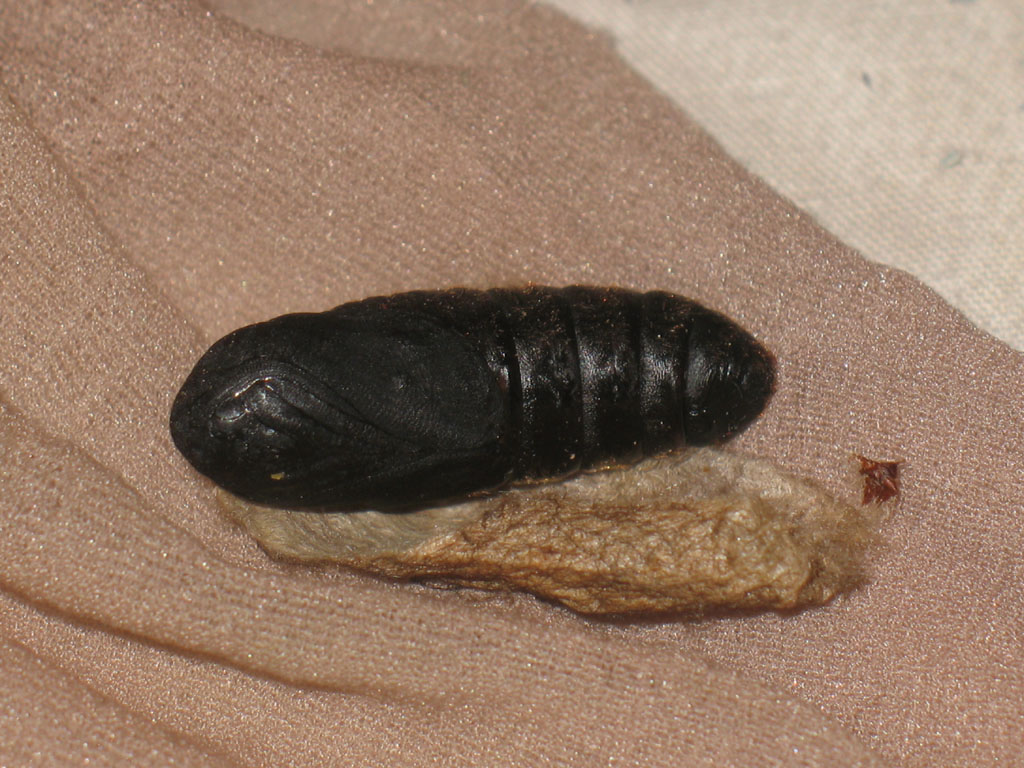
Pupa

== Ecology ==
=== Predators and parasites ===
Illustration from Die Schmetterlinge Deutschlands of pine lappet moth life-cycle stages: eggs (a: fresh; b: older; m: with parasitic wasp exit holes), caterpillars (c, d: young; e: older); cocoon (f); pupa (g, h: with emerging adult); male (i); female (k); with parasitoid wasps (n: "Chrysolampus solitarius"; o, p: cocoons and adult "Microgaster nemorum") that prey on it

Like most moths, some of the pine lappet's primary predators are birds. The cuckoo, golden oriole, starling, coal tit, jay, thrush, rook, jackdaw, chaffinch, and woodpecker are most common. In addition to birds, mammals such as bats and moles are primary predators. Bird and mammal predators can target both larvae and adults.

The fungal pathogen of insects Beauveria bassiana was shown to have caused a collapse in Aleppo pine forestry in Croatia in 2018. The fungus was found in 98.4% of the dead caterpillars examined. Another entomopathogenic fungus, Cordyceps militaris, helped to end the 1964–1975 outbreak of the moth in Poland.

Insect parasitoids rank among the primary predators of the moth. In Croatia, up to 5.6% of the larvae were parasitised by the tachinid fly Drino inconspicua. Other parasitoids of the moth include braconid wasps belonging to the two genera Apanteles and Meteorus, which together helped to end the 1947–1952 outbreak of D. pini in Poland and Eastern Germany. Parasitoid wasps of another genus, Telenomus (Scelionidae), can parasitise 60% or more of the moths during a major outbreak, and have been considered as biological controls.

=== Diet ===
While D. pini is considered oligophagous with a preferred and primary host of Pinus sylvestris, the moth can adapt to other European and North American pine species, or to trees with two to three needle fascicles. Research has examined the extent of this diet to assess the risk potential this moth poses. It was found that feeding on tree species similar to their host resulted in little mortality in the experimental context, where growth, development, and morphological parameters were optimal when D. pini fed on American pine species and pine species with three needles in a fascicle. D. pini were less capable of adapting to five-needle fascicles species. and experienced clogged digestive systems if fed with dry needles or leaf tissues. D.pini attacks healthy forests that are over 60 years old.

Tree species that D. pini can develop fully on are:

- Pinus sylvestris (Scots pine, the main host)
- Picea abies (Norway spruce)
- Pinus contorta (lodgepole pine)
- Pinus cembra (Swiss pine)
- Pinus nigra (black pine)
- Pinus ponderosa (ponderosa pine)
- Pinus strobus (eastern white pine)

=== Defence ===
The larvae of D. pini are fuzzy with spicule hairs. These are relatively long, slender hairs that come to a sharp tip. Dendrolimiasis (illness associated with caterpillars of this species) is caused through contact with these hairs on living or dead larvae or the cocoons. When the spicule wall is broken, a discharge of a toxin is released, which can cause maculopapular dermatitis, migratory inflammatory polyarthritis, migratory inflammatory polychondritis, and chronic osteoarthritis. D. pini loses these urticating hairs in its adult stage, relying mostly on camouflage. The exuviae of D. pini contain dehydroabietic acid, which the insect most likely acquires through eating the pine. This acid may make them more resistant to fungal infections.

== Environmental impact ==
Scots pine forest almost completely defoliated by D. pini, Brandenburg, Germany

Swarms of D. pini can cause mass defoliation of forests, damaging the forestry industry. Defoliation can result in reduced growth, disease, and, most severely, death and die-back of trees; these factors make forests more vulnerable to other pests. Numerous factors that can increase the risk of D. pini spread and outbreak. Climate change is predicted to have both increased the D. pini populations in Scotland and increased the voltinism of the species. Terrain can significantly impact forest susceptibility, with flat or hilly terrains being the most at risk. Other factors include nutritionally poor and highly permeable soil, areas with water shortages or with improper forest management, and trees older than 60 years. D. pini cannot travel very far by themselves, but factors of globalization, international travel and trade in wood all contribute to the spread of insect species to new, distant sites. D. pini larvae can survive without food for a month, enabling them to invade new forests when transported accidentally by humans.

== Control measures ==
Biological controls have been employed to regulate the population of D. pini in soil. These organisms are categorized into three groups: entomopathogenic fungi, bacteria, and nematodes. There are various species of nematodes and fungi used however Bacillus thuringiensis is the only species of bacteria that is used in D. pini population control. Chemical insecticides, mainly neonicotinoids, and classic pheromone traps are other means of population control.

=== Traps ===
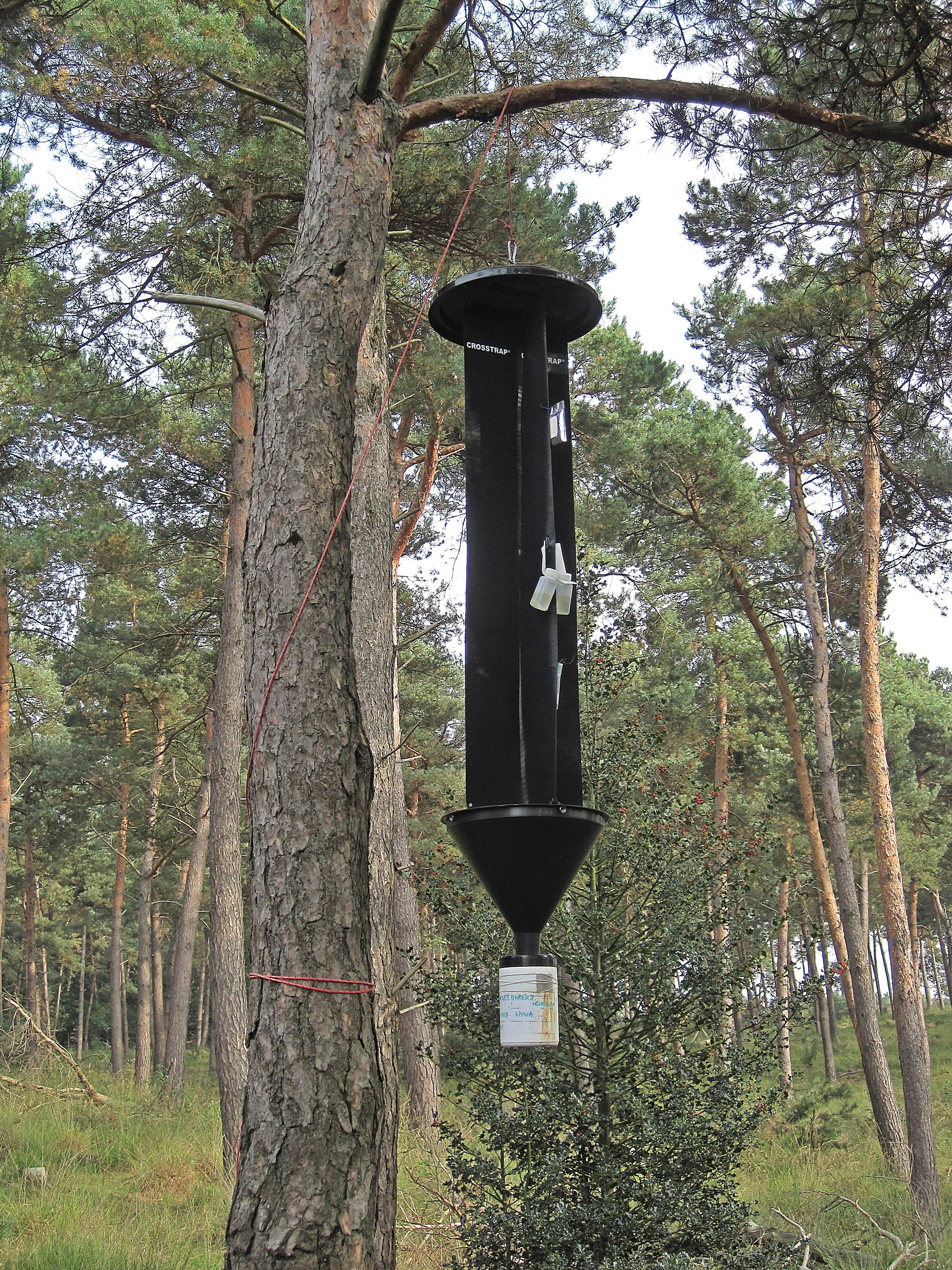
A cross-vane pheromone trap in a pine forest

Numerous types of traps are used to catch these pests prior to a devastating breakout, the most effective of which are cross-vane and bucket traps baited with polyethylene vials of pheromone. These vials can be more effective in attracting male D. pini on their own than other traps, such as a rubber cylinder trap. The traps are placed 5-6m above the ground for optimal capture, but they are still effective at breast height; it is crucial that the trap's height remains constant.

=== Fungi ===
Treating D. pini with entomopathogenic fungal species has pathogenic properties, effectively limiting the population of the pine moth. The larvae of D. pini have both a hairy surface and a thin cuticle; these characteristics make infection by fungi easier. Many fungal species have been known to infect the pine moth larvae: Isaria fumosorosea, Cordyceps militaris, Conidiobolus coronatus, Metarhizium anisopliae, and Beauveria bassiana are the most effective. There are two ways these can minimize the harmful effects of these moths: a reduction in the feeding behaviours of infected larvae and high mortality of young.

=== Nematodes ===
Two genera of nematodes are used to control D. pini: Steinernema and Heterorhabditis. Both nematodes have a symbiotic relationship with bacteria (genera Xenorhabdus and Photorhabdus, respectively). The key benefit of using nematodes is that they actively search for the host. Some experiments have shown that certain nematode strains can cause a mortality rate of 95–100% in D. pini larvae. One method of using them is by applying a water suspension containing nematodes to the tree litter, where the larvae remain over the winter; this reduces D. pini by 40–50%.
