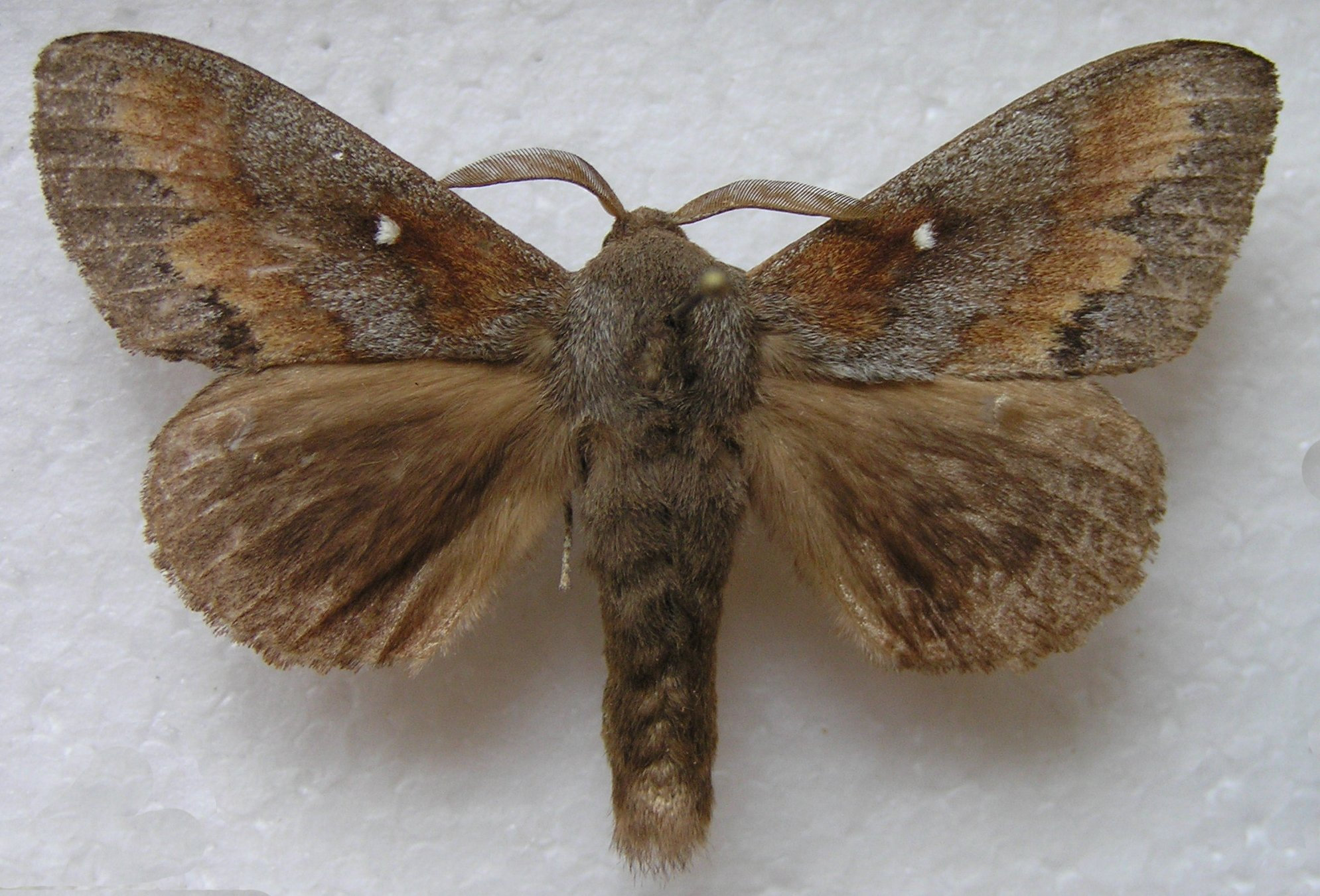
- Dendrolimus pini

Scientific classification
- Domain: Eukaryota
- Kingdom: Animalia
- Phylum: Arthropoda
- Class: Insecta
- Order: Lepidoptera
- Family: Lasiocampidae
- Subfamily: Lasiocampinae
- Tribe: Pinarini
- Genus: Dendrolimus; Germar, 1812

Species
- See text

Synonyms
- Eutricha Stephens, 1829; Ptilorhina Zetterstedt, 1839; Dendrolimis Marschner, 1909; Dendrolymus Spuler, 1903; Hoenimnema de Lajonquière; Oeona Walker, 1855

= Dendrolimus =

Genus of moths

Dendrolimus is a genus of moths in the family Lasiocampidae. The genus was erected by Ernst Friedrich Germar in 1812.

== Species ==
Species include:

- Dendrolimus arizanus (Wileman, 1910)
- Dendrolimus kikuchii Matsumura, 1927
- Dendrolimus pini (Linnaeus, 1758)
- Dendrolimus punctatus (Walker, 1855)
- Dendrolimus spectabilis (Butler, 1877)
- Dendrolimus superans (Butler, 1877)
- Dendrolimus taiwanus (Matsumura, 1932)
