= Camgrain =

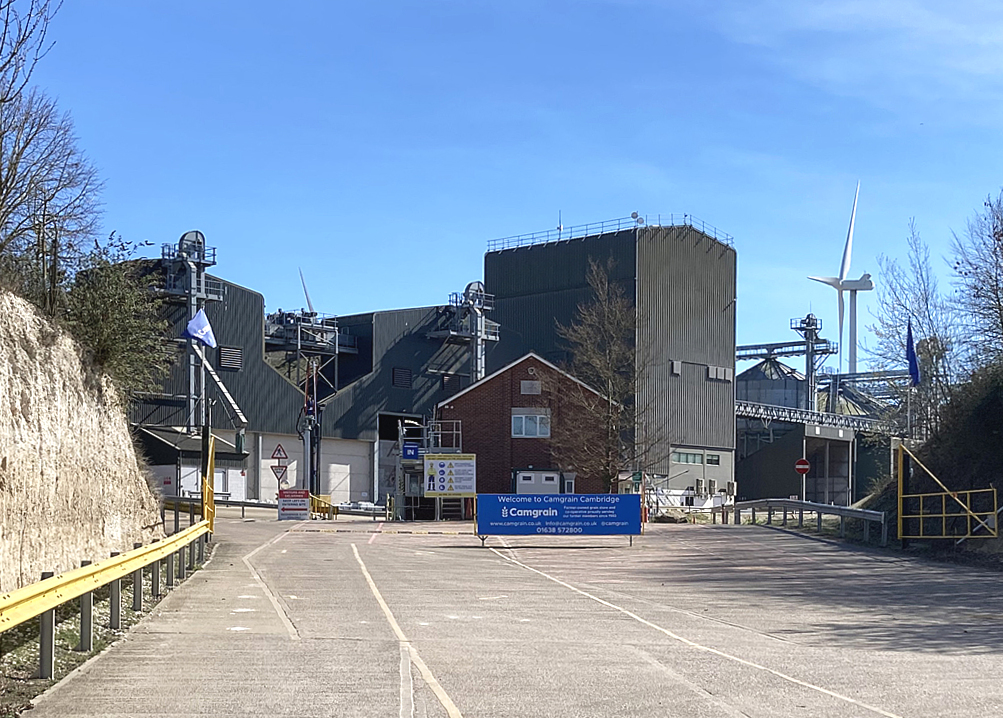
Premises outside Cambridge, UK

Camgrain is a British agricultural cooperative based in Balsham, Cambridgeshire that dries and stores grain. It was founded in 1983 by a group of farmers.

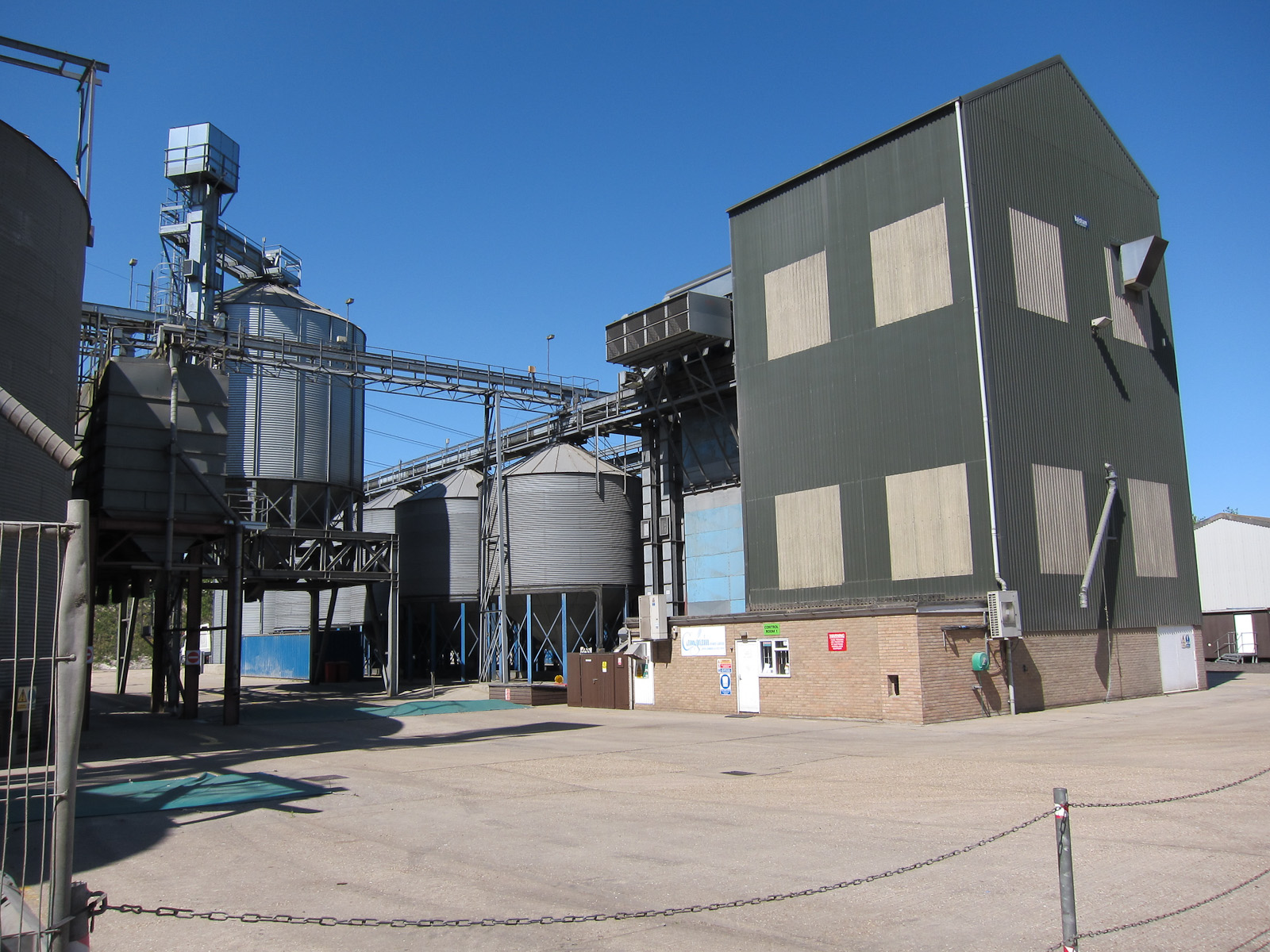
Premises in Linton, Cambridgeshire

In 2025 it handled approximately 500,000 tonnes of grain per year.
