= Zygobothria =

Scientific classification
- Kingdom: Animalia
- Phylum: Arthropoda
- Class: Insecta
- Order: Diptera
- Family: Tachinidae
- Subfamily: Exoristinae
- Tribe: Eryciini
- Genus: Drino
- Subgenus: Zygobothria; Mik, 1891

Type species
- Sturmia atropivora Robineau-Desvoidy, 1830

Synonyms
- Formosodoria Townsend, 1933

Genus of flies

Zygobothria is a subgenus of flies in the family Tachinidae.

== Species ==
- Drino atra Liang & Chao, 1998
- Drino atropivora (Robineau-Desvoidy, 1830)
- Drino ciliata (Wulp, 1881)
- Drino grandicornis Mesnil, 1977
- Drino hirtmacula (Liang & Chao, 1990)
- Drino longiseta Chao & Liang, 1998
- Drino lugens (Mesnil, 1944)
- Drino pollinosa Chao & Liang, 1998
- Drino trifida (Wulp, 1890)
