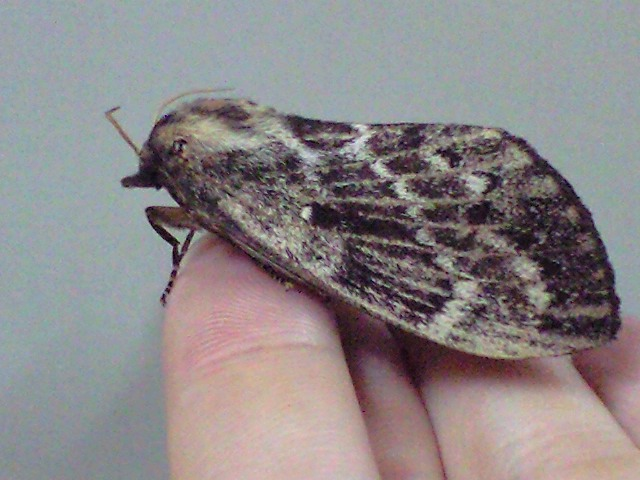

Scientific classification
- Kingdom: Animalia
- Phylum: Arthropoda
- Clade: Pancrustacea
- Class: Insecta
- Order: Lepidoptera
- Family: Lasiocampidae
- Genus: Dendrolimus
- Species: D. spectabilis

Binomial name
- Dendrolimus spectabilis (Butler, 1877)

Synonyms
- Odonestis spectabilis Butler, 1877; Gastropacha pini Matsumura, 1898; Eutricha remotus Leech, 1888; Oeona segregatus Butler, 1877

= Dendrolimus spectabilis =

Species of moth

Dendrolimus spectabilis, the pine moth or matsukareha in Japan, is a moth in the family Lasiocampidae.

== Distribution ==
It is found in China, Korea, and Japan.

== Host plants and damage ==
Larva

The Japanese straw mats named komomaki were created to protect pine trees from the moth.
