= Stook =

Stack of cereal plant sheaves before threshing

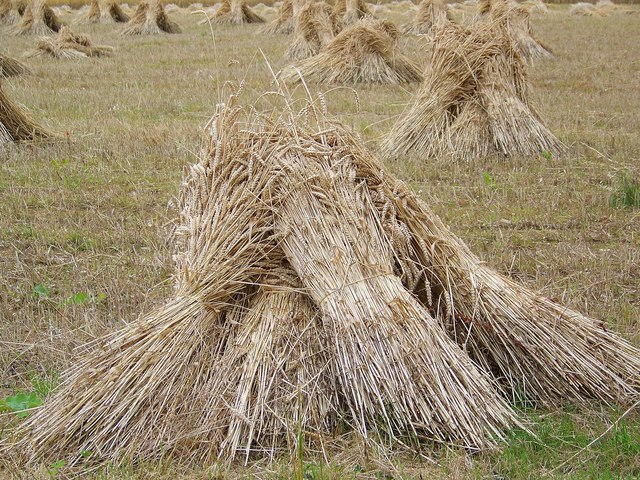
Wheat sheaves near King's Somborne, England arranged into a stook.

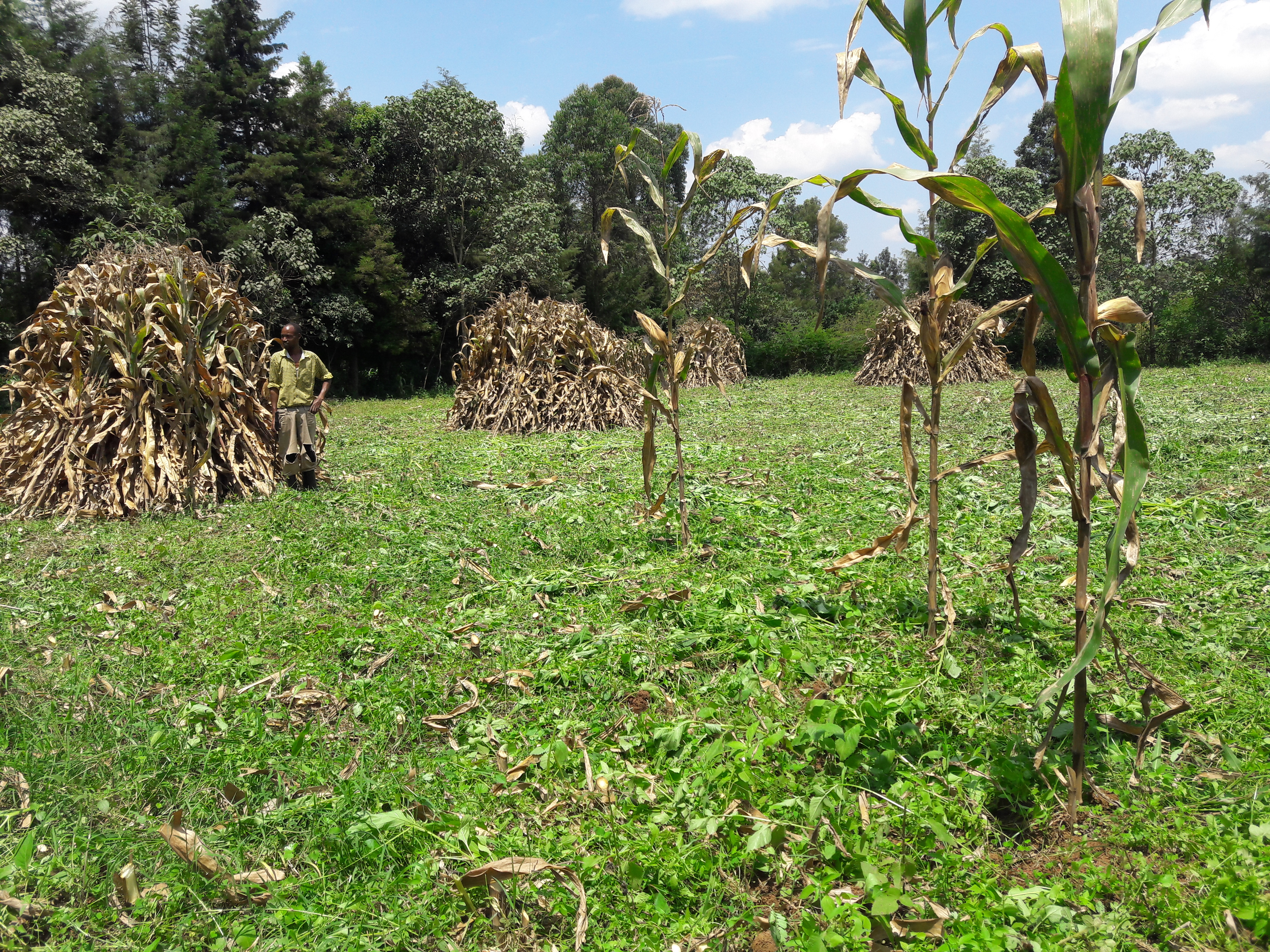
Stooking maize in Kenya.

A stook /stʊk/, shock, Aisle (North Somerset), Kiver (Cheshire/Staffordshire)(pronounced Kivver), or stack, (although the word stack more usually refers to larger amounts of cereal crops or hay stored in a barn or stackyard) is an arrangement by which bound sheaves of cut grain-stalks, complete with the grain, are placed with their butts on the ground, leaning together so as to keep the grain-heads off the ground during the period when left in the field. This is after the crop has been cut with a reaper binder and before collection from the field to the barn or for threshing. Before reaper binders came into use around 1900, the cereal crop would have been cut by scythe or with a finger-bar mowing machine, and the stalks gathered into sheaves by hand and tied with a straw binding called a bont. Stooked grain sheaves are typically wheat, barley, rye and oats. In the era before combine harvesters and powered grain driers, stooking was necessary so as to further ripen, dry and harden the grain. The stooks remained in the field for a period of time. Agricultural folklore suggested that the stook needed to hear three church bells; that is for at least fifteen days, to achieve a moisture level low enough for safe storage. If weather conditions dictated, two sheaves from each stook were removed and replaced, butt end up, with the stems spread to cover and protect the heads of the sheaves below. This was called hooding. Stooks were usually tipped over, butts to the sun and wind, a few hours drying before being loaded on the wagons for transport to the stack. In the 21st century, most grain is cut and harvested with combine harvesters, with the grain taken straight to the store and the straw baled. However, stooking remains useful to smallholders who grow their own grain, or at least some of it, as opposed to buying it.

== Overview ==
The purpose of a stook [or 'stooking'] is to dry the unthreshed grain while protecting it from vermin until it is brought into long-term storage. The unthreshed grain also cures while in a stook. In England, sheaves were commonly stacked in stooks of six or eight.

Stook may also have a general meaning of 'bundle' or 'heap' and applicable to items other than sheaves or bales. For example, in the era when traditional hay-making was common, raked-up piles of hay were also called stooks, shocks, or ricks. Today baling has largely replaced the stook method of drying hay, or hay is chopped and ensilaged either in silos or on the ground inside polymer wrappers to make haylage.

In North America, a stook may also refer to a field stack of six, ten or fifteen small (70–90 lb (30–40 kg)), rectangular bales of hay or straw. These bales may be stacked and deposited by a "stooking machine" or "stooker" that is dragged, sled-like, behind the baler. The stooking sled has four, five, or six fingers that hold the bales until the stook is complete. When the stook is complete the "stacker" steps on a lever to release the stook. The fingers drop to the ground and the finished stook slides off the fingers. The sled resets itself and is ready to be filled again. The bales are stacked on the diagonal to shed the rain and to minimise acquiring moisture from the ground before being picked up. An automatic bale stooker was eventually designed to eliminate the need for a person to manually stack and trip the stook-release. The automatic stooker is positioned behind the baler and collects released bales and sends them up an inclined shute. The bale falls through a series of bars into the "3-2-1" configuration. Once all six bales are in position the platform trips, drops the stook in the field, and automatically returns to the loading position. Allied produced a model of stooker in the 1980s that can still be found across the countryside in Canada today.

== Shocking or stooking ==
Before mechanical harvesting became the norm, a common agricultural practice was to manually cut sheaves of grain, tie them in bundles, and stack them against one another vertically to form a "shock" so that they could air dry. In the era before combine harvesters and powered grain driers, stooking was necessary to dry the grain for a period of days to weeks before threshing, to achieve a moisture level low enough for storage. In the 21st century, most grain is produced with the mechanized and powered methods, and is therefore not stooked at all.

== See also ==
- Sheaf
