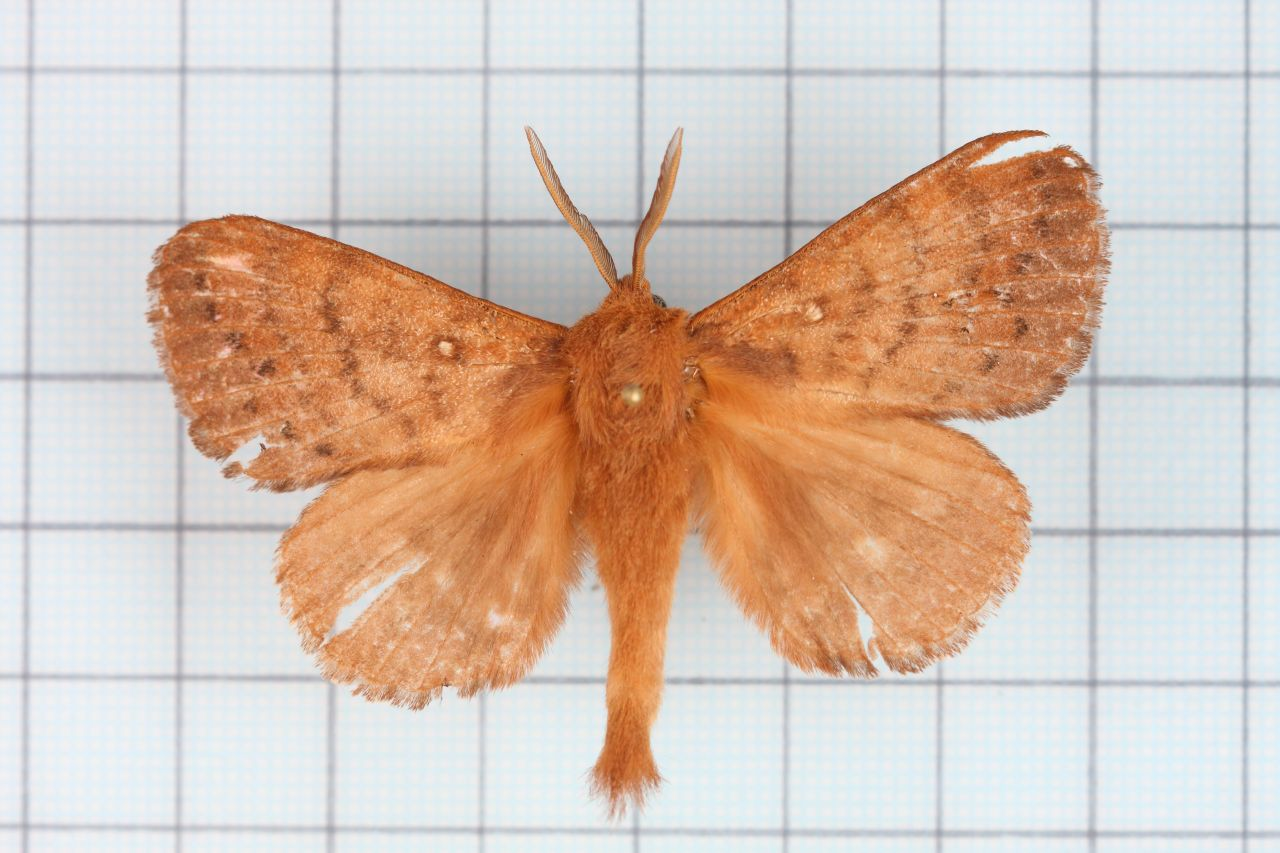

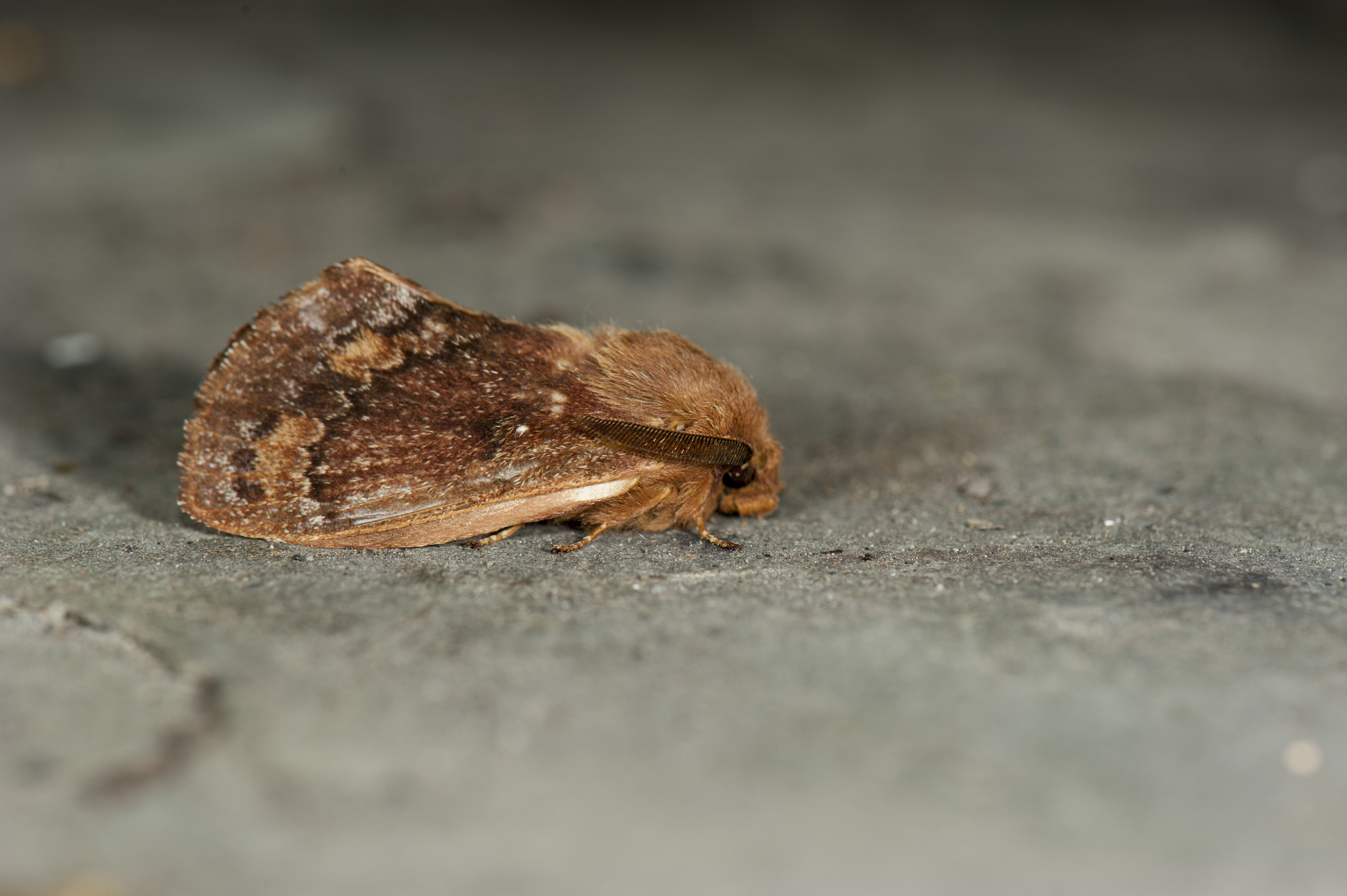

Scientific classification
- Domain: Eukaryota
- Kingdom: Animalia
- Phylum: Arthropoda
- Class: Insecta
- Order: Lepidoptera
- Family: Lasiocampidae
- Genus: Dendrolimus
- Species: D. arizanus

Binomial name
- Dendrolimus arizanus (Wileman, 1910)

Synonyms
- Dendrolimus ariaznus

= Dendrolimus arizanus =

Species of moth

Dendrolimus arizanus is a moth of the family Lasiocampidae. It is found in Taiwan.

The wingspan is 45–57 mm. Adults are on wing in September.
