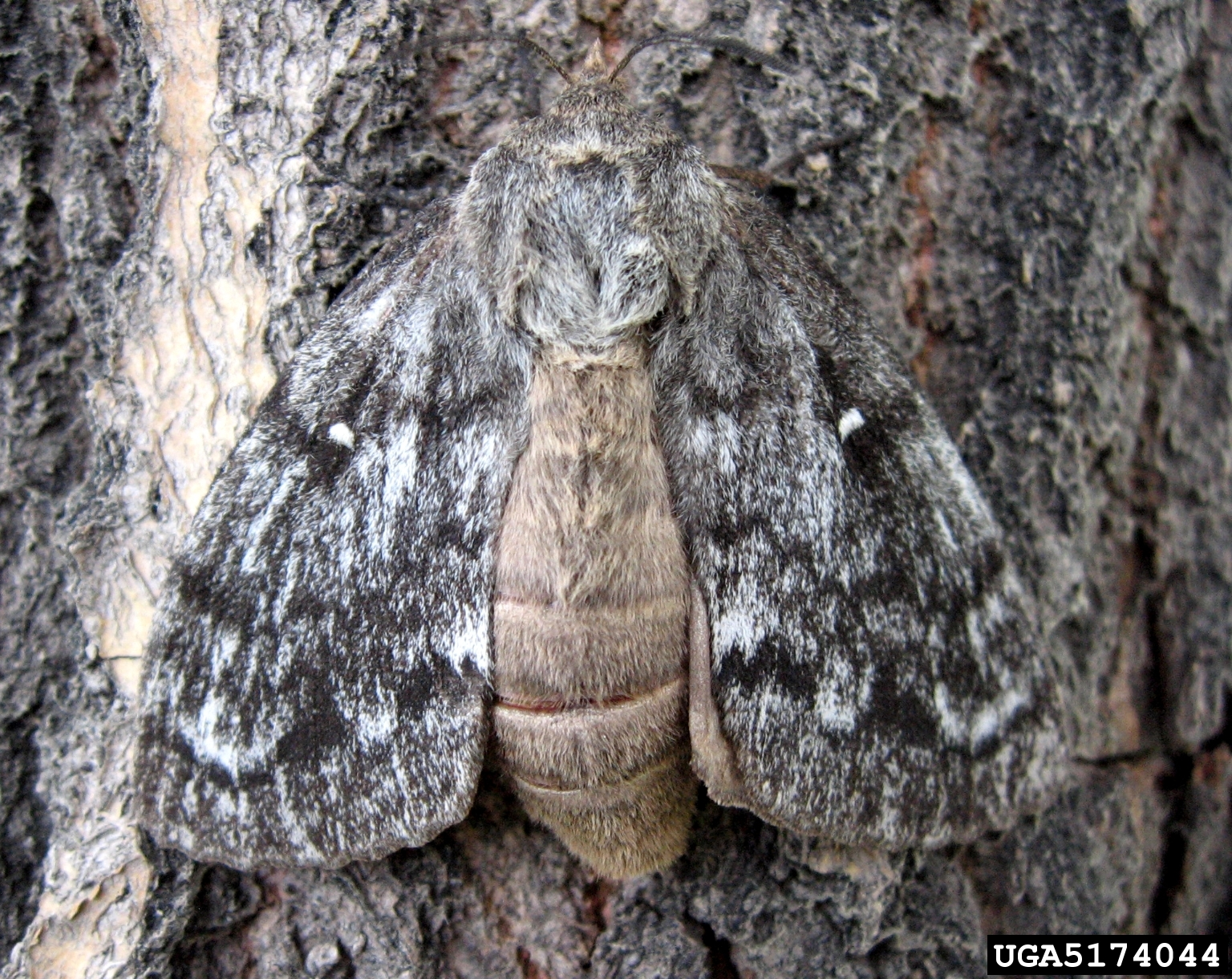

Scientific classification
- Domain: Eukaryota
- Kingdom: Animalia
- Phylum: Arthropoda
- Class: Insecta
- Order: Lepidoptera
- Family: Lasiocampidae
- Genus: Dendrolimus
- Species: D. superans

Binomial name
- Dendrolimus superans (Butler, 1877)

Synonyms
- Odonestis superans Butler, 1877; Dendrolimus sibiricus Tschetverikov, 1908

= Dendrolimus superans =

Species of moth

Dendrolimus superans, also called the white-lined silk moth, Sakhalin silk moth, Japanese hemlock caterpillar, Siberian silk moth, Siberian moth, Siberian conifer silk moth, Siberian lasiocampid or larch caterpillar, is a moth of the family Lasiocampidae.

== Distribution ==
It is found in Kazakhstan, Mongolia, China, Russia, Korea and Japan.

== Description ==
The wingspan is 60–102 mm. The colour ranges from light yellowish brown or light grey to dark brown or almost black. The forewings are crossed by two dark stripes and there is a white spot situated at the centre of the forewing.

== Life cycle ==
The length of the life cycle varies from two to four calendar years. There are cycles of slow build up of population over several years, reaching a peak (outbreak) followed by a population collapse.

== Host plants and damage ==
The larvae feed on Larix, Picea and Pinus species. It is the major defoliator of coniferous forests in Asian Russia.

== Subspecies ==
- Dendrolimus superans superans - white-lined silk moth, Sakhalin silk moth, Japanese hemlock caterpillar (Sakhalin, the Kurile Islands and northern Japan)
- Dendrolimus superans sibiricus Tschetverikov, 1908 - Siberian silk moth, Siberian moth, Siberian conifer silk moth, Siberian lasiocampid or larch caterpillar (north eastern Kazakhstan, Urals, Siberia and the Far East)

== Gallery ==
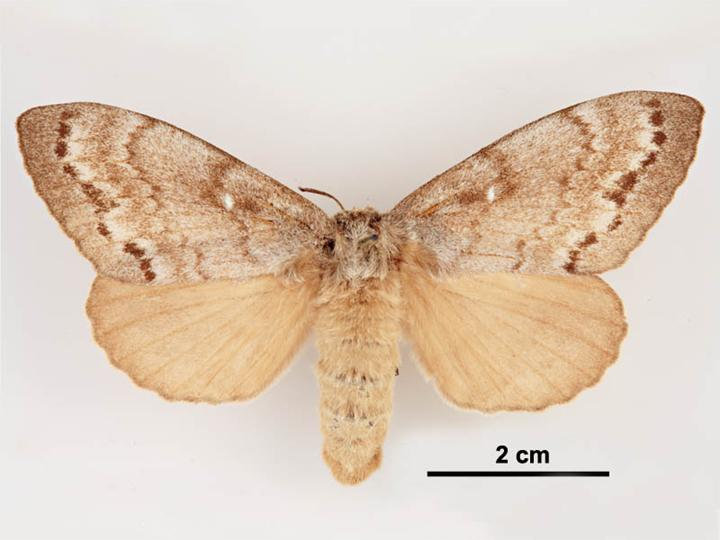
Female, dorsal view

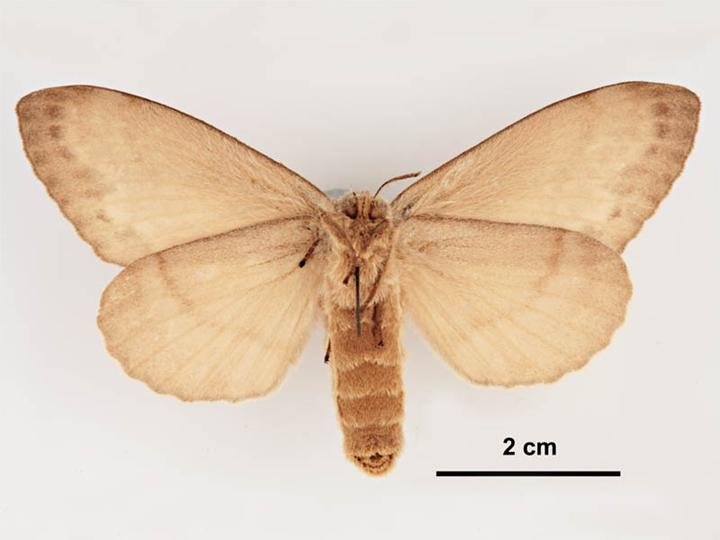
Female, ventral view

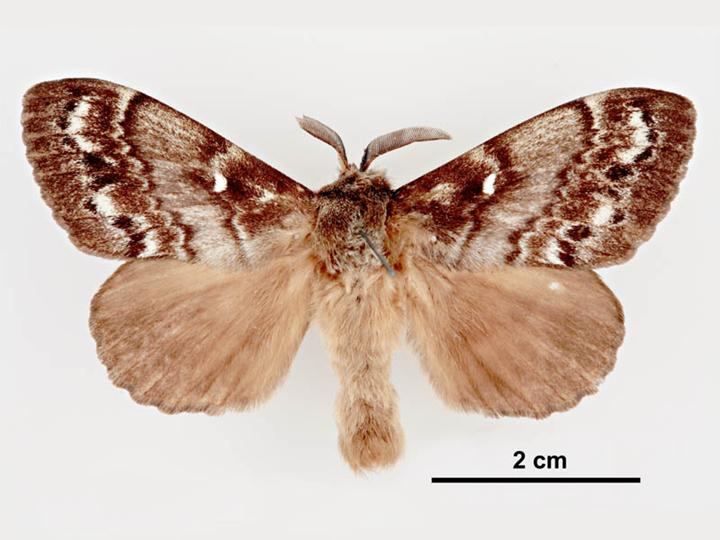
Male, dorsal view

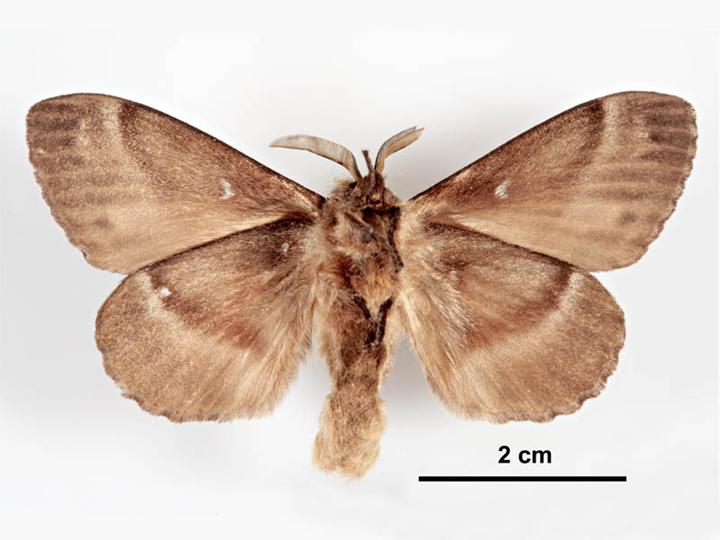
Male, ventral view
