= Drino (fly) =

- Drino gilva

Scientific classification
- Kingdom: Animalia
- Phylum: Arthropoda
- Clade: Pancrustacea
- Class: Insecta
- Order: Diptera
- Family: Tachinidae
- Subfamily: Exoristinae
- Tribe: Eryciini
- Genus: Drino; Robineau-Desvoidy, 1863

Type species
- Drino volucris (= Tachina lota Meigen, 1824) Robineau-Desvoidy, 1863

Synonyms
- Zygosturmia Townsend, 1911; Laximasicera Curran, 1927; Anazygosturmia Townsend, 1927; Sturmiodoria Townsend, 1928; Cubaemyia Townsend, 1931; Gyrovaga Townsend, 1933

Genus of flies

Drino is a genus of flies in the family Tachinidae.

== Taxonomy ==
Subgenus Drino Robineau-Desvoidy, 1863

- Drino adiscalis (Chao, 1982)
- Drino angustifacies (Mesnil, 1949)
- Drino angustivitta Liang & Chao, 1998
- Drino antennalis (Reinhard, 1922)
- Drino argenticeps (Macquart, 1851)
- Drino auripollinis Chao & Liang, 1998
- Drino bakeri (Coquillett, 1897)
- Drino cordata (Curran, 1927)
- Drino cubaecola (Jaennicke, 1867)
- Drino densichaeta Chao & Liang, 1998
- Drino facialis (Townsend, 1928)
- Drino flava Chao & Liang, 1992
- Drino hainanica Liang & Chao, 1998
- Drino hunanensis Chao & Liang, 1993
- Drino imberbis (Wiedemann, 1830)
- Drino inca (Townsend, 1911)
- Drino incompta (Wulp, 1890)
- Drino interfrons (Sun & Chao, 1992)
- Drino laticornis Chao & Liang, 1998
- Drino longicapilla Chao & Liang, 1998
- Drino longihirta Chao & Liang, 1992
- Drino lota (Meigen, 1824)
- Drino maroccana Mesnil, 1951
- Drino minuta Liang & Chao, 1998
- Drino parafacialis Chao & Liang, 1998
- Drino rhoeo (Walker, 1849)
- Drino vicina (Zetterstedt, 1849)

Subgenus Palexorista Townsend, 1921

- Drino aequalis (Malloch, 1935)
- Drino amicula Mesnil, 1949
- Drino ampliceps (Karsch, 1886)
- Drino aureocincta Mesnil, 1977
- Drino aureola Mesnil, 1970
- Drino auricapita Chao & Liang, 1998
- Drino aurifera (Villeneuve, 1943)
- Drino bancrofti (Crosskey, 1967)
- Drino bisetosa (Baranov, 1932)
- Drino bohemica Mesnil, 1949
- Drino crassiseta Mesnil, 1968
- Drino curvipalpis (Wulp, 1893)
- Drino deducens (Walker, 1859)
- Drino disparis (Sabrosky, 1976)
- Drino flavicans (Wiedemann, 1819)
- Drino flaviseta (Thomson, 1869)
- Drino gilva (Hartig, 1838)
- Drino gilvoides (Curran, 1927)
- Drino idonea (Brauer & von Bergenstamm, 1891)
- Drino immersa (Walker, 1859)
- Drino inconspicua (Meigen, 1830)
- Drino inconspicuoides (Baranov, 1932)
- Drino iterata Mesnil, 1949
- Drino laetifica Mesnil, 1950
- Drino latigena (Mesnil, 1944)
- Drino lavinia (Curran, 1927)
- Drino longicornis Chao & Liang, 1992
- Drino longiforceps Chao & Liang, 1998
- Drino lucagus (Walker, 1849)
- Drino macquarti (Crosskey, 1973)
- Drino mayneana (Villeneuve, 1930)
- Drino melancholica Mesnil, 1949
- Drino nova Mesnil, 1949
- Drino obliterata Mesnil, 1949
- Drino painei (Baranov, 1934)
- Drino patruelis Mesnil, 1949
- Drino pulchra (Curran, 1927)
- Drino quadrizonula (Thomson, 1869)
- Drino rufa Zeegers, 2007
- Drino salva (Wiedemann, 1830)
- Drino sinensis Mesnil, 1949
- Drino solennis (Walker, 1858)
- Drino sororcula Mesnil, 1949
- Drino subanajama (Townsend, 1927)
- Drino subaurata (Walker, 1853)
- Drino succini (Giebel, 1862)
- Drino summaria (Townsend, 1927)
- Drino tenella (Bezzi, 1911)
- Drino terrosa Mesnil, 1949
- Drino ugandana (Curran, 1927)
- Drino upoluae (Malloch, 1935)
- Drino wuzhi Liang & Chao, 1998

Subgenus Zygobothria Mik, 1891

- Drino atra Liang & Chao, 1998
- Drino atropivora (Robineau-Desvoidy, 1830)
- Drino ciliata (Wulp, 1881)
- Drino grandicornis Mesnil, 1977
- Drino hirtmacula (Liang & Chao, 1990)
- Drino longiseta Chao & Liang, 1998
- Drino lugens (Mesnil, 1944)
- Drino pollinosa Chao & Liang, 1998
- Drino trifida (Wulp, 1890)
