= Komomaki =

Straw belt wrapped around a tree for pest protection

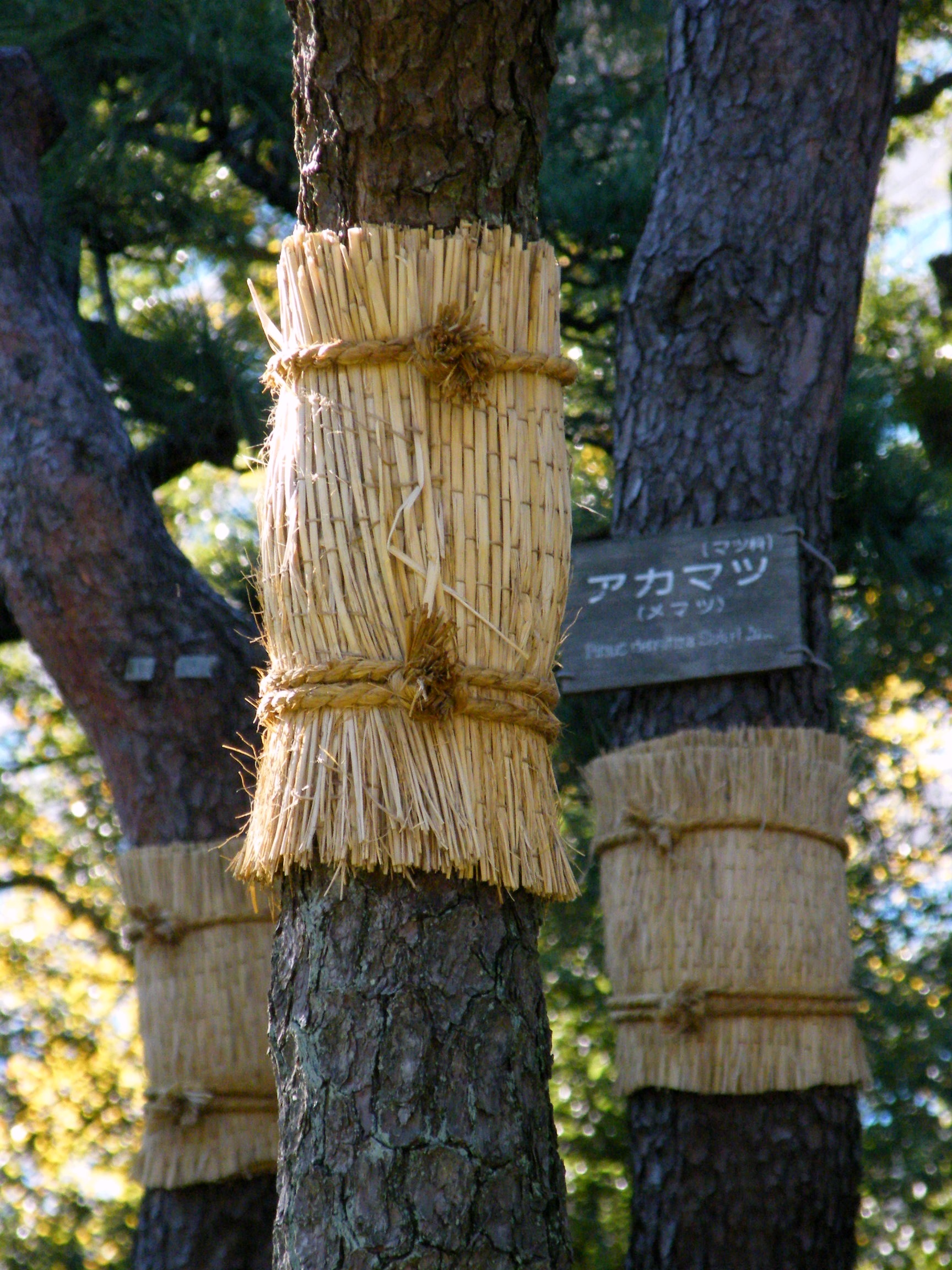
Komomaki in Hibiya Park, Tokyo

Komomaki (菰巻き, komomaki) are straw belts, also known as waramaki, wrapped around trees during winter in Japan to protect them against pests. They are wrapped around pine trees, a custom that dates back to the Edo period.

== History ==
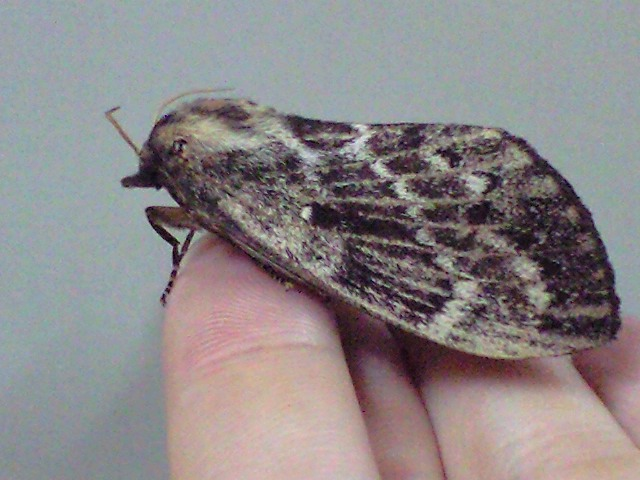
Dendrolimus spectabilis

During the Edo period a gardener developed komomaki as a method of attracting a pest known as the "pine moth" in English. Called matsugahera in Japanese, and Dendrolimus spectabilis scientifically, the moths eat pine needles which can weaken the tree. The komomaki are placed as a warm place for the caterpillars to spend the winter, and they are burned just before spring, before the caterpillars emerge from hibernation. The ashes are used as fertiliser.

== Effectiveness ==
In recent times it has become known that in reality the komomaki catch more insects that are beneficial for the pine trees, and that the number of pine moths caught was relatively low.

A study by Chikako Niiho and others from the Himeji Institute of Technology on the komomaki at Himeji castle discovered that in 2005 only six of the 1,577 insects caught that year (0.3%) were pine moths.

== Currently ==
The Tokyo Imperial Palace and the Kyoto Imperial Palace no longer use komomaki, but they can be seen in nine traditional gardens in Tokyo as a seasonal marker (風物詩, fūbutsushi). They can also be seen on the pine trees in the KEK research organisation in Tsukuba, Ibaraki prefecture.
