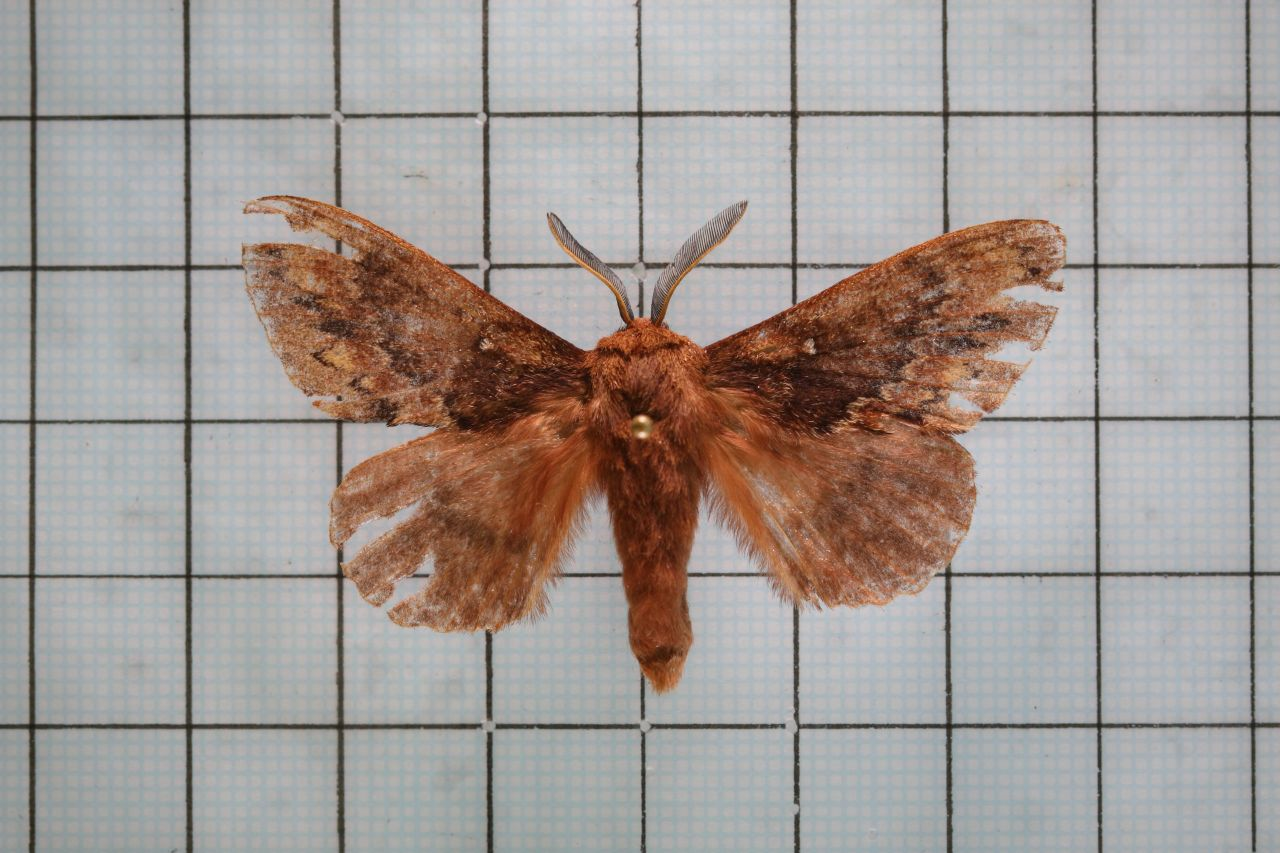

Scientific classification
- Kingdom: Animalia
- Phylum: Arthropoda
- Class: Insecta
- Order: Lepidoptera
- Family: Lasiocampidae
- Genus: Karenkonia; Matsumura, 1932
- Species: K. taiwana

Binomial name
- Karenkonia taiwana Matsumura, 1932

Synonyms
- Dendrolimus taiwanus (Matsumura, 1932); Dendrolimus taiwana Matsumura, 1932

= Karenkonia =

Genus of moths

Karenkonia is a monotypic moth genus in the family Lasiocampidae first described by Shōnen Matsumura in 1932. Its single species, Karenkonia taiwana, described by the same author in the same year, is found in Taiwan.
