= Sheaf (agriculture) =

Bundle of cereal-crop stems bound together after reaping

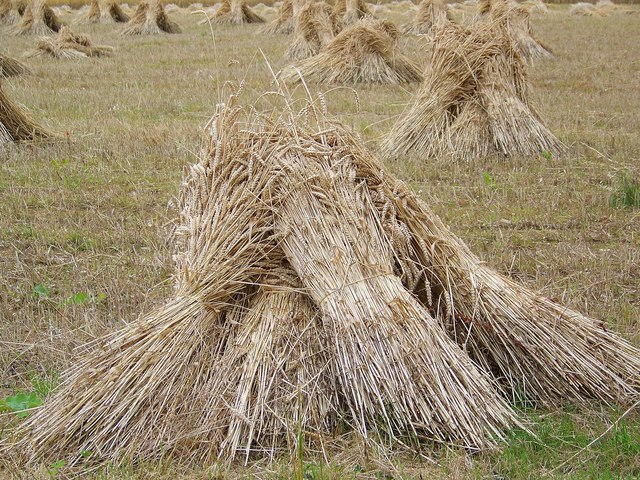
Wheat sheaves near King's Somborne; the individual sheaves have been put together into a stook ("stooked") to dry.

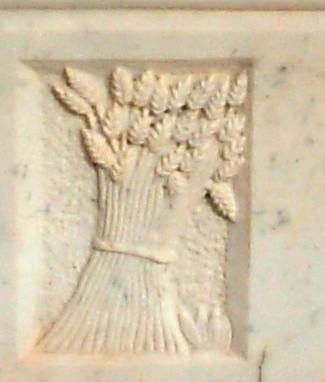
A sheaf of grain on a plaque

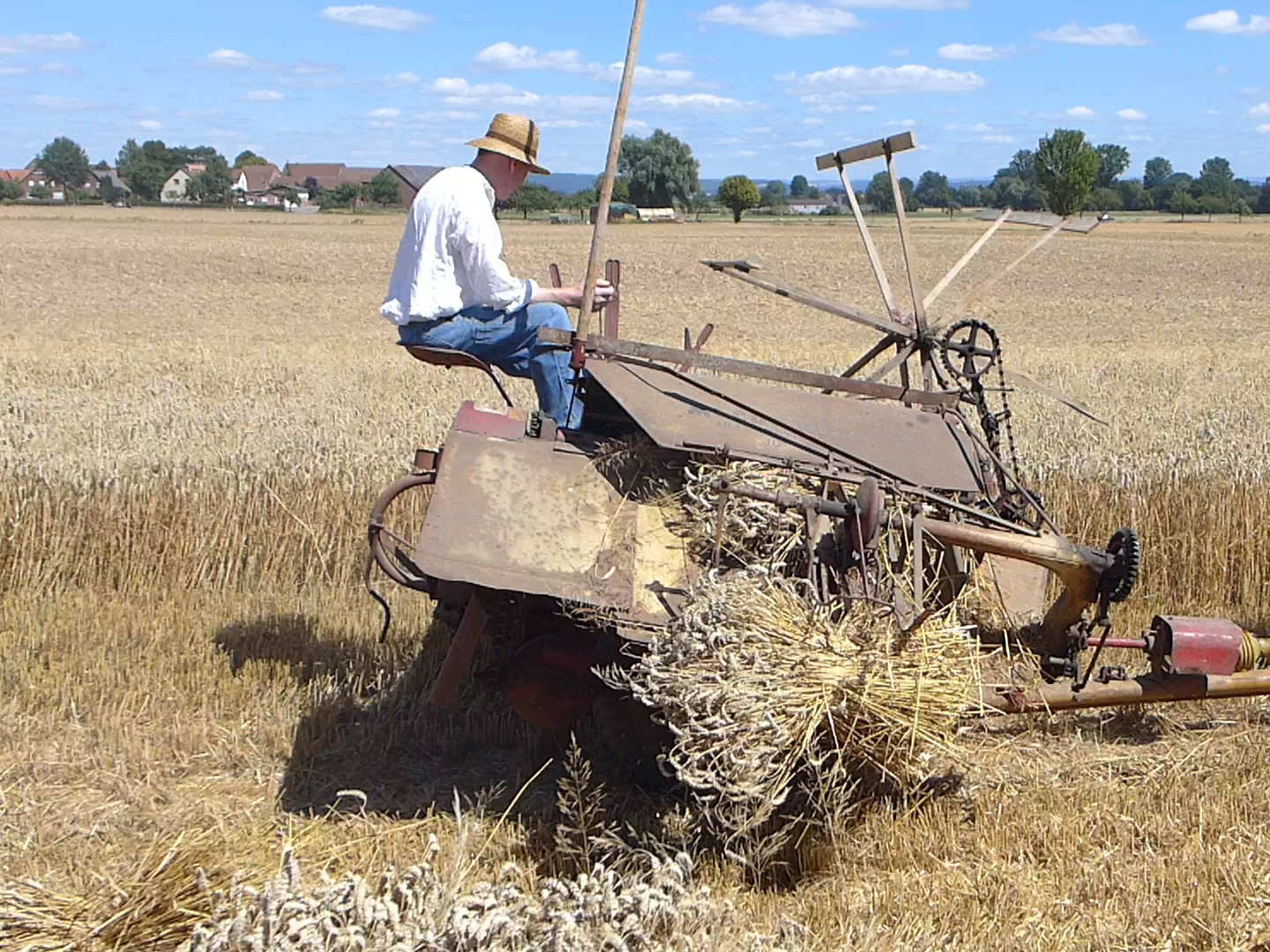
Sheafing machine

A sheaf (/ʃiːf/; pl.: sheaves) is a bunch of cereal-crop stems bound together after reaping, traditionally by sickle, later by scythe or, after its introduction in 1872, by a mechanical reaper-binder.

== History ==
Traditional hand-reapers, using scythes and working as a team, cut a field of grain clockwise, starting from an outside edge and finishing in the middle. Scything leaves a windrow of cut stems to the left of the reaper and, if cut skillfully, leaves the seed heads more or less aligned. These are then picked up and tied into sheaves by the sheavers, who traditionally use other cut stems as ties. These sheavers, or a following team, then stand the sheaves up in stooks to dry. Three to eight sheaves make up each stook, which forms a self-supporting A-frame with the grain-heads meeting at the top. This keeps the grain well ventilated, and off the ground, allowing it to dry and discouraging vermin.

The drying sheaves are later either placed by hand or pitched onto a cart. The traditional sheaf pitchfork has a long wooden handle, two short tynes and a rounded back to make the placing of sheaves easy. The gathered sheaves are then either built into stacks (thatched stacks could be over 20' high) or taken to a barn for further drying before being threshed to separate the grain from the stems.

== Today ==
The mechanisation of agriculture in industrialised countries, in particular the introduction of the combine harvester from the middle of the 19th century, has made the sheaf redundant, but sheaves remain in widespread use wherever harvesting is still done by hand or by reaper-binder.

== Heraldry ==
A sheaf in the coat of arms of Lumparland

In heraldry a wheat sheaf is called a garb, a term cognate with grab, grub, grave and German Gerbe.

== See also ==
- Omer (unit), a Biblical measure of volume of grain.
