= Mower (disambiguation) =

A mower is a machine designed to cut grass or crops or other plants growing close to the ground.

Mower or The Mower may also refer to:

== Equipment ==
- Flail mower
- Lawn mower, a small mower
- Roller mower
- Rotary mower, a mower with a horizontally spinning blade

== Art and entertainment ==
- Mower (band), an American hardcore/punk jazz band or their self-titled 2003 debut album
- "The Mower", a 1979 poem by Philip Larkin
- "The Mower" (folk song), folk song listed as item 833 in the Roud Folk Song Index
- "The Mower's Song", a 1681 poem by Andrew Marvell
- Harvest Time (Mowers), a painting by Grigoriy Myasoedov
- "The Mower", a 1970 poem by William Heyen
- "The Mower", painting by Georges Seurat

== People ==
- Andrew Mower (born 1975), Scottish-Australian rugby union player
- Barry Mower, American businessperson
- Caryn Mower (born 1965), American professional wrestler actress, and stuntwoman
- Charles Mower (1875–1942), American yacht designer and author
- Eric Mower (born 1944), American marketing executive
- Jack Mower (1890–1965), American film actor
- John Edward Mower (1815–1879), member of Minnesota territorial legislature
- Joseph A. Mower (1827–1870), Union general during the American Civil War
- Liam Mower (born 1992), English actor and dancer
- Morton Mower (born 1933), American cardiologist and the co-inventor of the automatic implantable cardioverter defibrillator
- Patrick Mower (born 1938), English actor

== Places ==
- Mower, New Jersey, U.S.
- Mower County, Minnesota, U.S.

== Other ==
- Mower (company), American marketing agency, originally named the Eric Mower and Associates
- 23833 Mowers, a main belt asteroid
- Mower General Hospital, a U.S. Army Federal military hospital during the American Civil War
- USAT Sgt. Charles E. Mower, originally named the USS Tryon (APH-1)

== See also ==
- Moa, nine species of extinct flightless birds
- Mowers (surname)
