= Trimax Mowing Systems =

New Zealand turf maintenance manufacturer

- Type: Private
- Industry: Turf maintenance
- Founded: 1981
- Headquarters: Tauranga, New Zealand
- Key people: Bob Sievwright, Founder and CEO
- Products: Professional turf maintenance equipment
- Website: www.trimaxmowers.com

Trimax Mowing Systems is a New Zealand-based manufacturer of commercial rotary and roller mowers. The company was founded in 1981 and produces equipment used in turf maintenance across sectors including sports fields, airports, and public green spaces. Trimax distributes its products internationally, with operations in New Zealand, Australia, the United Kingdom, and the United States.

== History ==
The company was founded by the former GM Production Engineer Bob Sievwright. After he graduated General Motors Institute in Flint, Michigan he designed, manufactured, and sold special flails for flail mowers and eventually started his own mowing company. The first mowers he produced were flail mowers and flail mulchers for kiwifruit cultivation. Sievwright’s brand was soon recognised for its high quality of cut and strong build roller mower.

In 1981 the company, then named Trimax Industries Ltd, began the production of its first flail mowers - Ezeemow, Mowcraft and Mulchmasta. In 1985, the company started its own dedicated research and development department and exported its first products to Australia.

Trimax was awarded "Best Engineering" in 1991 and, following the start of exports to the United Kingdom in 1992, Trimax was named "Exporter of the Year" in 1993 by the BNZ Bay of Plenty Export Awards.

In 1995 Trimax began exporting to the United States and, to support these exports, Sievwright started the company "Base3USA". This company is based in Griffin, Georgia, near Atlanta, and provides warehouses, logistics, and fulfillment for other importers.

In 1997 Windsor Castle and the surrounding Windsor Great Park in the UK began using Trimax ProCut mowers for their maintenance. Further adoption by high profile customers led to the company opening its first UK office and warehouse in Little Addington, Northamptonshire in 1998, to supply local dealers. Following this success in the UK, in 2005 Trimax also opened its own distribution warehouse in Griffin, Georgia, USA.

In 2008 Trimax’s Pegasus S3 mower was awarded bronze at the 2008 New Zealand Best Design Awards. Two years later the Trimax Merlin mower, the predecessor of Snake, was awarded silver at the 2010 New Zealand Best Design Awards. In 2010 the company won the Bay of Plenty Export Awards for the second time and is regarded as the most prominent company of the region.

In early 2012 Trimax began manufacturing products in the UK. The company now builds its Striker, Procut, Snake, Pegasus and Flaildek at its UK facility in Northampton, Northamptonshire.

In addition, Trimax also manufactures at its headquarters in New Zealand and the United States. It has corporate offices in Australia and exports their products to South Africa, France, Sweden, Norway, Denmark, the Netherlands and Germany.

Notable grounds maintained with Trimax Mowers include:

- Guards Polo Club uses Trimax Stealth S2 and the new Trimax Snake Mowers in their maintenance.
- Old Course at St Andrews uses Trimax Merlin mowers for its fairways and rough.
- The Waikato Stadium in Hamilton, New Zealand, uses Trimax ProCut S3 for their grass maintenance. The Stadium hosts the Chiefs, a Super Rugby team.
- Raglan Parc Golf Club at the Raglan Castle uses Trimax Snake mower for its semi-rough.
- Silverstone Circuit has used Trimax Stealth mowers since 1999 for the turf around the track.
- Atlanta Motor Speedway has used Trimax Pegasus mowers since 2009 for the infield.

== Products ==
All Trimax roller mowers are tractor powered and have either flail or rotary blade systems.
