= Hedge cutter =

Hedge cutter may refer to:

- a person cutting a hedge
- a tool or machine used for cutting hedges (the term is used rather imprecisely)
  - a hedge trimmer (also called hedge clippers, hedge shears, shrub trimmer, or bush trimmer), a stand-alone manual or powered garden tool, or (rarely) a tractor-mounted machine
  - a reach flail mower (also called flail mulcher, or flail shredder), a tractor-driven implement (when attached to a boom and actually used for cutting hedges)
