= Reaper =

Harvesting machine

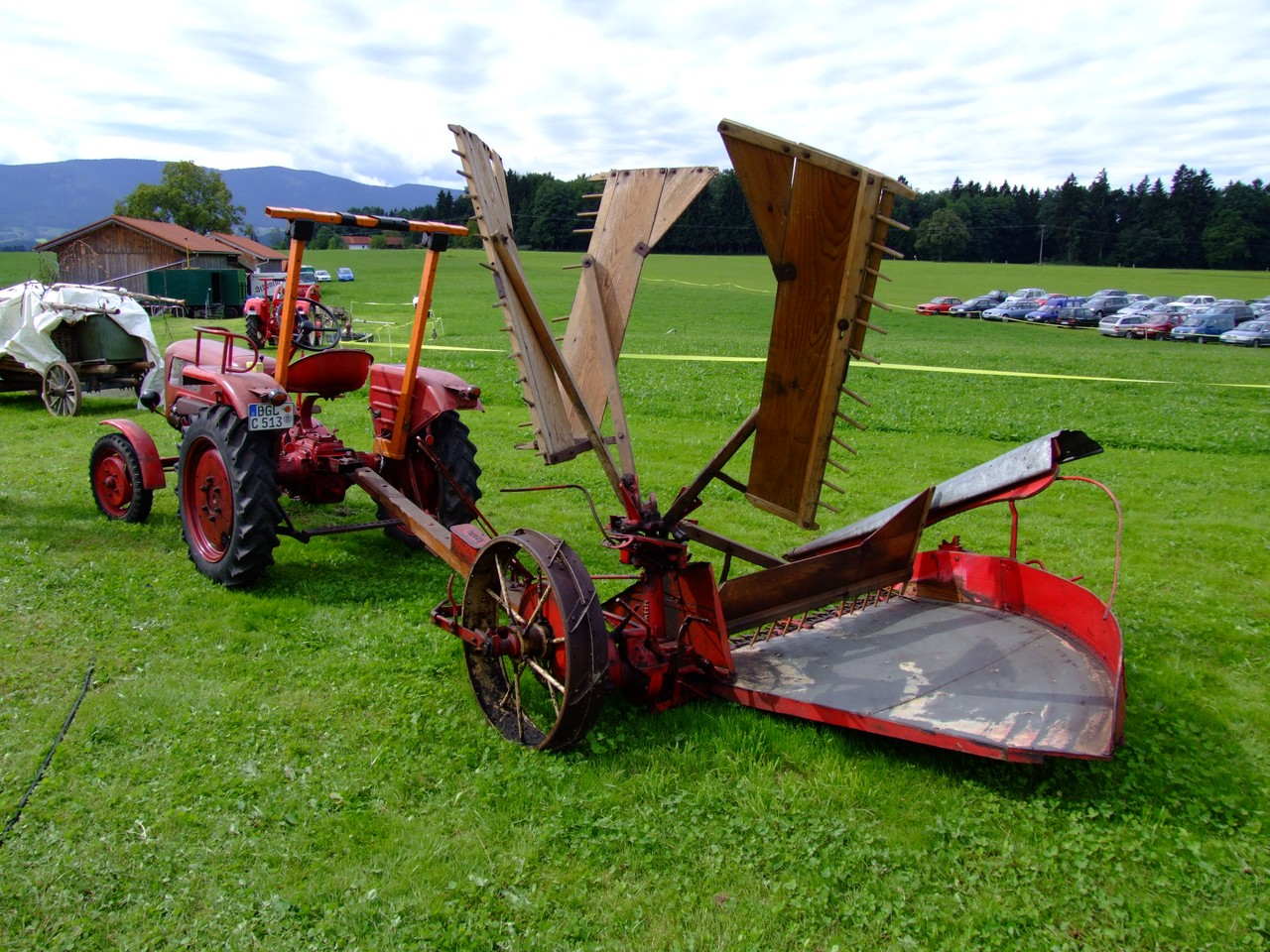
Typical 20th-century reaper, a tractor-drawn Fahr machine

A reaper is a farm implement that reaps (cuts and often also gathers) crops at harvest when they are ripe. Usually the crop involved is a cereal grass, especially wheat. The first documented reaping machines were Gallic reapers that were used in Roman times in what would become modern-day France. The Gallic reaper involved a comb which collected the heads, with an operator knocking the grain into a box for later threshing.

Most modern mechanical reapers cut grass; most also gather it, either by windrowing or picking it up. Modern machines that not only cut and gather the grass but also thresh its seeds (the grain), winnow the grain, and deliver it to a truck or wagon, are called combine harvesters or simply combines, and are the engineering descendants of earlier reapers.

Hay is harvested somewhat differently from grain; in modern haymaking, the machine that cuts the grass is called a hay mower or, if integrated with a conditioner, a mower-conditioner. As a manual task, cutting of both grain and hay may be called reaping, involving scythes, sickles, and cradles, followed by differing downstream steps. Traditionally all such cutting could be called reaping, although a distinction between reaping of grain grasses and mowing of hay grasses has long existed; it was only after a decade of attempts at combined grain reaper/hay mower machines (1830s to 1840s) that designers of mechanical implements began resigning them to separate classes.

Mechanical reapers substantially changed agriculture from their appearance in the 1830s until the 1860s through 1880s, when they evolved into related machines, often called by different names (self-raking reaper, harvester, reaper-binder, grain binder, binder), that collected and bound the sheaves of grain with wire or twine.

== Hand reaping ==
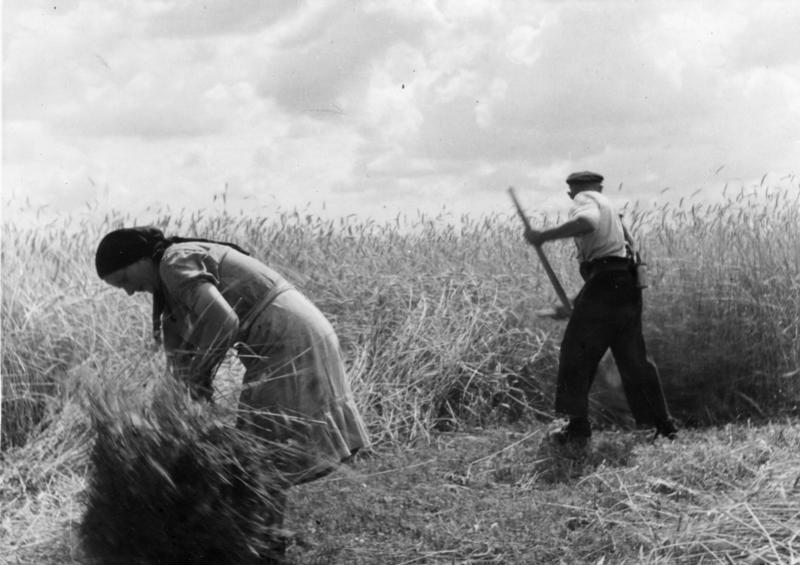
A reaper cutting rye in Germany in 1949

Reaping is usually distinguished from mowing, which uses similar implements, but is the traditional term for cutting grass for hay, rather than reaping cereals. The stiffer, dryer straw of the cereal plants and the greener grasses for hay usually demand different blades on the machines.

The reaped grain stalks are gathered into sheaves (bunches), tied with string or with a twist of straw. Several sheaves are then leant against each other with the ears off the ground to dry out, forming a stook. After drying, the sheaves are gathered from the field and stacked, being placed with the ears inwards, then covered with thatch or a tarpaulin; this is called a stack or rick. In the British Isles a rick of sheaves is traditionally called a corn rick, to distinguish it from a hay rick ("corn" in British English retains its older sense of "grain" generally, not "maize"). Ricks are made in an area inaccessible to livestock, called a rick-yard or stack-yard. The corn-rick is later broken down and the sheaves threshed to separate the grain from the straw. Collecting spilt grain from the field after reaping is called gleaning, and is traditionally done either by hand, or by penning animals such as chickens or pigs onto the field.

Hand reaping is now rarely done in industrialized countries, but is still the normal method where machines are unavailable or where access for them is limited (such as on narrow terraces).

== Mechanical reaping ==
A mechanical reaper or reaping machine is a mechanical, semi-automated device that harvests crops. Mechanical reapers and their descendant machines have been an important part of mechanized agriculture and a main feature of agricultural productivity. Patrick Bell invented a reaper in Scotland in 1828.

=== Mechanical reapers in the U.S. ===
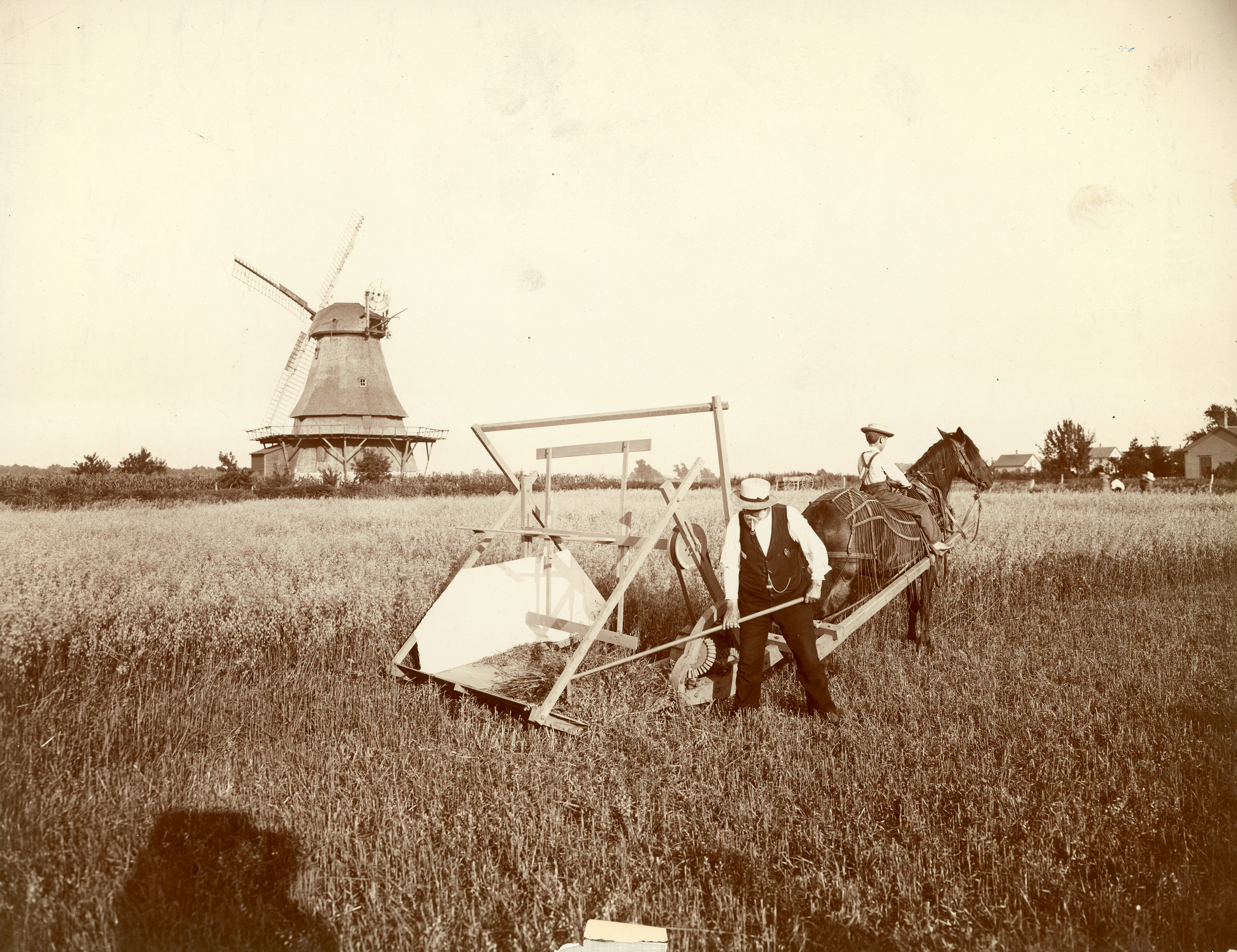
McCormick's reaper. For a 20 minute film that gives the reaper story see online at YouTube

The 19th century saw several inventors in the United States claim innovation in mechanical reapers. The various designs competed with each other, and were the subject of several lawsuits.

Obed Hussey in Ohio patented a reaper in 1833, the Hussey Reaper. Made in Baltimore, Maryland, Hussey's design was a major improvement in reaping efficiency. The new reaper only required two horses working in a non-strenuous manner, a man to work the machine, and another person to drive. In addition, the Hussey Reaper left an even and clean surface after its use.

The McCormick Reaper was designed by Robert McCormick in Walnut Grove, Virginia. However, Robert became frustrated when he was unable to perfect his new device. His son Cyrus asked for permission to try to complete his father's project. With permission granted, the McCormick Reaper was patented by his son Cyrus McCormick in 1834 as a horse-drawn farm implement to cut small grain crops. This McCormick reaper machine had several special elements:

- a main wheel frame
- projected to the side a platform containing a cutter bar having fingers through which reciprocated a knife driven by a crank
- upon the outer end of the platform was a divider projecting ahead of the platform to separate the grain to be cut from that to be left standing
- a reel was positioned above the platform to hold the grain against the reciprocating knife to throw it back upon the platform
- the machine was drawn by a team walking at the side of the grain.

Cyrus McCormick claimed that his reaper was actually invented in 1831, giving him the true claim to the general design of the machine. Over the next few decades the Hussey and McCormick reapers would compete with each other in the marketplace, despite being quite similar. By the 1850s, the original patents of both Hussey and McCormick had expired and many other manufacturers put similar machines on the market.

In 1861, the United States Patent and Trademark Office issued a ruling on the invention of the polarizing reaper design. It was determined that the money made from reapers was in large part due to Obed Hussey. S. T. Shubert, the acting commissioner of patents, declared that Hussey's improvements were the foundation of their success. It was ruled that the heirs of Obed Hussey would be monetarily compensated for his hard work and innovation by those who had made money from the reaper. It was also ruled that McCormick's reaper patent would be renewed for another seven years.

Although the McCormick reaper was a revolutionary innovation for the harvesting of crops, it did not experience mainstream success and acceptance until at least 20 years after it was patented by Cyrus McCormick. This was because the McCormick reaper lacked a quality unique to Obed Hussey's reaper. Hussey's reaper used a sawlike cutter bar that cut stalks far more effectively than McCormick's. Only once Cyrus McCormick was able to acquire the rights to Hussey's cutter-bar mechanism (around 1850) did a truly revolutionary machine emerge. Other factors in the gradual uptake of mechanized reaping included natural cultural conservatism among farmers (proven tradition versus new and unknown machinery); the poor state of many new farm fields, which were often littered with rocks, stumps, and areas of uneven soil, making the lifespan and operability of a reaping machine questionable; and some amount of fearful Luddism among farmers that the machine would take away jobs, most especially among hired manual labourers.

Another strong competitor in the industry was the Manny Reaper by John Henry Manny and the companies that succeeded him. Even though McCormick has sometimes been simplistically credited as the [sole] "inventor" of the mechanical reaper, a more accurate statement is that he independently reinvented aspects of it, created a crucial original integration of enough aspects to make a successful whole, and benefited from the influence of more than two decades of work by his father, as well as the aid of Jo Anderson, a slave held by his family.

=== Reapers in the late 19th and 20th century ===
After the first reapers were developed and patented, other slightly different reapers were distributed by several manufacturers throughout the world. The Champion (Combined) Reapers and Mowers, produced by the Champion Interest]group (Champion Machine Company, later Warder, Bushnell & Glessner, absorbed in IHC 1902) in Springfield, Ohio in the second half of the 19th century, were highly successful in the 1880s in the United States. Springfield is still known as "The Champion City".

Generally, reapers developed into the 1872 invented reaper-binder, which reaped the crop and bound it into sheaves. By 1896, 400,000 reaper-binders were estimated to be harvesting grain. This was in turn replaced by the swather and eventually the combine harvester, which reaps and threshes in one operation.

In Central European agriculture reapers were – together with reaper-binders – common machines until the mid-20th century.

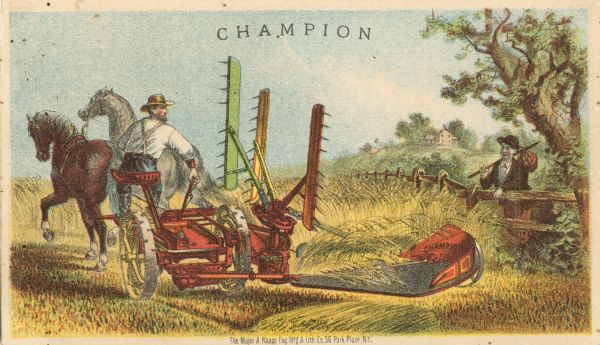
Champion reaper, trade card from 1875

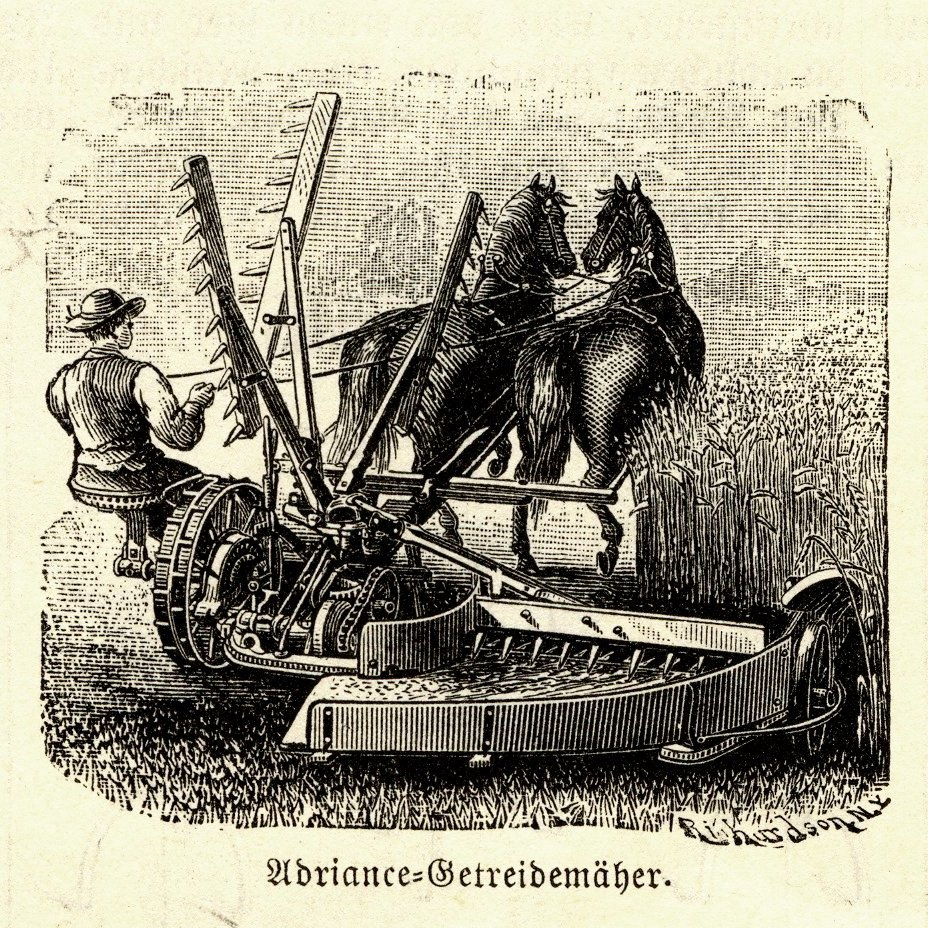
Adriance reaper, late 19th century

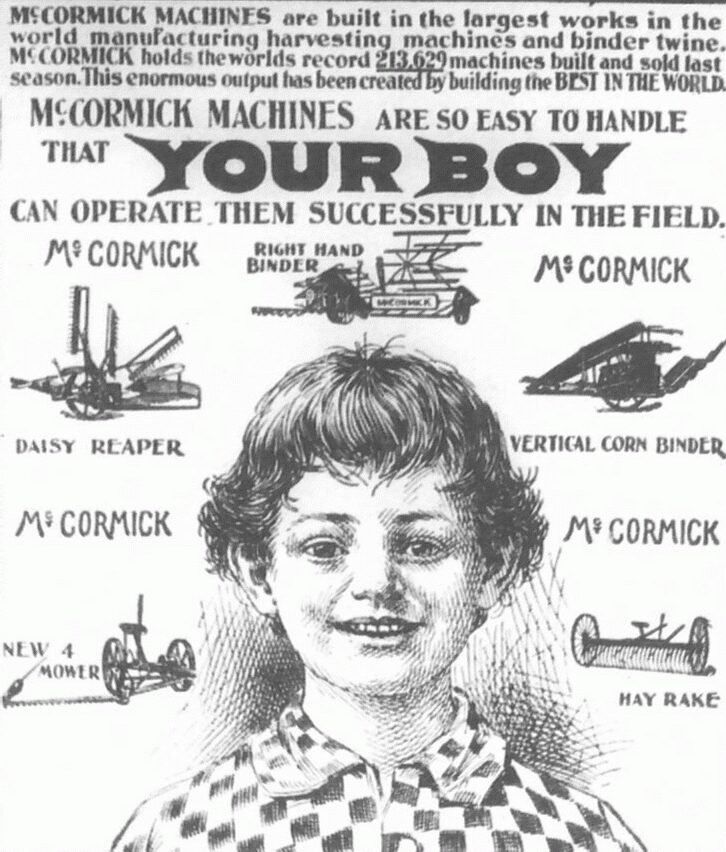
1900 ad for McCormick farm machines—"Your boy can operate them"

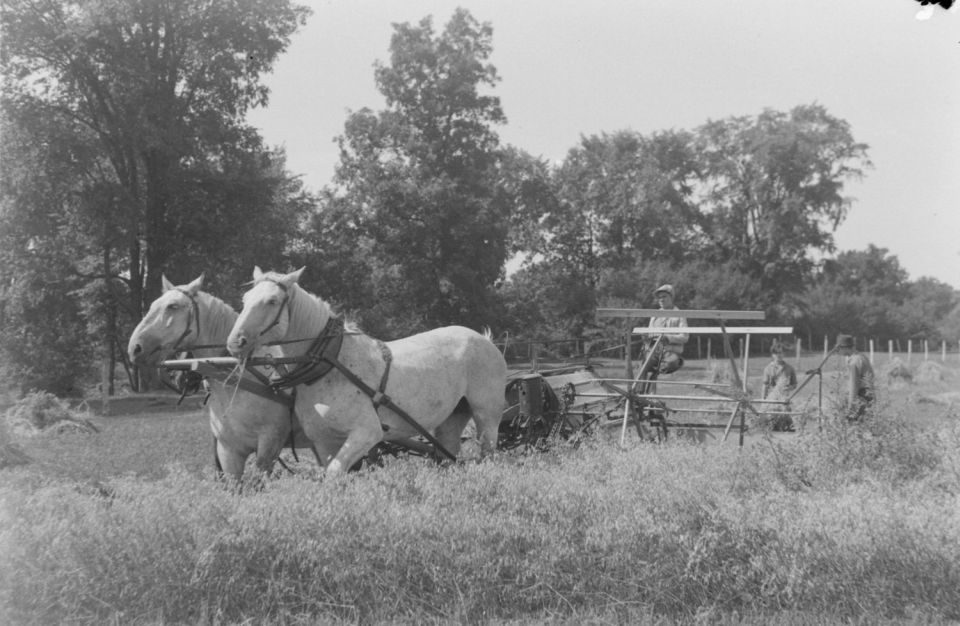
Horse-drawn reaper in Canada in 1941

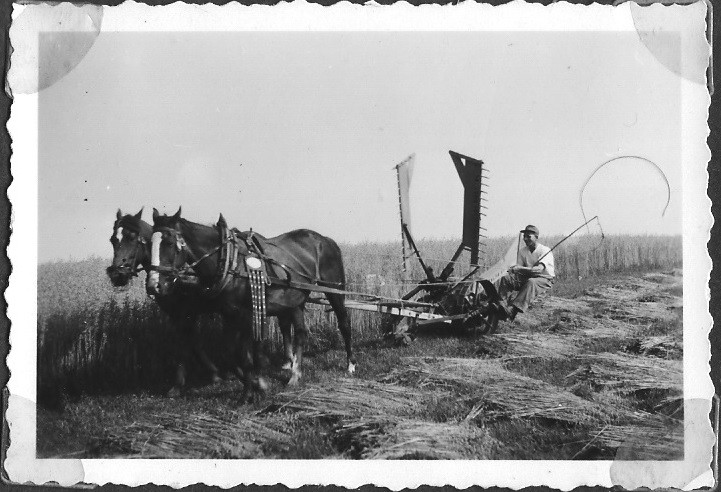
McCormick self-rake-reaper in use in Thuringia (Germany) 1950

== External links: film ==
- " International Harvester presents The Romance of the Reaper" (25 minute B&W sound film, 1937) online; invention & evolution from 1831 to the 1930s.
