= Reaper-binder =

Harvesting machine

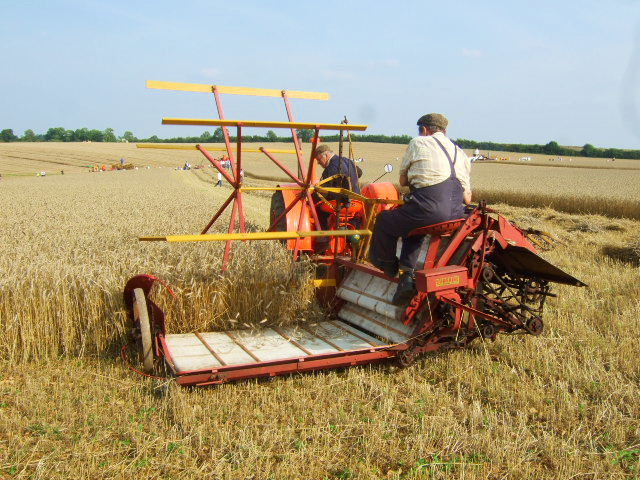
A Massey-Harris reaper-binder pulled by a tractor (Rutland, England, 2008)

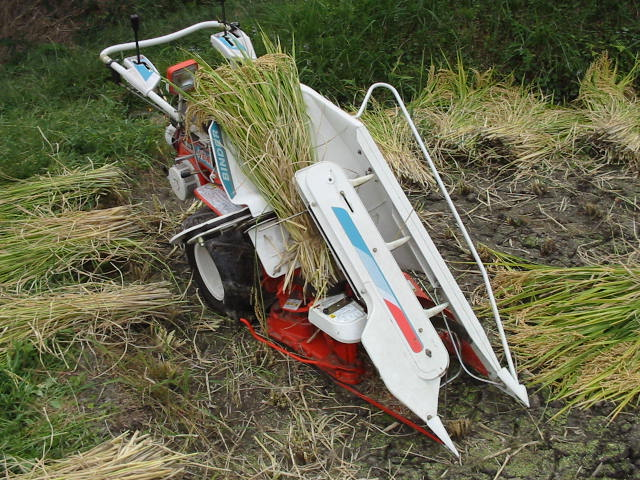
A modern compact binder for rice (2006)

The reaper-binder, or binder, is a farm implement that improved upon the simple reaper. The binder was invented in 1872 by Charles Baxter Withington, a jeweler from Janesville, Wisconsin. In addition to cutting the small-grain crop, a binder also 'binds' the stems into bundles or sheaves. These sheaves are usually then 'shocked' into A-shaped conical stooks, resembling small tipis, to allow the grain to dry for several days before being picked up and threshed.

Withington's original binder used wire to tie the bundles. There were problems with using wire and it was not long before William Deering pioneered a binder that successfully used twine and a knotter (invented in 1858 by John Appleby).

Early binders were horse-drawn, their cutting and tying-mechanisms powered by a bull-wheel, that through the traction of being pulled forward creates rotational forces to operate the mechanical components of the machine. Later models were tractor-drawn and some were tractor-powered. (This mechanical power transfer is commonly referred to as a PTO or power take-off device.) Binders have a reel and a sickle bar, like a modern grain head for a combine harvester. The cut stems fall onto a canvas bed which conveys the cut stems to the binding mechanism. This mechanism bundles the stems of grain and ties the bundle with string to form a sheaf. Once tied, the sheaf is discharged from the side of the binder, to be picked up by the 'stookers'.

With the replacement of the threshing machine by the combine harvester, the binder has become almost obsolete. Some grain crops such as oats are now cut and formed into windrows with a swather. With other grain crops, such as wheat, the grain is now mostly cut and threshed by a combine in a single operation, but the much lighter binder is still in use in small fields or mountain areas too steep or inaccessible for heavy combines.

Reaper-binders were in wide use in the People's Republic of Poland, but farmers often could not operate them due to shortages of twine and a lack of replacement parts. This was such a regular occurrence that baling twine (Polish: sznurek do snopowiązałki) remains a symbol of the dysfunction of the communist economy in the cultural memory of Poland.
