= Bush hog =

Bush hog may refer to:

- Bush Hog, a popular brand of brush hog
- Bushpig, an animal
