= Swath =

Swath or Swathe may refer to:

- Swathe, the strip of mown crop left behind the mower
  - A windrow (synonym), a line or row of cut crop – usually of hay, or straw – left on a field after mowing/reaping/harvesting, or formed afterwards
  - Swath width, the strip of the Earth's surface from which geographic data are collected by a moving vehicle
- SWATH-MS (Sequential Windowed Acquisition of All Theoretical Fragment Ion Mass Spectra), an acquisition type in mass spectrometry
- Small-waterplane-area twin hull (SWATH), a type of ship design
- Snow White and the Huntsman, a dark fantasy action-adventure film based on the German fairy tale by the Brothers Grimm
