= Hedge trimmer =

Gardening tool

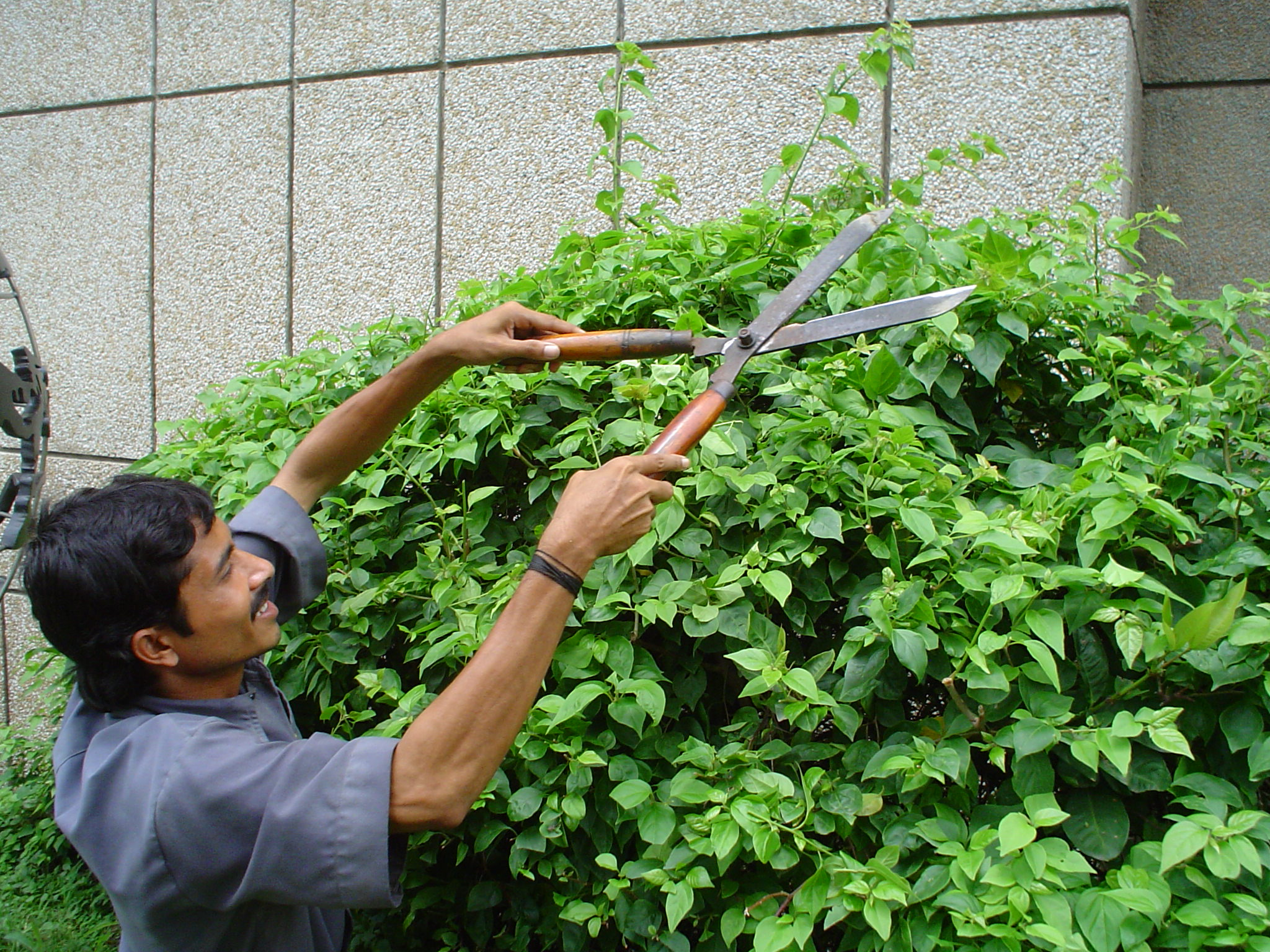
Manual hedge trimming

A hedge trimmer, shrub trimmer, or bush trimmer is a gardening tool or machine used for trimming (cutting, pruning) hedges or solitary shrubs (bushes). Different designs as well as manual and powered versions of hedge trimmers exist. Hedge trimmers vary between small hand-held devices to larger trimmers mounted on tractors.

== Types ==
=== Stand-alone hedge trimmers ===
The power source of stand-alone hedge trimmers can be human power, gasoline, or electricity.

- Manual hedge trimmers (sometimes also called hedge shears or hedge clippers) are designed as large scissors or large pruning shears. They do not need anything to operate and are cheapest/most environmentally friendly.
- Motorized hedge trimmers allow work to be done faster and with less effort than manual ones. Their cutting mechanism is similar to that of finger-bar mowers. Powered trimmers are generally designed with safety devices such that they work only when both of the operator's hands are on the handles.
  - Gasoline-powered trimmers tend to be more powerful but can be heavier and more difficult to start.
  - Electrical trimmers tend to be lighter and less powerful (than gasoline variants) as well as less polluting/noisy, yet still require an electrical cord with most types (if not equipped with rechargeable batteries).
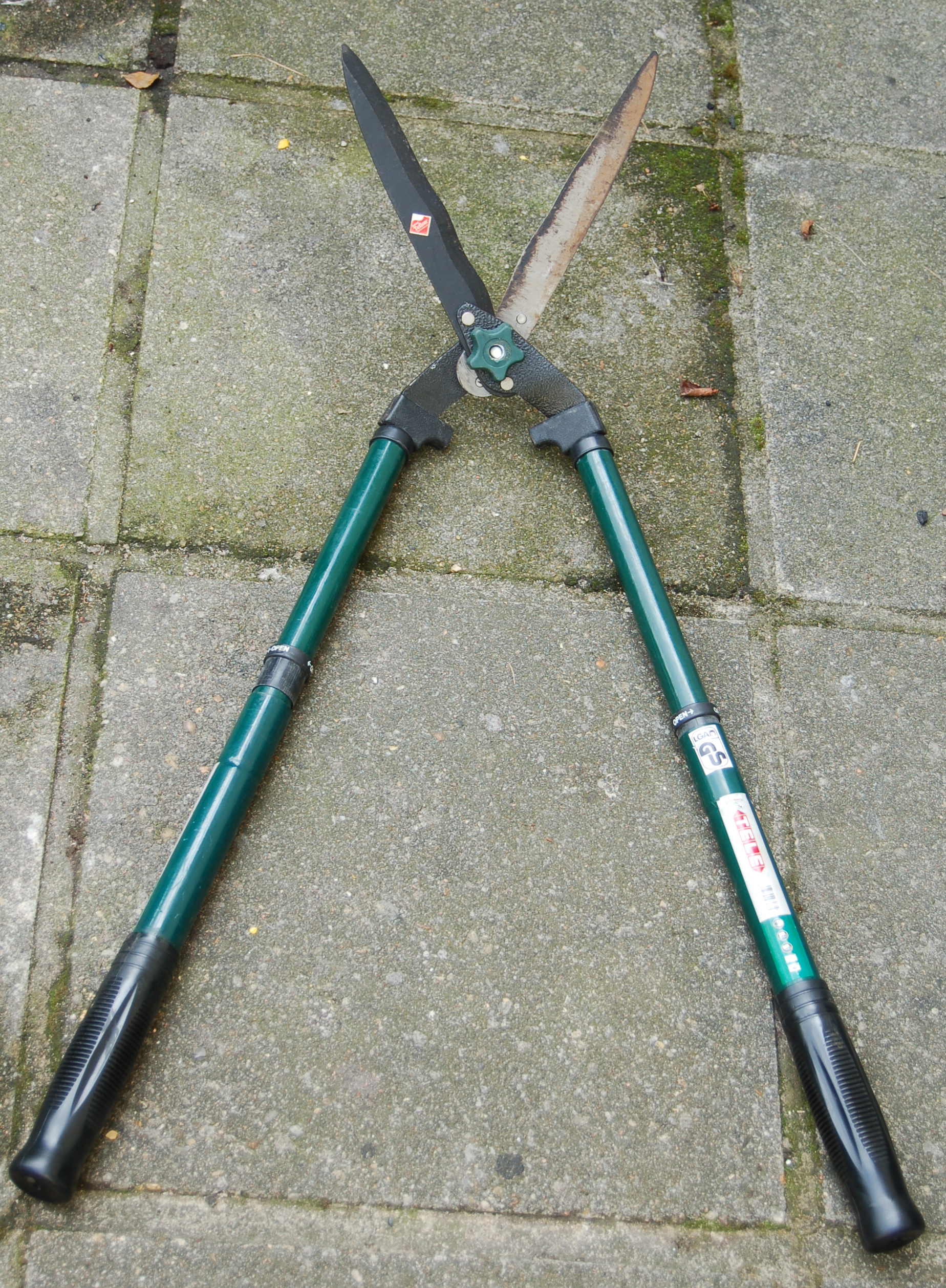
A manual hedge trimmer with telescopic handles

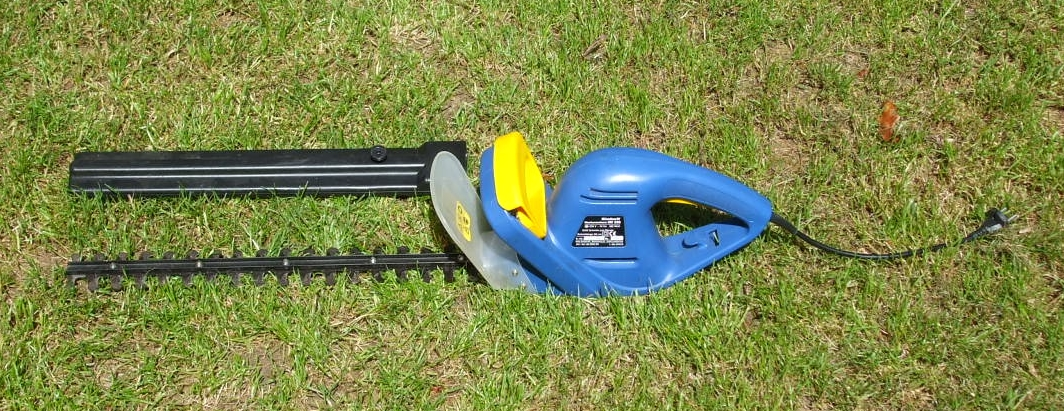
An electric hedge trimmer

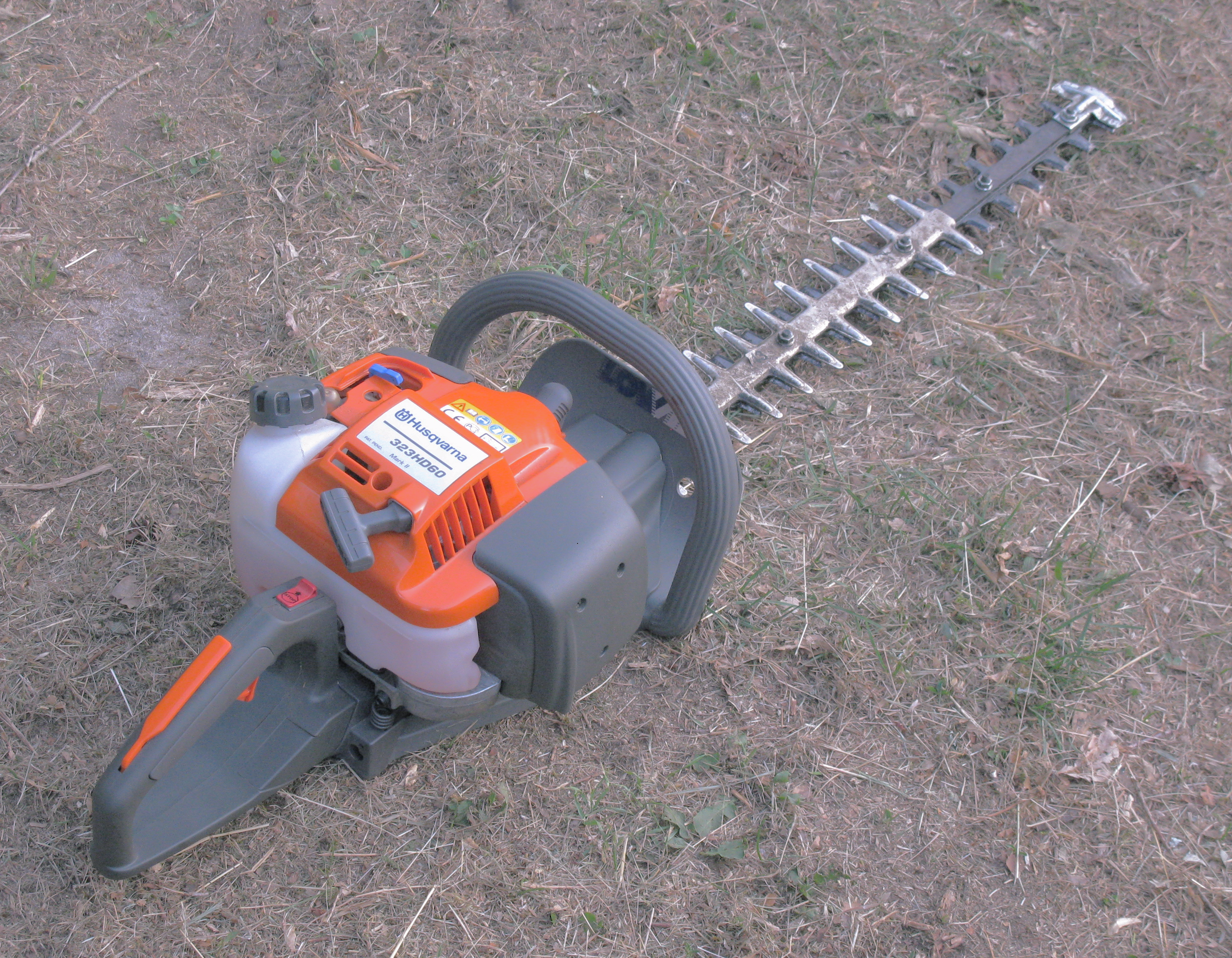
A gasoline-powered hedge trimmer

=== Tractor-mounted hedge trimmers ===
Tractor-mounted and tractor-driven hedge trimmers also exist but are uncommon. These machines consist of a moveable arm (hydraulic boom) with a large hedge trimmer attachment at its end. Their cutting mechanism is similar to that of finger-bar mowers.

Such large hedge trimmers are often confused with tractor-mounted reach flail mowers (booms with flail mower attachments), which appear similar due to the use of booms. And in colloquial language both, tractor-mounted hedge trimmers and reach flail mowers, are imprecisely called hedge cutters, or brush cutters. In contrast to tractor-mounted hedge trimmers, reach flail mowers have a different cutting mechanism and are not only used for trimming hedges but also in several other fields of application (mowing taller grass, road verge cutting, ditch maintenance, etc.).

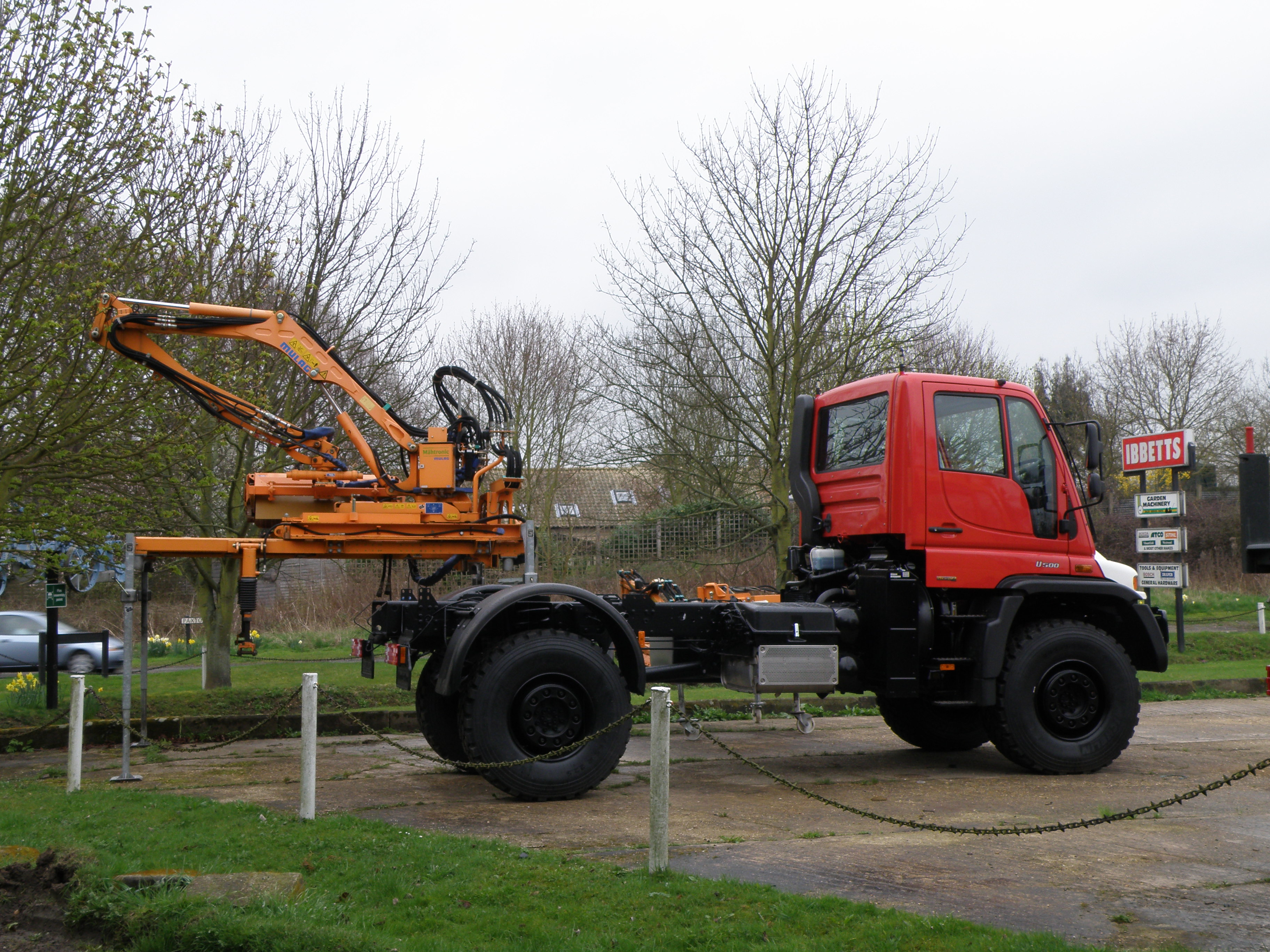
Unimog with a flail hedge and verge trimmer implement used in agroforestry

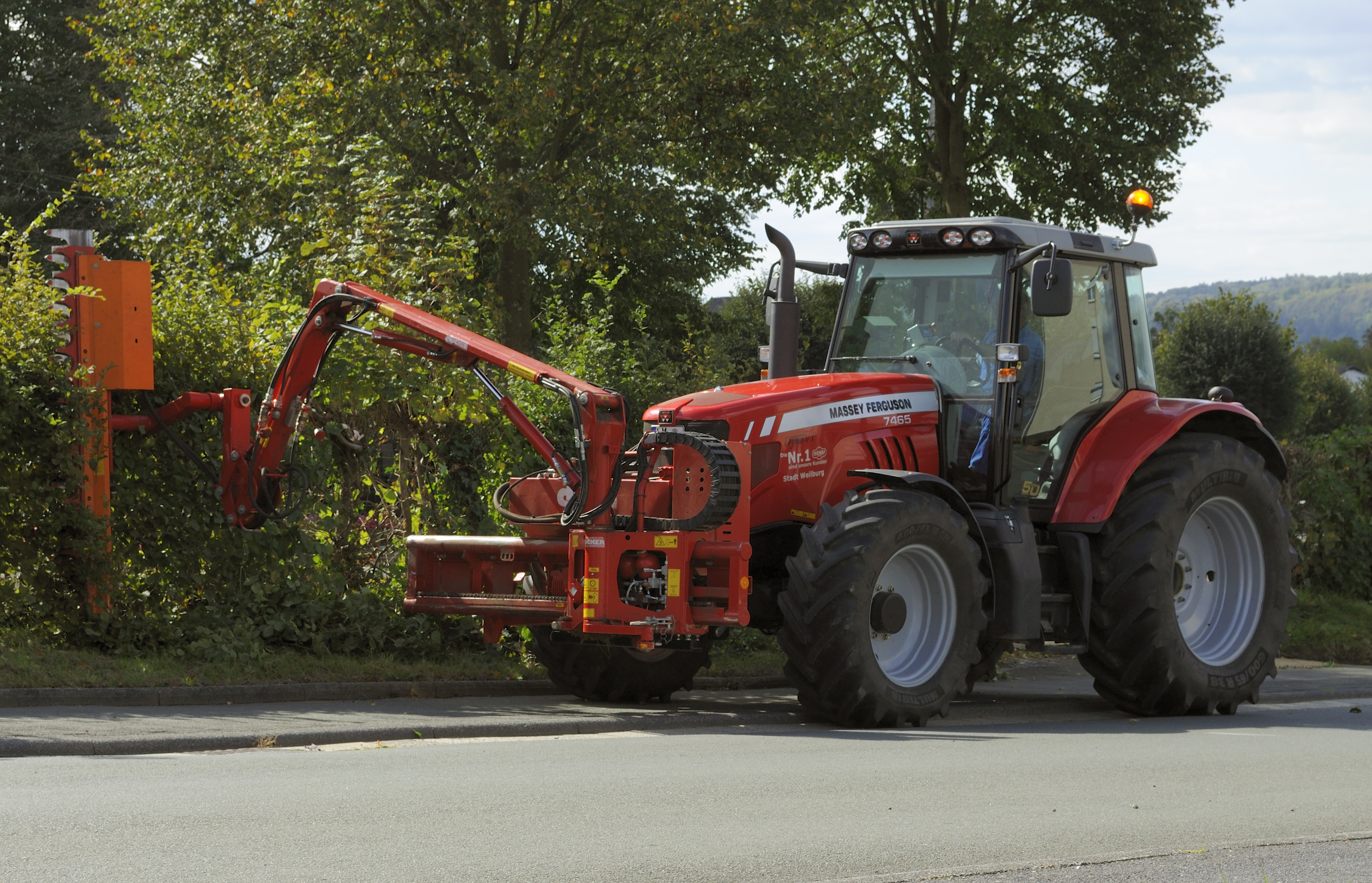
A tractor-mounted hedge trimmer ("hedge cutter")

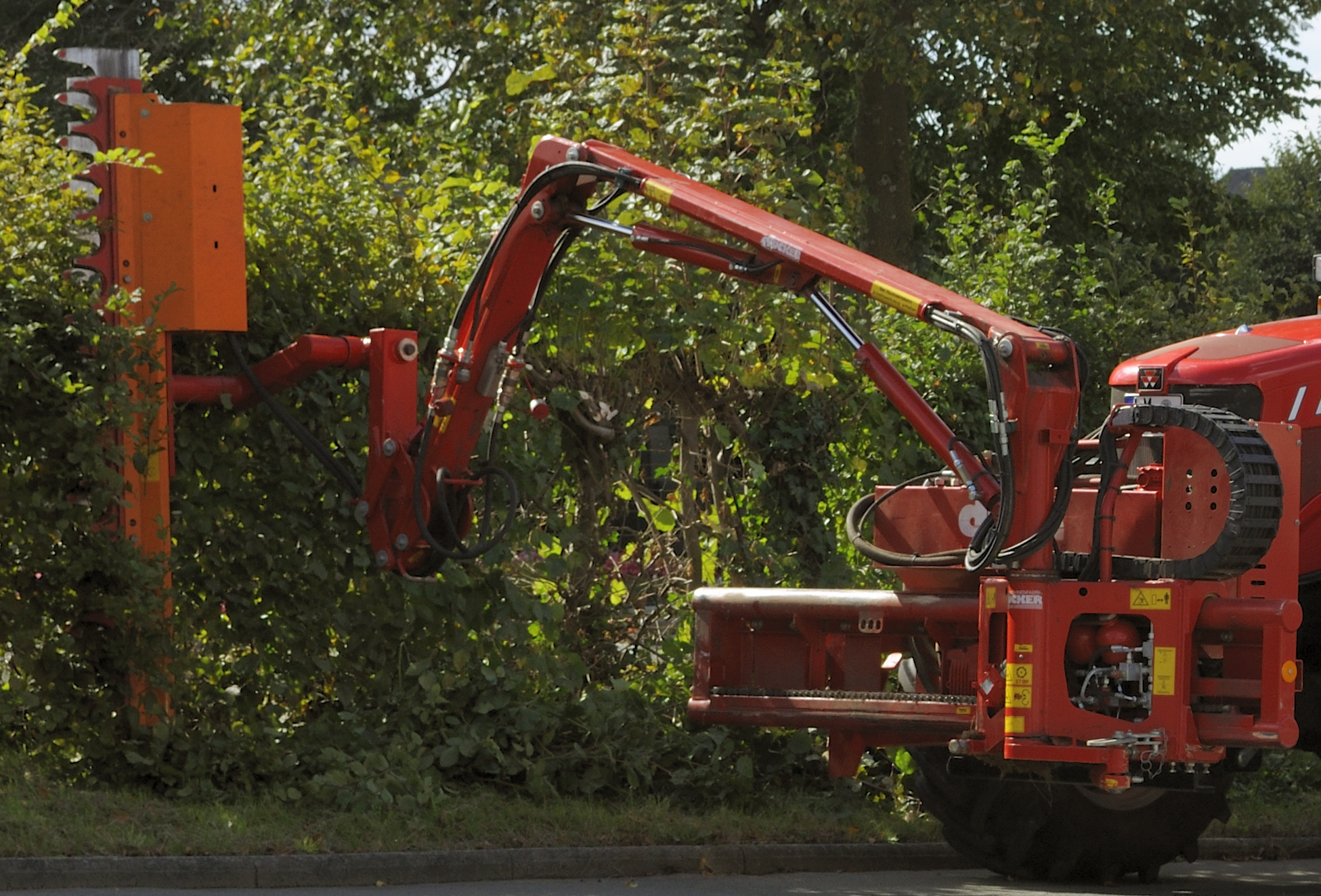
Detail view

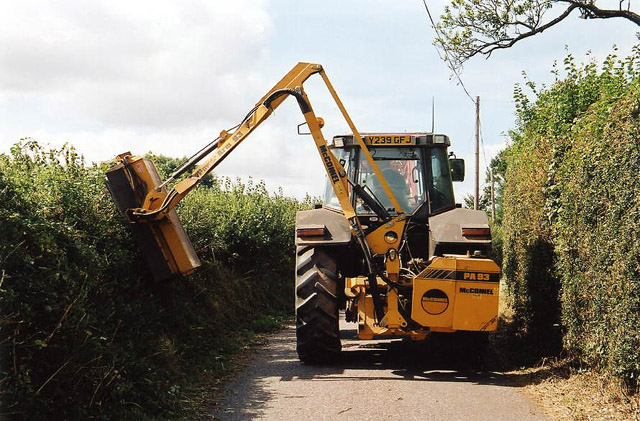
A reach flail mower used for cutting hedges
