= Roller mower =

Rotary mowers

A roller mower, or rollermower, is a tractor-powered multi-spindled rotary mowers that have full width rollers front and rear. Most rollermowers attach to a four-wheeled tractor via the three-point linkage and are powered by the tractor's power take-off (PTO), though larger models connect three or more complete mowing decks to a separate chassis that is towed behind the tractor. Good rollermowers can produce a finish rivalling that of reel (cylinder) mowers while generally being far more robust and requiring considerably less maintenance. Modern machines can also cope efficiently with a wider range of grass lengths and densities than cylinder mowers.

== History ==
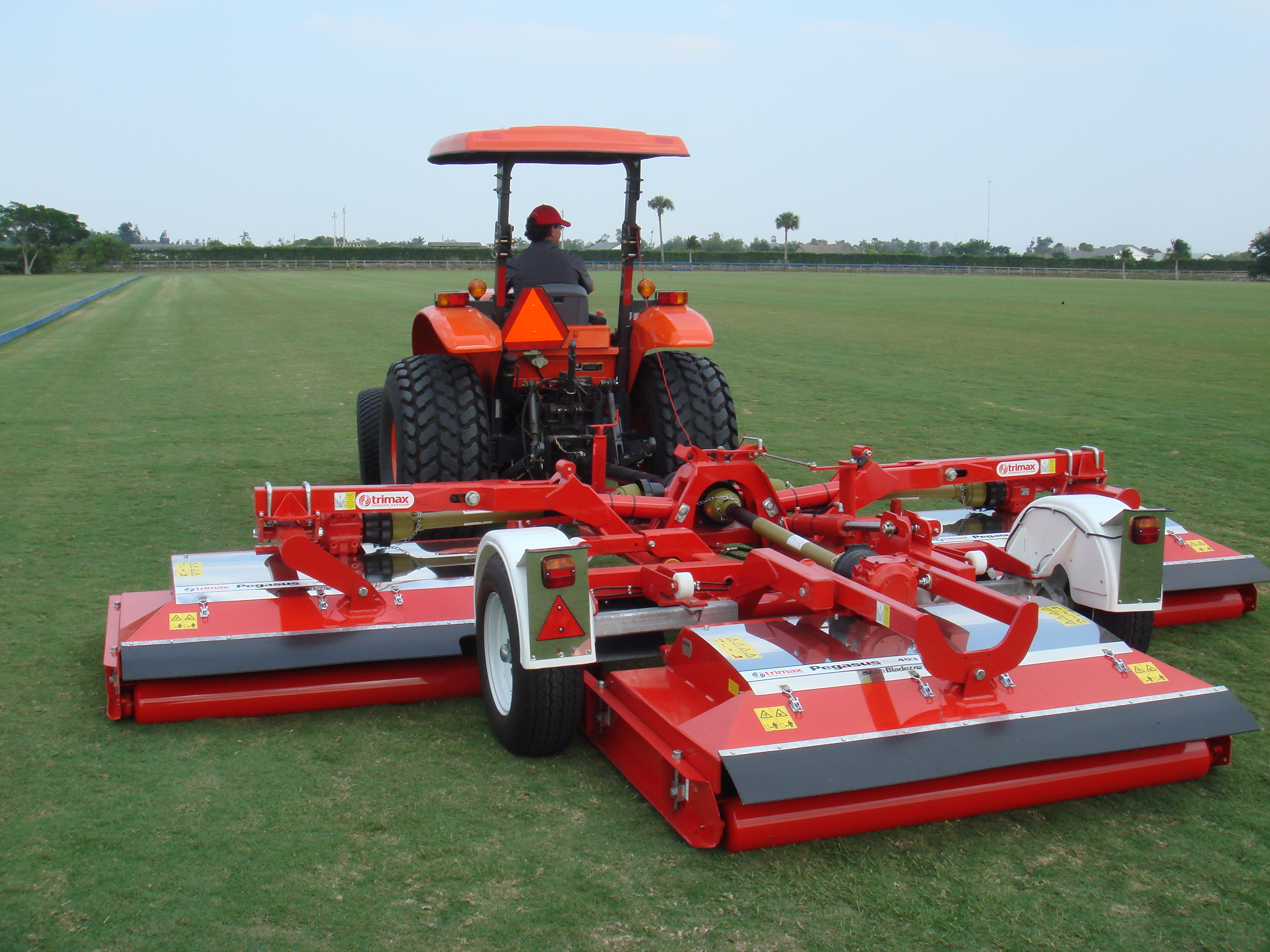
Trimax Pegasus S3 tri-deck double roller mower (2008)

The original developer of the rollermower is uncertain, but Howard Rotavator Pty Ltd manufactured and sold the 72RLM (later the HS20RLM/180) Rollamowa in Australia from the early 1970s. These were linkage-mounted three-spindled rotary mowers with a cutting width of 1.8m (72”). A larger version (HS20RLM/300) was also produced before manufacturing ceased in about 1984. The company was absorbed by Howard Australia Pty Ltd and from 1985 sourced its rollermowers from Trimax Industries Ltd (later Trimax Mowing Systems) in New Zealand. Trimax then sold the same machines under the Trimax brand around the world.

As of 2012, several other companies throughout the world manufacture a variety of rollermowers. These included Major Equipment in the United Kingdom, which manufactures roller mowers for sports pitches, golf courses, racecourses, and lawns.
