= Swathe =

Strip of mown crop left behind the mower

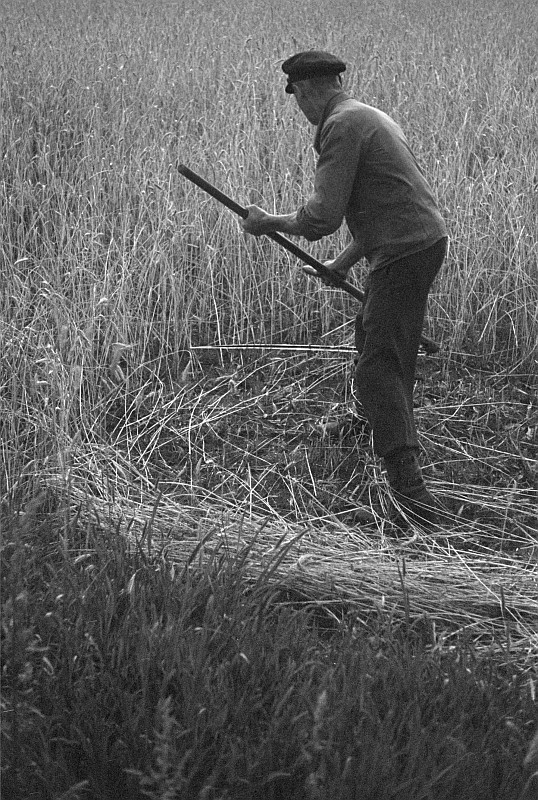
A mower with a scythe cuts a swathe through the crop.

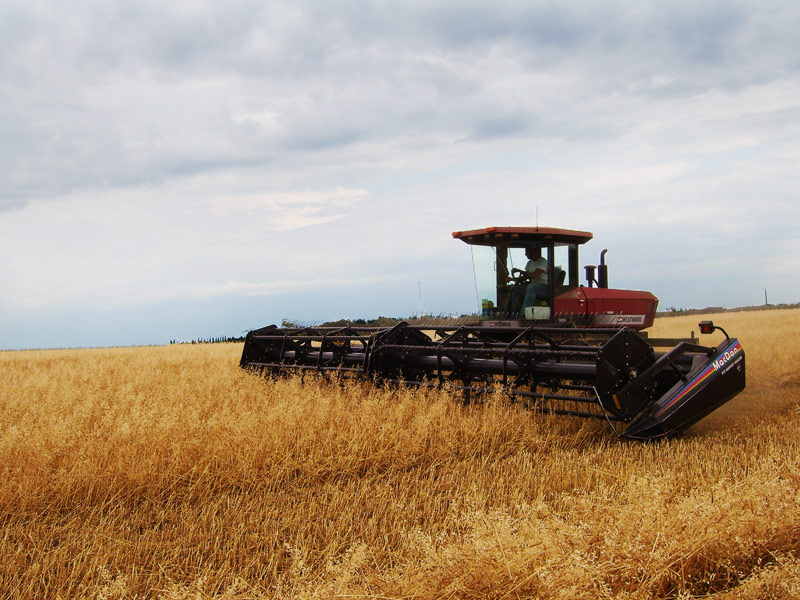
A mechanical swather.

A swathe (/sweɪð/ British English, rhymes with "bathe"; or swath /swɒθ/ American English, rhymes with "swap") is the strip of cut crop made by a scythe or a mowing-machine. A mower with a scythe cuts a swathe along the mowing-edge leaving the uncut grass to the right and the cut grass laid in a windrow to the left on the previously mown land. The swathe width depends on the blade length, the nature of the crop, and the mower, but for grass is usually about 1.5 metres (4.9 ft) wide. When mowing in a team the mowers start at the edge of a meadow in a staggered line, then proceed clockwise, leaving a series of swathes with windrows and finishing in the middle.

The scythe has generally been replaced by machinery, such as a mechanical swather or a combine harvester, which cut much wider swathes while forming windrows. Early in the introduction of machinery, when horses or tractors had to precede a towed cutter, it was still necessary for mowers with scythes to open up a swathe wide enough to take the machine before it could start.

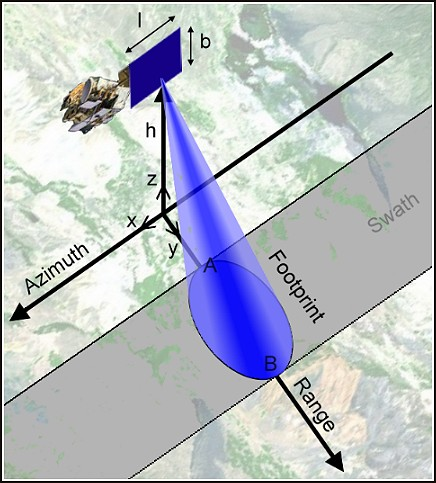
Swathe width of a satellite.

Swathe width may also refer to the width of any repetitively cut, scanned or sampled strip such as in aerial mapping, lidar, radar or sonar scans or multibeam echosounder bathymetric surveys collected by a moving satellite, aircraft or ship.

== See also ==
- Combine harvester
- Scythe
- Swather
