= MacDon Industries Ltd. =

Canadian agricultural equipment manufacturer

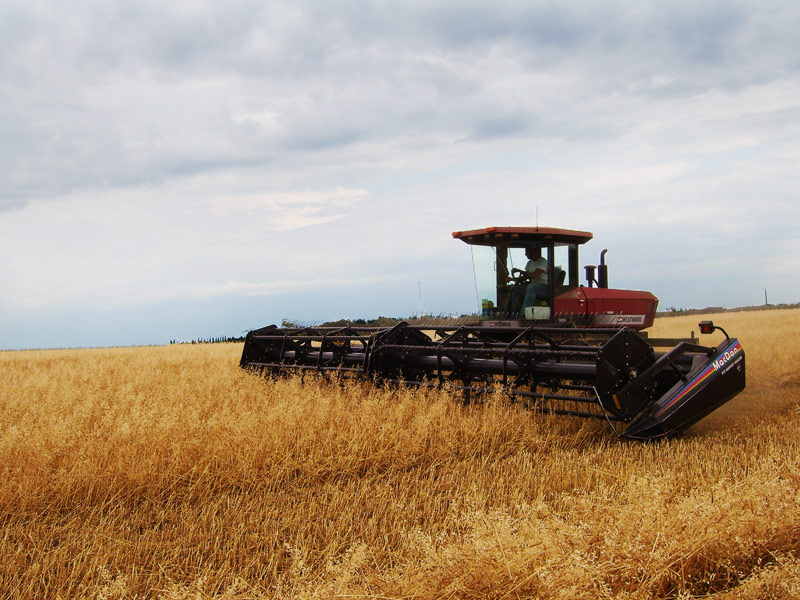
MacDon swather in operation

MacDon Industries Ltd. is a Canadian manufacturer of specialty agricultural equipment. The company was established by Joe MacDonald (1924–1991) of Truro, Nova Scotia in 1970, having purchased Killbery Industries Ltd., which had been manufacturing swathers (windrowers) since 1949.

With an 800,000 square feet (74,000 m^{2}) factory in the Murray Industrial Park in Winnipeg, Manitoba, the company employed 1,350 people in 2015, and sold its products worldwide. Besides selling under their own name, the company also manufactures agricultural equipment for other companies including John Deere, producing self-propelled windrowers, headers and pull-type mowers, sold under the John Deere brand. On December 14, 2017, Linamar Corp. of Guelph, Ontario announced its intent to purchase MacDon for approximately 1.2 billion dollars. Prior to its sale, the president and CEO of the company was Gary Giesbrecht.
