= Mower (company) =

Marketing company in the United States

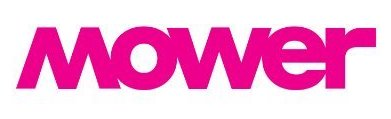
- Industry: Marketing
- Founded: 1959; 67 years ago
- Headquarters: Syracuse, New York, United States
- Key people: Eric Mower (Executive Chair) Stephanie Crockett (President and CEO) Doug Kamp (Chief Creative Officer)
- Number of employees: 145 (2024)
- Website: mower.com

Mower (formerly Eric Mower + Associates) is an American full-service integrated marketing communications agency specializing in business-to-business (B2B) and consumer (B2C) marketing, advertising, and public relations. It is headquartered in Syracuse, New York.

== History ==
Eric Mower joined the three person Silverman Advertising agency in 1968 and in 1975 the company was renamed Silverman & Mower. In 1980, the agency became Eric Mower and Associates when Eric Mower purchased the firm.

Mower combined with Levy King & White of Buffalo, N.Y., in 1990 and Blair BBDO of Rochester, N.Y., in 1991. EMA opened its offices in Albany, N.Y., in 1996 and in Atlanta, Ga., in 1998. EMA combined with Sage Marcom of Syracuse, N.Y. in 2001; and Price McNabb of Charlotte, N.C. in 2004. In 2008, EMA combined with Mark Russell & Associates of Syracuse, N.Y. and Atlanta and with Sawchuck Brown Associates of Albany, N.Y. In addition, EMA combined with Strata-G Communications of Cincinnati, Ohio in 2012 and Middleton & Gendron of New York City in 2014. In October 2015, EMA combined with HB Agency, a Boston-based integrated marketing and public relations agency.

In 2018, marking Eric Mower's 50 years with the company, the agency underwent a strategic rebrand, simplifying its name from Eric Mower + Associates to Mower. The rebrand was intended to modernize the company's image and signal its evolution from a founder-centric firm toward a broader organization with depth in multiple service areas and leadership beyond the founder.

In 2019, Doug Kamp was named chief creative officer.

In 2021, Stephanie Crockett was named president and chief operating officer. In January 2023, following the ESOP transition, Crockett was promoted to chief executive officer, and Eric Mower transitioned to the role of executive chair, reducing his day-to-day operational responsibilities while maintaining strategic oversight.

In August 2022, Eric Mower sold 100% ownership of the company via an employee stock ownership plan. Mower stated the transition would help preserve the firm's independence and professional values. In January 2023, Stephanie Crockett was appointed chief executive officer, becoming the agency's first female CEO. According to the company, the majority of employee owners under the ESOP structure are women.

== Operations ==
The agency employs 145 people in the following locations: New York City, Buffalo, Albany, Rochester, Syracuse, Chicago, Atlanta, Boston, Denver, Miami, Charlotte, Cincinnati and Nashville. In 2022, Mower became a 100% employee-owned company through an Employee Stock Ownership Plan structure, which is relatively uncommon in the advertising and marketing services industry.

In 2023, Ragan Communications named Mower to its Top Places to Work list. In 2023 and 2024, PRWeek named Mower to its Best Places to Work list. In 2021, 2014 and 2012, Mower was named by Ad Age as one of the 50 "Best Places to Work" in advertising. Mower was also named a "Top Place to Work in PR" five times by PR News, most recently in 2020, and was twice named Agency of the Year by Bulldog Reporter. The agency's work has been recognized in the Cannes Lion, Clio, One Show, Addy, PRSA Silver Anvil, ACE and B2B Awards.

== Notable campaigns ==
- Carhartt Company Gear "More Than a Uniform"
- Arthritis Foundation "We Journey Together"
- FirstEnergy Drone Safety Zone
- Sun Chemical "Experience. Transformation."
- New York State Tourism Industry Association "Roam the Empire"
- Iroquois Healthcare Association "The Caring Gene"

== Achievements ==
The Association of National Advertisers (ANA) recognized Mower as an Agency of the Year in its B2 Awards for four consecutive years: 2022 (Midsize category), 2023 (Large category), 2024 (Large category), and 2025 (Midsize category). In 2025, Mower won twelve awards in the competition, the highest number received by any single agency that year. The agency won awards for clients including the FirstEnergy’s “Drone Zone Safety Game,” Prysmian Group’s “The Prysmian League,” One Hundred Black Men of New York’s “Open Every Door,” New York State Tourism Industry Association's “Roam the Empire,” National Grid's “More Opportunities in More Places,” Iroquois Healthcare Association's “Caring Gene,” ABB's “eMine” and “Adaptive Execution,” and Mower's internal agency rebrand “Making Fierce Friends.”

PRNews named Mower to its Agency Elite Top 125 ranking three consecutive years 2023-2025. Mower received 26 awards in 2025 in the 42nd Annual Healthcare Advertising Awards, including two Best of Show recognitions. Client work for Catholic Health, Allegheny Health Network, Heritage Christian Services, ICU Medical, Novant Health and Mower's “The Doctor Dodger” health promotion program was honored. Mower won in five categories at the 2025 Indie Awards including the Gold for B2B Campaign of the Year.

In 2024, Mower was recognized in Chief Marketer's list of the 200 best marketing firms in the United States for the seventh consecutive year. Mower won the Grand Prix, as well as the ‘Best Response to Change’ category at The Drum Awards for B2B in 2021 with its work for the Iroquois Health Association.

The New York State Tourism Industry Association awarded Mower with its first New Yorker Award in 2022 in recognition of the agency's development of the Roam the Empire campaign to aid tourism businesses in their recovery from the pandemic. The Diversity Action Alliance selected Mower's work for One Hundred Black Men of New York as the 2022 Best DEI Advocacy Campaign. Mower also earned both a Gold and Silver Adrian Award for its work in travel and tourism marketing during the 2020 Hospitality Sales & Marketing Association International (HSMAI) Adrian Awards.

Mower was ranked 14th in City & State's New York Political PR Power 50. The ranking lists the top strategic communications professionals in New York politics and policy. CenterState CEO named Mower a 2023 Business of the Year. The Rochester Business Journal named the agency a 2023 Elevating Women honoree.

In recognition of his contributions to the industry, Eric Mower was inducted into the Association of National Advertisers Business-to-Business Marketing Hall of Fame in 2019 at the Masters of B2B Marketing Conference in Chicago. In 2022, the Business Council of New York State awarded him the Corning Award for Excellence in business leadership and corporate responsibility.
