= Conditioner (farming) =

Agricultural machine to help hay to dry

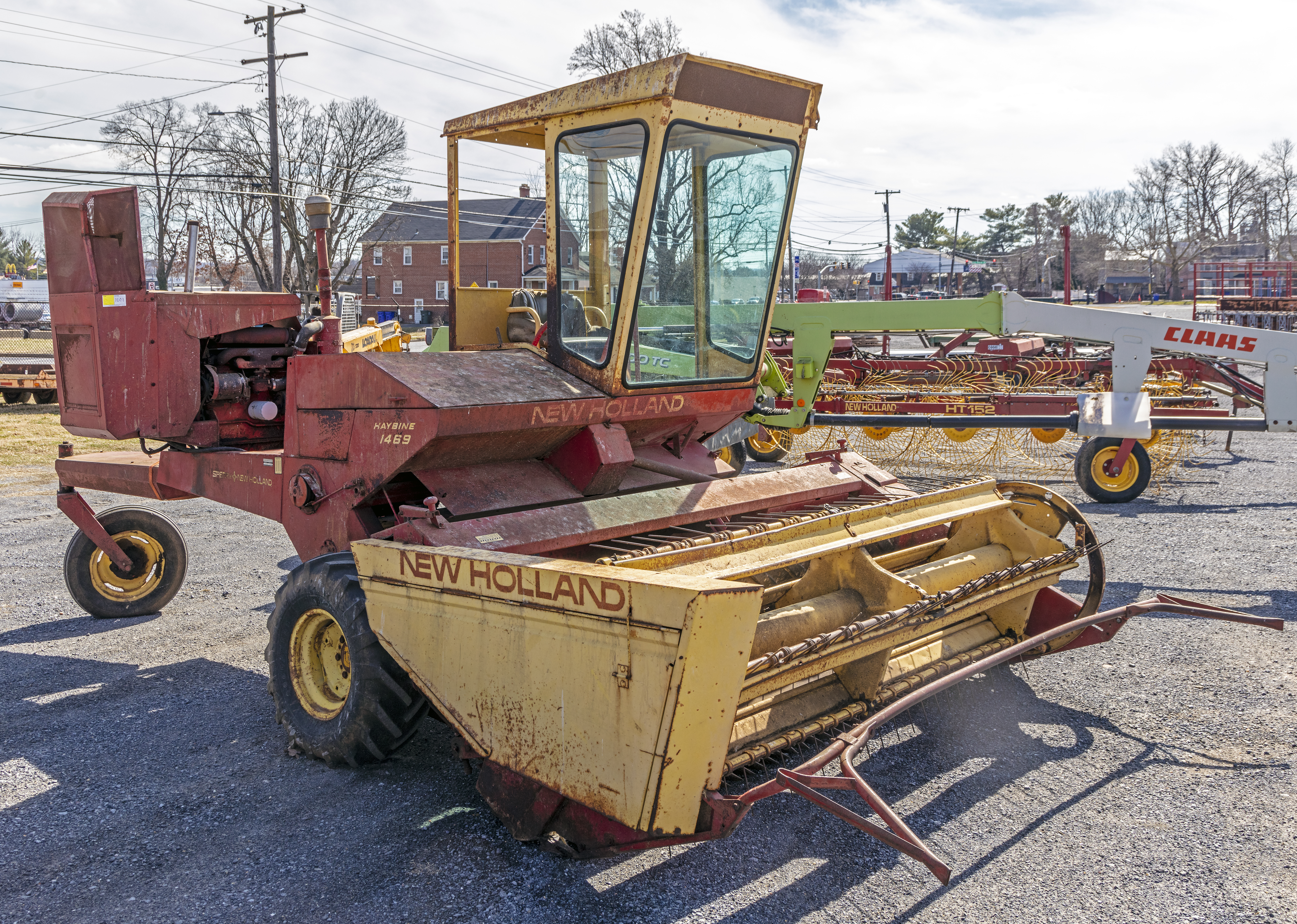
New Holland Haybine 1469

A conditioner (or hay conditioner) is a farm implement that crimps and crushes newly cut hay to promote faster and more even drying. Drying the hay efficiently is most important for first cutting of the hay crop, which consists of coarse stalks that take a longer period of time to draw out moisture than finer-textured hays, such as second and subsequent cuttings.

A conditioner is made up of two grooved rollers which the hay is forced through, causing the stalks to split, thus allowing the liquid trapped behind cell walls (sap and cell sap) to leak out and also giving more surface area for evaporation. The stand-alone conditioner is no longer used on most farms, since the conditioner has been incorporated into mower-conditioners, which combine the mower and conditioner into a single machine. The names Haybine and Discbine are brand names of mower-conditioners, although some farmers use these names somewhat generically.

== Mower-conditioners ==
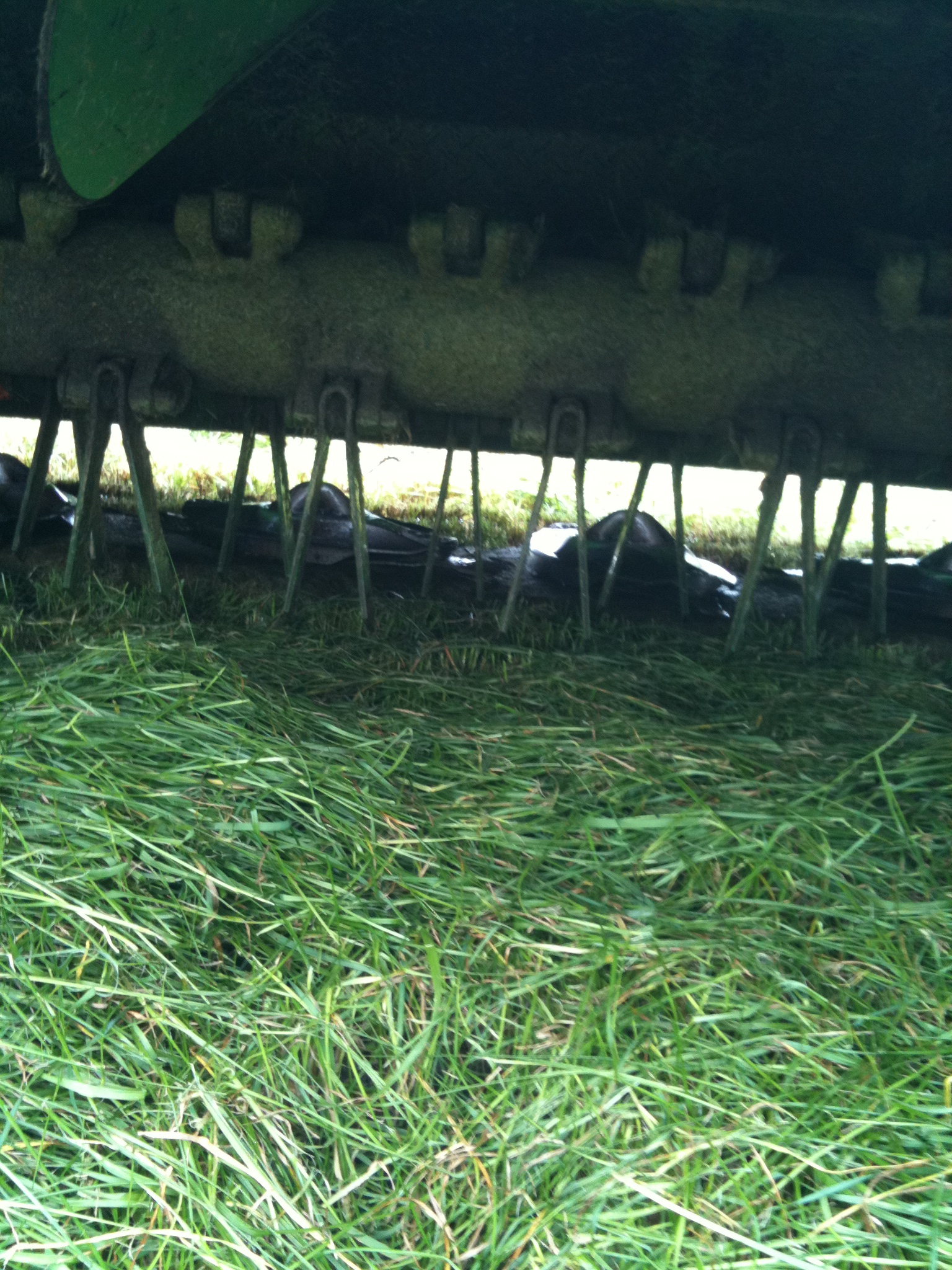
Mower with conditioner

Mower-conditioners are a staple of large-scale hay making. Mower-conditioners are defined by the mechanisms that accomplish mowing and conditioning.

There are three types of mowers: sickle bar mowers, disc mowers, and drum mowers. Sickle bar mowers use a reciprocating blade to cut the grass and typically use a reel to fold the grass over the knife. Disc mowers have a number of hubs across the cutting width, each hub having a small (18") rotating disc with knives. Drum mowers use two or three large plates (called the drums, about 36" across) which ride over the ground as they are spinning. A sickle bar mower's main advantage over disc mowers and drum mowers is the reduced horsepower requirements. Its disadvantage is the extra maintenance required due to the high number of moving parts and wear items. Disc mowers were historically considered an "all the eggs in one basket" kind of mower because all the mower hubs were in one large gearbox. If one blade hit something and a gear tooth broke, the whole gearbox would suffer a catastrophic failure, and there would be nothing worth fixing. If anything broke, everything broke. Drum mowers prevented this by having typically two belt-driven drums compared to six or more gear-driven hubs. Modern disc mowers use isolated gearboxes, and if one fails it can be swapped out without rebuilding the entire machine.

Conditioners come in three main types: rubber-roller conditioners, steel-roller, and flail. The roller conditioners consist of two opposing rolls that have a raised, interlocking pattern. The rollers have either a rubber or steel pattern and a steel main shaft. The crop is crimped between the rollers, decreasing the drying time. The flail conditioner is an arrangement of steel Vs on a main shaft that beat the crop against the top of the mower-conditioner. The flail conditioner reduces drying time by removing the waxy coating on the crop, making them highly effective for grass forage but potentially causing excessive leaf loss in delicate legumes like alfalfa.

Even though conditioners can shorten the dry time of the hay, they can come with problems in the hayfield. The space between the two opposing rolls can decrease or increase by the users needs, but there is a max area of opening. This can cause a breakdown or problem in the machine. If the hay is wet or lay downed in the field it can bunch together when pushed into the conditioner rolls. This can jam the rolls, even causing the hay to wrap completely around them. If caught early, the user can shut down the machine and cut the hay free by hand. If it is not caught early this can stop the bars from rolling, thus stopping the belts from turning the machine, then stopping the tractor. If this happens, one is looking at major problems with their machinery. Not only can this damage the rolls, but also the belts on the mower-conditioner can snap, and the tractor itself will be receiving considerable amounts of stress on its engine. Even though this can be a major money and time-consuming problem, if the user is alert and constantly aware of their equipment's performance, this issue should never go further than a small stoppage.

Haybine is the brand name of the first mower-conditioner. It combined the sickle bar mower and the hay conditioner to promote faster drying hay all in one process. The current versions produced by New Holland are branded the Discbine, since they now feature faster disc mowers.

== See also ==
- Hay § Modern mechanized techniques
- Swather
- Baler
- Tedder (machine)
