= Brush hog =

Powered vegetation cutter

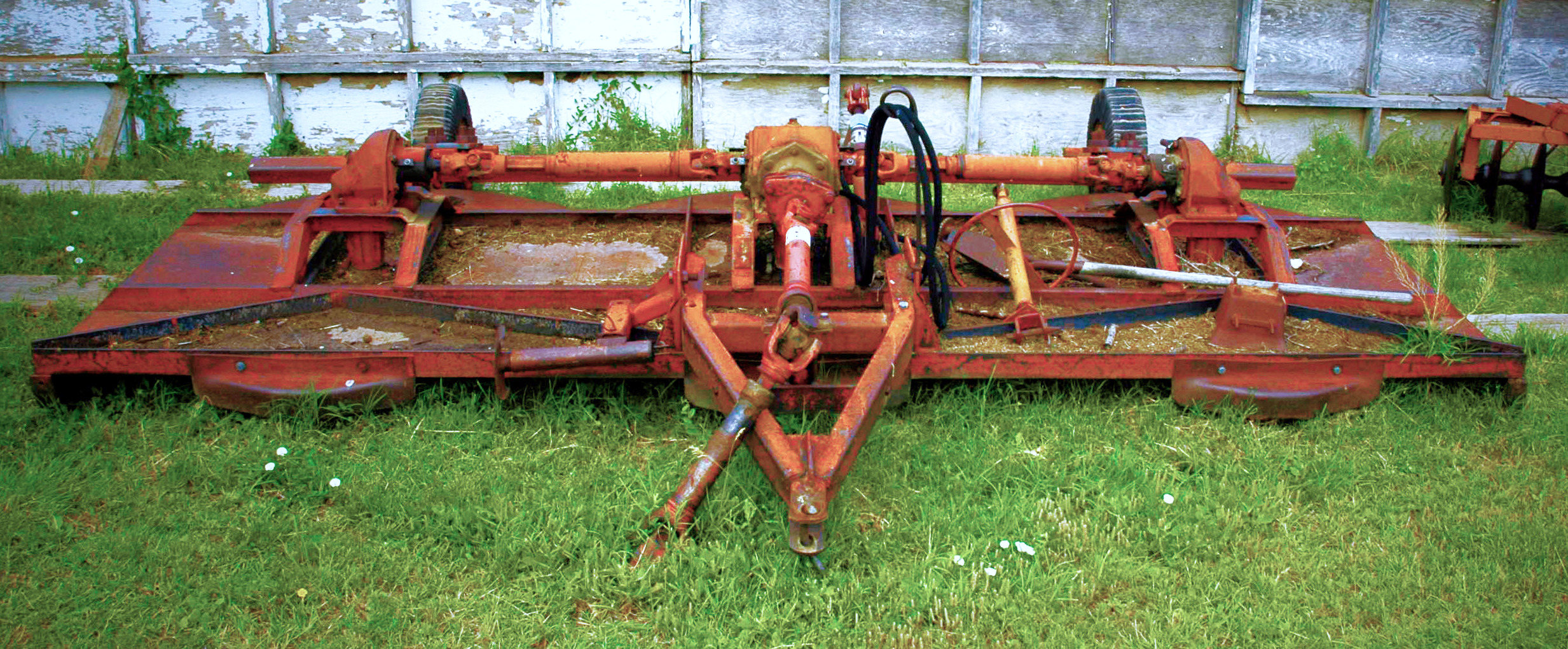
Brush hog

A bush hog or "brush hog" is a type of rotary mower. Typically these mowers are designed to be towed behind a farm tractor using the three-point hitch and are driven via the power take-off (PTO). It has blades that are not rigidly attached to the drive like a lawnmower blade, but are on hinges so if the blade hits a rock or stump, it bounces backward and inward, and then centrifugal force makes it go outwards again.

The rotary blades are not sharpened in the same way as a conventional mower blade. They are usually quite dull so they whack through dense plant growth, whereas a sharp blade often gets stuck or slowed. The blades are very heavy, up to an inch thick, so the centrifugal force pulling out is stronger than the forces of the vegetation bouncing in. They are made of heat treated high carbon steel that can withstand strikes with hard objects such as rocks and stones.

== Types of brush hog ==
Two archetypes of this type of mower are the Bush Hog which is made by Bush Hog, Inc. of Selma, Alabama, and the Flex-Wing by RhinoAg of Gibson City, Illinois. The formal name for this type of implement is a rotary cutter or rotary mower, although it differs from mowers in that it does not cut with a sharp blade, but rather severs with an intentionally very dull wedge-like blade.

Several other manufacturers make these types of mowers including:

- Bush-Whacker
- DR Power Equipment
- Hardee By EVH Manufacturing Co.
- King Kutter
- Land Pride
- RhinoAg
- Woods Equipment

There are two types of attachment for a rotary mower, either using the three-point hitch or via a draw bar. The height of the cut on models attached on the three-point hitch is adjusted using the hitch control lever. This adjusts the height of the front of mower. For more radical height adjustment the rear wheel can also be adjusted. Typically the mowers in this category range from 3.3 to 22 feet (1 to 7 m) mowing widths.

A rotary mower that applies chemical while cutting was patented by Tom Burch of Boone, N.C., and was later sold to Diamond Mowers Inc. of Sioux Falls, S.D., under the name Wet Blade.

On draw bar models the height of the cut is determined using hydraulic rams on the mower itself; this requires remote hydraulics on the tractor. These mowers in this category range from 3.3 to 22 feet (1 to 7 m) mowing width. Draw bar mowers which are able to mow larger widths up to 20 feet (6 m) are available. These are multi-spindle and hinged so that the side wings can move over varied terrain. Also these wings can be folded up into a vertical position to reduce width for transport on roadways.

== Safety ==
The blades on a rotary cutter can have top speeds of over 150 miles per hour (240 km/h). Therefore the kinetic energy enables the blades to cut through saplings and small trees up to several inches/centimetres in diameter. Consequently, these mowers can be very dangerous and contact with the blades would cause severe bodily injury or death.

These cutters also pose a thrown object hazard. Objects such as rocks, stones and roadside debris can be thrown in excess of 300 feet (100 m).

== Sizing ==
Larger rotary cutters require more powerful tractors to effectively operate. Tractor dealers can recommend the right size brush hog for any of their tractors, or tractor and brush hog sizing charts are available on the Internet. Calculators used to estimate the time required to mow different size areas with different size cutters are also available and can be used to help decide which brush hog is the best investment for different situations.
