= Mowers (surname) =

Mowers is a surname. Notable people with the surname include:

- Johnny Mowers (1916–1995), Canadian ice hockey goaltender
- Mark Mowers (born 1974), American ice hockey player

== See also ==
- Bowers (surname)
