= Rotary mower =

Powered vegetation cutter

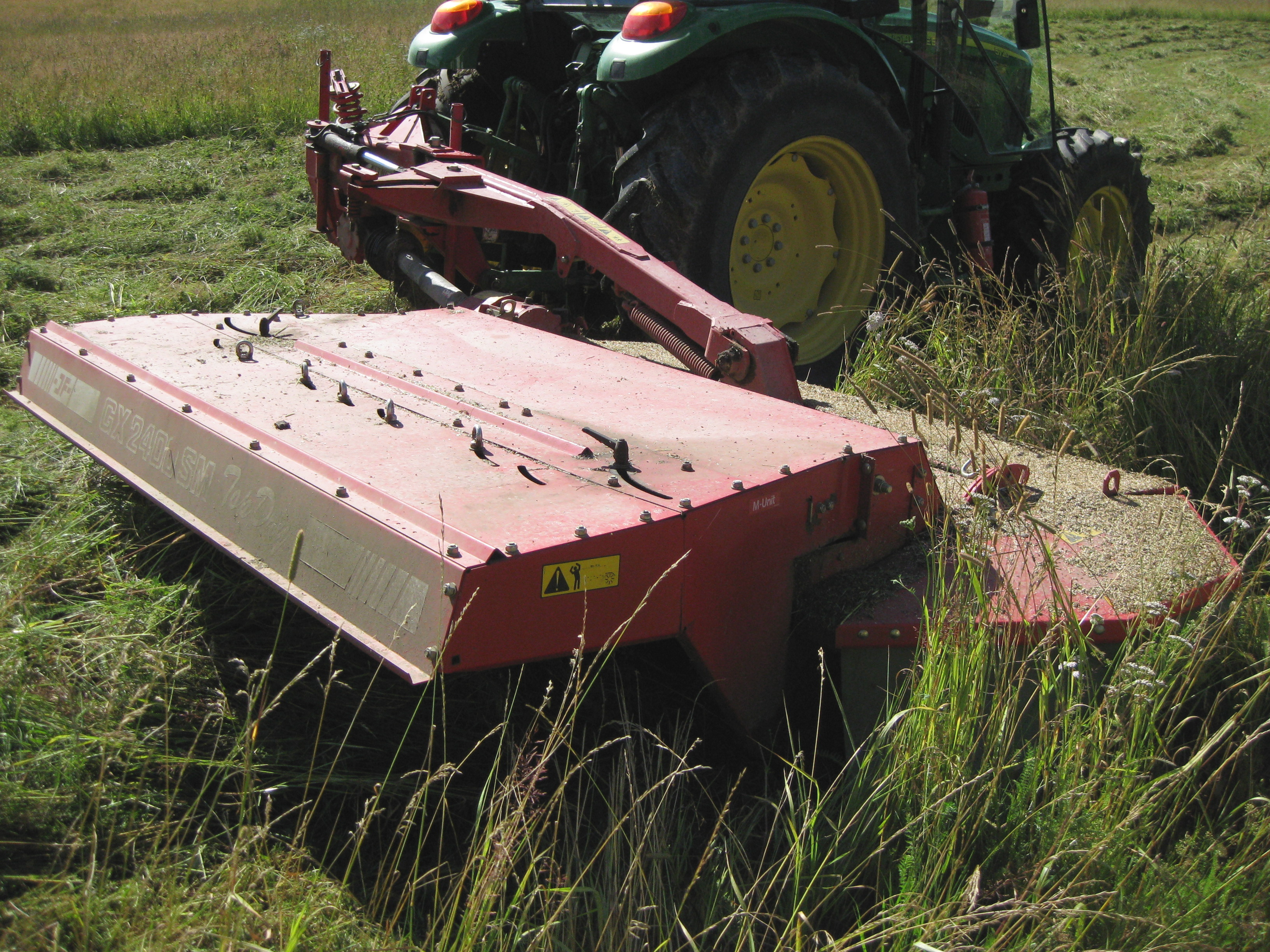

A rotary mower is a unit of powered machinery that uses a rotating blade or blades to cut vegetation.

== Use ==
An American rotary lawnmower mechanic (b. 1927) when queried as to the first rotary mower he knew of - produced a picture of a machine mass produced around 1939 which originally used a Ford Model A or B electric starter motor turned vertically with a steel disc attached to the output shaft having common sickle bar trapezoidal blades riveted upon it. Power originally came from a 6v lead acid battery likewise sourced from a Ford automobile. The machine was pictured in a color photograph dating from about 1964 and had been fitted with a Maytag 2-cycle gasoline engine having its float carburetor on an adapter block turned to permit operation with the crankshaft protruding downward for "vertical crankshaft" operation as is common now. It had only two steel spoked wheels on a single axle and an adjustable tail skid that caused a limited range of cutting heights to be available. In agriculture, a rotary mower is a piece of machinery that is often pulled behind a tractor and powered by the power take-off; it uses thick blades of sharpened metal to cut thick grass, heavy bushes, weeds and even small trees. Due to the high torque and power associated with the implement, shields made of hanging heavy chain or thick vinyl or rubber are often provided around the discharge chute to control flying debris. French agricultural machinery manufacturer Rousseau SA claims to have invented the mechanical rotary mower in 1962.

In horticulture, a rotary mower is usually an integral machine that is either pushed by hand or driven by a riding operator, and used to cut amenity and sports turf. The first successful example was developed in Australia in 1952 by the Victa company.

== See also ==
- Brush hog
- Flail mower
