= Swather =

Harvesting machine

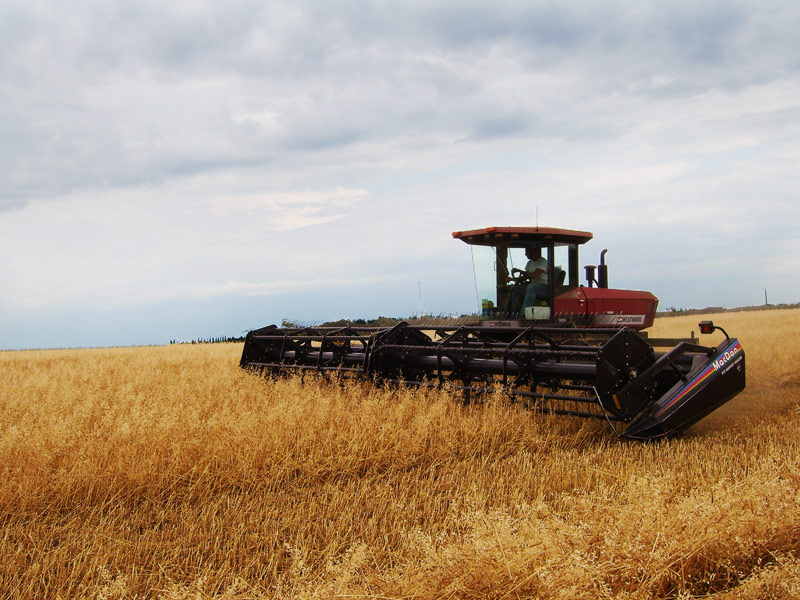
MacDon swather

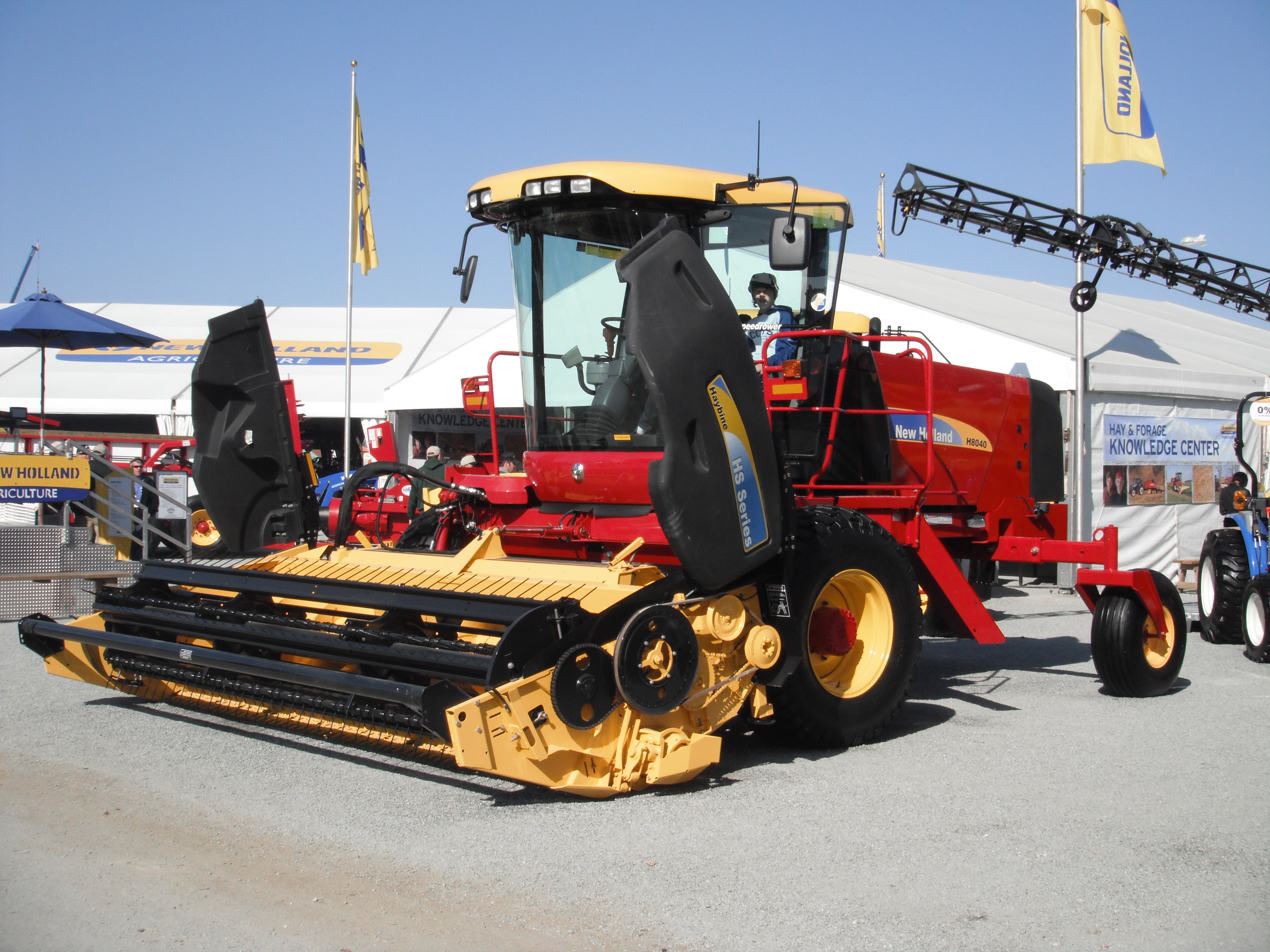
New Holland Haybine H8040 self-propelled swather

A swather (North America), or windrower (Australia and rest of world), is a farm implement that cuts hay or small grain crops and forms them into a windrow for drying.

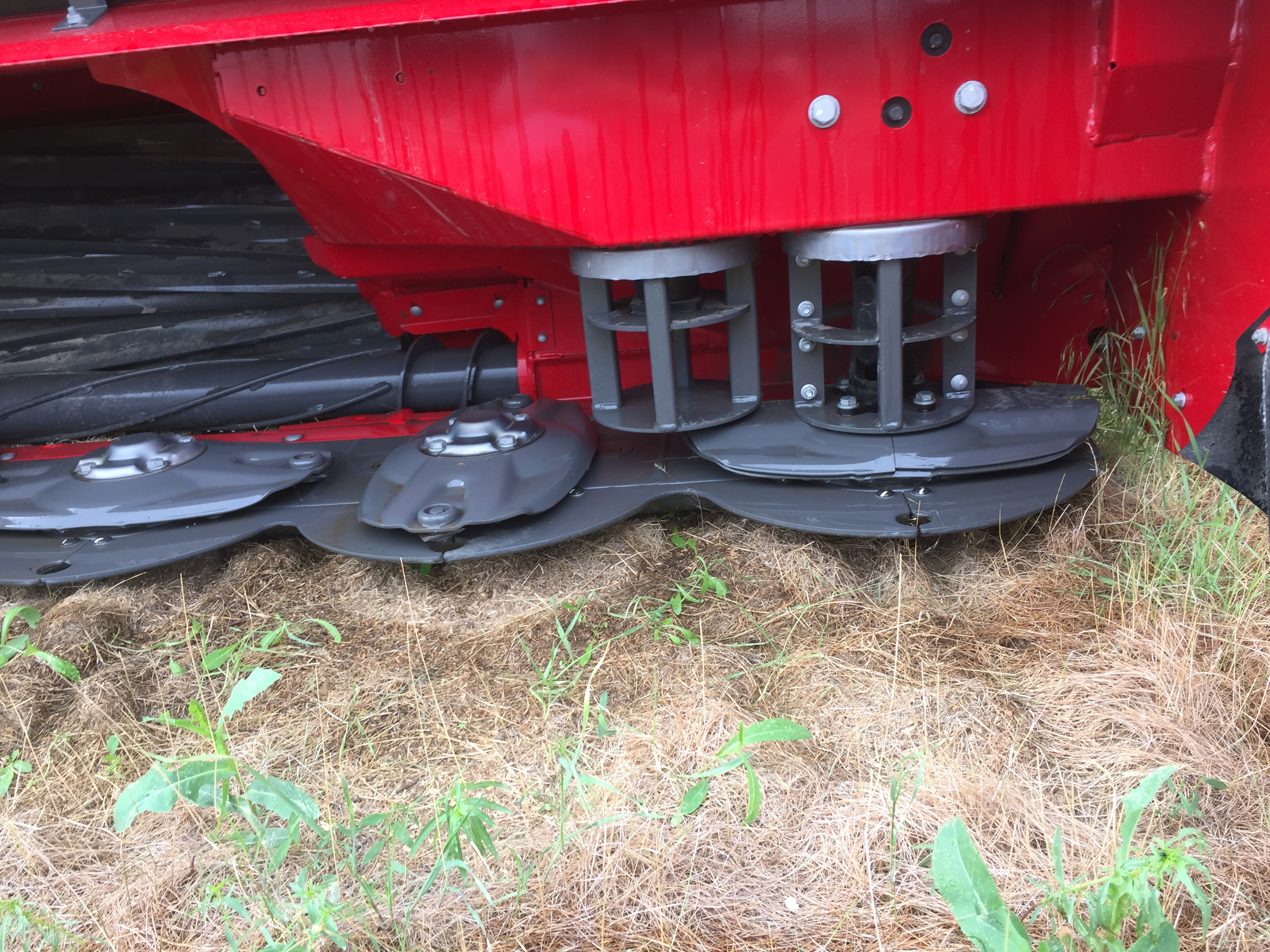
Crimper rollers and cutting discs

They may be self-propelled with an engine, or drawn by a tractor and power take-off powered. A swather uses a reciprocating sickle bar or rotating discs to sever the crop stems. The reel helps cut crop fall neatly onto a canvas or auger conveyor which deposits it into a windrow with stems aligned and supported above the ground by the stubble.

A swather does the same task for hay crops as hand scything, cradling and swathing, or mowing and raking. Horizontal rollers behind the cutters may be used to crimp or condition the stems of hay crops to decrease drying time.

For grains, as combines replaced threshing machines, the swather introduced an optional step in the harvesting process to provide for the drying time that binding formerly afforded. Swathing is still more common in the northern United States and Canada than regions with longer growing seasons where standing grain crops can be harvested directly by combines. Some modern crop varieties capable of rapid maturity have reduced the need for swathing grains even in the north.

As well as accelerating drying of the ripe grain, windrowing the whole of the growing crop provides for a consistent ripening and dehydration of stalk and green weeds to assist in effective post threshing winnowing and separation of the grain and other material. Alternatively, chemical desiccation of weedy or irregularly ripe standing crops with glyphosate, paraquat or diquat has been used to enable direct combining.

A swather is the mascot of sports teams at Hesston High School in Hesston, Kansas. Hesston is home to AGCO Corporation swather and combine harvester manufacturing plants.

== See also ==
- Crop Desiccation
- List of agricultural machinery
