= Mower =

Mechanical vegetation cutter

A robot mower used in difficult terrain, near flood defences in Wales

Comparison of the leaves cut by 1) scythe or sickle 2) reel mower 3) rotary mower

A mower is a person or machine that cuts (mows) grass or other plants that grow on the ground. Usually mowing is distinguished from reaping, which uses similar implements, but is the traditional term for harvesting grain crops, e.g. with reapers and combines.

A smaller mower used for lawns and sports grounds (playing fields) is called a lawn mower or grounds mower, which is often self-powered, or may also be small enough to be pushed by the operator. Grounds mowers have reel or rotary cutters. Larger mowers or mower-conditioners are mainly used to cut grass (or other crops) for hay or silage and often place the cut material into rows, which are referred to as windrows. Swathers (or windrowers) are also used to cut grass (and grain crops). Prior to the invention and adoption of mechanized mowers, (and today in places where use a mower is impractical or uneconomical), grass and grain crops were cut by hand using scythes or sickles.

== Mower configurations ==
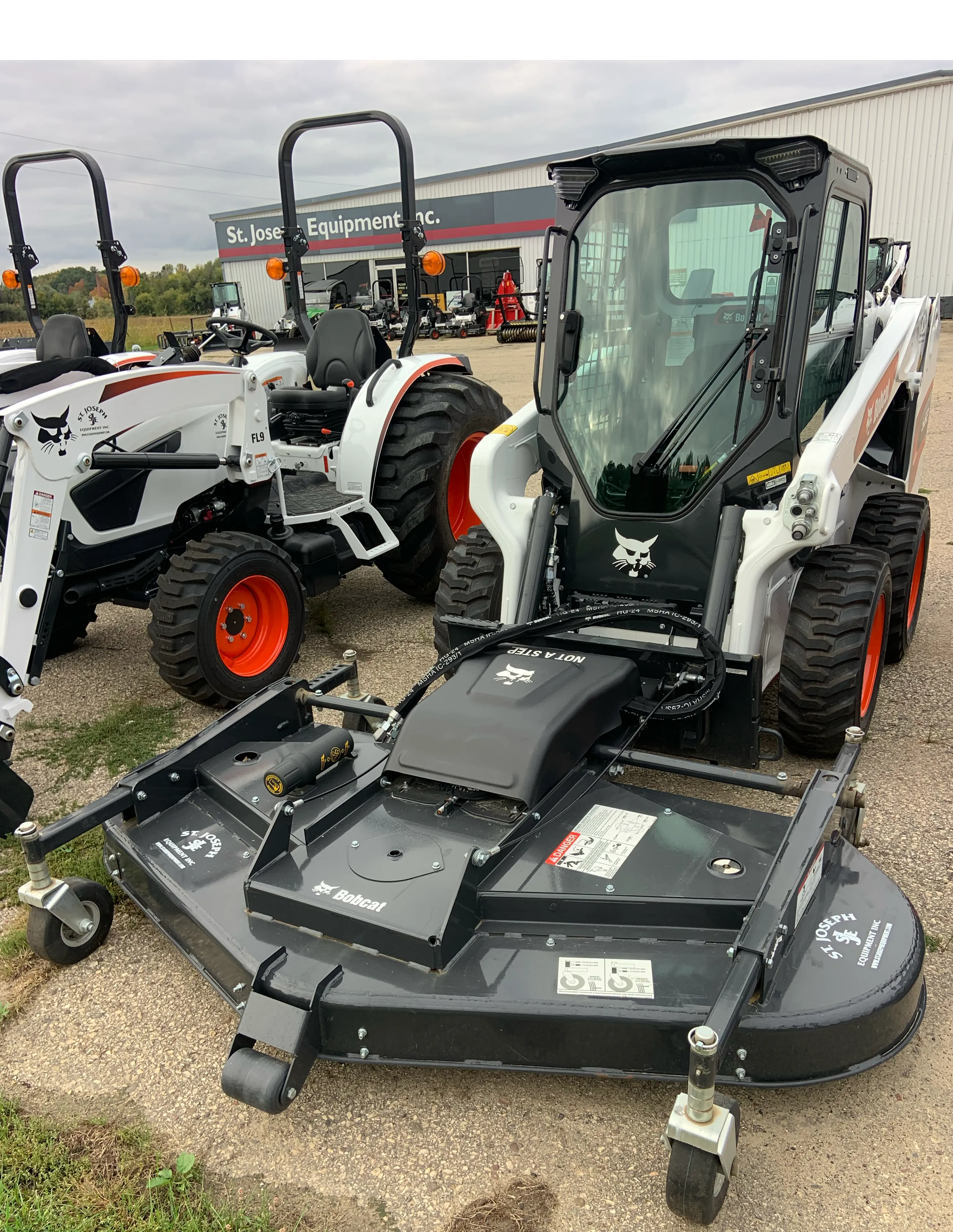
Skid-steer mower

Larger mowers are usually ganged (equipped with a number or gang of similar cutting units), so they can adapt individually to ground contours. They may be powered and drawn by a tractor or draft animals. The cutting units can be mounted underneath the tractor between the front and rear wheels, mounted on the back with a three-point hitch or pulled behind the tractor as a trailer. There are also dedicated self-propelled cutting machines, which often have the mower units mounted at the front and sides for easy visibility by the driver. Boom or side-arm mowers are mounted on long hydraulic arms, similar to a backhoe arm, which allows the tractor to mow steep banks or around objects while remaining on a safer surface.

== Mower types ==
The cutting mechanism in a mower may be one of several different designs:

=== Sickle mower ===
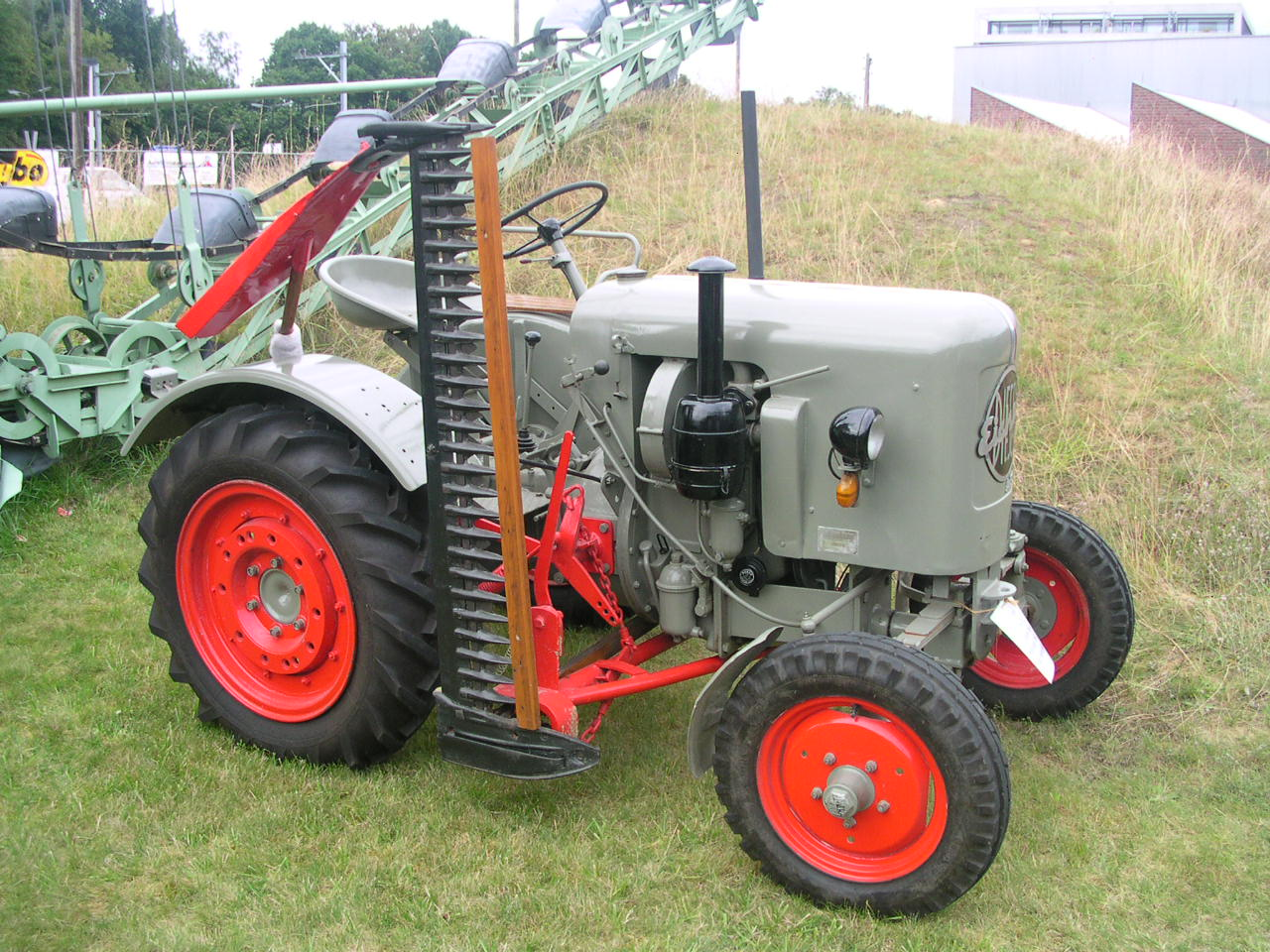
Eicher tractor with a mid-mounted finger-bar mower

Sickle mowers, also called reciprocating mowers, bar mowers, sickle-bar mowers, or finger-bar mowers, have a long (typically six to seven and a half feet) bar on which are mounted fingers with stationary guardplates. In a channel on the bar there is a reciprocating sickle with very sharp sickle sections (triangular blades). The sickle bar is driven back and forth along the channel. The grass, or other plant matter, is cut between the sharp edges of the sickle sections and the finger-plates (similar to the action of an electric hair clipper).

The bar rides on the ground, supported on a skid at the inner end, and it can be tilted to adjust the height of the cut. A spring-loaded board at the outer end of the bar guides the cut hay away from the uncut hay. The so-formed channel, between cut and uncut material, allows the mower skid to ride in the channel and cut only uncut grass cleanly on the next swath. These were the first successful horse-drawn mowers on farms and the general principles still guide the design of modern mowers, which remain distinct for requiring much less tractor horsepower per foot of cut than disc or drum alternatives, albeit at slower ground operating speeds.

=== Rotary mower ===
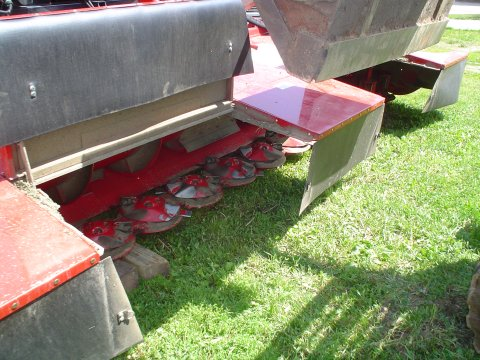
Rotary cutters mounted on a swather

Rotary mowers, also called drum mowers, have a rapidly rotating bar, or disks mounted on a bar, with sharpened edges that cut the crop. When these mowers are tractor-mounted they are easily capable of mowing grass at up to 10 miles per hour (16 km/h) in optimal conditions. Some models are designed to be mounted in double and triple sets on a tractor, one in the front and one at each side, thus able to cut up to 20 foot (6 metre) swaths.

In rough cutting conditions, the blades attached to the disks are swivelled to absorb blows from obstructions. Mostly these are rear-mounted units and in some countries are called scrub cutters. Self-powered mowers of this type are used for rougher grass in gardening and other land maintenance.

=== Reel mower ===
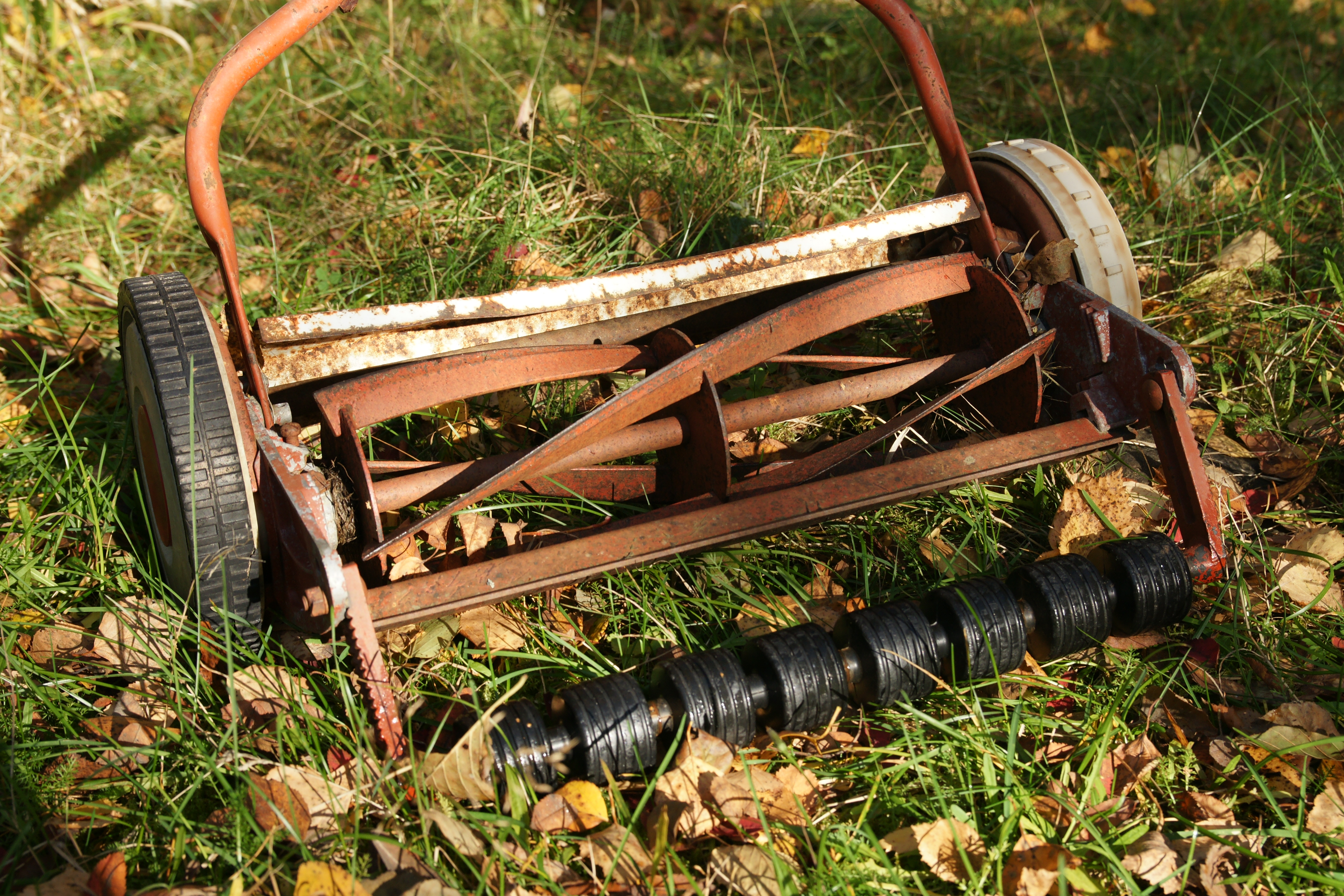
Reel mower

Reel mowers, also called cylinder mowers (familiar as the hand-pushed or self-powered cylinder lawn mower), have a horizontally rotating cylindrical reel composed of helical blades, each of which in turn runs past a horizontal cutter-bar, producing a continuous scissor action. The bar is held at an adjustable level just above the ground and the reel runs at a speed dependent on the forward movement speed of the machine, driven by wheels running on the ground (or in self-powered applications by a motor). The cut grass may be gathered in a collection bin.

This type of mower is used to produce consistently short and even grass on bowling greens, lawns, parks and sports grounds. When pulled by a tractor (or formerly by a horse), these mowers are often ganged into sets of three, five or more, to form a gang mower. A well-designed reel mower can cut quite tangled and thick tall grass, but this type works best on fairly short, upright vegetation, as taller vegetation tends to be rolled flat rather than cut, making these mowers particularly ineffective against tall weeds or tough grass seed heads.

Home reel mowers have certain benefits over motor-powered mowers as they are quieter and not dependent on any extra form of power besides the person doing the mowing. This is useful not only to lessen dependence on other types of power which may have availability issues, but also lessens the impact on the environment.

=== Flail mower ===
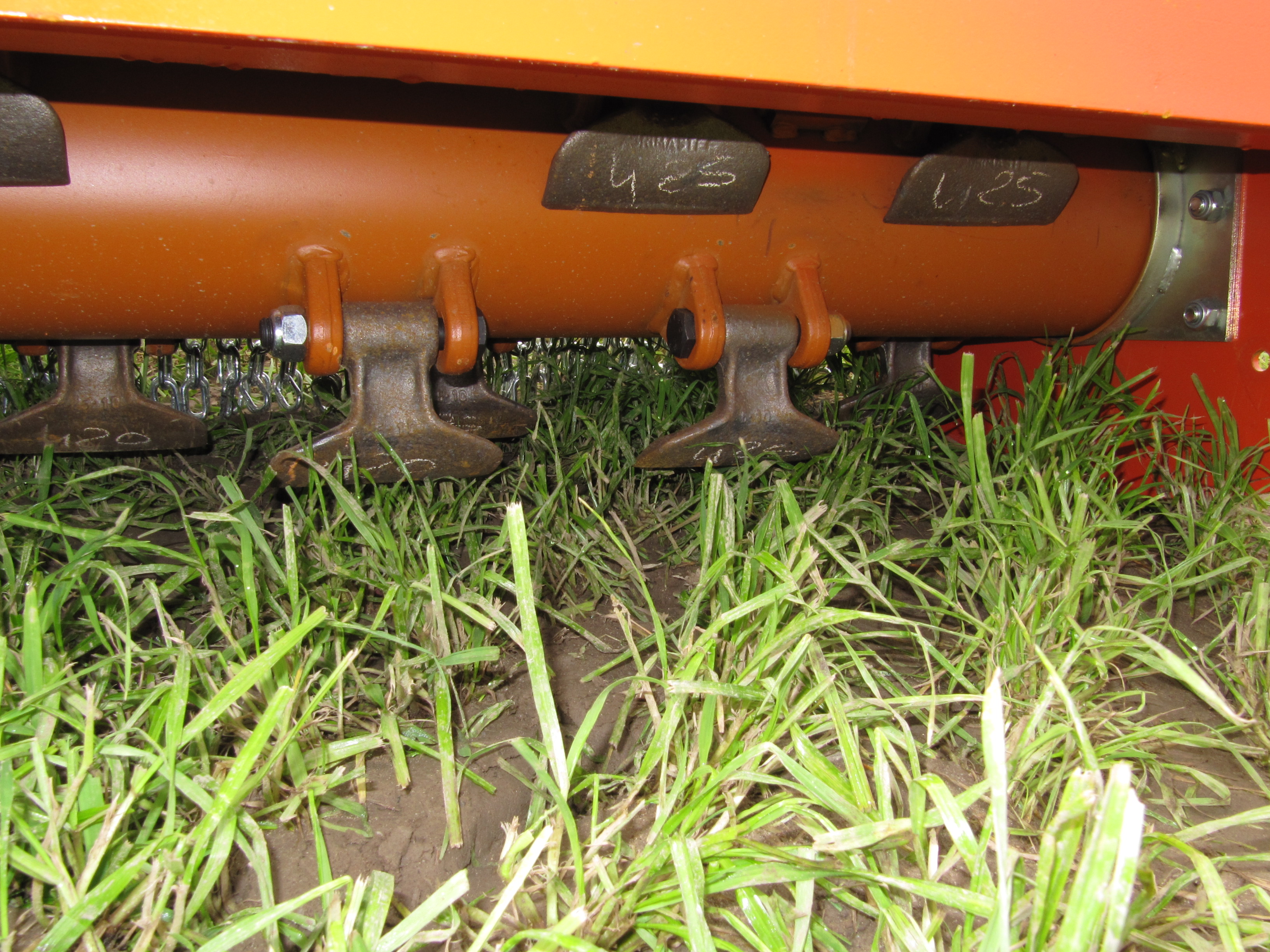
Flail mower

Flail mowers have a number of small blades on the end of chains attached to a horizontal axis. The cutting is carried out by the ax-like heads striking the grass at speed. These types are used on rough ground, where the blades may frequently be fouled by other objects, or on tougher vegetation than grass, such as brush (scrub). Due to the length of the chains and the higher weight of the blades, they are better at cutting thick brush than other mowers, because of the relatively high inertia of the blades. In some types the cut material may be gathered in a collection bin. As a boom mower (see above), a flail mower may be used in an upright position for trimming the sides of hedges, when it is often called a hedge-cutter.

=== Drum mower ===
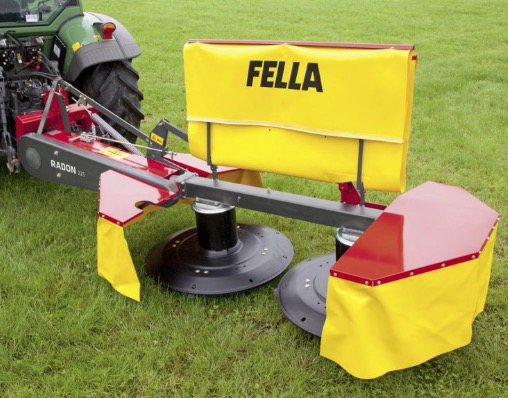
Fella Radon Drum Mower

Drum mowers are known for their simplicity and robustness. They consist of two large drums, each containing three to four spinning blades that chop down the grass or crop as they move over it. This straightforward design makes them easier to maintain, often leading to a longer lifespan.

Drum mowers are particularly effective in tall and dense grass, where their powerful cutting action can make quick work of the task. However, they may struggle on uneven terrain, and their cutting speed may be slower compared to more modern designs. Their affordability and sturdy build make them an attractive option for smaller farms or those working on a budget.

== See also ==
- Aquatic weed harvester
- Groundskeeping
- List of agricultural machinery
- Roller mower
