= Flail mower =

Powered vegetation cutter

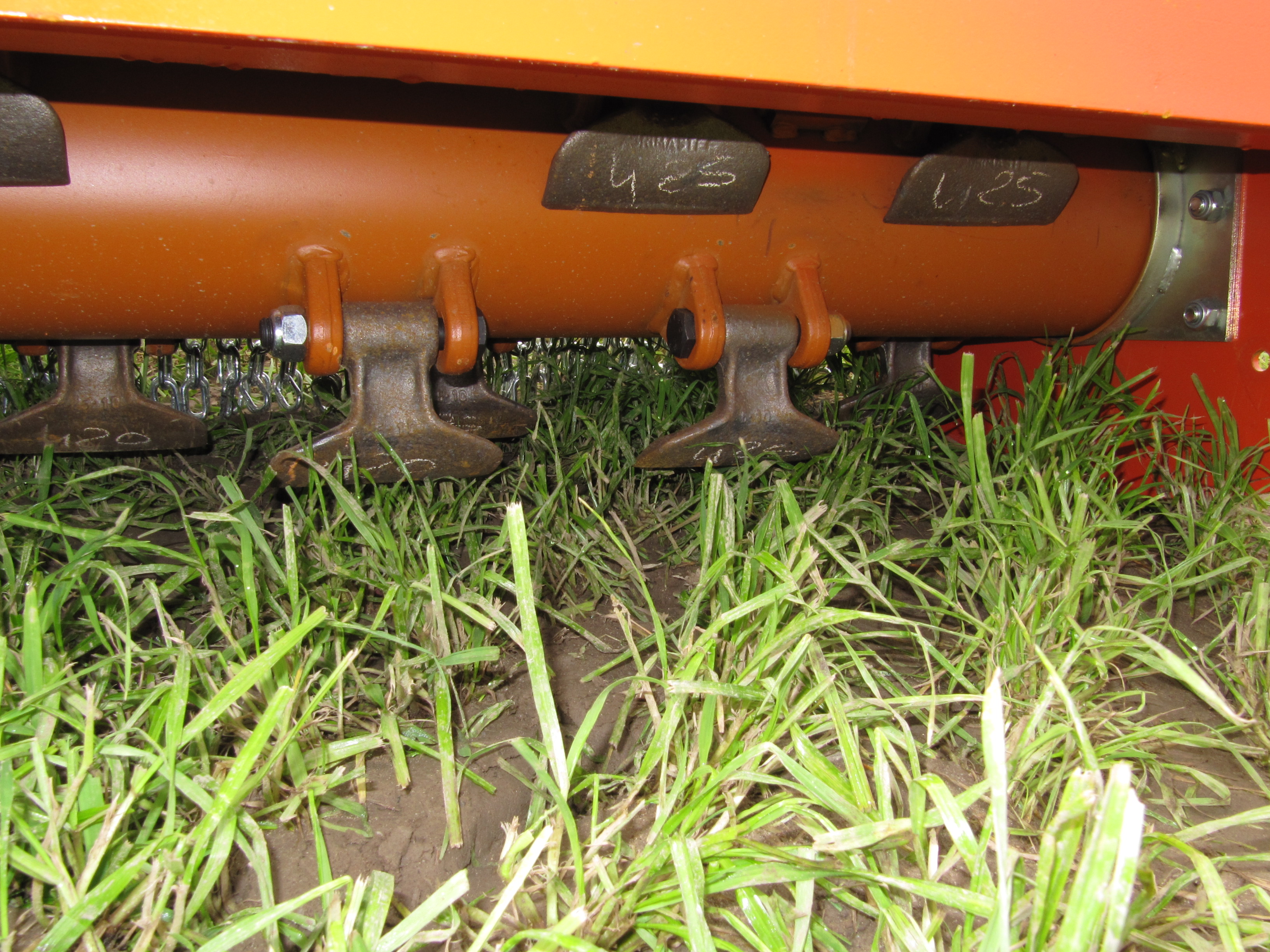
Detail: flails on the rotating drum

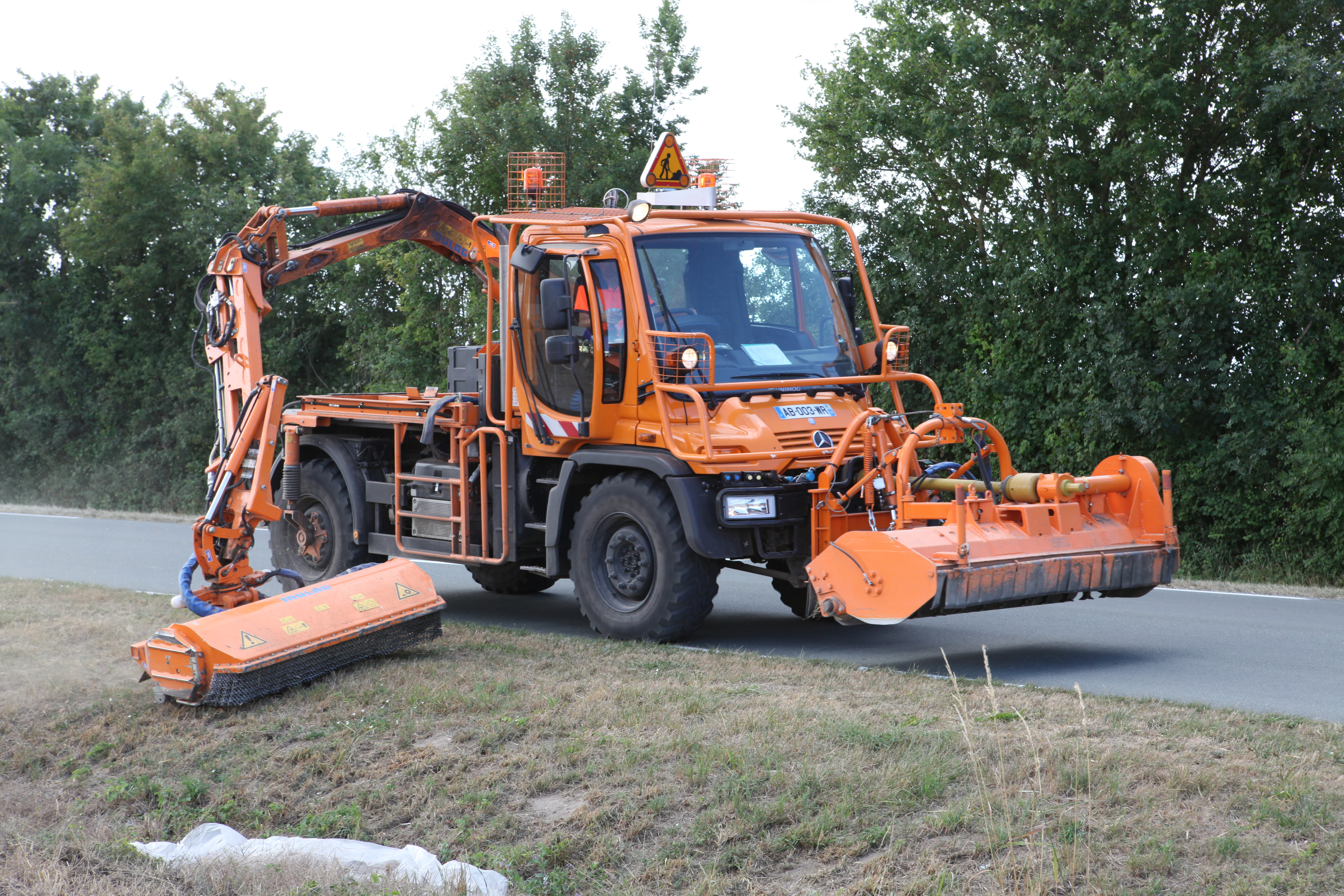
Two mounted on a Unimog, one at the front, and one at the end of a hydraulic boom

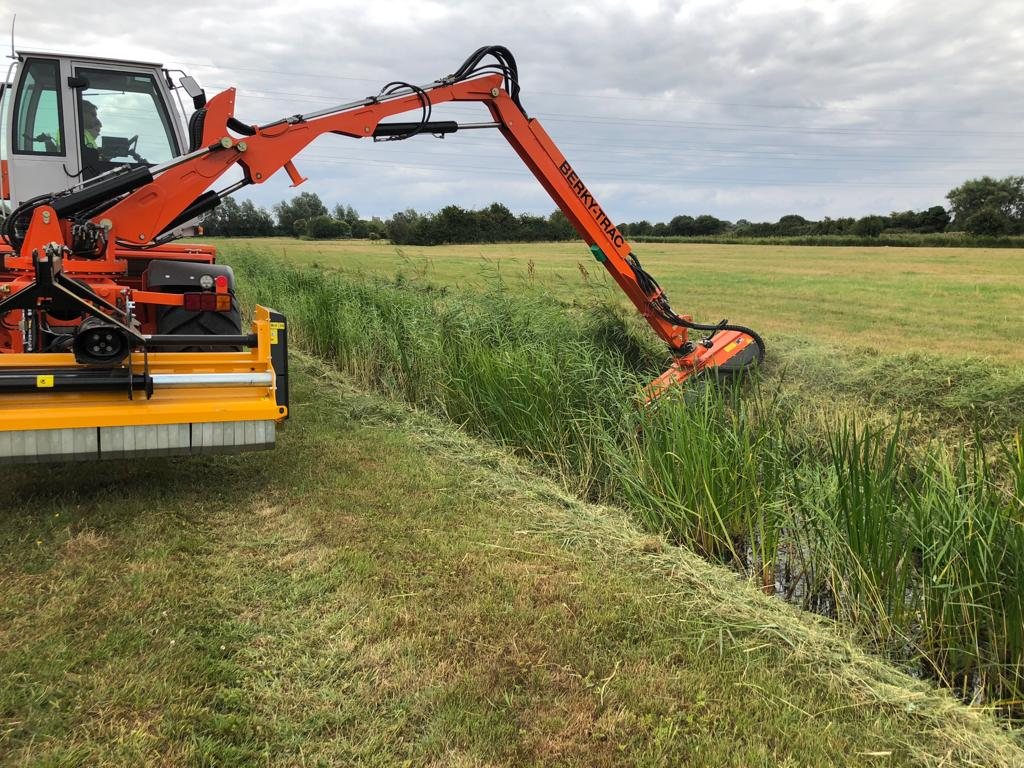
Used for ditch maintenance

A flail mower is a type of powered garden/agricultural equipment which is used to deal with heavier grass/scrub which a normal lawn mower could not cope with. Some smaller models are self-powered, but many are PTO driven implements, which can attach to the three-point hitches found on the rear of most tractors. This type of mower is best used to provide a rough cut to long grass and even brambles in locations such as roadsides, where contact with loose debris may be possible.

The flail mower gets its name from the use of flails attached to its rotating horizontal drum (also called tube, rotor, or axle). Many implement companies also refer to the flails as knives, blades or hammers. The rows of flails are usually staggered to give a continuous cut for reduced wear on the machine. The flails are attached to the drum using chain links or brackets, depending on the manufacturer. The rotating drum is parallel to the axle of the tractor. The PTO driveshaft along the tractor's axis must make a right angle through the use of a gearbox in order to transfer its rotational energy to the drum. As the drum rotates, centrifugal force pushes the flails outward.

Standard flails are shaped like an extruded "T" or "Y" and a chain attaches to the bottom. There are also proprietary flails with various shapes for shredding larger brush and others that leave a smooth, finish cut.

If a flail strikes an immovable object, it simply bounces off. Other rotary type mowers have a tendency to grab and throw the object out of the mower deck if it’s small enough. This fact makes the flail mower best suited for areas where thrown objects would cause damage.

Flail mowers may also be used in a more or less upright position for trimming the sides of hedges. They are often called hedge cutters (or sometimes also hedge trimmers) then. Especially in forestry (agroforestry) some very robust variants of flail mowers – called flail mulchers, flail shredders, or flail choppers – are used.

== Flail mowers versus toppers ==
Some might also confuse flail mowers with toppers. Flail mowers cut grass very short and fine and can handle rough uneven surfaces, where a topper is mostly used to top off growth such as weeds and long grass. The mulch is much larger in sizes and not as fine when cutting with a flail mower. The topper uses swinging blades instead of rotating blades. Flail mowers are much more versatile in use but do cost more.
