= Swisher Ride King =

Riding lawn mower model

Overview
- Manufacturer: Swisher INC.
- Also called: Big Mow R32 (Single speed models) A32 (Two speed models)
- Production: 1955-2003 • 2017-2020
- Assembly: Warrensburg, Missouri
- Designer: Max B. Swisher

Powertrain
- Engine: Lauson V55 5.5hp (1949-1959) Tecumseh V60 6HP (1959-1985) Briggs & Stratton Power Built 8HP (1985-2003) Briggs & Stratton Power Built 10.5HP (2017-2020)
- Hybrid drivetrain: FWD, rear wheel assist (Lauson powered models only) "Vari-Speed" Belt/Chain combination drive (similar in function to a CVT) Single Speed Belt/Chain combination drive 2-speed Belt/Chain combination drive

The Swisher Ride King and its sister model the Big Mow were a line of three-wheeled, front wheel drive, zero turn lawn mowers made by Swisher Inc.

The Ride King, among being one of the first practical riding mowers, is widely regarded as the world's first zero turn mower, despite not originally being marketed as such.

== Origins of Swisher ==
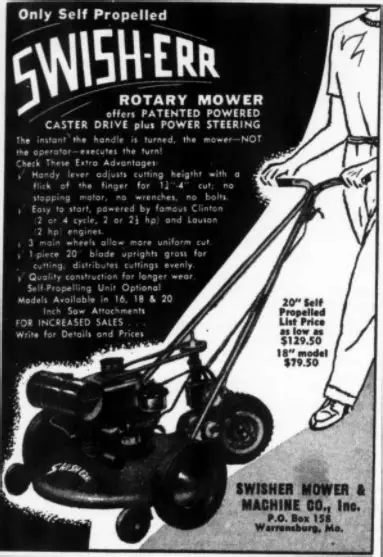
Advertisement or the Swisher Rotary Mower, late 1954.

Max B. Swisher was born April 19, 1928, on a farm in Warrensburg, Missouri. He grew up during the Great Depression, though he was able to graduate high school and obtain an associate degree. He began tinkering with mowing equipment in mid 1945, where he invented a self-propelled, zero turn, push mower known as the Rotary Mower in his family's chicken coop. From these ideas, Max founded Swisher Mower and Machine (Stylized as SWISH-ERR) in 1945 and began marketing his inventions.

== History ==
=== 1949-1951: The invention ===
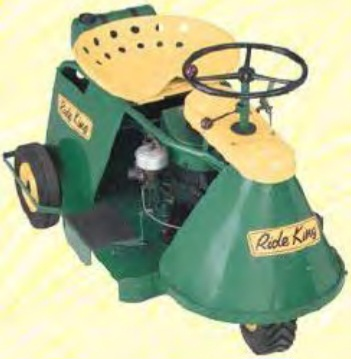
Pre-production Ride King

Max Swisher created the first Ride King prototype in early 1949. Though the idea was revolutionary, Swisher did not have the means of mass-production, so many of these pre-production models were relegated to local sales as well as further testing and refinement.

=== 1952-1954: Production ===
In August 1952, Max incorporated Swisher Mower and Machine and moved into a defunct meat-packing plant in Warrensberg and repurposed it for mower production. The production of the Rotary Mower began in late 1954 and the R32 Ride King in early 1955. With its lower priced Big Mow following shortly after.

A rough patent was filed by Swisher April 15, 1956 and was granted March 31, 1959.

=== 1955-1973 "Gen I" ===
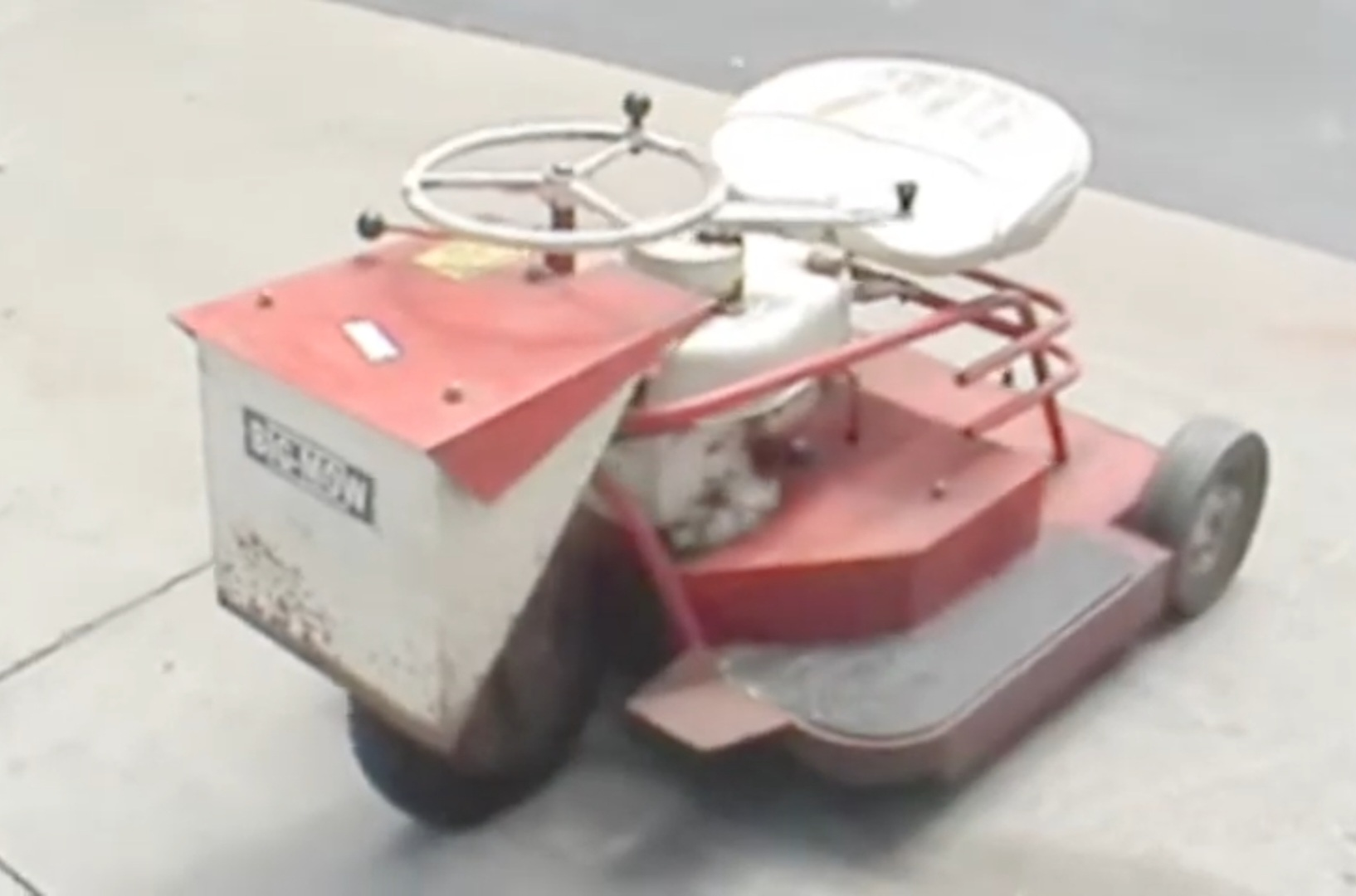
1959-68 Big Mow. Note the different cowling compared to the cover image.

The Ride King and Big Mow hit the market near simultaneously, with the factory codes R32-B and R32-A, respectively. The main difference between the two is the hood, with the Big Mow having a flat, standard hood and the Ride King having a stylized, pointed hood.

These early mowers are equipped with a Lauson V55 5.5 hp engine with a cable pull starter. The Ride King could be equipped with rear wheel assist, which drove the rear wheels using the blade pulley. The fuel tank was incorporated into the flywheel cover and held approximately half a gallon of gas. These models had a single speed (later known as the vari-speed) clutch operated belt-driven gearbox, which in turn spun the front wheel. The steering wheel was mounted at 90° and turned the single front wheel, which combined with its front-wheel propulsion, have the operator the ability to pivot 360°. To reverse, the operator simply turned the front wheel backwards and accelerated.

The mower was originally priced at around $325 and was initially met with fanfare and a general positive public opinion, as, up to this point, there had been no other mower this large or maneuverable available to the wider public. Combined with a unique, eye-catching design and the post-WWII boom in the American economy, sales climbed quickly in the 1960s.

In 1957, Tecumseh bought Lauson and began phasing the V55 out. After 1959, all mowers were equipped with the new Tecumseh V60 6 hp. These engines were equipped with the notorious crank start handle. With the addition of the higher-powered engine, the rear-wheel assist was discontinued.

In 1968, several mid-generation changes were made to the mowers. The unreliable crank start system began to be phased out for a conventional pull chord, a feature that the Ride King would keep until the end of production. Swisher also introduced the two-speed model, which allowed you to have much greater speed control while mowing.

=== 1974-1996 "Gen II" ===
1974 brought a major redesign for the Ride King and the Big Mow. The Tecumseh V60 was retained, but the fuel tank was relocated to the hood, now holding slightly less than a gallon. The all metal "tractor seat" of the first generation was replaced with a black and white padded square seat with two shock absorbers underneath, greatly improving ride quality. The first generation's solid rubber wheels were also replaced with pneumatic tires to further enhance comfort.

The "vari-speed" drive is introduced, eliminating the need for a clutch lever. Instead, the operator would depress a pedal with their right foot, the speed correlating with how hard the pedal is pressed. The option of a sweeper was now available, along with a catcher box, though these models are exceedingly rare.

Around 1978, the option of a 12 volt electric starter was added to the Ride King, though the pull cord was installed regardless. This added the need for a battery, as opposed to earlier mowers using a magneto. The Big Mow would not get the option until 1985.

In 1982, the Ride King's outdated Tecumseh was replaced by the 8 hp Briggs & Stratton Power Built. Almost all Briggs equipped Ride Kings came with an electric starter. The Big Mow would not use the Briggs engine until 1985. The black and white seat was replaced by solid black upholstery and the white lower cowling was painted red with black pinstriping. The Ride King and Big Mow were now practically indistinguishable besides the hood graphic.

In 1987, with the passing of the Mower Safety Act by the CPSC, all mowers, including the Ride King and Big Mow, must have seat, clutch, and blade safety switches.

In the early 1990s, where in sharp decline due to heavy competition from brands like Toro, Dixon, and Scag. In 1992, a new Ride King was $600, which, adjusted for inflation, was almost a third of their 1950s price.

=== 1997-2003 "Gen III" ===
Information for this section gathered from the owner's manual.

The year 1997 brought the final iteration of the original zero turn. By this time, Swisher was moving to more profitable ventures, such as pull behind, rough and finish cut mowers and it was evident that the Ride King was nearing its end. The third generation was the final attempt to revitalize the Ride King.

These "Plastic Hood" mowers were significantly different and more advanced than their predecessors. These mowers sport a plastic hood (fiberglass for 1997 only) holding a 2-gallon plastic fuel tank. The rear wheels were made the same size as the front and the rear axle was made separate from the body, allowing cutting height adjustment via a hand crank.

The seat was swapped from the older, vinyl upholstery to a more modern, high-back construction. "Anti-scalp" rollers were added to the front corners of the deck to prevent the mower from tipping, which may scalp the lawn and lead to an uneven cut. There was also a mulcher option, allowing for an adjustable grass chute.

These efforts would prove fruitless, as declining sales and increasing EPA regulations led to the quiet discontinuation of the Ride King and Big Mow in 2003.

== Modern revival ==
=== 2017-2020 "Gen IV" ===
Information for this section gathered at Lowe's.com.

In early 2017, Swisher INC announced that they would be re-introducing the Ride King as a novelty and tribute to the original zero turn. This mower was sold by Swisher primarily through the Lowe's website with a retail price of $3,100-$3,800 depending on retail location and emissions requirements from state to state. Due to profoundly low sales, the COVID-19 pandemic, and the design simply outliving its usefulness, Swisher phased the Ride King out of production around late 2020.

== Rebadges ==
While the Ride King was often sold directly by Swisher or through Tractor Supply, it was also sold by Gambles as the "Big Ride". These are identifiable by a lime green color scheme.

There are also images of dark blue plastic hood Big Mows, though it is unclear if these are rebrands or if they are painted by their owners.

== Swisher warehouse fire ==
Some years ago, after Swisher had relocated modern production to a different building in 1999, a fire broke out in the original warehouse and office building, destroying many original documents regarding the Ride King. Much of the gathered information has been accumulated via buyer memory and testimony, forums, and phone calls with Swisher INC.
