= Riding mower =

Lawn mower on which the operator is seated

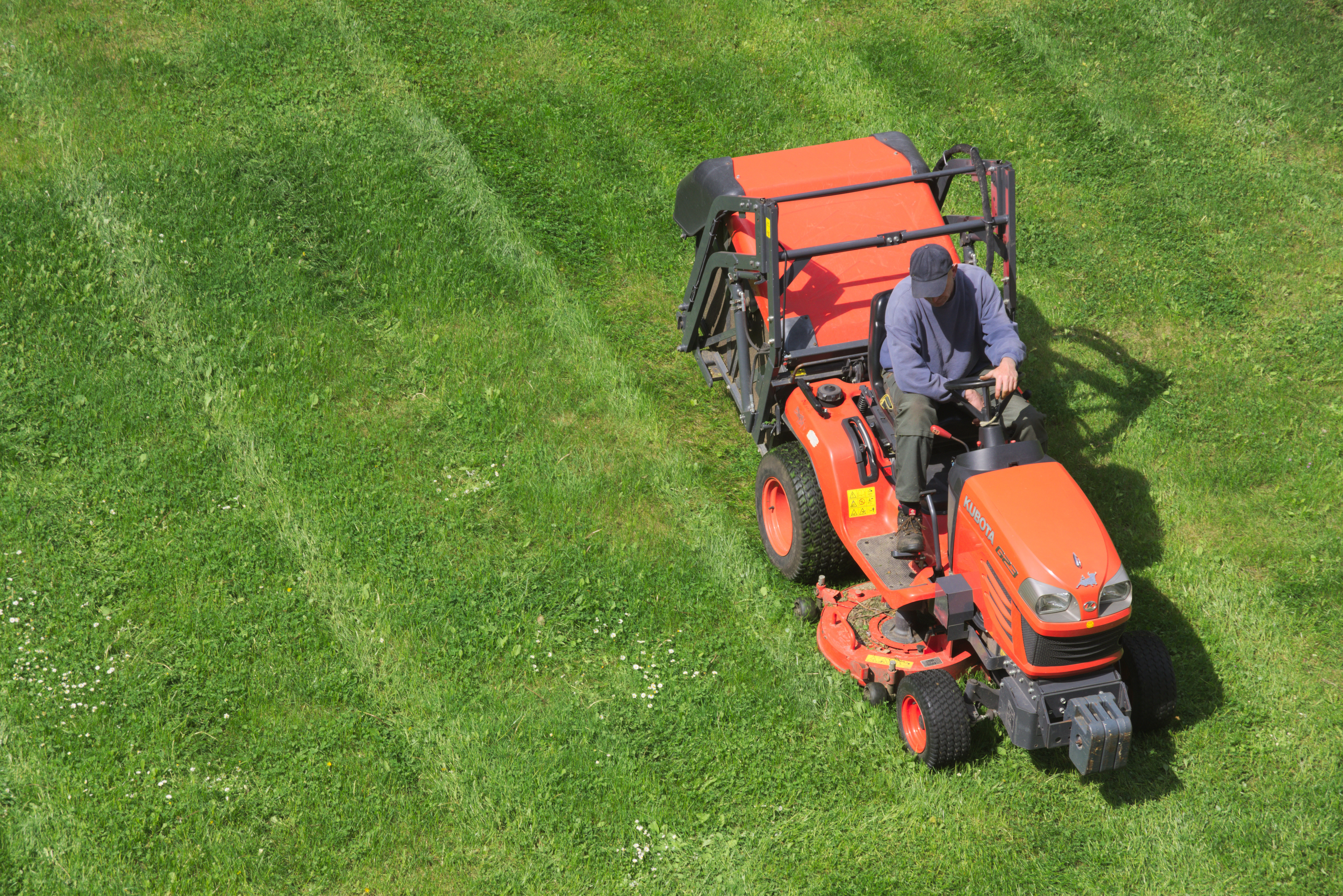
A riding mower in use on the grounds of Belvedere on the Pfingstberg palace in Potsdam, Germany

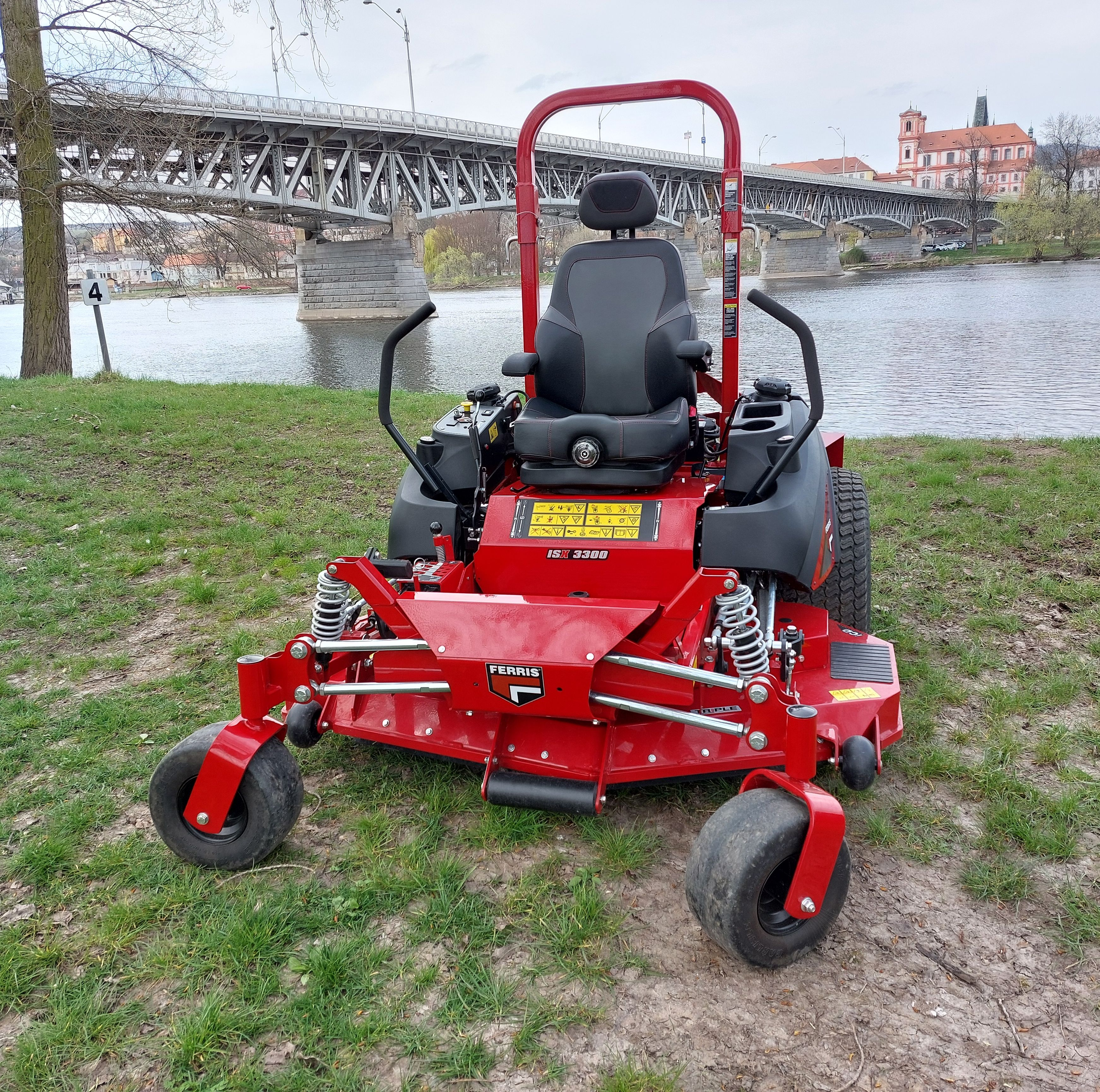
A typical zero-turn mower. The front wheels are swivel casters. Each handlebar operates the rear wheel on the same side (left or right) for direction, speed, and braking; the net effect is somewhat comparable to skidsteer maneuvering.

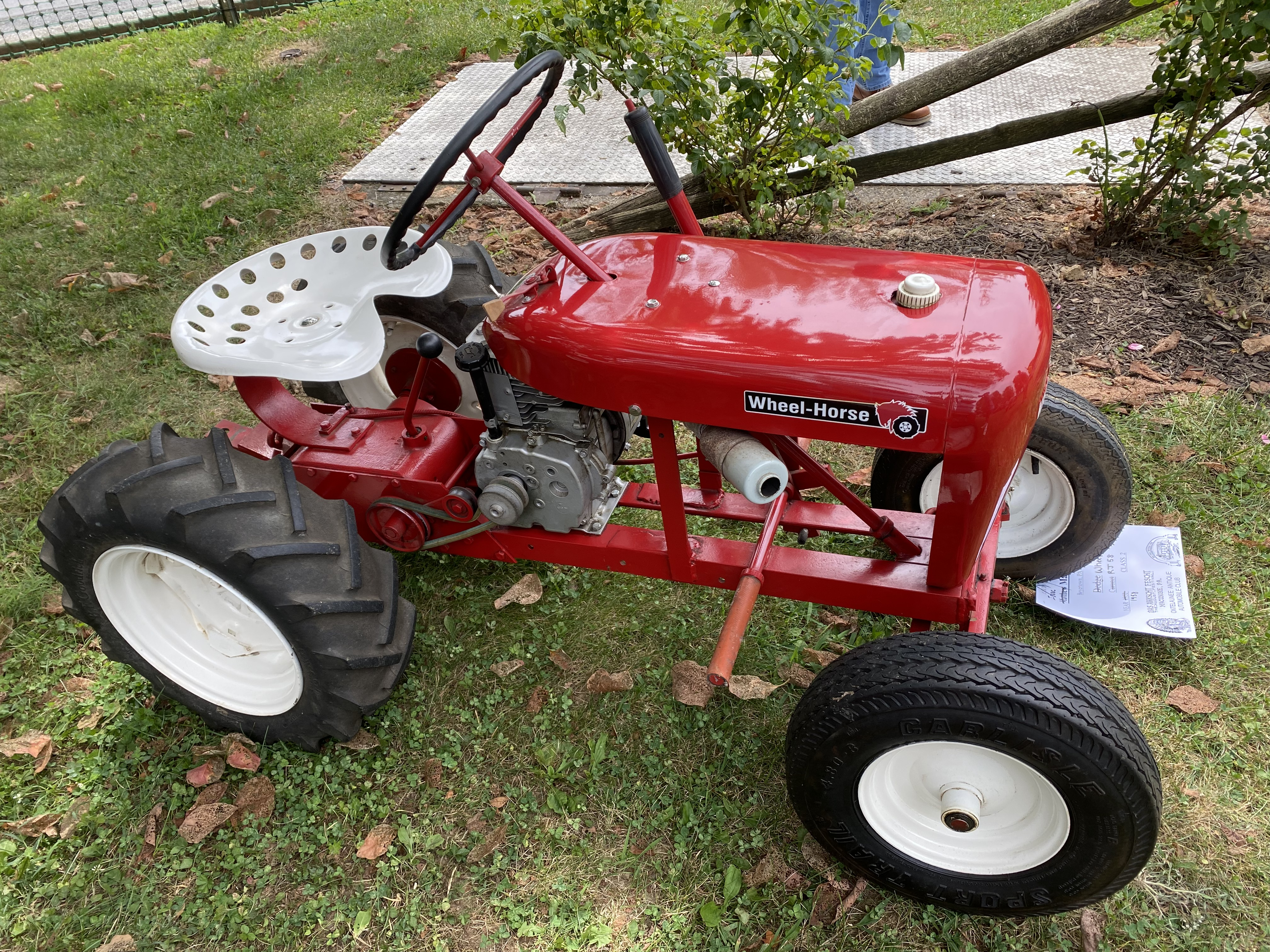
An early Wheel Horse lawn tractor. A mower deck was available. Eventually most such machines (from many brands) became principally mowing and snowplowing machines and only secondarily tillage machines.

A riding mower, also known as a ride-on mower, is a type of lawn mower on which the operator is seated, unlike mowers which are pushed or towed.

Riding mowers, which sometimes resemble small tractors and are in such cases called tractor mowers or lawn tractors, are larger than push mowers and are suitable for large lawns, although commercial riding lawn mowers (such as zero-turn mowers) can be "stand-on" types, and often bear little resemblance to residential lawn tractors, being designed to mow large areas at high speed in the shortest time possible.

Persons using a mower should wear heavy footwear, eye protection, and hearing protection in the case of engine-powered mowers.

The American Academy of Pediatrics recommends that children be at least 12 years old before they are allowed to use a walk-behind lawn mower and at least 16 years of age before using a riding mower. They also should demonstrate proper judgement and maturity.

Most commonly, riding mowers use gasoline engines rather than electricity as a source of energy, though some companies have begun to produce models that are fully electric.

== History ==
In 1954, Cecil Elwood Pond introduced his first 4-wheel lawn tractor, an event which altered substantially the lawn care manufacturing business. By 1957, his Wheel Horse Products company recorded sales over $1 million (US$10,848,341 in 2023 dollars) for the first time. Two years later, the company's sales more than doubled, to $4.5 million (US$47,034,247 in 2023 dollars).
