= Grasscycling =

Lawn mowing technique

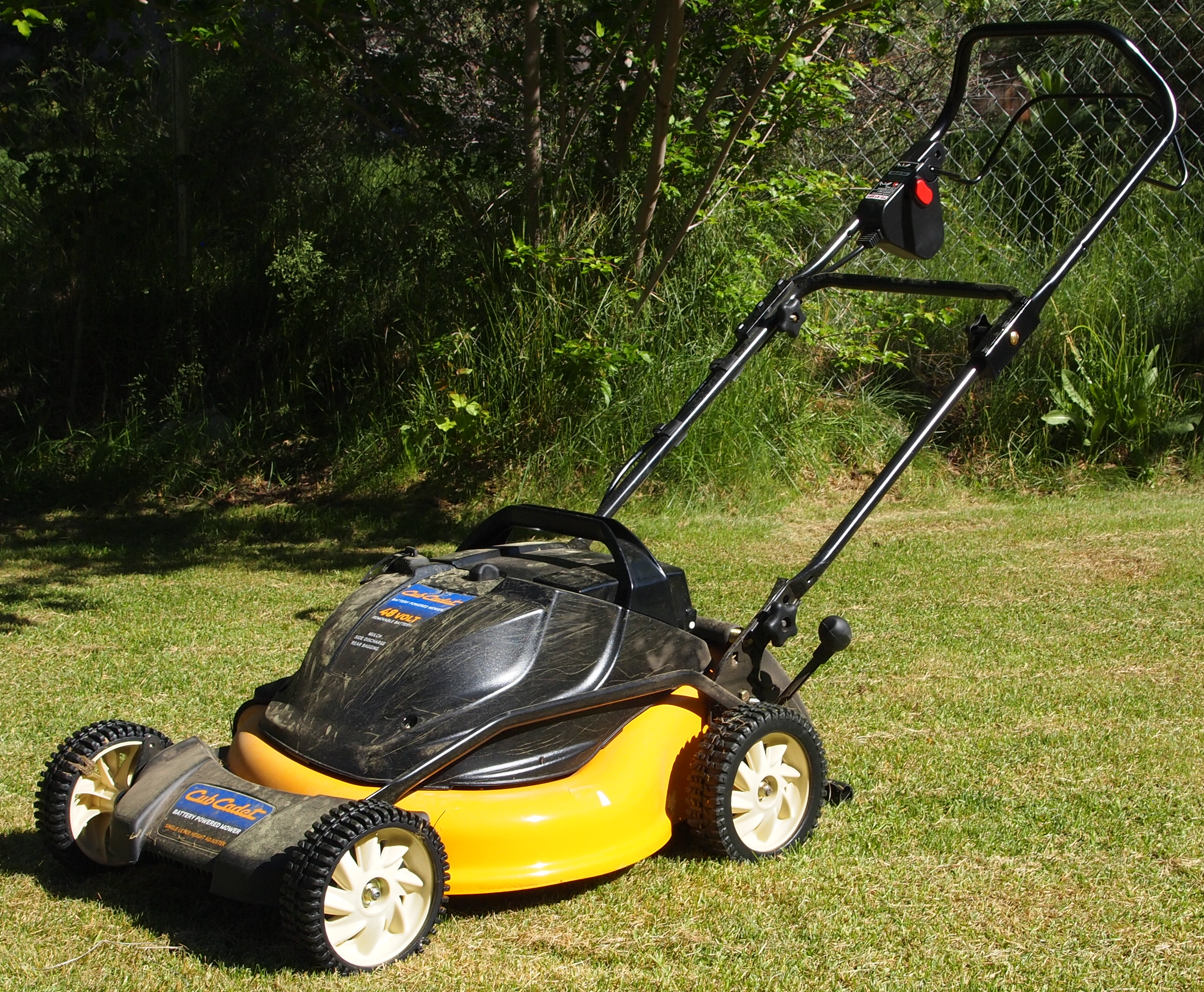
Electric lawn mower in grass-cycling mode

Grasscycling is a method of handling grass clippings by leaving them to decompose on the lawn when mowing. The term combines "grass" and "recycling", and had come into use by at least 1990, as part of the push to reduce the huge quantities of clippings going into landfills, up to half of some cities' summertime waste flow, as 1,000 square feet (93 m^{2}) of lawn can produce 200 to 500 pounds (90 to 225 kg) of clippings a year.

Because grass consists largely of water (80% or more), contains little lignin, and has high nitrogen content, grass clippings easily break down during an aerobic process (comparable to composting) and returns the decomposed clippings to the soil within one to two weeks, acting primarily as a fertilizer supplement and, to a much smaller degree, a mulch. Grass cycling can provide 15 to 20% or more of a lawn's yearly nitrogen requirements. Proponents also note that grasscycling reduces the use of plastic bags for collecting yard waste and reduces trips to the curb or landfill to haul waste.

== Techniques ==
Optimal grasscycle techniques include:

- Cutting no more than 1/3 the length of the grass, this means when lawns are growing fast, mowing about twice a week.
- Cutting when the grass is dry to the touch
- Cutting when the height is between 3 and 4 inches (7 to 10 cm), once per week.
- Ensuring that the mower blade is sharp

Although a mulching mower can make grass clippings smaller, one is not necessary for grasscycling.

== See also ==
- Compost
- Recycling
