= Lawn mower =

Grass-cutting device

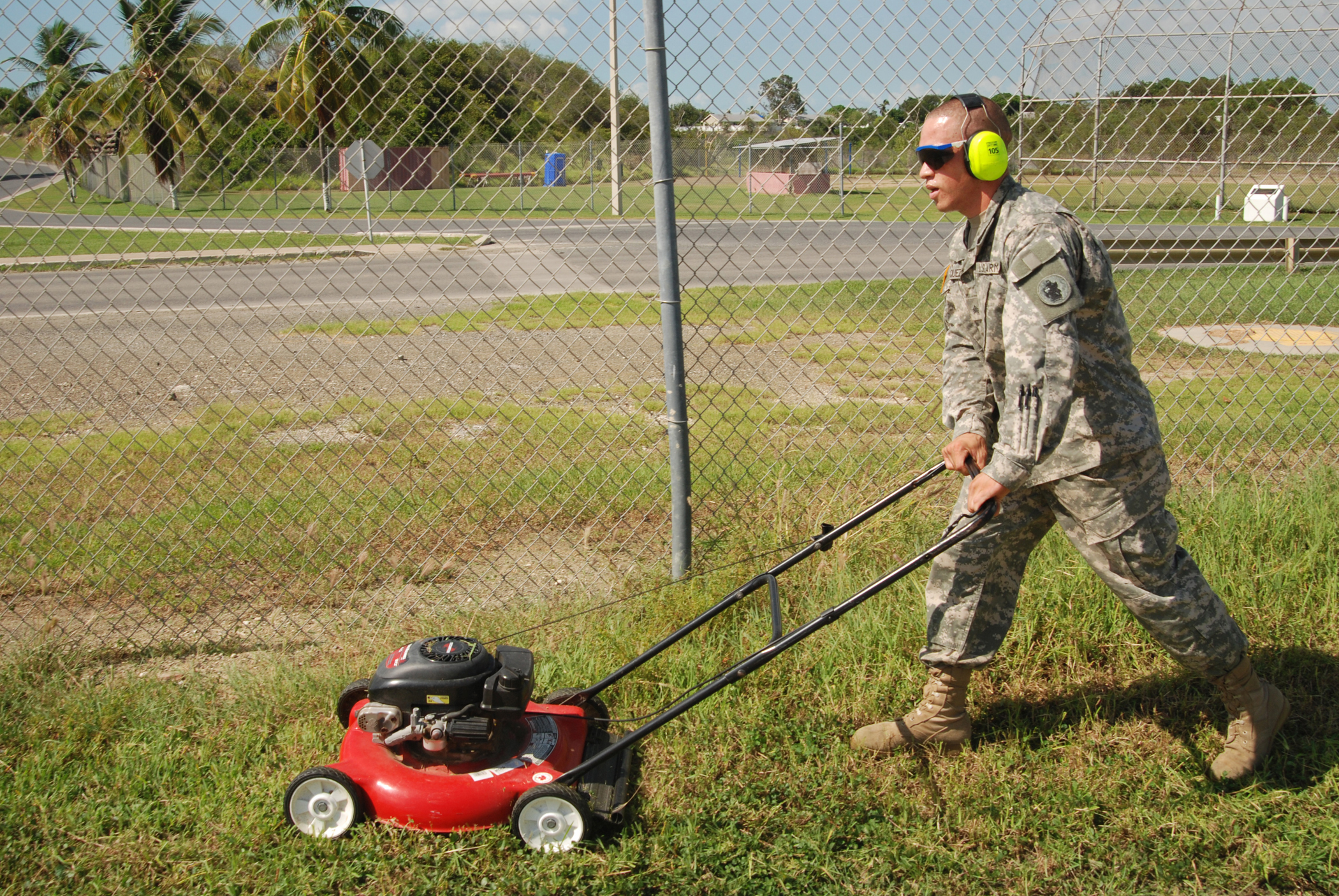
A typical modern gasoline/petrol-powered rotary "push mower" with self-powered cutting blades still requires human power to move it across the ground and guide it. Mowers of the type displayed usually vary in width from 20 to 24 inches (51 to 61 cm).

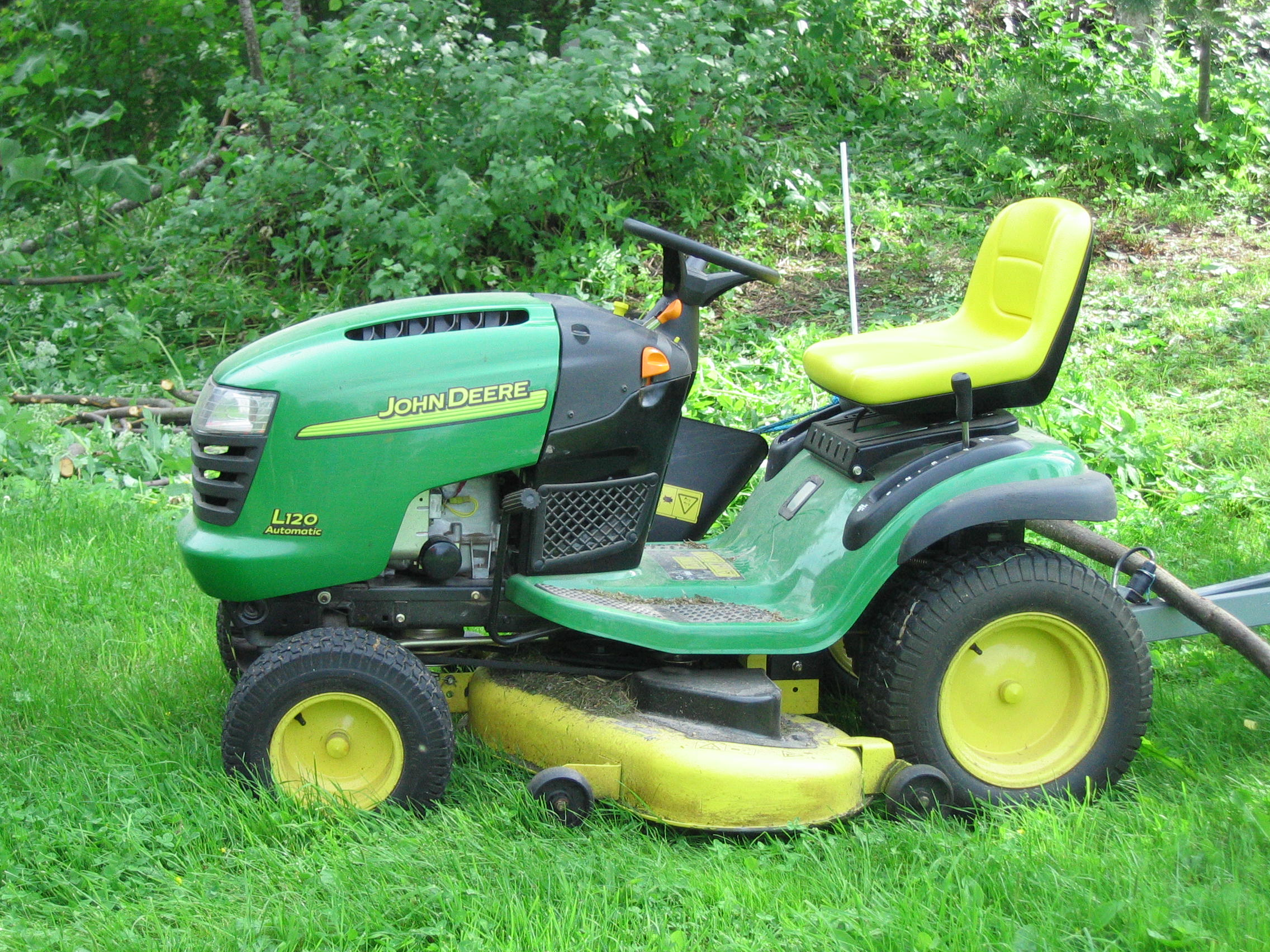
A residential riding or "ride-on" mower

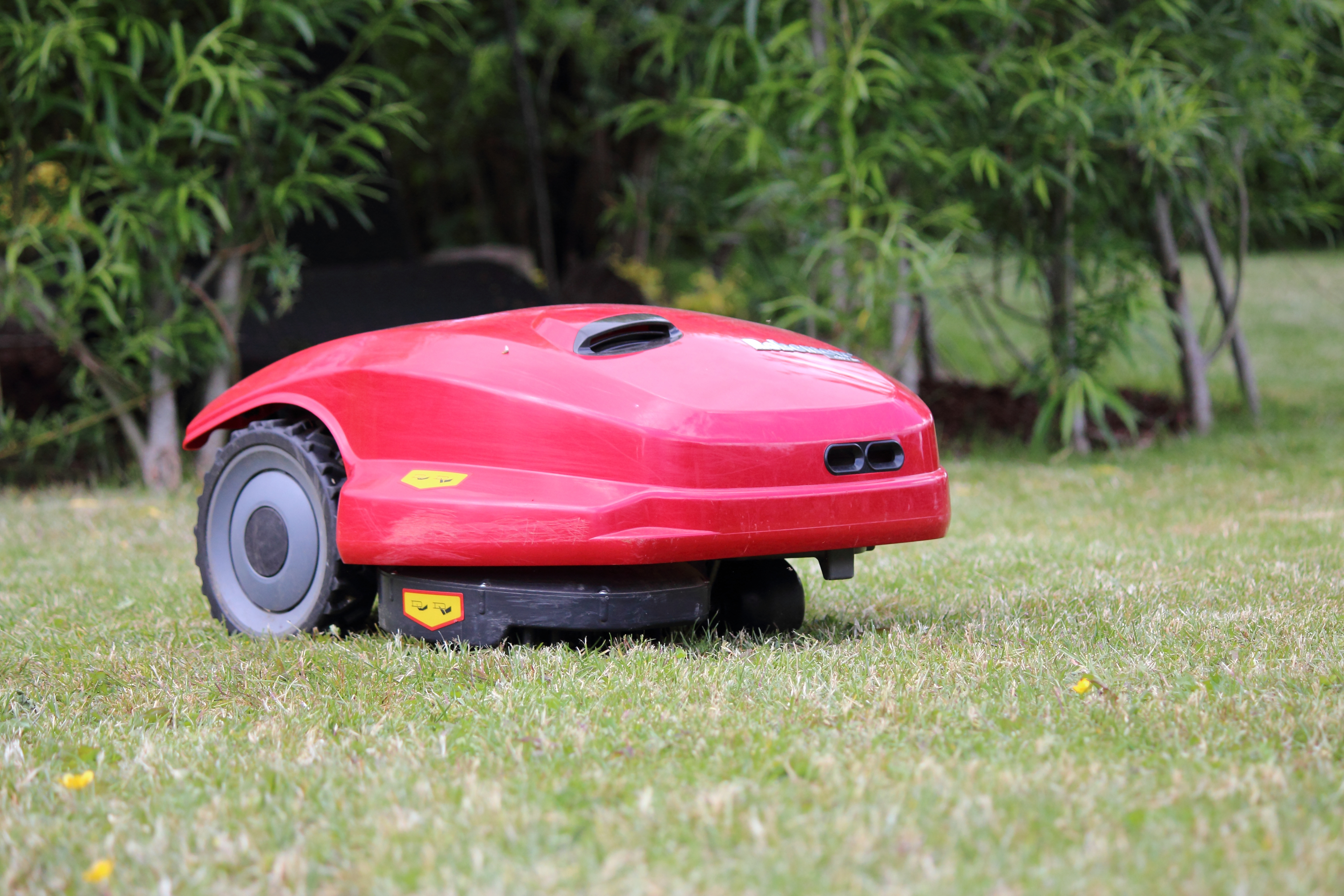
A battery-powered robotic lawn mower

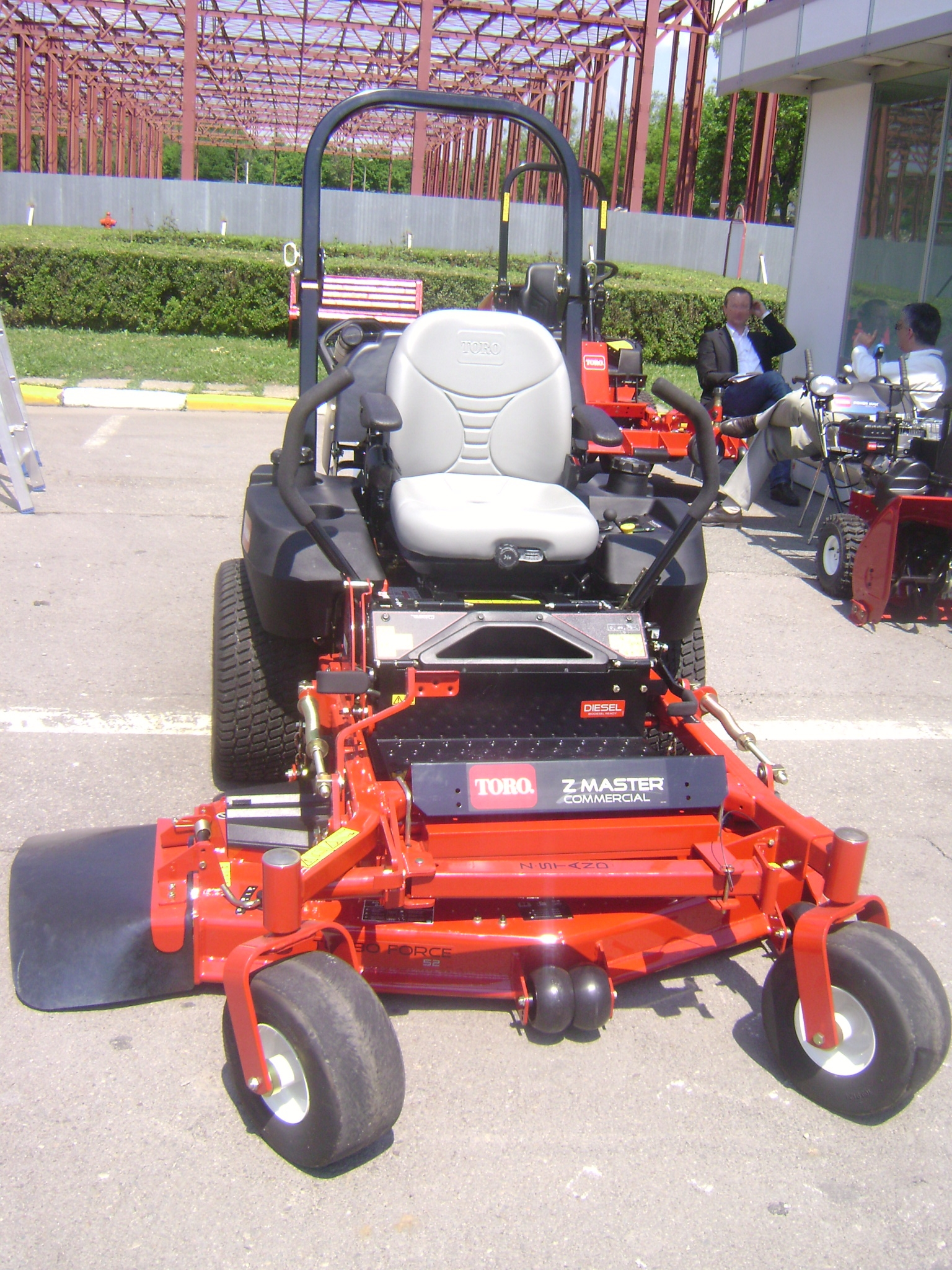
A commercial zero-turn mower

A lawn mower (also known as a grass cutter or simply mower, also often spelled lawnmower) is a device utilizing one or more revolving blades (or a reel) to cut a grass surface to an even height. The height of the cut grass may be fixed by the mower's design but generally is adjustable by the operator, typically by a single master lever or by a mechanism on each of the machine's wheels. The blades may be powered by manual force, with wheels mechanically connected to the cutting blades so that the blades spin when the mower is pushed forward, or the machine may have a battery-powered or plug-in electric motor. The most common self-contained power source for lawn mowers is a small 4-stroke (typically one-cylinder) internal combustion engine. Smaller mowers often lack any form of self-propulsion, requiring human power to move over a surface; "walk-behind" mowers are self-propelled, requiring a human only to walk behind and guide them. Larger lawn mowers are usually either self-propelled "walk-behind" types or, more often, are "ride-on" mowers that the operator can sit on and control. A robotic lawn mower ("lawn-mowing bot", "mowbot", etc.) is designed to operate either entirely on its own or less commonly by an operator on a remote control.

Two main styles of blades are used in lawn mowers. Lawn mowers employing a single blade that rotates about a single vertical axis are known as rotary mowers, while those employing a cutting bar and multiple blade assembly that rotates about a single horizontal axis are known as cylinder or reel mowers (although in some versions, the cutting bar is the only blade, and the rotating assembly consists of flat metal pieces which force the blades of grass against the sharp cutting bar).

There are several types of mowers, each suited to a particular scale and purpose. The smallest types, non-powered push mowers, are suitable for small residential lawns and gardens. Electrical or piston engine-powered push mowers are used for larger residential lawns (although there is some overlap). Riding mowers, which sometimes resemble small tractors, are larger than push mowers and are suitable for large lawns. However, commercial riding lawn mowers (such as zero-turn mowers) can be "stand-on" types and often bear little resemblance to residential lawn tractors, being designed to mow large areas at high speed in the shortest time possible. The largest multi-gang (multi-blade) mowers are mounted on tractors and are designed for large expanses of grass such as golf courses and municipal parks, although they are ill-suited for complex terrain.

== History ==
=== Invention ===
The lawn mower was invented in 1830 by Edwin Beard Budding of Stroud, Gloucestershire, England. Budding's mower was designed primarily to cut the grass on sports grounds and extensive gardens, as a superior alternative to the scythe, and was granted a British patent on 31 August 1830.

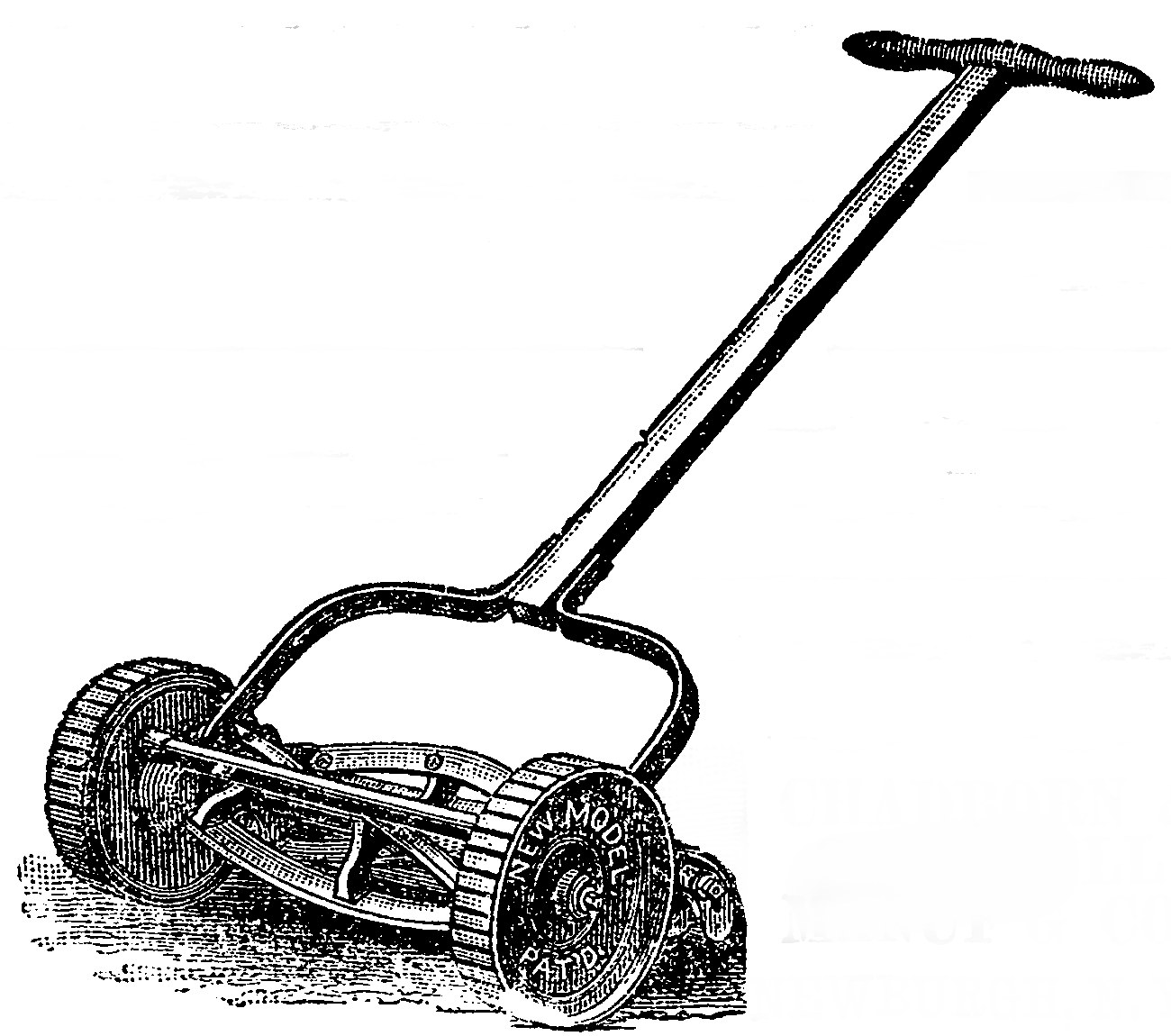
An early cylinder (reel) mower, showing a fixed cutting blade in front of the rear roller and wheel-driven rotary blades

Budding's first machine was 19 inches (480 mm) wide with a frame made of wrought iron. The mower was pushed from behind. Cast-iron gear wheels transmitted power from the rear roller to the cutting cylinder, allowing the rear roller to drive the knives on the cutting cylinder; the ratio was 16:1. Another roller placed between the cutting cylinder and the main or land roller could be raised or lowered to alter the height of cut. The grass clippings were hurled forward into a tray-like box. It was soon realized, however, that an extra handle was needed in front to help pull the machine along. Overall, these machines were remarkably similar to modern mowers.

Two of the earliest Budding machines sold went to Regent's Park Zoological Gardens in London and the Oxford colleges. In an agreement between John Ferrabee and Edwin Budding dated 18 May 1830, Ferrabee paid the costs of enlarging the small blades, obtained letters of patent and acquired rights to manufacture, sell and license other manufacturers in the production of lawn mowers. Without patent, Budding and Ferrabee were shrewd enough to allow other companies to build copies of their mower under licence, the most successful of these being Ransomes of Ipswich, which began making mowers as early as 1832.

His machine was the catalyst for the preparation of modern-style sporting ovals, playing fields (pitches), grass courts, etc. This led to the codification of modern rules for many sports, including for football, lawn bowls, lawn tennis and others.

=== Further improvements ===
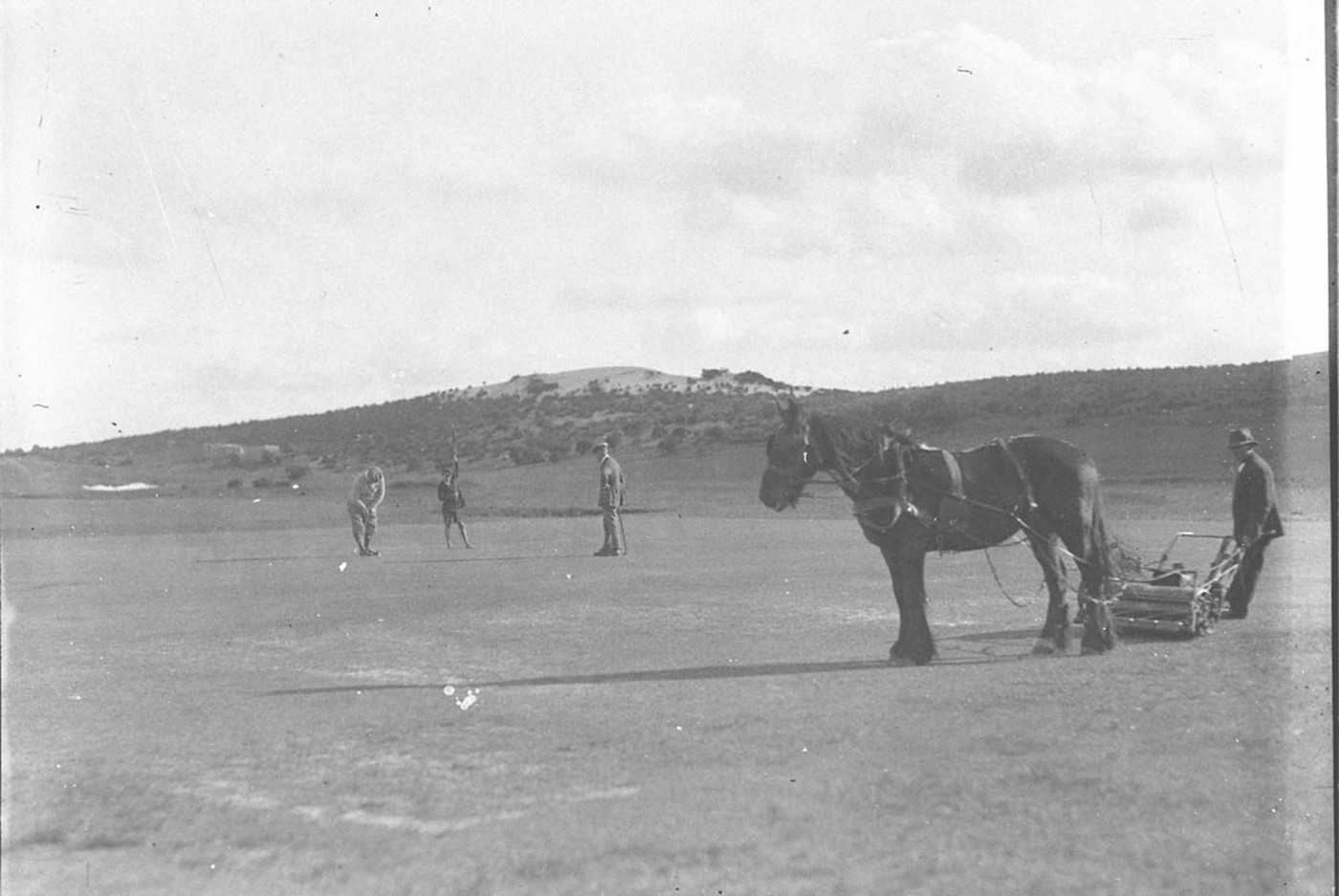
A horsedrawn lawn mower on an Australian golf course in the 1930s

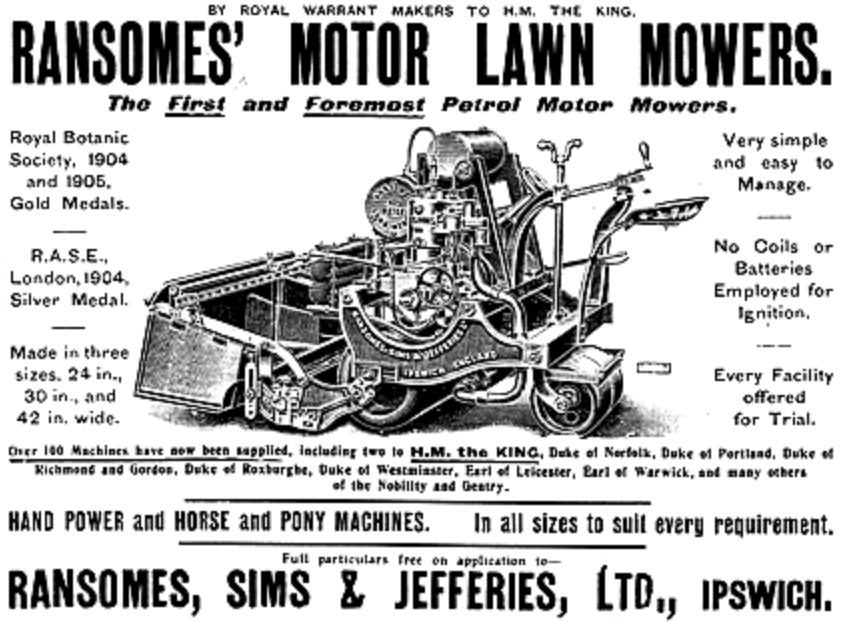
The first gasoline-powered lawn mower, 1902

It took ten more years and further innovations to create a machine that could be drawn by animals, and sixty years before a steam-powered lawn mower was built. In the 1850s, Thomas Green & Son of Leeds introduced a mower called the Silens Messor (meaning silent cutter), which used a chain drive to transmit power from the rear roller to the cutting cylinder. These machines were lighter and quieter than the gear-driven machines that preceded them, although they were slightly more expensive. The rise in popularity of lawn sports helped prompt the spread of the invention. Lawn mowers became a more efficient alternative to the scythe and domesticated grazing animals.

Manufacture of lawn mowers took off in the 1860s. By 1862, Ferrabee's company was making eight models in various roller sizes. He manufactured over 5000 machines until production ceased in 1863. The first grass boxes were flat trays but took their present shape in the 1860s. James Sumner of Lancashire patented the first steam-powered lawn mower in 1893. His machine burned petrol and/or paraffin (kerosene) as fuel. These were heavy machines that took several hours to warm up to operating pressure. After numerous advances, these machines were sold by the Stott Fertilizer and Insecticide Company of Manchester and Sumner. The company they both controlled was called the Leyland Steam Motor Company.

Around 1900, one of the best known English machines was the Ransomes' Automaton, available in chain- or gear-driven models. Numerous manufacturers entered the field with petrol (gasoline) engine-powered mowers after the start of the 20th century. In 1902, the first was produced by Ransomes. JP Engineering of Leicester, founded after World War I, produced a range of very popular chain-driven mowers. About this time, an operator could ride behind animals that pulled the large machines. These were the first riding mowers.

The first United States patent for a reel lawn mower was granted to Amariah Hills on 12 January 1868. In 1870, Elwood McGuire of Richmond, Indiana, designed a human-pushed lawn mower, which was very lightweight and a commercial success. John Burr patented an improved rotary-blade lawn mower in 1899, with the wheel placement altered for better performance. Amariah Hills went on to found the Archimedean Lawn Mower Co. in 1871.

In the United States, gasoline-powered lawn mowers were first manufactured in 1914 by Ideal Power Mower Co. of Lansing, Michigan, based on a patent by Ransom E. Olds. Ideal Power Mower also introduced the world's first self-propelled, riding lawn tractor in 1922, known as the "Triplex". The roller-drive lawn mower has changed very little since around 1930. Gang mowers, those with multiple sets of blades to cut a wider swath, were built in the United States in 1919 by the Worthington Mower Company.

=== Atco Ltd ===
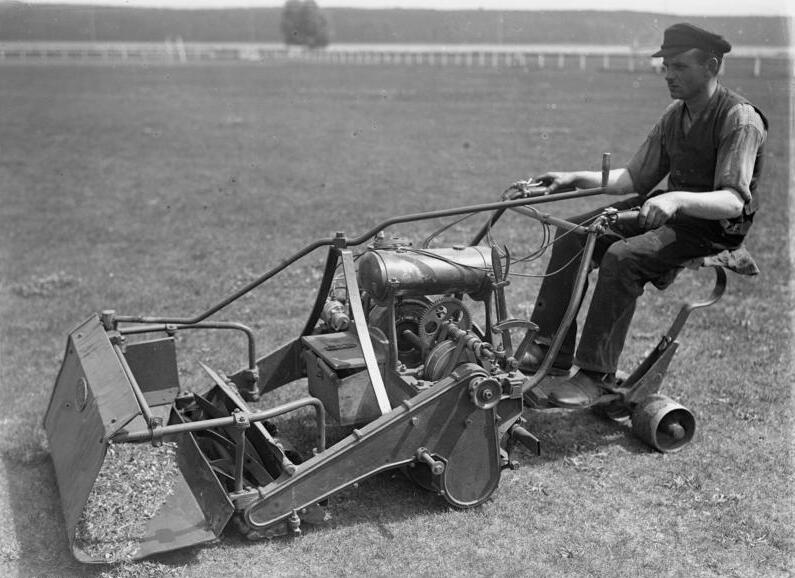
Commercial lawn mower in use April 1930 in Berlin

In the 1920s one of the most successful companies to emerge during this period was Atco, at that time a brand name of Charles H Pugh Ltd. The Atco 'Standard' motor mower, launched in 1921 was an immediate success. Just 900 of the 22-inch-cut machines were made in 1921, each costing £75. Within five years, annual production had accelerated to tens of thousands. Prices were reduced and a range of sizes were available, making the Standard the first truly mass-produced engine-powered mower.

=== Rotary mowers ===
Rotary mowers were not developed until engines were small enough and powerful enough to run the blades at sufficient speed. Many people experimented with rotary blade mowers in the late 1920s and early 1930s, and Power Specialties Ltd. introduced a gasoline-powered rotary mower. Kut Kwick replaced the saw blade of the "Pulp Saw" with a double-edged blade and a cutter deck, converting the "Pulp Saw" into the first ever out-front rotary mower.

One company that produced rotary mowers commercially was the Australian Victa company, starting in 1952. Its mowers were lighter and easier to use than similar ones that had come before. The first Victa mowers were made at Mortlake, an inner suburb of Sydney, by local resident Mervyn Victor Richardson. He made his first model out of scrap in his garage. The first Victa mowers were then manufactured, going on sale on 20 September 1952. The new company, Victa Mowers Pty Ltd, was incorporated on 13 February 1953.

The venture was so successful that by 1958 the company moved to much larger premises in Parramatta Road, Concord, and then to Milperra, by which time the mower incorporated an engine, designed and manufactured by Victa, which was specially designed for mowing, rather than employing a general-purpose engine bought from outside suppliers. Two Victa mowers, from 1958 and 1968 respectively, are held in the collection of the National Museum of Australia. The Victa mower is regarded as something of an Australian icon, appearing en masse, in simulated form, at the opening of the Sydney Olympic Games in 2000.

The hover mower, first introduced by Flymo in 1964, is a form of rotary mower using an air cushion on the hovercraft principle.

== Types ==
=== By rotation ===
==== Cylinder or reel mowers ====
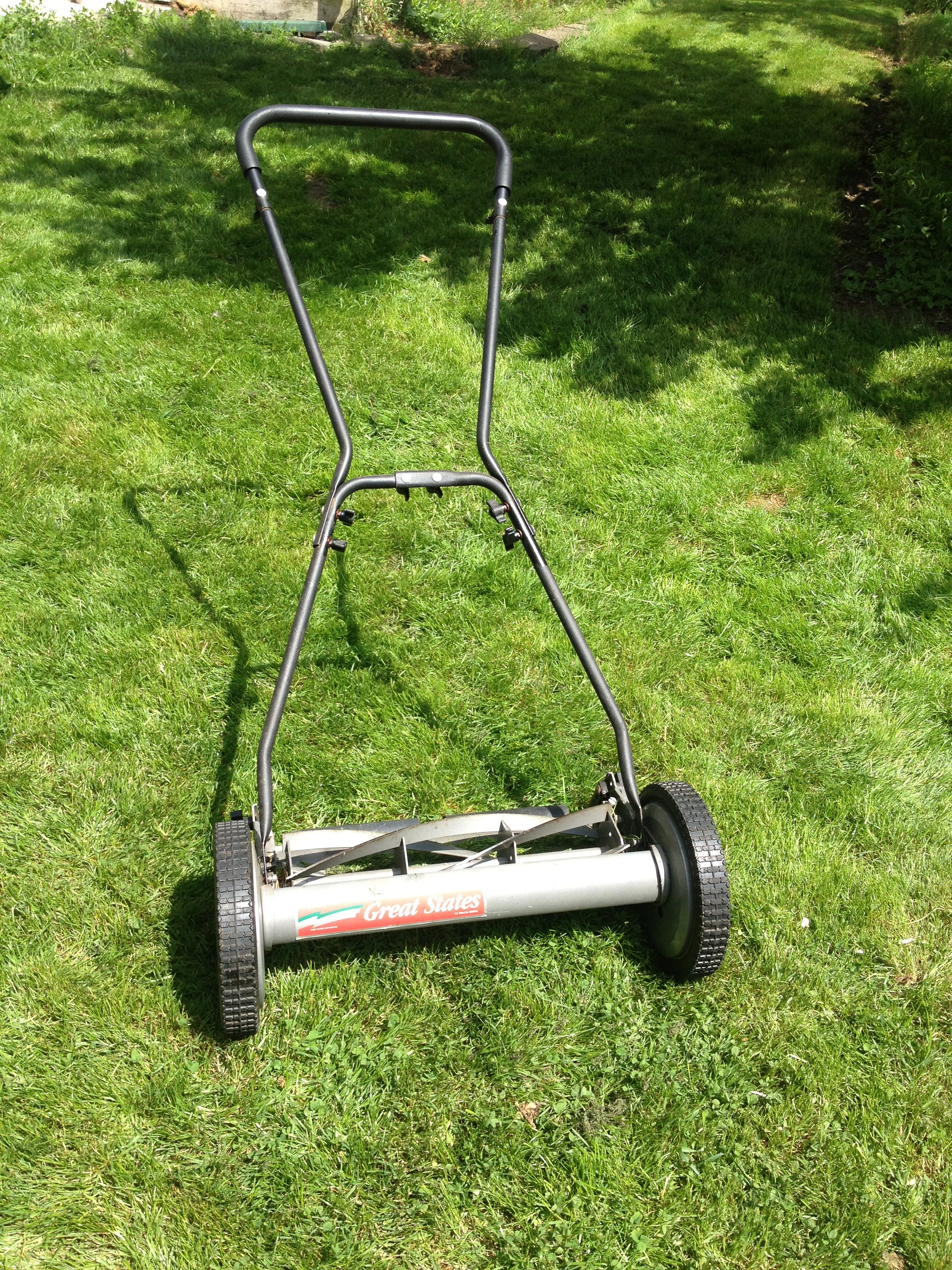
A non-motorized multiple blade reel push mower

A cylinder mower or reel mower carries a fixed, horizontal cutting blade at the desired height of cut. Over this is a fast-spinning reel of blades which force the grass past the cutting bar. Each blade in the blade cylinder forms a helix around the reel axis, and the set of spinning blades describes a cylinder.

Of all the mowers, a properly adjusted cylinder mower makes the cleanest cut of the grass, and this allows the grass to heal more quickly. The cut of a well-adjusted cylinder mower is straight and definite, as if cut with a pair of scissors. This clean cut promotes healthier, thicker and more resilient lawn growth that is more resistant to disease, weeds and parasites. Lawn cut with a cylinder mower is less likely to result in yellow, white or brown discolouration as a result of leaf shredding. While the cutting action is often likened to that of scissors, it is neither necessary nor desirable for the blades of the spinning cylinder to contact the horizontal cutting bar. When the reel touches the cutting bar the work required by the mower increases dramatically. When the gap between the blades is less than the thickness of the grass blades, a clean cut can still be made without additional friction. When the gap is greater than the thickness of the grass blades, grass will slip through the gap uncut. Reel mowers also have more difficulty mowing over uneven terrain.

There are many variants of the cylinder mower. Push mowers have no engine and are usually used on smaller lawn areas where access is a problem, where noise pollution is undesirable and where air pollution is unwanted. As the mower is pushed along, the wheels drive gears which rapidly spin the reel. Typical cutting widths are 10 to 16 inches (250 to 410 mm). Advances in materials and engineering have resulted in these mowers being very light and easy to operate and manoeuvre compared with their predecessors while still giving all the cutting advantages of professional cylinder mowers. Their distinct environmental benefits, both in noise and air pollution, are also strong selling points, something not lost on many international zoos, animal sanctuaries and exclusive hotel groups.

The basic push mower mechanism is also used in gangs towed behind a tractor. The individual mowers are arranged in a "v" behind the tractor with each mower's track slightly overlapping that of the mower in front of it. Gang mowers are used over large areas of turf such as sports fields or parks.

A gasoline engine or electric motor can be added to a cylinder mower to power the cylinder, the wheels, the roller, or any combination of these. A typical arrangement on electric powered machines for residential lawns is for the motor to power the cylinder while the operator pushes the mower along. The electric models can be corded or cordless. On petrol machines the engine drives both the cylinder and the rear roller. Some variants have only three blades in a reel spinning at great speed, and these models are able to cut grass which has grown too long for ordinary push mowers. One type of reel mower, now largely obsolete, was a powered version of the traditional side-wheel push mower, which was used on residential lawns. An internal combustion engine sat atop the reel housing and drove the wheels, usually through a belt. The wheels in turn drove the reel, as in the push mower.

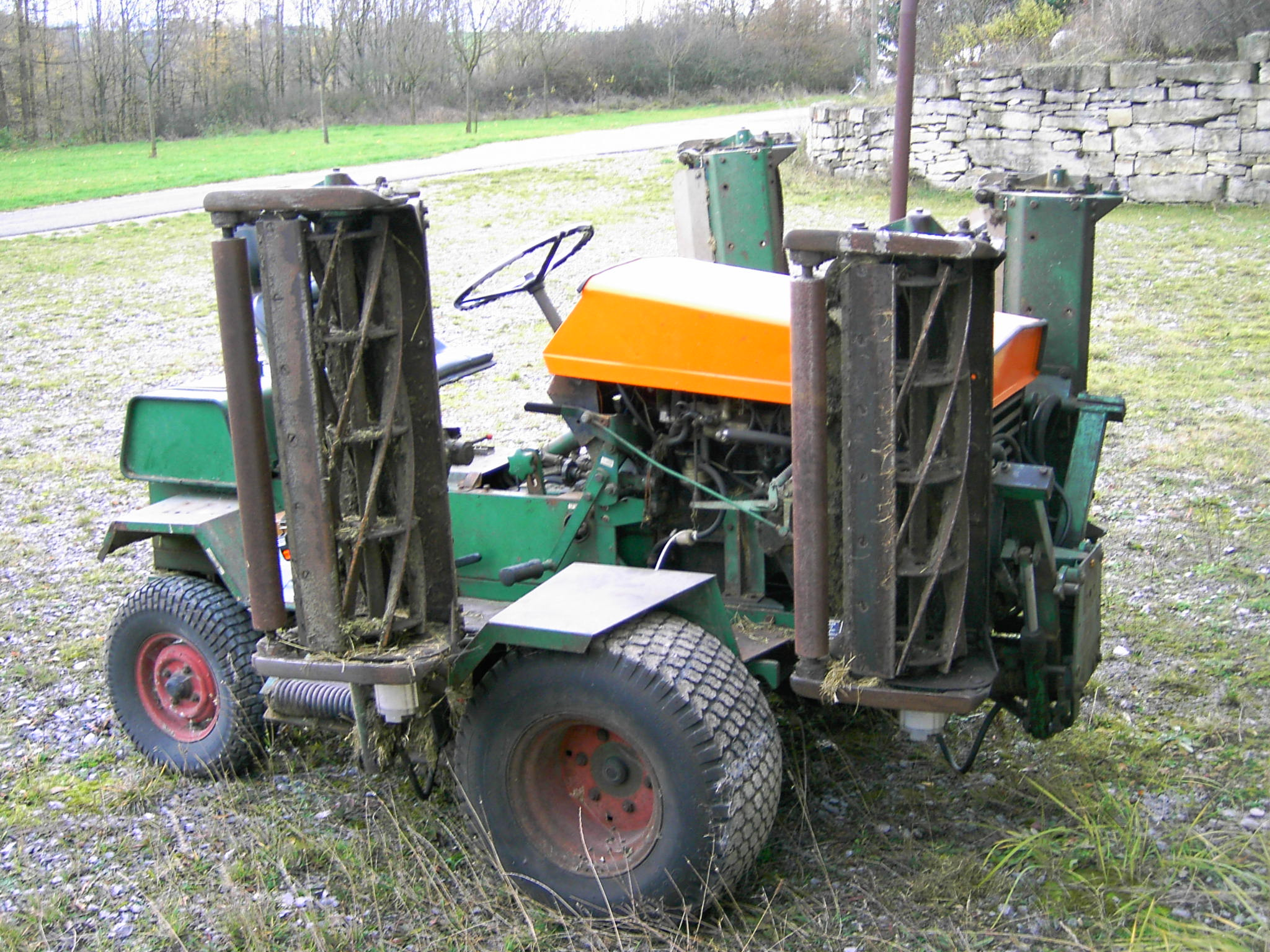
Professional ride-on mower with 4 raisable reels, clearly showing the cylinders of helical blades and the bed knives

Greens mowers are used for the precision cutting of golf greens and have a cylinder made up of at least eight, but normally ten, blades. The machine has a roller before and after the cutting cylinder which smooths the freshly cut lawn and minimizes wheel marks. Due to the weight, the engine also propels the mower. Much smaller and lighter variants of the roller mower are sometimes used for small patches of ornamental lawns around flower beds, and these have no engine.

Riding reel mowers are also produced. Typically, the cutting reels are ahead of the vehicle's main wheels, so that the grass can be cut before the wheels push the grass over onto the ground. The reels are often hydraulically powered.

The main parts of a cylinder or reel mower are:

- Blade reel/cylinder: Consists of numerous (3 to 7) helical blades that are attached to a rotating shaft. The blades rotate, creating a scissor-like cutting motion against the bed knife.
- Bed knife: The stationary cutting mechanism of a cylinder/reel mower. This is a fixed horizontal blade that is mounted to the frame of the mower.
- Body frame: The main structural frame of the mower onto which the other parts of the mower are mounted.
- Wheels: Help propel the mower in action. Generally, reel mowers have two wheels.
- Push handle: The "power source" of a manually operated reel mower. This is a sturdy T-shaped, rectangular, or trapezoidal handle that is connected to the frame, wheels and blade chamber.
- Motor: The power source of a reel mower that is powered by gasoline or electricity.

==== Rotary mowers ====
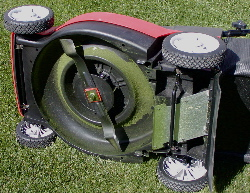
A rotary mower (viewed from underneath), with a mulching blade that rotates around the center

A rotary mower rotates about a vertical axis with the blade spinning at high speed relying on impact to cut the grass. This tends to result in a rougher cut and bruises and shreds the grass leaf resulting in discolouration of the leaf ends as the shredded portion dies. This is particularly prevalent if the blades become clogged or blunt. Most rotary mowers need to be set a little higher than cylinder equivalents to avoid scalping and gouging of slightly uneven lawns, although some modern rotaries are fitted with a rear roller to provide a more formal striped cut. These machines will also tend to cut lower (13 mm or 1/2 in) than a standard four-wheeled rotary.

The main parts of a rotary mower are:

- Cutter deck housing: Houses the blade and the drive system of the mower. It is shaped to effectively eject the grass clippings from the mower.
- Blade mounting and drive system: The blade of a rotary mower is usually mounted directly to the crankshaft of its engine, but it can be propelled by a hydraulic motor or a belt pulley system.
- Mower blade: A blade that rotates in a horizontal plane (about a vertical axis). Some mowers have multiple blades. The blade features edges that are slightly curved upward to generate a continuous air flow as the blade rotates (as a fan), thus creating a sucking and tearing action.
- Engine/motor: May be powered by gasoline or electricity.
- Wheels: Generally four wheels, two front and two rear. Some mowers have a roller in place of the rear wheels.

=== By energy source ===
==== Gasoline (petrol) ====
Extensive grass trimming was not common before the widespread application of the vertical shaft single cylinder gasoline/petrol engine. In the United States this development paralleled the market penetration of companies such as the Briggs & Stratton company of Wisconsin.

Most rotary push mowers are powered by single-cylinder internal combustion engines. Such engines are usually four-stroke engines, used for their greater torque and cleaner combustion (although a number of older models used two-stroke engines), running on gasoline (petrol) or other liquid fuels. Internal combustion engines used with lawn mowers normally have only one cylinder. Power generally ranges from four to seven horsepower. The engines usually have a carburetor and require a manual pull crank to start them, although an electric starter is offered on some models, particularly large riding and commercial mowers. Some mowers have a throttle control on the handlebar with which the operator can adjust the engine speed. Other mowers have a fixed, pre-set engine speed. All are equipped with a governor (often centrifugal/mechanical or air vane style) to open the throttle as needed to maintain the pre-selected speed when the force needed to cut the thicker or taller grass is encountered. Gasoline mowers have the advantages over electric mowers of greater power and distance range. They do create a significant amount of pollution due to the combustion in the engine, and their engines require periodic maintenance such as cleaning or replacement of the spark plug and air filter, and changing the engine oil. California passed Assembly Bill 1356 an air pollution control law on 9 October 2021. The California bill barred sales of spark ignited (gasoline fueled) internal combustion engines less than 25HP used for farm or construction machines as of 1 January 2024. The California bill does not ban turf care machines larger than 25HP or those powered by compression ignition (diesel) engines.

==== Electricity ====
Electric mowers are further subdivided into corded and cordless electric models. Both are relatively quiet, typically producing less than 75 decibels, while a gasoline lawn mower can be 95 decibels or more.

Corded electric mowers are limited in range by their trailing power cord, which may limit their use with lawns extending outward more than 100–150 feet (30–45 m) from the nearest available power outlet. There is the additional hazard with these machines of accidentally mowing over the power cable, which stops the mower and may put users at risk of receiving a dangerous electric shock. Installing a residual-current device (GFCI) on the outlet may reduce the shock risk.

Cordless electric mowers are powered by a variable number (typically 1–4) of 12-to-80-volt rechargeable batteries. Typically, more batteries mean more run time and/or power (and more weight). Batteries can be in the interior of the lawnmower or on the outside. If on the outside, the depleted batteries can be quickly swapped with recharged batteries. Cordless mowers have the maneuverability of a gasoline-powered mower and the environmental friendliness of a corded electric mower, but they are more expensive and come in fewer models (particularly the self-propelling type) than either. The eventual disposal of worn-out batteries is problematic (though some manufacturers offer to recycle them), and the motors in some cordless mowers tend to be less powerful than gasoline motors of the same total weight (including batteries).

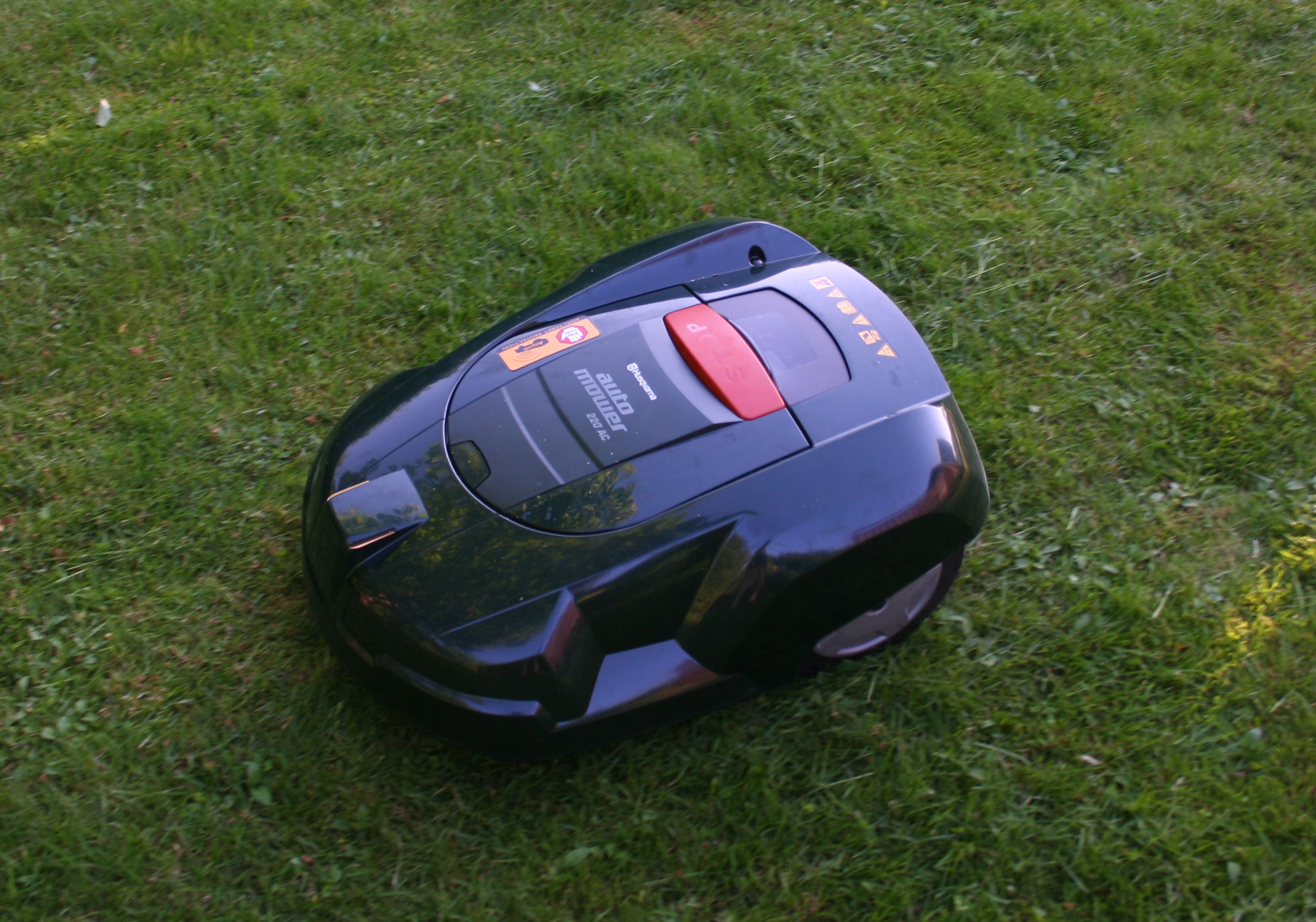
Robotic lawn mower

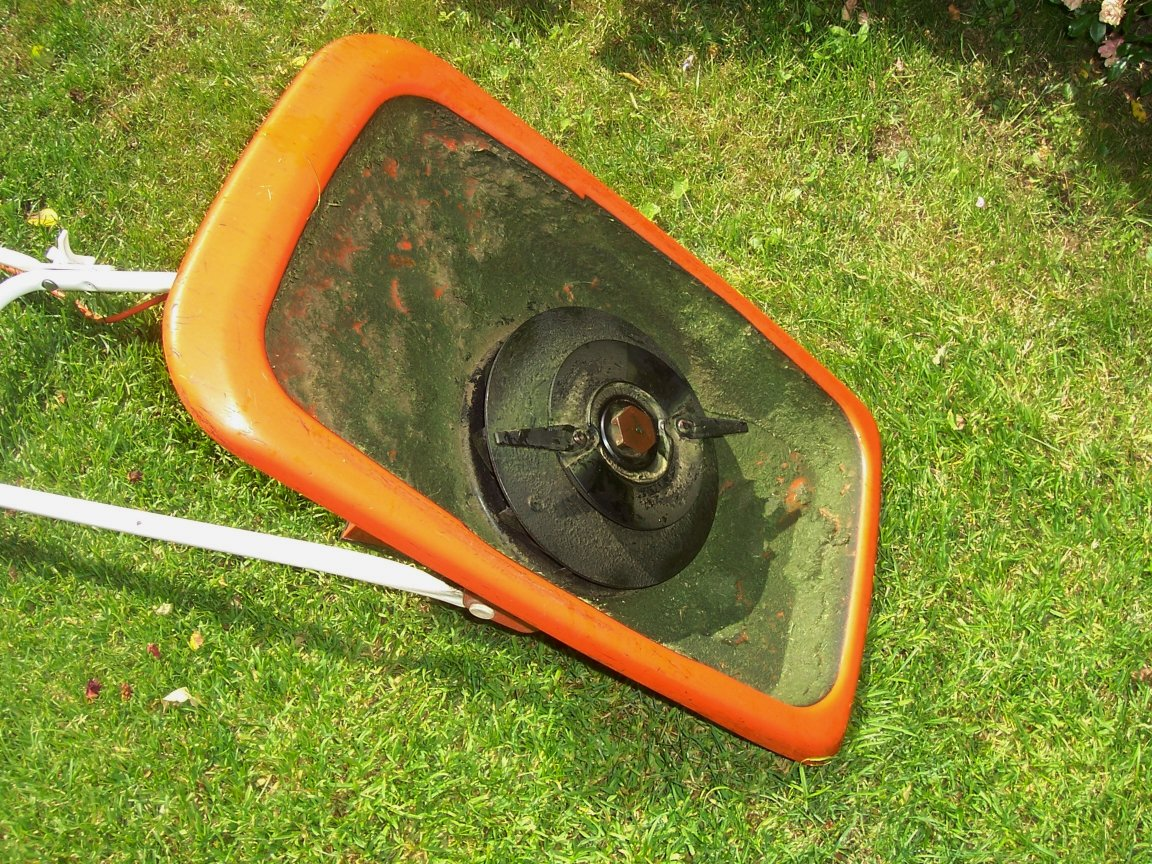
Hover mower (underside view)

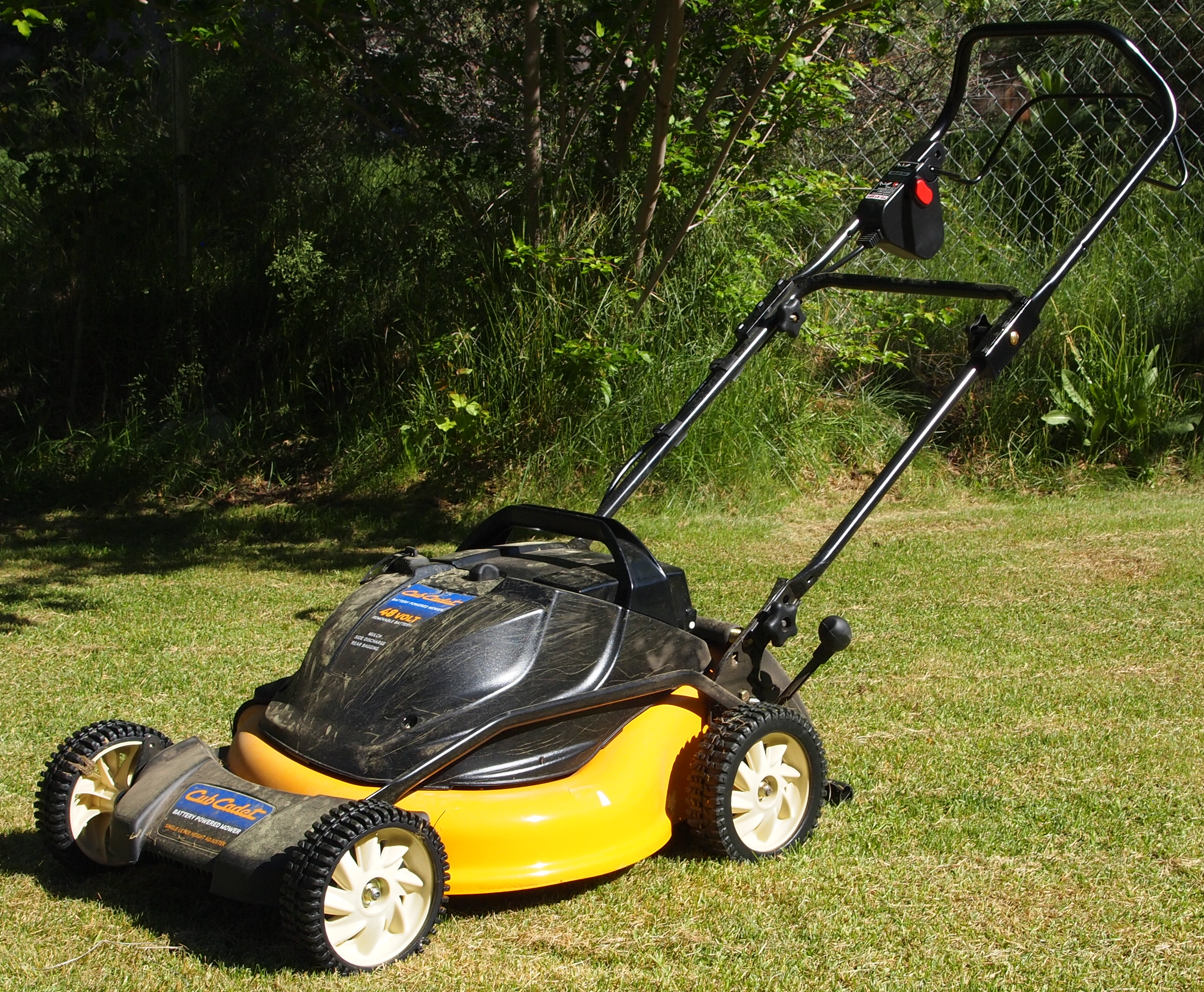
Cordless and rechargeable rotary lawn mower, in mulch mode, removable battery located above rear wheels

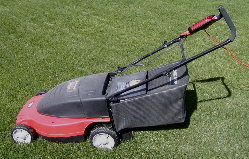
Corded rotary lawn mower, with rear grass catcher (note the red cord attached at the handle)

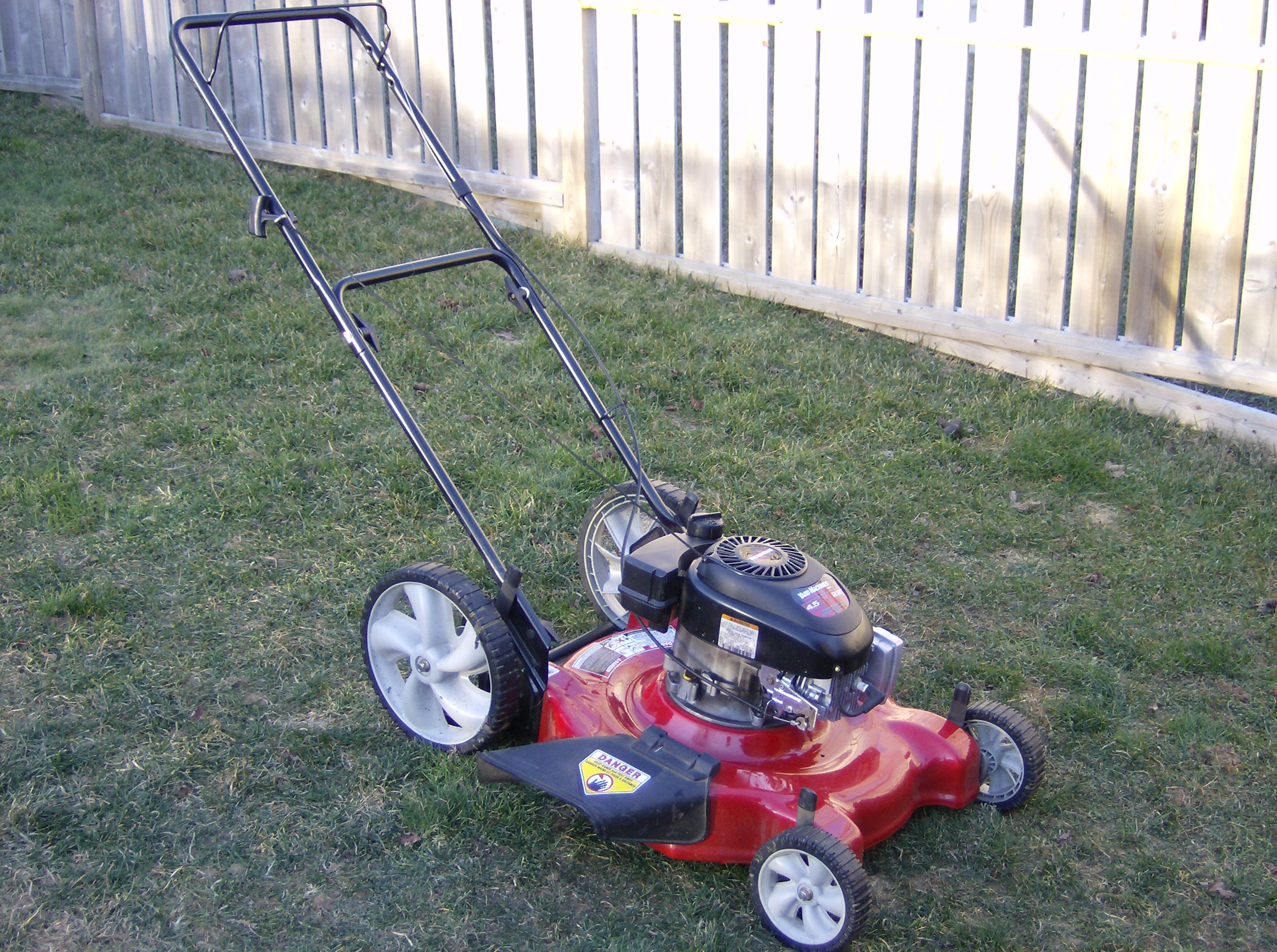
Gasoline rotary lawn mower, with enlarged rear wheels and side discharge

===== Hybrid =====
Cutter and propulsion is powered with a mixture of electricity and fuel. Sometimes the combustion engine is only used to recharge batteries or power electric motors and does not directly power the cutter or propulsion.

==== Propane ====
Lawn mowers powered by propane were also manufactured by Lehr.

==== By hand ====
In hand-powered lawn mowers, the reel is attached to the mower's wheels by gears, so that when the mower is pushed forward, the reel spins several times faster than the plastic or rubber-tired wheels turn. Depending on the placement of the reel, these mowers often cannot cut grass very close to lawn obstacles.

=== Other notable types ===
==== Hover mowers ====
Hover mowers are powered rotary push lawn mowers that use an impeller above the spinning blades to drive air downward, thereby creating an air cushion that lifts the mower above the ground. The operator can then easily move the mower as it floats over the grass. Hover mowers are necessarily light in order to achieve the air cushion and typically have plastic bodies with an electric motor. The most significant disadvantage, however, is the cumbersome usability in rough terrain or on the edges of lawns, as the lifting air-cushion is destroyed by wide gaps between the chassis and the ground. Hover mowers are built to operate on steep slopes, waterfronts, and high-weeded areas, so they are often used by golf course greenskeepers and commercial landscapers. Grass collection is often available, but can be poor in some models. The quality of cut can be inferior if the grass is pushed away from the blade by the cushion of air.

==== Robotic mowers ====
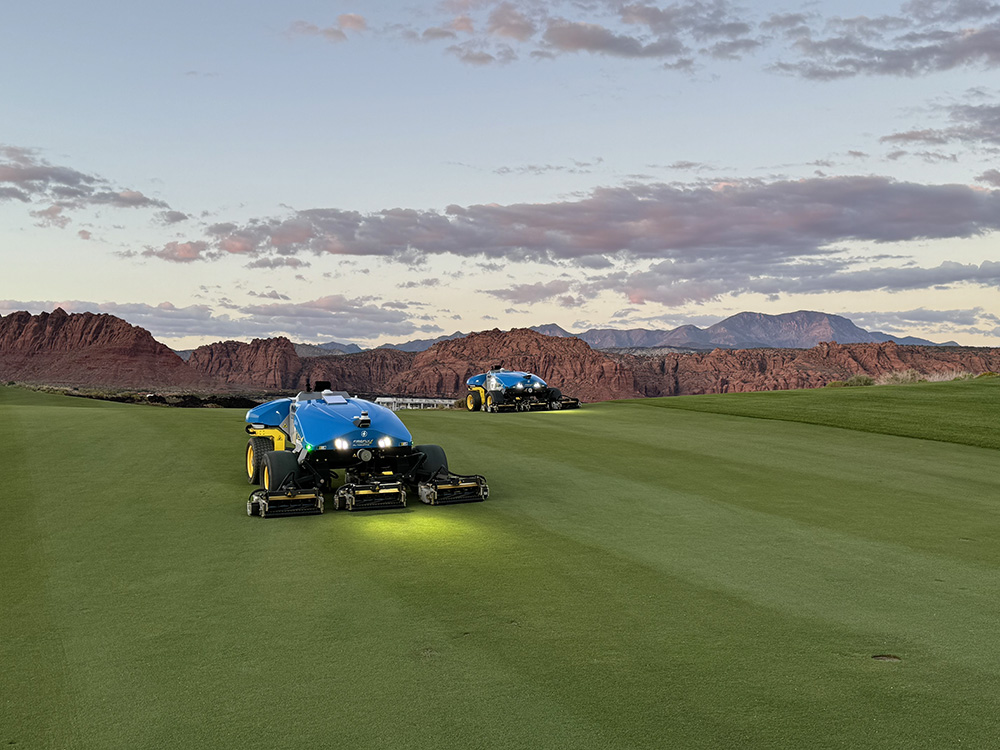
FireFly AMP electric autonomous reel mowers maintained the fairways for the PGA Tour's Black Desert Championship October 9–13, 2024 in Ivins, Utah

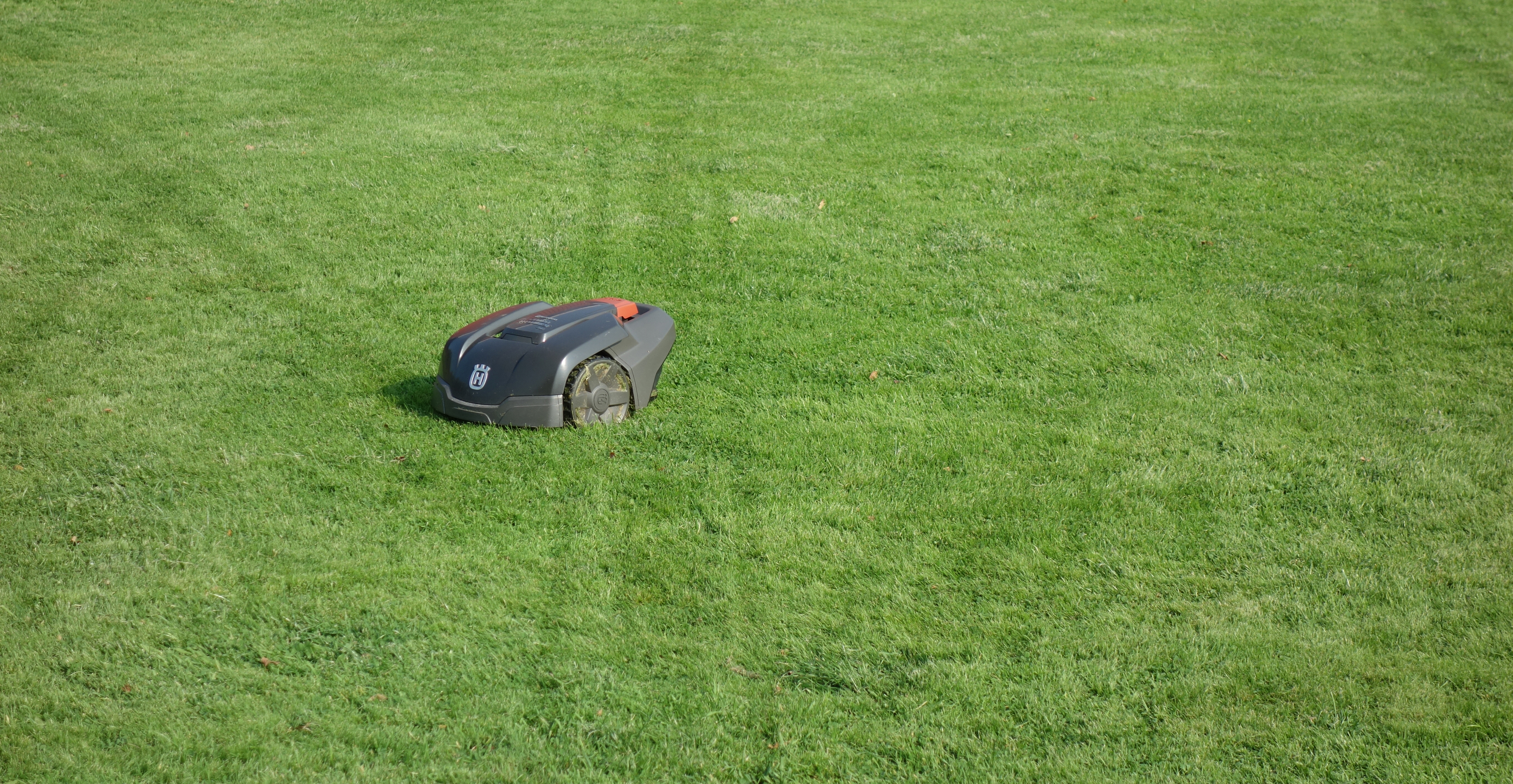
A robotic lawn mower with visible track marks in a lawn indicating the random way it cuts the grass

Video of a robotic lawn mower, the smallest model sold by company Gardena built by Husqvarna, in a garden with 40 m^{2}

A robotic lawn mower is an autonomous robot used to cut lawn grass. A typical robotic lawn mower (in particular earlier generation models) requires the user to set up a border wire around the lawn that defines the area to be mowed. The robot uses this wire to locate the boundary of the area to be trimmed and in some cases to locate a recharging dock. Robotic mowers are capable of maintaining up to 100,000 m^{2} (25 acres) of grass.

Robotic lawn mowers are increasingly sophisticated, are self-docking and some contain rain sensors if necessary, nearly eliminating human interaction. Robotic lawn mowers represented the second largest category of domestic robots used by the end of 2005.

==== Tractor-pulled mowers ====
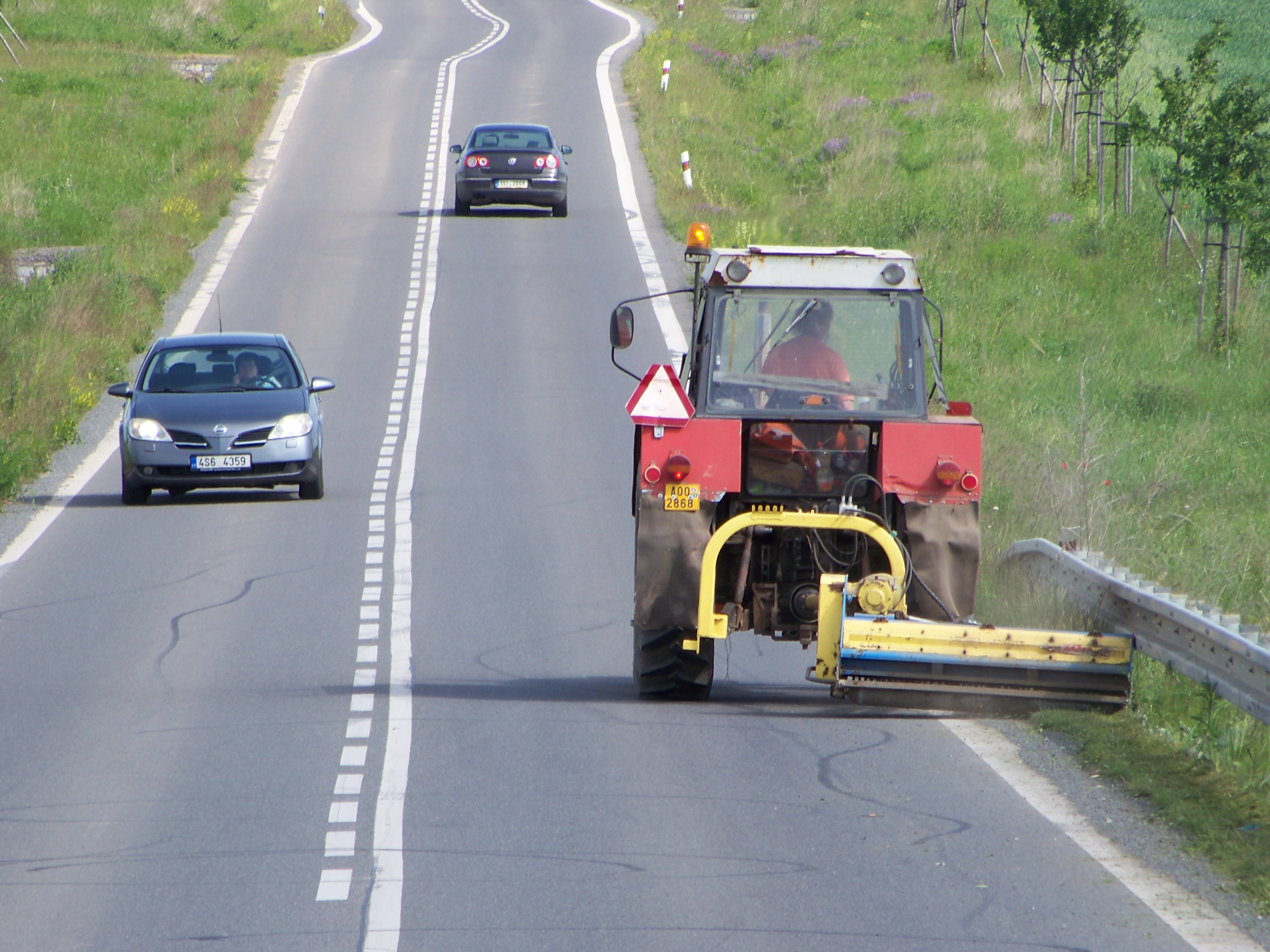
Tractor pulled mower

Tractor pulled mowers are usually in the form of an attachment to a tractor. The attachments can simply function by the movement of the tractor similar to manual push cylinder mowers, but also sometimes may have powered moving blades. They are commonly mounted on either the side or the back of the tractor.

==== Riding lawn mowers ====
Riding mowers (U.S. and Canada) or ride-on mowers (U.K. and Canada) are a popular alternative for large lawns. The operator is provided with a seat and controls on the mower and literally rides on the machine. Most use the horizontal rotating blade system, though usually with multiple blades. A common form of ride-on mower is the lawn tractor. These are usually designed to resemble a small agricultural tractor, with the cutting deck mounted amidships between the front and rear axles.

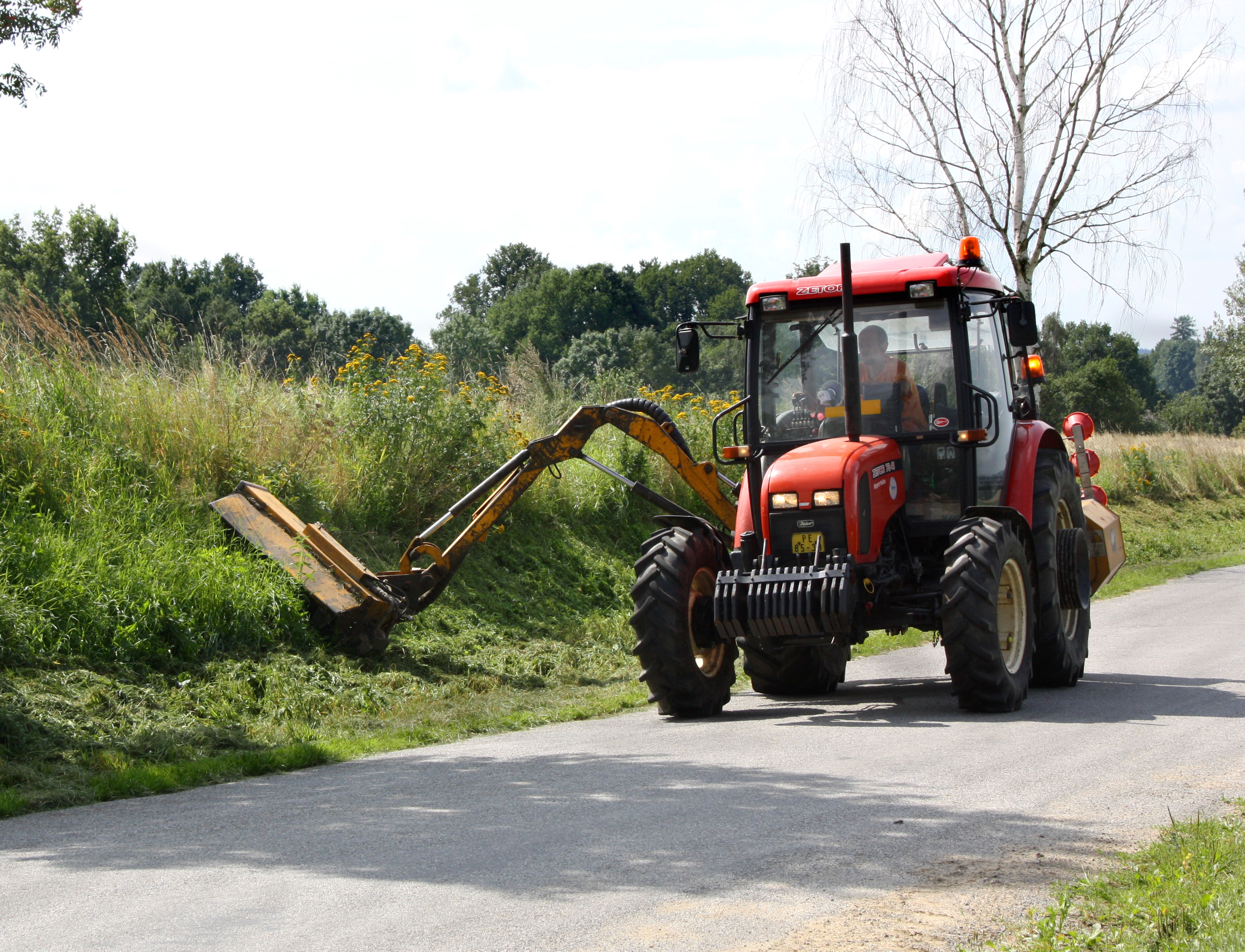
Tractor pulled mower with long reach arm

The drives for these mowers are in several categories. The most common transmission for tractors is a manual transmission. The second most common transmission type is a form of continuously variable transmission, called hydrostatic transmission. These transmissions take several forms, from pumps driving separate motors, which may incorporate a gear reduction, to fully integrated units containing a pump, motor and gear reduction. Hydrostatic transmissions are more expensive than mechanical transmissions, but they are easier to use and can transmit greater torque to the wheels compared to a typical mechanical transmission. The least common drive type, and the most expensive, is electric.

There have been a number of attempts to replace hydrostatic transmissions with lower cost alternatives, but these attempts, which include variable belt types, e.g., MTD's "Auto Drive", and toroidal, have various performance or perception problems that have caused their market life to be short or their market penetration to be limited.

Riding lawn mowers can often mount other devices, such as rototillers/rotavators, snow plows, snow blowers, yard vacuums, occasionally even front buckets or fork-lift tines (these are more properly known as "lawn tractors" in this case, being designed for a number of tasks). The ability to tow other devices is because they have multiple gears, often up to 5 or 6 and variable top speeds. Compact utility tractors equipped with a belly mower can look similar to riding lawn mowers, but they are typically larger, equipped with diesel engines, and feature a three-point hitch and rollover protection structure; these features are generally absent on riding lawn mowers.

The deck of a rotary mower is typically made of steel. Lighter steel is used on less expensive models, and heavier steel on more expensive models for durability. Other deck materials include aluminium, which does not rust and is a staple of higher priced mowers, and hard composite plastic, which does not rust and is lighter and less expensive than aluminium. Electric mowers typically have a plastic deck.

Riding mowers typically have an opening in the side or rear of the housing where the cut grass is expelled, as do most rotary lawn mowers. Some have a grass catcher attachment at the opening to bag the grass clippings.

==== Mulching mowers ====
Mulching mowers use special mulching blades which are available for rotary mowers. The blade is designed to keep the clippings circulating underneath the mower until the clippings are chopped quite small. Other designs have twin blades to mulch the clippings to small pieces. This function has the advantages of forgoing the additional work collecting and disposing of grass clippings while reducing lawn waste in such a way that also creates convenient compost for the lawn, forgoing the expense and adverse environmental effect of fertilizer.

Mower manufacturers market their mowers as side discharge, 2-in-1, meaning bagging and mulching or side discharging and mulching, and 3-in-1, meaning bagging, mulching, and side discharge. Most 2-in-1 bagging and mulching mowers require a separate attachment to discharge grass onto the lawn. Some side discharge mower manufacturers also sell separate "mulching plates" that will cover the opening on the side discharge mower and, in combination with the proper blades, will convert the mower to a mulching mower. These conversions are impractical when compared with 2- or 3-in-1 mowers which can be converted in the field in seconds. There are two types of bagging mowers. A rear bag mower features an opening on the back of the mower through which the grass is expelled into the bag. Hi-vac mowers have a tunnel that extends from the side discharge to the bag. Hi-vac is also the type of grass collection used on some riding lawn mowers and lawn tractors and is suitable for use in dry conditions but less suitable for long wet lush grass as they often clog up. Mulching and bagging mowers are not well suited to long grass or thick weeds. In some ride-on mowers, the cut grass is dropped onto the ground and then collected by a set of rotating bristles, allowing even long, wet grass to be collected.

Rotary mowers with internal combustion engines come in three price ranges. Low priced mowers use older technology, smaller motors, and lighter steel decks. These mowers are targeted at the residential market and typically price is the most important selling point.

==== Grasscycling ====
Some lawn mowers are designed to support grasscycling, a practice in which finely cut grass clippings are left on the lawn surface to decompose and return nutrients to the soil rather than being collected and removed.

==== Professional mowers ====
Professional grass-cutting equipment, used by large establishments such as universities, sports stadiums and local authorities, usually take the form of much larger, dedicated, ride-on platforms or attachments that can be mounted on, or behind, a standard tractor unit (a "gang-mower"). Either type may use rotating-blade or cylindrical-blade type cutters, although high-quality mowed surfaces demand the latter. Wide-area mowers (WAMs) are commercial grade mowers which have decks extended to either side, many to 12 feet (3.7 m). These extensions can be lowered for large area mowing or raised to decrease the mower's width and allow for easy transport on city roads or trailers. Commercial lawn-mowing companies have also enthusiastically adopted types such as the zero-turn mower (in both ride-on and stand-on versions), which allow high speed over the grass surface, and rapid turnaround at the end of rows, as well as excellent maneuverability around obstacles.

Mowers mounted on a tractor's three-point hitch may be known as finish mowers used for maintaining lawn, flail mowers used for maintaining rough grass on rough surfaces, or brush mowers used for cutting brush and small trees.

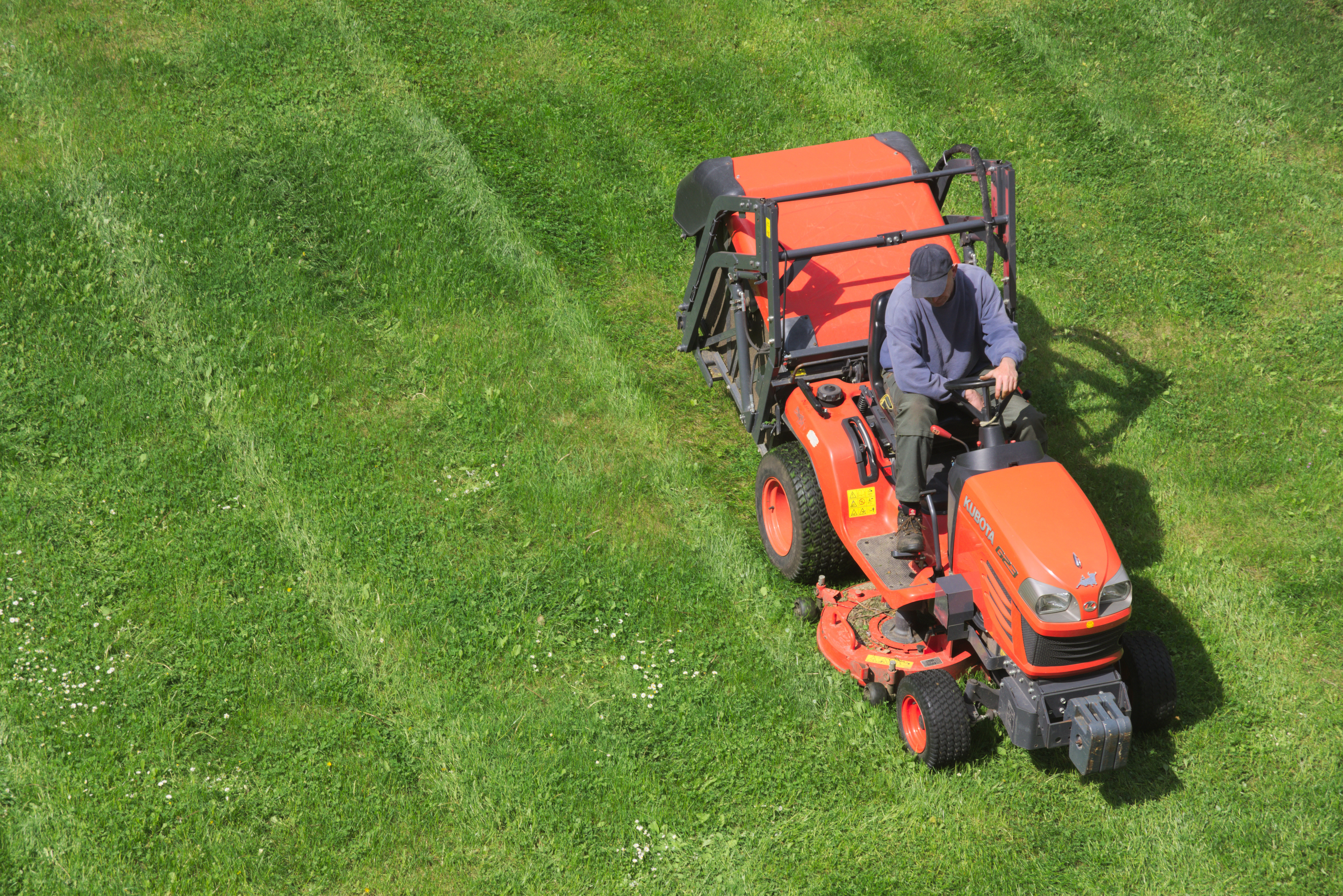
A ride on mower being used to maintain a public garden (2015)

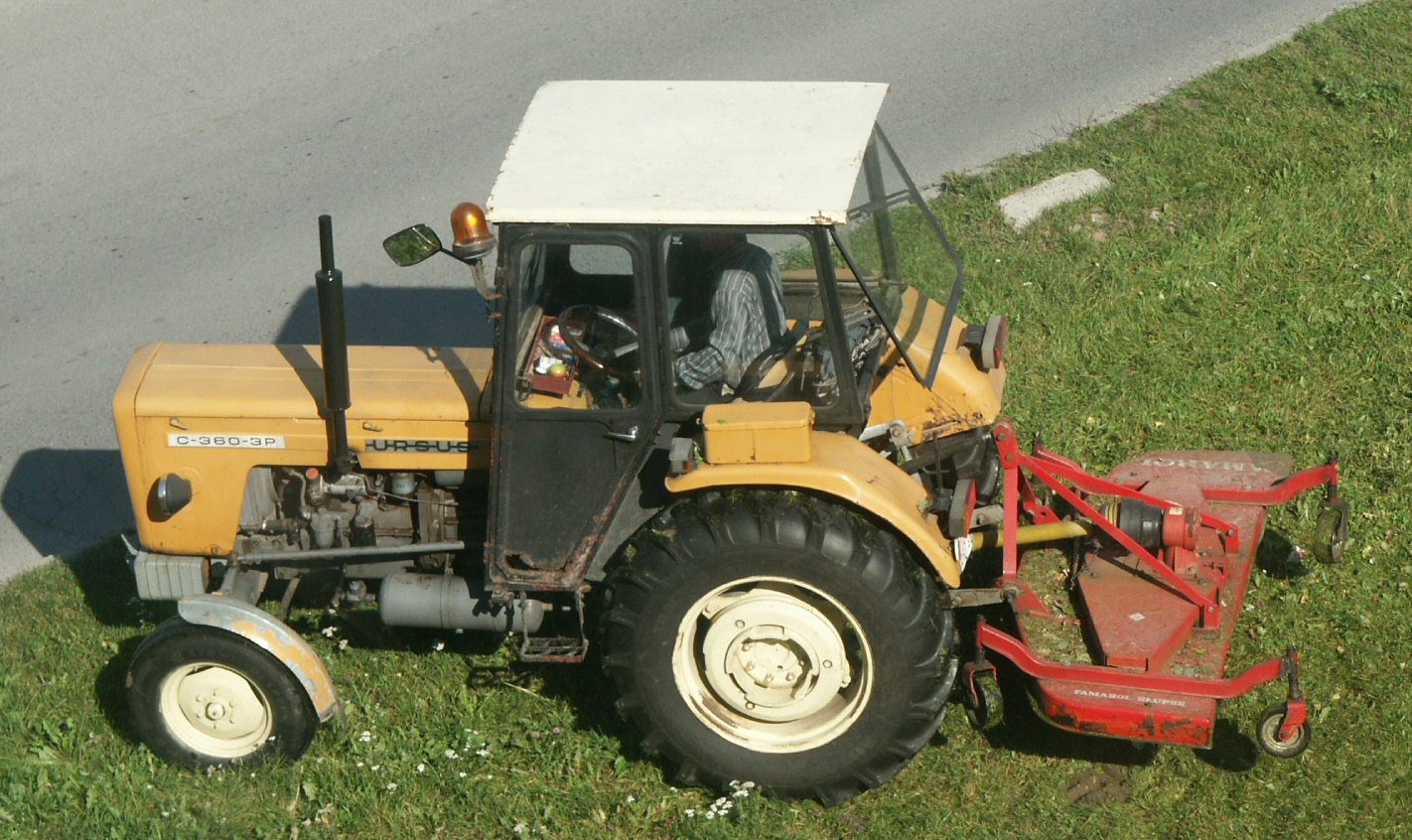
An Ursus tractor-pulled mower

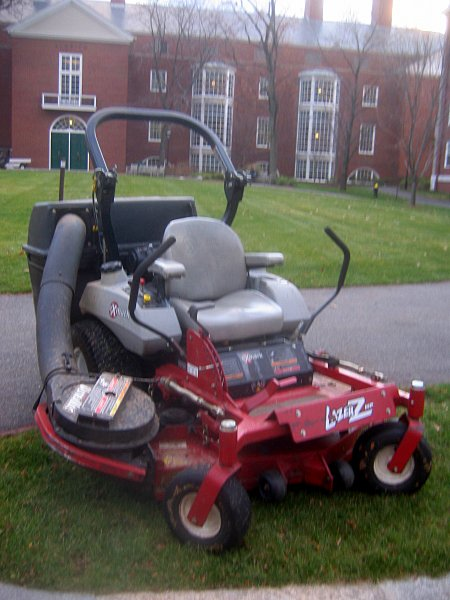
A zero-turn mower

== Safety issues ==
Rotary mowers can throw out debris with extreme velocity and energy. Additionally, the blades of a self-powered push mower (gasoline or electric) can injure a careless or inattentive user; consequently, many come equipped with a dead man's switch to immediately disable the blade rotation when the user is no longer holding the handle. In the United States, over 12,000 people per year are hospitalized as a result of lawn mower accidents. In 2016, 86,000 adults and 4,500 children were admitted to the emergency room for lawnmower injuries. The vast majority of these injuries can be prevented by wearing protective footwear when mowing. The American Academy of Pediatrics recommends that children be at least 12 years old before they are allowed to use a walk-behind lawn mower and at least 16 years of age before using a riding mower and that they "should not operate lawn mowers until they have displayed the necessary levels of judgment, strength, coordination, and maturity". Persons using a mower should wear heavy footwear, eye protection, and hearing protection in the case of engine-powered mowers.

== Environmental and occupational impact ==
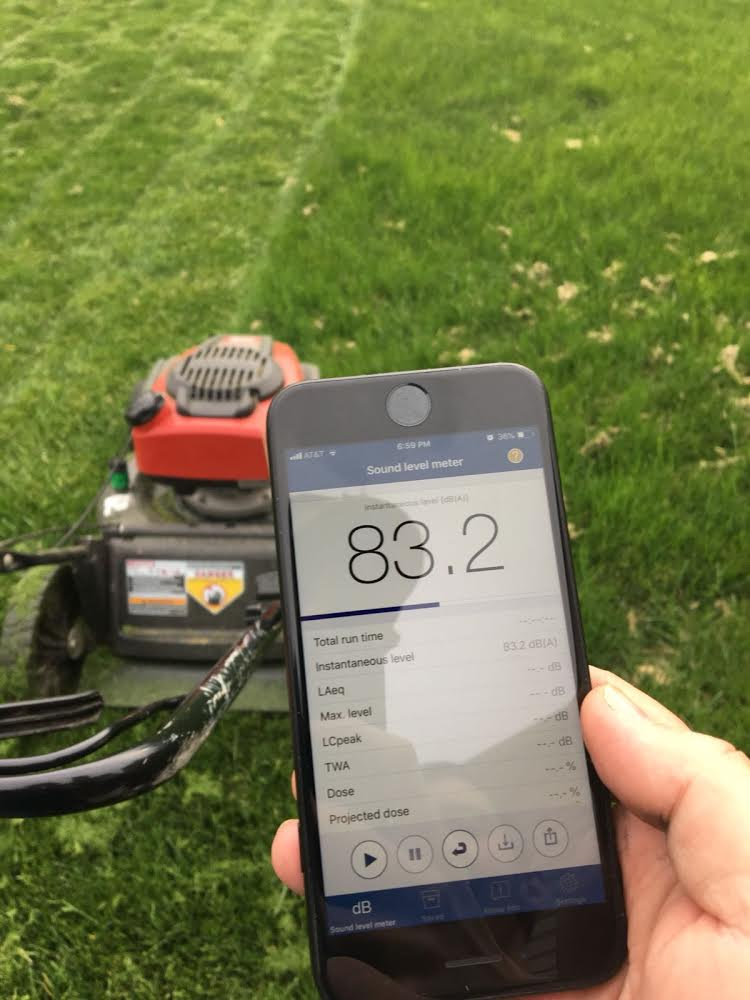
Noise level from a lawn mower measured using the NIOSH Sound Level Meter app

A 2001 study showed that some mowers produce the same amount of pollution (emissions other than carbon dioxide) in one hour as driving a 1992 model vehicle for 650 miles (1,050 km). Another estimate puts the amount of pollution from a lawn mower at four times the amount from a car, per hour, although this report is no longer available. Beginning in 2011, the United States Environmental Protection Agency set standards for lawn equipment emissions and expects a reduction of at least 35 percent.

Gas-powered lawn mowers produce GHG emissions. A minimum-maintained lawn management practice with clipping recycling, and minimum irrigation and mowing, is recommended to mitigate global warming effects from urban turfgrass system.

Battery-powered lawn mowers offer cleaner alternatives to consumers by producing zero emissions, being more efficient, and eliminating risks of spilled gasoline. However, this can be offset due to the process of mining and refining the lithium contained within some models of the batteries. Gasoline-powered lawnmowers are not regulated to have emission-capturing technology.

Mowers can create significant noise pollution, and could cause hearing loss if used without hearing protection for prolonged periods of time. Lawn mowers also present an occupational hearing hazard to the nearly one million people who work in lawn service and ground-keeping. One study assessed the occupational noise exposure among groundskeepers at several North Carolina public universities and found noise levels from push lawn mowers measured between 86 and 95 decibels (A-weighted) and from riding lawn mowers between 88 and 96 dB(A); both types exceeded the National Institute for Occupational Safety and Health (NIOSH) Recommended Exposure Limit of 85 dB(A).

The risk of hearing loss and noise pollution can be reduced by using battery-operated mowers or appropriate hearing protection such as earplugs or earmuffs.

It is possible for a lawn mower to damage the underlying soil, the roots of the grass, and the mower itself if the blades cut through the grass and collide with the underlying ground. Therefore, it is important to adjust mower height properly and choose the right tires for a lawn mower to prevent any marking or digging.

== See also ==
- Alvin Straight
- bush hog
- Ambient noise level
- Groundskeeping
- Lawn mower racing
- Noise control
- Non-road engine
- Organic lawn management
- Roll over protection structure
- Small engine
