= Mower blade =

Cutting component of a lawn mower

Mower blades are the cutting components of lawn mowers. They are usually made of sturdy metals as they must be able to withstand high-speed contact with a variety of objects in addition to grass. The materials used (as well as size, thickness, and design of the blades) vary by manufacturer.

== History ==
The first known lawn mower had a cylinder cutting gear made of iron. It was used to mow sporting grounds and wide-ranging gardens. As manufacturers changed the design and structure of mowers, the cutting mechanism also developed and evolved into several varieties, including cylinder/reel blades, deck blades, mulching blades, and lifting blades.

== Types of mower blades ==
=== Reel or cylinder blades ===
Used in reel or cylinder mowers, cylinder blades are composed of three to seven helical blades welded in a horizontally rotating cylindrical reel, creating a scissor-like cutting action. Unlike other types of mower blades, reel/cylinder blades cannot be replaced; therefore, a broken blade requires replacement of the entire mower. For dull or rusty blades, cleaning and sharpening kits are available.

=== Deck blades ===
Also known as the standard or straight mower blade, this is the most commonly used blade on rotary mowers.

=== Mulching blades ===
A mulching blade, also known as an all-purpose blade, features a curved surface which allows it to work in three ways: lifting, mowing, and mulching. First, the blade pulls the grass up and cuts it. Then, clippings are sucked inside the deck and are chopped into tinier pieces. Finally, the blade’s innermost curve produces air pressure to blow the small clippings out, where they are used to feed the soil.

=== Lifting blades ===
The lifting blade features a slightly curved surface which creates a vertical upward airflow that lifts the grass up and is assumed to provide a cleaner result than the other types of blades.

==== Low-lift blade ====
Low suction power; recommended for mowing terrain with sandy soil.

==== Medium-lift blade ====
Medium suction power; uses less horsepower than high-lift blades.

==== High-lift blade ====
Provides the greatest suction power among the three lifting blades, but also requires the most horsepower. This is the best blade for cutting tall, compact grass.
