= Zero-turn mower =

Type of lawn mowing equipment

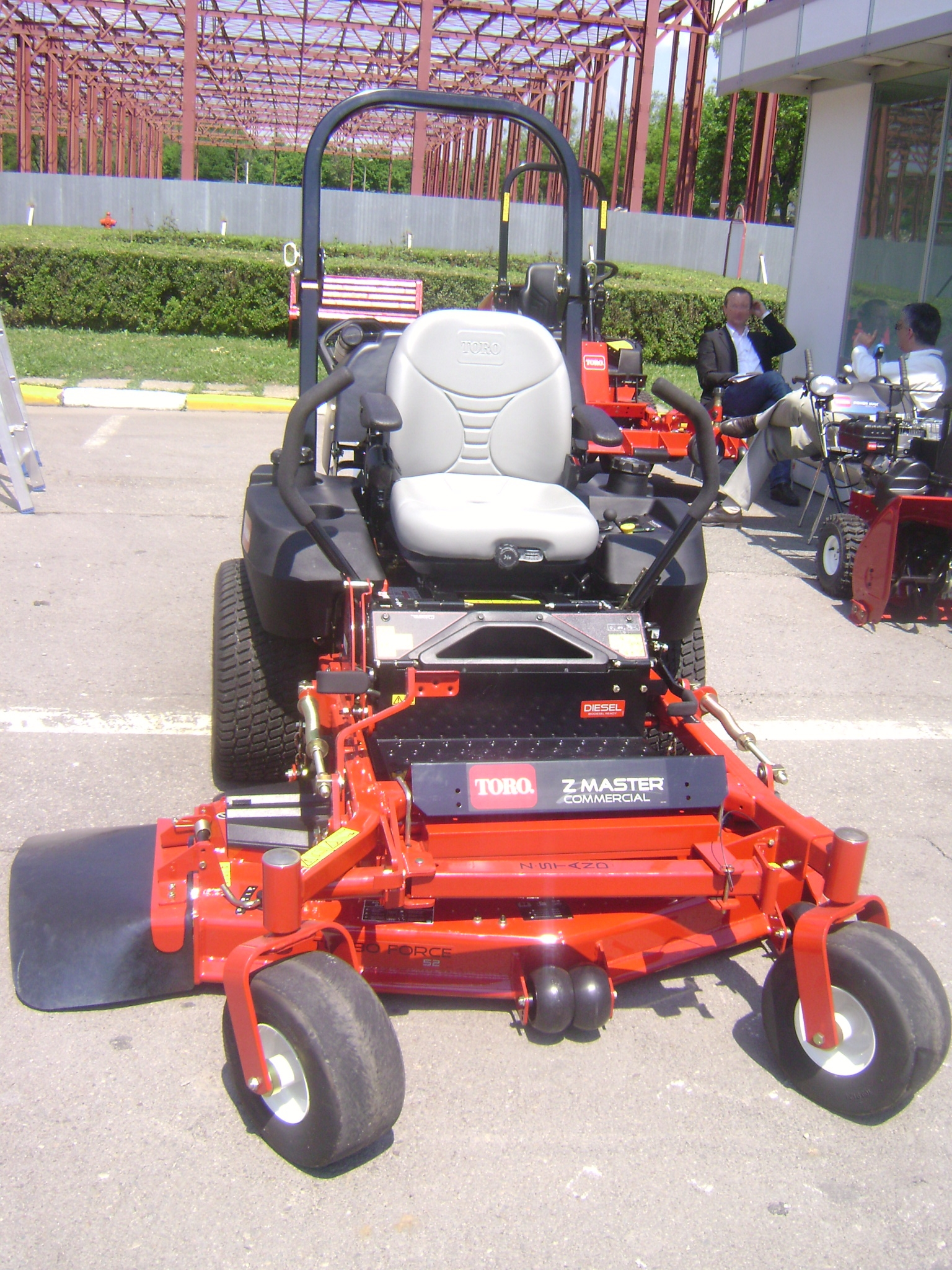
A commercial zero-turn lawn mower with two pivoting front wheels

A zero-turn riding lawn mower (colloquially, a z-turn or zero turn) is a standard riding lawn mower with a turning radius that is effectively zero when the two drive wheels rotate in opposite direction, like a tank turning in place.

Different brands and models achieve this in different ways, with hydraulic speed control of each drive wheel being the most common method when a gasoline or diesel engine is used. Battery-powered models simply use two electric motors. Both commercial duty and homeowner models exist, with varying engine power options, size of cutting decks, and prices. A z-turn mower typically drives faster and costs more than a similarly sized conventional riding mower that has steerable front wheels.

Most current models have four wheels: two small swiveling front tires and two large drive tires in the back. Bush Hog (, Inc. of Selma, Alabama) mowers sometimes come with a small, pivoting fifth wheel mounted in the center behind the driver. Instead of controlling the swiveling tires to steer the machine, the large drive tires rotate independently of each other based on the driver's input. They may rotate in opposite directions. The mower can pivot around a point midway between the drive wheels (the classic z-turn), or it can pivot around either one of the drive wheels if one is stationary, or it can turn in a circle of any radius. Reversal of the direction of travel can be accomplished by causing both wheels to rotate in reverse.

== History ==
In 1949, Warrensburg, MO resident Max B. Swisher invented the very first commercially available zero-turn mower and called it the "Ride King". It was a three-wheeled machine: one drive wheel in front and two in the rear. The patented system had a driven front wheel that was capable of turning 360 degrees. The wheel was driven by the motor in the same direction at all times. In order to reverse or utilize the zero-turn capabilities, the driver simply turned the steering wheel 180 degrees and the mower would move backwards.

In 1963, John Regier, an employee at Hesston Corporation, developed a zero-turn lawnmower based on the company's agricultural swather, which used a counter-rotating belt-and-pulley mechanism to cut hay, alfalfa and other farming materials and lay them out in windrows. Regier's lawnmower used two independent drive levers, instead of the steering wheel common on most riding mowers. Regier's patent was eventually sold to Excel Industries, the parent company of Hustler Turf and BigDog Mower Co.

In 1974, the Dixon company coined the term zero-turn radius on their entrance into the mower market.

In 2009, the Hustler Zeon became the first fully electric zero-turn mower, with four 12-volt lead acid batteries. As of 2023 most fully electric zero turn mowers use lithium ion batteries ranging from 40 to 80 volts.

As of 2023, there are more than three dozen zero-turn mower manufacturers, offering a range of mid-mounted and out-front mowing deck options and accessories.

== Steering ==
For most zero-turn mowers today, steering is simply changing the speeds of the drive tires, a method called differential steering. The tire speed is controlled by two levers that protrude on either side of the driver and typically extend over the lap (a.k.a. lap bars). It is not that different from steering a shopping cart. When both levers are pushed forward simultaneously with the same force, the mower moves forward; when both levers are pulled back simultaneously with the same force, the mower moves backward. Pushing one lever more than the other causes the mower to make a gentle turn. Pushing one lever forward and pulling the other back pivots the mower about its center by driving its wheels in opposite directions, creating a zero-radius turn.

Zero-turn mowers can use steering wheels but must be designed much differently. For example, Cub Cadet is one of the few zero-turns to use a steering wheel by connecting the back wheels to an axle. The axle is mounted in its midpoint to the body of the mower.

== Operation ==
Zero-turn mowers are designed to cut closely around obstacles to significantly reduce the need for trimming and edging. These mowers pivot through 180 degrees without leaving any uncut grass. Maximum lever movement means maximum fluid flow, which translates into a rapidly turning wheel. If one drive wheel turns more rapidly than the other, the machine moves along a curved path. If both wheels turn at the same speed, the machine follows a straight path. If one wheel stops and the other turns, or if the wheels turn in opposite directions, the mower pivots.

This drive system can be used on two types of zero-turn mowers:

- Mid mount, where the mower is suspended under a 4-wheel chassis, with front caster wheels and rear drive wheels
- Out front, where the mower is front-mounted and thus terrain following, providing a higher level of balance, comfort, safety and performance. The Out-front models use a centralised main drive wheel system with front and rear caster wheels.

As both types use traction only as a steering system, care must be taken on any sloping terrain. Loss of traction causes total loss of steering.
