= List of moths of Australia (Anthelidae) =

Partial list of Australian moths

The family Anthelidae comprise the "Australian woolly bears" and are found only in Australia and New Guinea. This list consists of the species found in Australia. It is an index to the species articles and forms part of the full List of moths of Australia.

== Anthelinae ==
- Anthela achromata Turner, 1904
- Anthela addita (Walker, 1865)
- Anthela adriana (Swinhoe, 1902)
- Anthela allocota Turner, 1921
- Anthela ariprepes Turner, 1921
- Anthela asciscens (T.P. Lucas, 1891)
- Anthela astata Turner, 1926
- Anthela asterias (Meyrick, 1891)
- Anthela barnardi Turner, 1922
- Anthela basigera (Walker, 1865)
- Anthela callileuca Turner, 1922
- Anthela callispila Lower, 1905
- Anthela callixantha (Lower, 1902)
- Anthela canescens (Walker, 1855)
- Anthela cinerascens (Walker, 1855)
- Anthela clementi (Swinhoe, 1902)
- Anthela cnecias Turner, 1921
- Anthela connexa (Walker, 1855)
- Anthela decolor Turner, 1939
- Anthela deficiens (Walker, 1865)
- Anthela denticulata (Newman, 1856)
- Anthela euryphrica Turner, 1936
- Anthela excellens (Walker, 1855)
- Anthela exoleta (Swinhoe, 1892)
- Anthela ferruginosa Walker, 1855
- Anthela guenei (Newman, 1856)
- Anthela habroptila Turner, 1921
- Anthela heliopa (Lower, 1902)
- Anthela hyperythra Turner, 1921
- Anthela inornata (Walker, 1855)
- Anthela limonea (Butler, 1874)
- Anthela neurospasta Turner, 1902
- Anthela nicothoe (Boisduval, 1832)
- Anthela ocellata (Walker, 1855)
- Anthela ochroptera (Lower, 1892)
- Anthela oressarcha Turner, 1921
- Anthela ostra Swinhoe, 1903
- Anthela phaeodesma Turner, 1921
- Anthela phoenicias Turner, 1902
- Anthela postica (Walker, 1855)
- Anthela protocentra (Meyrick, 1891)
- Anthela pudica (Swinhoe, 1902)
- Anthela pyrrhobaphes Turner, 1926
- Anthela reltoni (T.P. Lucas, 1895)
- Anthela repleta (Walker, 1855)
- Anthela rubeola (R. Felder, 1874)
- Anthela rubicunda (Swinhoe, 1902)
- Anthela stygiana (Butler, 1882)
- Anthela subfalcata (Walker, 1855)
- Anthela tetraphrica Turner, 1921
- Anthela unisigna Swinhoe, 1903
- Anthela varia (Walker, 1855)
- Anthela virescens Turner, 1939
- Anthela xantharcha (Meyrick, 1891)
- Anthela xanthocera Turner, 1922
- Chelepteryx chalepteryx (R. Felder, 1874)
- Chelepteryx collesi Gray, 1835
- Chenuala heliaspis (Meyrick, 1891)
- Nataxa amblopis (Turner, 1944)
- Nataxa flavescens (Walker, 1855)
- Omphaliodes obscura (Walker, 1855)
- Pterolocera amplicornis Walker, 1855
- Pterolocera elizabetha (White, 1841)
- Pterolocera ferruginea Strand, 1925
- Pterolocera ferrugineofusca Strand, 1925
- Pterolocera insignis (Herrich-Schäffer, 1856)
- Pterolocera isogama Turner, 1931
- Pterolocera leucocera (Turner, 1921)
- Pterolocera rubescens (Walker, 1865)

== Munychryiinae ==
- Gephyroneura cosmia Turner, 1921
- Munychryia periclyta Common & McFarland, 1970
- Munychryia senicula Walker, 1865
