= A. australasiae =

A. australasiae may refer to:

- Abacetus australasiae, a ground beetle found in Australia
- Agrilus australasiae, the acacia flat-headed jewel beetle, found in Australia
- Anthela australasiae a synonym of Anthela nicothoe, a moth found in Australia
