= Anthela =

Scientific classification
- Kingdom: Animalia
- Phylum: Arthropoda
- Class: Insecta
- Order: Lepidoptera
- Family: Anthelidae
- Genus: Anthela; Walker, 1855

Synonyms
- Darala Walker, 1855; Ommatoptera Herrich-Schäffer, 1855; Baeodromus Herrich-Schäffer, 1858; Laranda Herrich-Schäffer, 1858; Colussa Walker, 1860; Arnissa Walker, 1869; Newmania Swinhoe, 1892; Eulophocampe Scott, 1893

Genus of moths

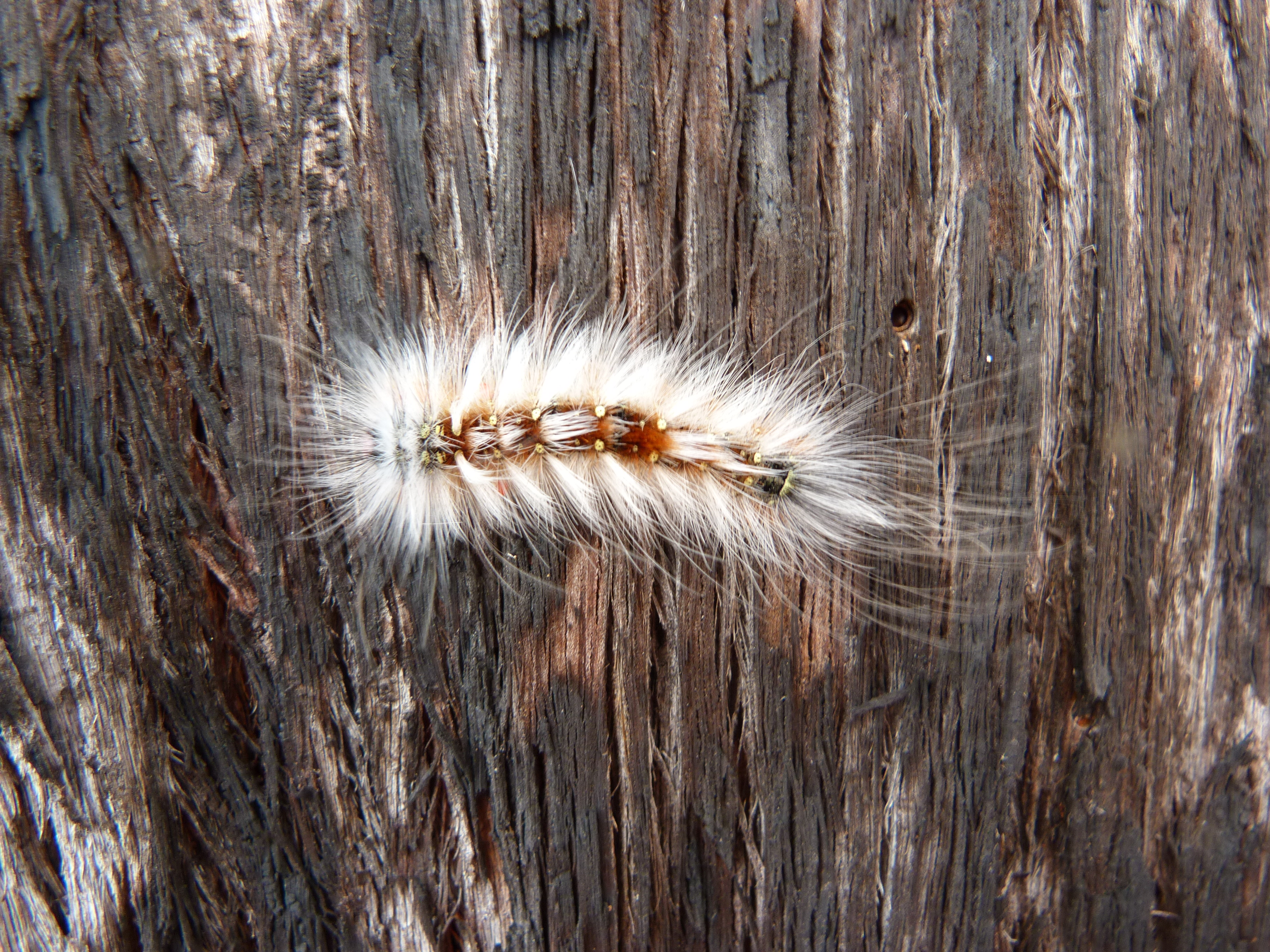
Anthela varia larva

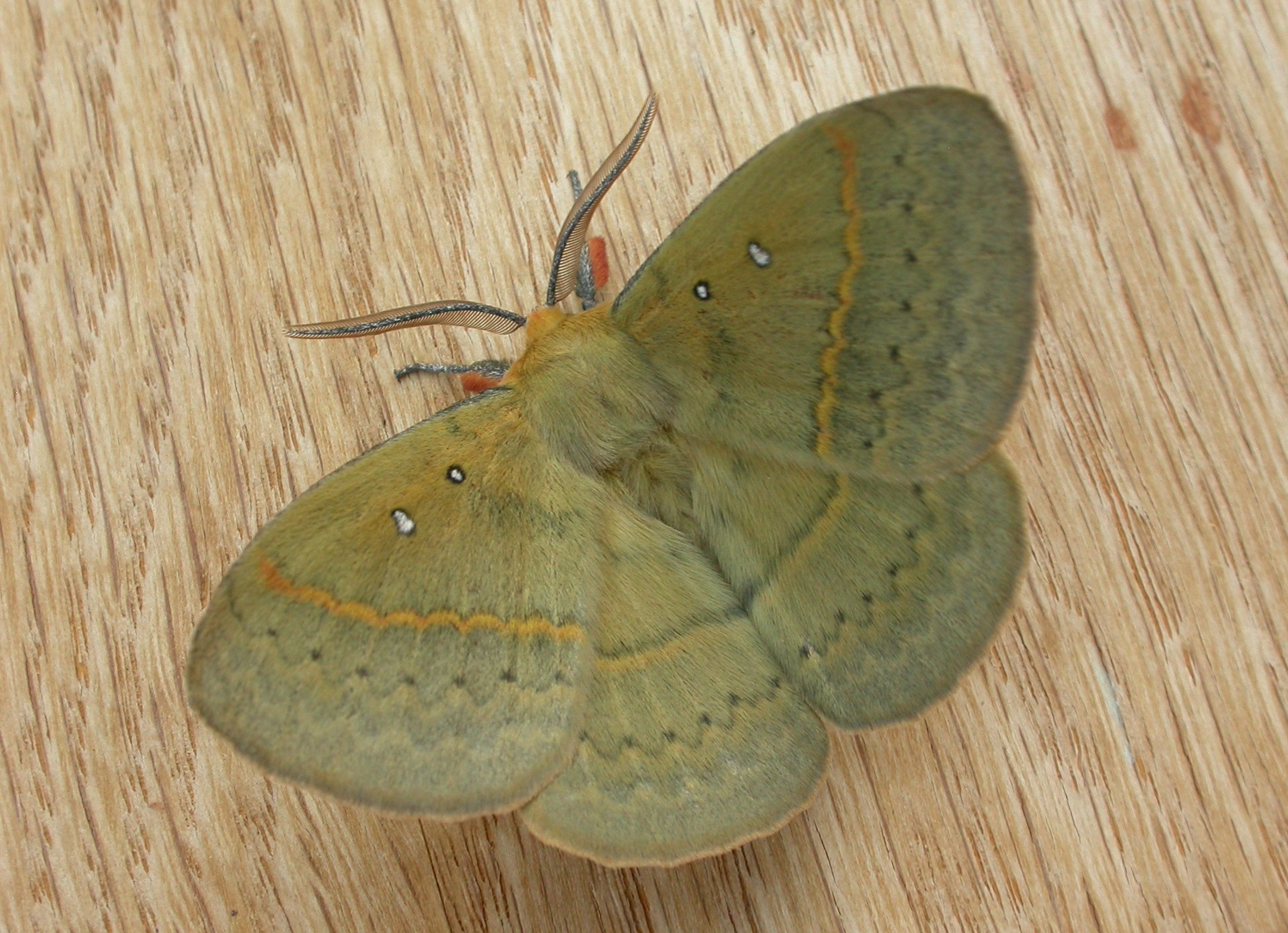
Anthela nicothoe

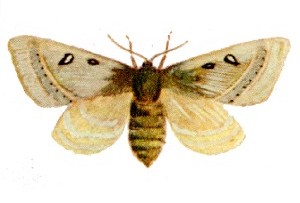
Anthela ocellata

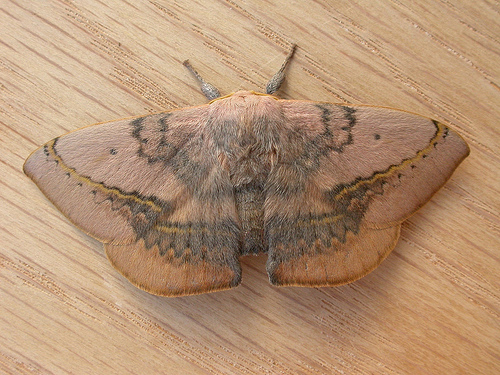
Anthela varia

Anthela is a genus of moths of the family Anthelidae. The genus was erected by Francis Walker in 1855.

== Species ==
- Anthela achromata
- Anthela acuta - common anthelid moth
- Anthela addita
- Anthela adriana
- Anthela allocota
- Anthela angiana
- Anthela ariprepes
- Anthela asciscens
- Anthela astata
- Anthela asterias
- Anthela barnardi
- Anthela basigera
- Anthela binotata
- Anthela brunneilinea
- Anthela callileuca
- Anthela callispila
- Anthela callixantha
- Anthela canescens
- Anthela centralistrigata
- Anthela charon
- Anthela clementi
- Anthela cnecias
- Anthela connexa
- Anthela decolor
- Anthela deficiens
- Anthela denticulata
- Anthela ekeikei
- Anthela euryphrica
- Anthela excellens
- Anthela exoleta
- Anthela ferruginosa
- Anthela guenei
- Anthela habroptila
- Anthela heliopa
- Anthela hyperythra
- Anthela inconstans
- Anthela inornata
- Anthela limonea
- Anthela linearis
- Anthela linopepla
- Anthela maculosa
- Anthela neurospasta
- Anthela nicothoe - urticating anthelid
- Anthela ocellata - eyespot anthelid
- Anthela ochroptera
- Anthela odontogrammata
- Anthela oressarcha
- Anthela ostra
- Anthela phaeodesma
- Anthela phoenicias
- Anthela postica
- Anthela protocentra
- Anthela pudica
- Anthela pyrrhobaphes
- Anthela reltoni
- Anthela repleta
- Anthela roberi
- Anthela rosea
- Anthela rubeola
- Anthela rubescens
- Anthela rubicunda
- Anthela rubriscripta
- Anthela serranotata
- Anthela stygiana
- Anthela subfalcata
- Anthela tetraphrica
- Anthela trisecta
- Anthela unisigna
- Anthela varia - variable anthelid or hairy mary caterpillar
- Anthela virescens
- Anthela xantharcha
- Anthela xanthocera

== Status unknown ==
- Anthela julia Hulstaert, 1924
- Anthela lineosa (Walker, 1862)
- Anthela xanthobapta Lower
