= Anthela charon =

Scientific classification
- Kingdom: Animalia
- Phylum: Arthropoda
- Class: Insecta
- Order: Lepidoptera
- Family: Anthelidae
- Genus: Anthela
- Species: A. charon

Binomial name
- Anthela charon Bethune-Baker, 1908

Synonyms
- Anthela kebea Strand, 1929

Species of moth

Anthela charon is a moth of the Anthelidae family. It is found in New Guinea.
