= Anthela inconstans =

Scientific classification
- Kingdom: Animalia
- Phylum: Arthropoda
- Class: Insecta
- Order: Lepidoptera
- Family: Anthelidae
- Genus: Anthela
- Species: A. inconstans

Binomial name
- Anthela inconstans Joicey, Noakes & Talbot, 1915

Species of moth

Anthela inconstans is a moth of the Anthelidae family. It is found in New Guinea.
