= Anthela maculosa =

Scientific classification
- Kingdom: Animalia
- Phylum: Arthropoda
- Class: Insecta
- Order: Lepidoptera
- Family: Anthelidae
- Genus: Anthela
- Species: A. maculosa

Binomial name
- Anthela maculosa (Lucas, 1898)

Synonyms
- Darala maculosa Lucas, 1898

Species of moth

Anthela maculosa is a moth of the Anthelidae family. It is found in Australia.
