= Anthela ekeikei =

Scientific classification
- Kingdom: Animalia
- Phylum: Arthropoda
- Class: Insecta
- Order: Lepidoptera
- Family: Anthelidae
- Genus: Anthela
- Species: A. ekeikei

Binomial name
- Anthela ekeikei Bethune-Baker, 1904

Synonyms
- Collusa ekeikei; Anthela ekeikei mediana Strand, 1929; Anthela ekeikei obsoletipicta Strand, 1929; Anthela ekeikei pupillifera Strand, 1929

Species of moth

Anthela ekeikei is a moth of the family Anthelidae. It is found in New Guinea.
