= Anthela linearis =

Scientific classification
- Kingdom: Animalia
- Phylum: Arthropoda
- Class: Insecta
- Order: Lepidoptera
- Family: Anthelidae
- Genus: Anthela
- Species: A. linearis

Binomial name
- Anthela linearis (T. P. Lucas, 1891)

Synonyms
- Darala linearis T. P. Lucas, 1891

Species of moth

Anthela linearis is a moth of the family Anthelidae first described by Thomas Pennington Lucas in 1891. It is found in Australia. The placement of this species with the subfamily Anthelinae is uncertain.
