= Anthela lineosa =

Scientific classification
- Kingdom: Animalia
- Phylum: Arthropoda
- Class: Insecta
- Order: Lepidoptera
- Family: Anthelidae
- Genus: Anthela
- Species: A. lineosa

Binomial name
- Anthela lineosa (Walker, 1862)

Synonyms
- Darala lineosa Walker, 1862

Species of moth

Anthela lineosa is a moth of the Anthelidae family.
