= Anthela binotata =

Scientific classification
- Kingdom: Animalia
- Phylum: Arthropoda
- Class: Insecta
- Order: Lepidoptera
- Family: Anthelidae
- Genus: Anthela
- Species: A. binotata

Binomial name
- Anthela binotata Butler, 1886

Species of moth

Anthela binotata is a moth of the Anthelidae family. The type location is Peak Down.
