= Corticomis eupterotioides =

Scientific classification
- Domain: Eukaryota
- Kingdom: Animalia
- Phylum: Arthropoda
- Class: Insecta
- Order: Lepidoptera
- Family: Anthelidae
- Genus: Corticomis
- Species: C. eupterotioides

Binomial name
- Corticomis eupterotioides Van Eecke, 1924

Species of moth

Corticomis eupterotioides is a moth of the Anthelidae family. It was described by Van Eecke in 1924. It is found in New Guinea.
