= Anthela brunneilinea =

Scientific classification
- Kingdom: Animalia
- Phylum: Arthropoda
- Class: Insecta
- Order: Lepidoptera
- Family: Anthelidae
- Genus: Anthela
- Species: A. brunneilinea

Binomial name
- Anthela brunneilinea Hulstaert, 1924

Species of moth

Anthela brunneilinea is a moth of the Anthelidae family. It is found on the Kei Islands.
