= Anthela trisecta =

Scientific classification
- Kingdom: Animalia
- Phylum: Arthropoda
- Class: Insecta
- Order: Lepidoptera
- Family: Anthelidae
- Genus: Anthela
- Species: A. trisecta

Binomial name
- Anthela trisecta (T. P. Lucas, 1898)

Synonyms
- Darala trisecta T. P. Lucas, 1898

Species of moth

Anthela trisecta is a moth of the family Anthelidae first described by Thomas Pennington Lucas in 1898. It is found in Australia.

The wingspan is about 56 mm. The forewings are ochreous, shaded with faint fuscous. The hindwings are ochreous, strongly with ferrous.
