= Anthela angiana =

Scientific classification
- Kingdom: Animalia
- Phylum: Arthropoda
- Class: Insecta
- Order: Lepidoptera
- Family: Anthelidae
- Genus: Anthela
- Species: A. angiana

Binomial name
- Anthela angiana oicey, Noakes & Talbot, 1915

Species of moth

Anthela angiana is a moth of the Anthelidae family. It is found in New Guinea.
