= Pseudodreata =

Scientific classification
- Kingdom: Animalia
- Phylum: Arthropoda
- Class: Insecta
- Order: Lepidoptera
- Family: Anthelidae
- Genus: Pseudodreata; Bethune-Baker, 1904

Synonyms
- Cycethra Bethune-Baker, 1904

Genus of moths

Pseudodreata is a genus of moths of the family Anthelidae. The genus was erected by George Thomas Bethune-Baker in 1904.

== Species ==
- Pseudodreata aroa Bethune-Baker, 1904
- Pseudodreata strigata Bethune-Baker, 1904
