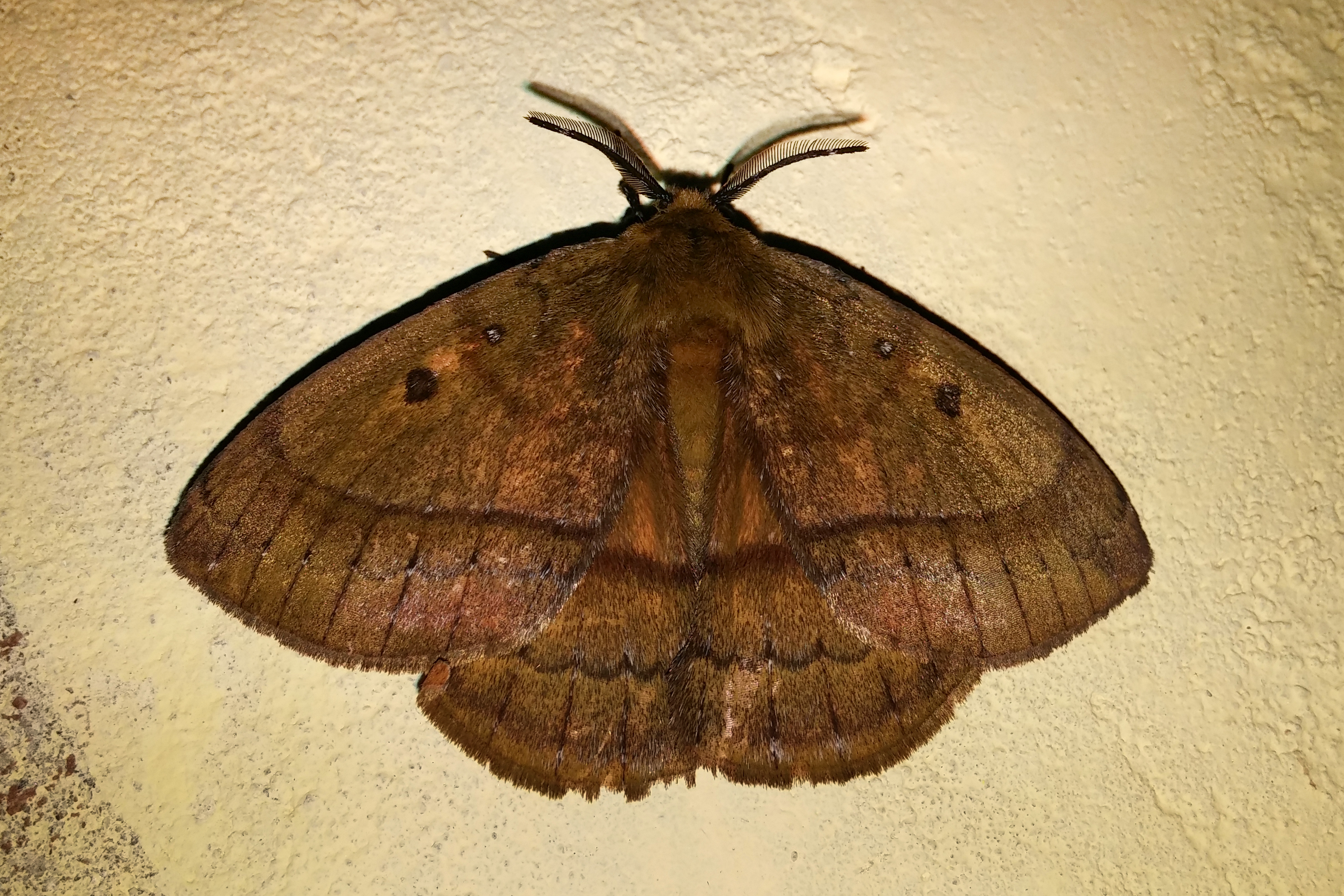

Scientific classification
- Kingdom: Animalia
- Phylum: Arthropoda
- Class: Insecta
- Order: Lepidoptera
- Family: Anthelidae
- Genus: Pseudodreata
- Species: P. strigata

Binomial name
- Pseudodreata strigata Bethune-Baker, 1904

Synonyms
- Anthela strigata Bethune-Baker, 1904

= Pseudodreata strigata =

Species of moth

Pseudodreata strigata is a moth of the Anthelidae family. It was described by George Thomas Bethune-Baker in 1904. It is found in New Guinea.
