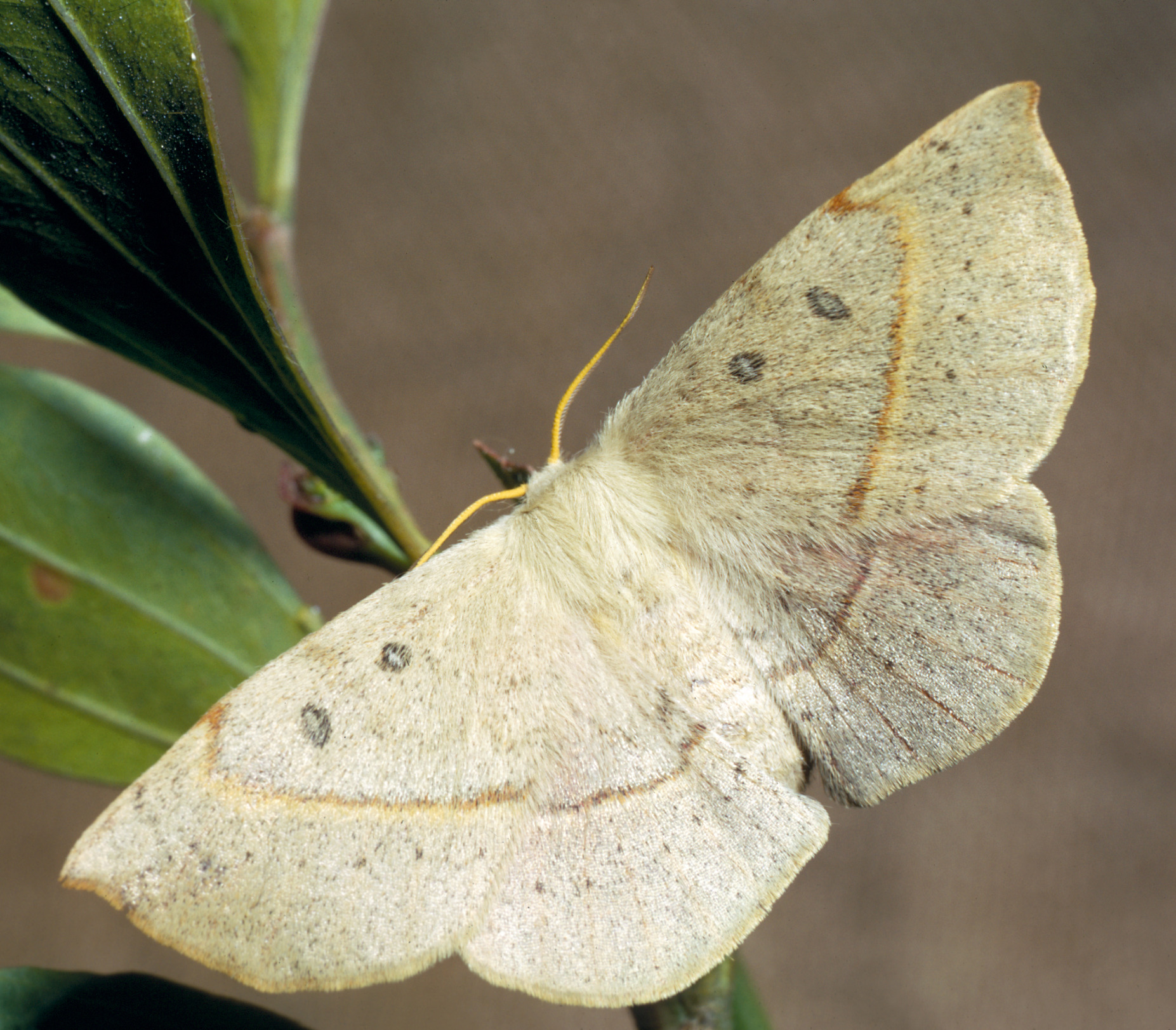

Scientific classification
- Kingdom: Animalia
- Phylum: Arthropoda
- Class: Insecta
- Order: Lepidoptera
- Family: Anthelidae
- Genus: Anthela
- Species: A. acuta

Binomial name
- Anthela acuta (Walker, 1855)

Synonyms
- Darala acuta Walker, 1855; Darala excisa Walker, 1855; Darala conspersa Walker, 1855; Darala simplex Walker, 1855; Darala plana Walker, 1855; Darala quadriplaga Walker, 1862; Ennomos potentaria Walker, 1862; Darala delineata Walker, 1865

= Anthela acuta =

Common anthelid moth

Species of moth

Anthela acuta, the common anthelid moth, is a moth of the family Anthelidae first described by Francis Walker in 1855. It is found in Australia.
