= Pseudodreata aroa =

Scientific classification
- Kingdom: Animalia
- Phylum: Arthropoda
- Class: Insecta
- Order: Lepidoptera
- Family: Anthelidae
- Genus: Pseudodreata
- Species: P. aroa

Binomial name
- Pseudodreata aroa Bethune-Baker, 1904

Synonyms
- Cycethra aroa Bethune-Baker, 1904; Anthela aroa Bethune-Baker, 1904

Species of moth

Pseudodreata aroa is a moth of the Anthelidae family. It was described by George Thomas Bethune-Baker in 1904. It is found in New Guinea.
