= Anthela roberi =

Scientific classification
- Kingdom: Animalia
- Phylum: Arthropoda
- Class: Insecta
- Order: Lepidoptera
- Family: Anthelidae
- Genus: Anthela
- Species: A. roberi

Binomial name
- Anthela roberi Niepelt, 1934

Species of moth

Anthela roberi is a moth of the Anthelidae family. It is found in New Guinea.
