= Anthela pyrrhobaphes =

Scientific classification
- Kingdom: Animalia
- Phylum: Arthropoda
- Class: Insecta
- Order: Lepidoptera
- Family: Anthelidae
- Genus: Anthela
- Species: A. pyrrhobaphes

Binomial name
- Anthela pyrrhobaphes Turner, 1926

Species of moth

Anthela pyrrhobaphes is a moth of the Anthelidae family. It is found in Australia.
