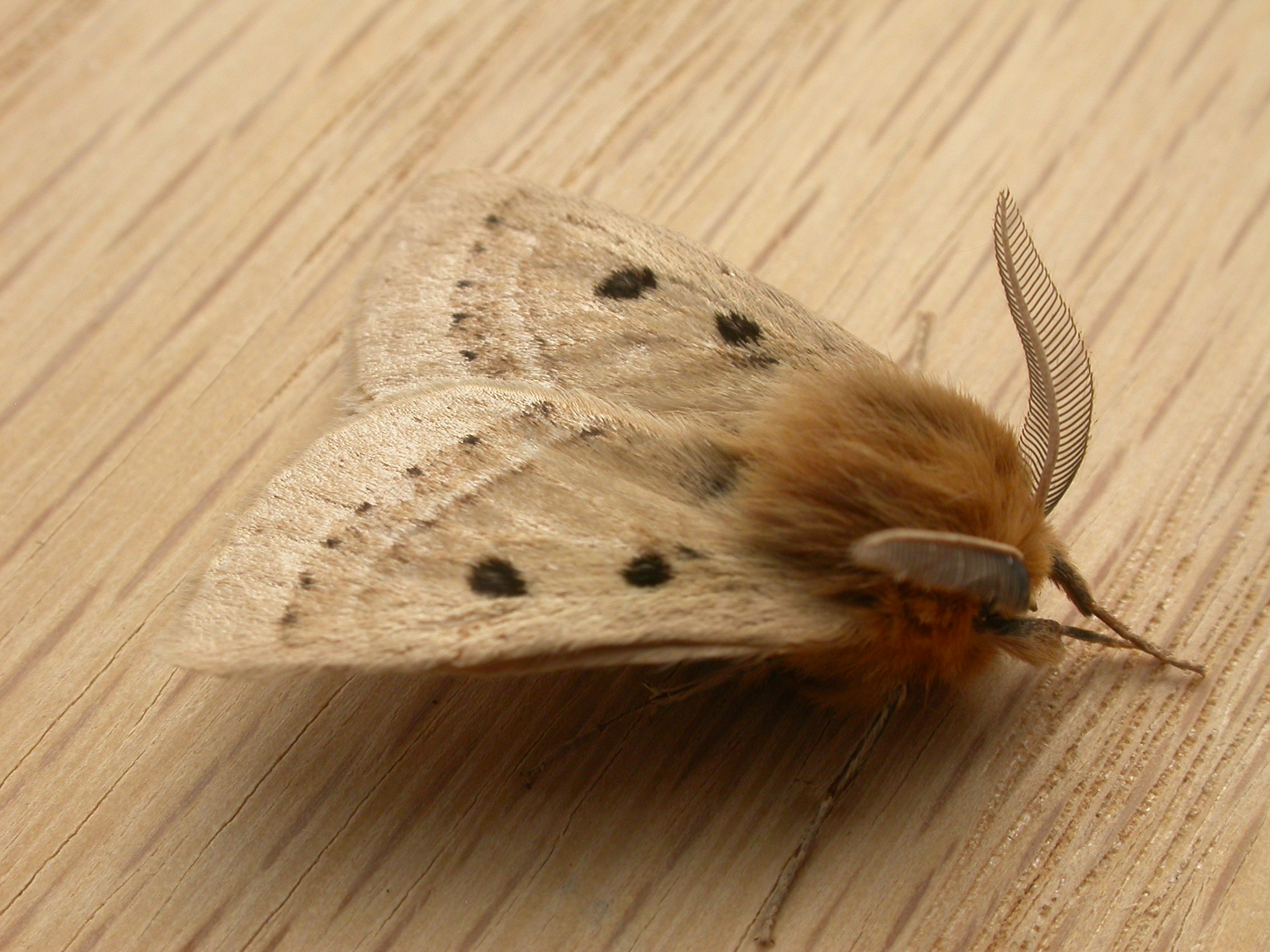

Scientific classification
- Kingdom: Animalia
- Phylum: Arthropoda
- Class: Insecta
- Order: Lepidoptera
- Family: Anthelidae
- Genus: Anthela
- Species: A. ocellata

Binomial name
- Anthela ocellata (Walker, 1855)

Synonyms
- Darala ocellata Walker, 1855; Ommatoptera tetrophthalma Herrich-Schäffer, 1856; Anthela symphona Turner, 1904; Anthela nigristigma Fawcett, 1917; Anthela dama Strand, 1929; Darala dama

= Anthela ocellata =

Eyespot anthelid

Species of moth

Anthela ocellata, the eyespot anthelid, is a moth of the family Anthelidae. The species was first described by Francis Walker in 1855. It is found in Australia, from Bundaberg to Hobart along the east coast.

The wingspan is about 60 mm.

The larvae feed on various grasses.
