= Anthela inornata =

Scientific classification
- Kingdom: Animalia
- Phylum: Arthropoda
- Class: Insecta
- Order: Lepidoptera
- Family: Anthelidae
- Genus: Anthela
- Species: A. inornata

Binomial name
- Anthela inornata (Walker, 1855)

Synonyms
- Darala inornata Walker, 1855; Darala complens Swinhoe, 1892; Anthela carneotincta Swinhoe, 1903; Anthela crenulata Swinhoe, 1903

Species of moth

Anthela inornata is a moth of the family Anthelidae. It is found in Australia.
