= Anthela callixantha =

Scientific classification
- Kingdom: Animalia
- Phylum: Arthropoda
- Class: Insecta
- Order: Lepidoptera
- Family: Anthelidae
- Genus: Anthela
- Species: A. callixantha

Binomial name
- Anthela callixantha (Lower, 1902)

Synonyms
- Darala callixantha Lower, 1902; Anthela flavala Swinhoe, 1903

Species of moth

Anthela callixantha is a moth of the Anthelidae family. It is found in Australia.
