= Anthela heliopa =

Scientific classification
- Kingdom: Animalia
- Phylum: Arthropoda
- Class: Insecta
- Order: Lepidoptera
- Family: Anthelidae
- Genus: Anthela
- Species: A. heliopa

Binomial name
- Anthela heliopa (Lower, 1902)

Synonyms
- Darala heliopa Lower, 1902; Anthela prionodes Turner, 1932

Species of moth

Anthela heliopa is a moth of the Anthelidae family. It is found in Australia.
