= Pterolocera ferrugineofusca =

Scientific classification
- Domain: Eukaryota
- Kingdom: Animalia
- Phylum: Arthropoda
- Class: Insecta
- Order: Lepidoptera
- Family: Anthelidae
- Genus: Pterolocera
- Species: P. ferrugineofusca

Binomial name
- Pterolocera ferrugineofusca Strand, 1925

Synonyms
- Pterolocera similis Swinhoe, 1922; Pterolocera similis Hulstaert, 1928; Pterolocera similis Bryk, 1934

Species of moth

Pterolocera ferrugineofusca is a moth of the Anthelidae family. It was described by Strand in 1925. It is found in Australia.
