= Anthela reltoni =

Scientific classification
- Kingdom: Animalia
- Phylum: Arthropoda
- Class: Insecta
- Order: Lepidoptera
- Family: Anthelidae
- Genus: Anthela
- Species: A. reltoni

Binomial name
- Anthela reltoni (T.P. Lucas, 1895)

Synonyms
- Darala reltoni Lucas, 1895; Anthela pyromacula Lower, 1905

Species of moth

Anthela reltoni is a moth of the Anthelidae family. It is found in Australia.
