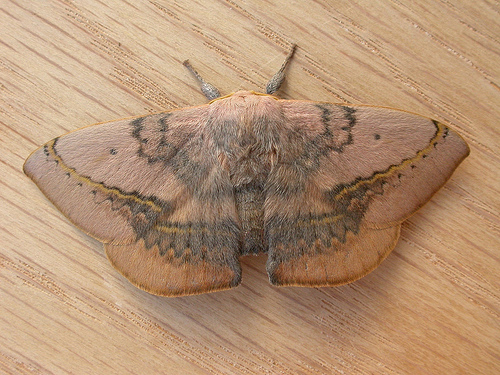

Scientific classification
- Kingdom: Animalia
- Phylum: Arthropoda
- Class: Insecta
- Order: Lepidoptera
- Family: Anthelidae
- Genus: Anthela
- Species: A. varia

Binomial name
- Anthela varia (Walker, 1855)

Synonyms
- Darala varia Walker, 1855; Darala hamata Walker, 1855; Darala humata Turner, 1921; Colussa odenestaria Walker, 1860; Eulophocampe amoena Scott, 1893; Darala pinguis Walker, 1865

= Anthela varia =

Variable anthelid

Species of moth

Anthela varia, the variable anthelid, is a moth of the family Anthelidae. The species was first described by Francis Walker in 1855. It is found in the coastal areas of southern Western Australia, southern Queensland, New South Wales, and Victoria.

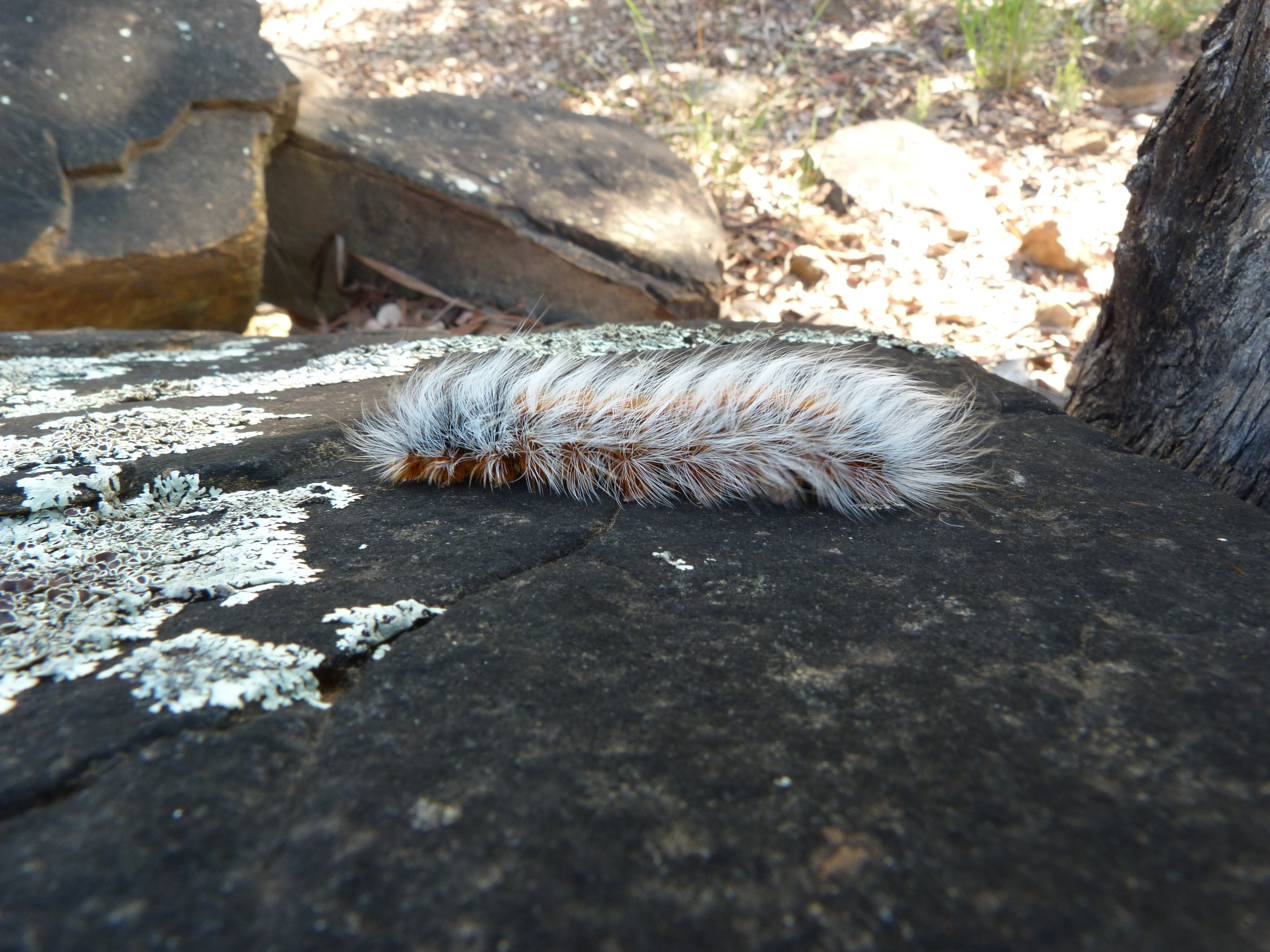
Caterpillar

The wingspan can range up to 90 mm for females.

The larvae, commonly called the hairy mary caterpillar, feeds on Macadamia integrifolia, Eucalyptus, Grevillea and Stenocarpus species.
