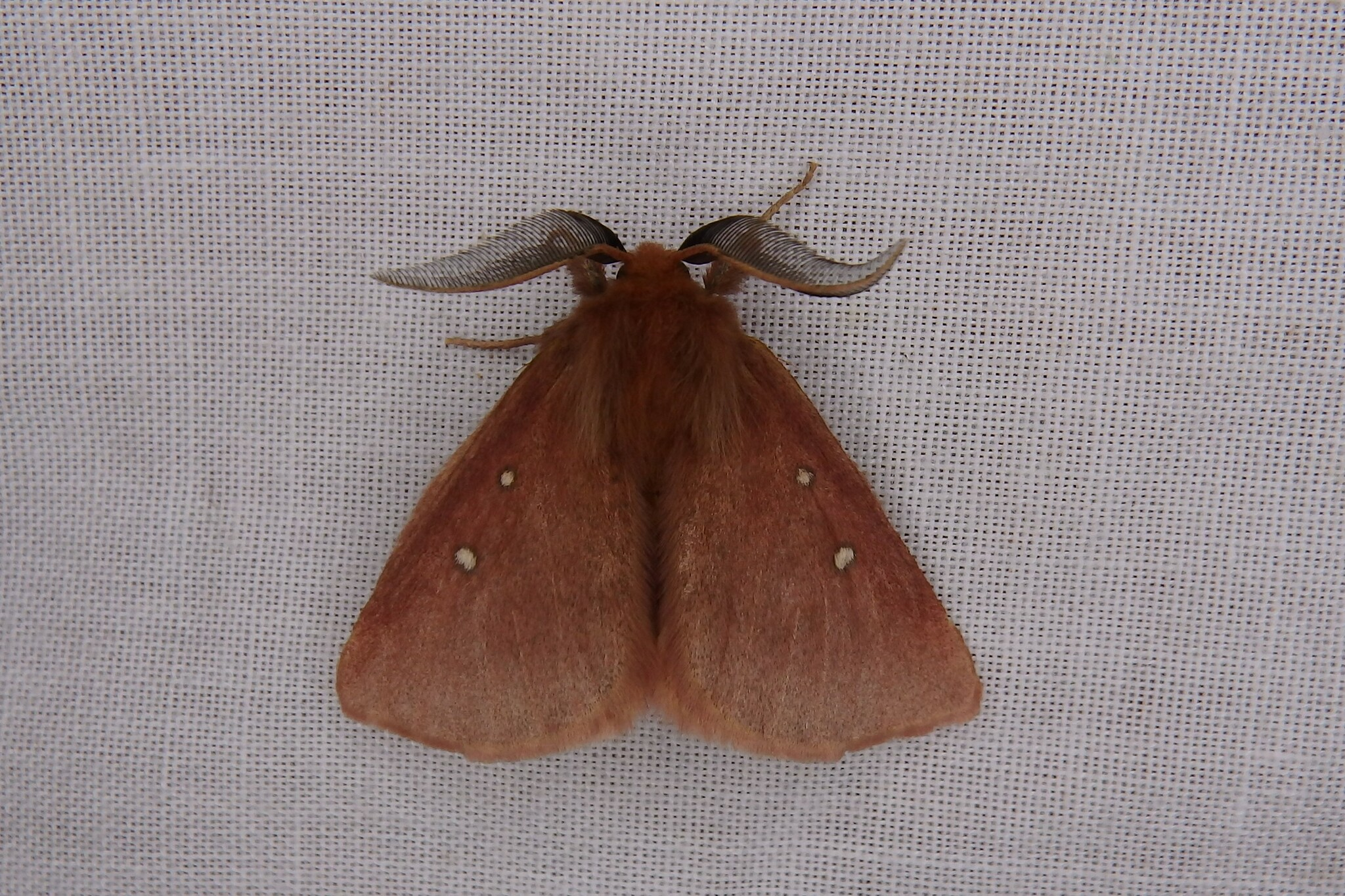

Scientific classification
- Kingdom: Animalia
- Phylum: Arthropoda
- Class: Insecta
- Order: Lepidoptera
- Family: Anthelidae
- Genus: Anthela
- Species: A. asterias

Binomial name
- Anthela asterias (Meyrick, 1891)

Synonyms
- Darala asterias Meyrick, 1891; Darala uniformis Swinhoe, 1892; Anthela niphomacula Lower, 1905

= Anthela asterias =

Species of moth

Anthela asterias is a species of moth of the family Anthelidae. It is found in Australia.
