= Anthela stygiana =

Scientific classification
- Kingdom: Animalia
- Phylum: Arthropoda
- Class: Insecta
- Order: Lepidoptera
- Family: Anthelidae
- Genus: Anthela
- Species: A. stygiana

Binomial name
- Anthela stygiana (Butler, 1882)

Synonyms
- Darala stygiana Butler, 1882; Darala magnifica Lucas, 1891

Species of moth

Anthela stygiana is a moth of the family Anthelidae. It is found in Australia.
