= Anthela exoleta =

Scientific classification
- Kingdom: Animalia
- Phylum: Arthropoda
- Class: Insecta
- Order: Lepidoptera
- Family: Anthelidae
- Genus: Anthela
- Species: A. exoleta

Binomial name
- Anthela exoleta (C. Swinhoe, 1892)

Synonyms
- Aroa exoleta C. Swinhoe, 1892; Darala figlina C. Swinhoe, 1902; Anthela glauerti Turner, 1939

Species of moth

Anthela exoleta is a moth of the family Anthelidae first described by Charles Swinhoe in 1892. It is found in Australia.
