= Anthela guenei =

Scientific classification
- Kingdom: Animalia
- Phylum: Arthropoda
- Clade: Pancrustacea
- Class: Insecta
- Order: Lepidoptera
- Family: Anthelidae
- Genus: Anthela
- Species: A. guenei

Binomial name
- Anthela guenei (Newman, 1856)

Synonyms
- Teara guenei Newman, 1856; Teara gueneei Tillyard, 1926

Species of moth

Anthela guenei is a moth of the Anthelidae family. It was described by Newman in 1856. It is found in Australia.
