= Anthela decolor =

Scientific classification
- Kingdom: Animalia
- Phylum: Arthropoda
- Class: Insecta
- Order: Lepidoptera
- Family: Anthelidae
- Genus: Anthela
- Species: A. decolor

Binomial name
- Anthela decolor Turner, 1939

Species of moth

Anthela decolor is a moth of the family Anthelidae. It is found in Australia.
