= Anthela clementi =

Scientific classification
- Kingdom: Animalia
- Phylum: Arthropoda
- Class: Insecta
- Order: Lepidoptera
- Family: Anthelidae
- Genus: Anthela
- Species: A. clementi

Binomial name
- Anthela clementi (C. Swinhoe, 1902)

Synonyms
- Darala clementi C. Swinhoe, 1902; Darala clementsi Lower, 1917

Species of moth

Anthela clementi is a moth of the family Anthelidae first described by Charles Swinhoe in 1902. It is found in Australia.
