= Anthela cnecias =

Scientific classification
- Kingdom: Animalia
- Phylum: Arthropoda
- Class: Insecta
- Order: Lepidoptera
- Family: Anthelidae
- Genus: Anthela
- Species: A. cnecias

Binomial name
- Anthela cnecias Turner, 1921

Synonyms
- Anthela tasmaniensis Strand, 1929

Species of moth

Anthela cnecias is a moth of the family Anthelidae. It is found in Australia.
