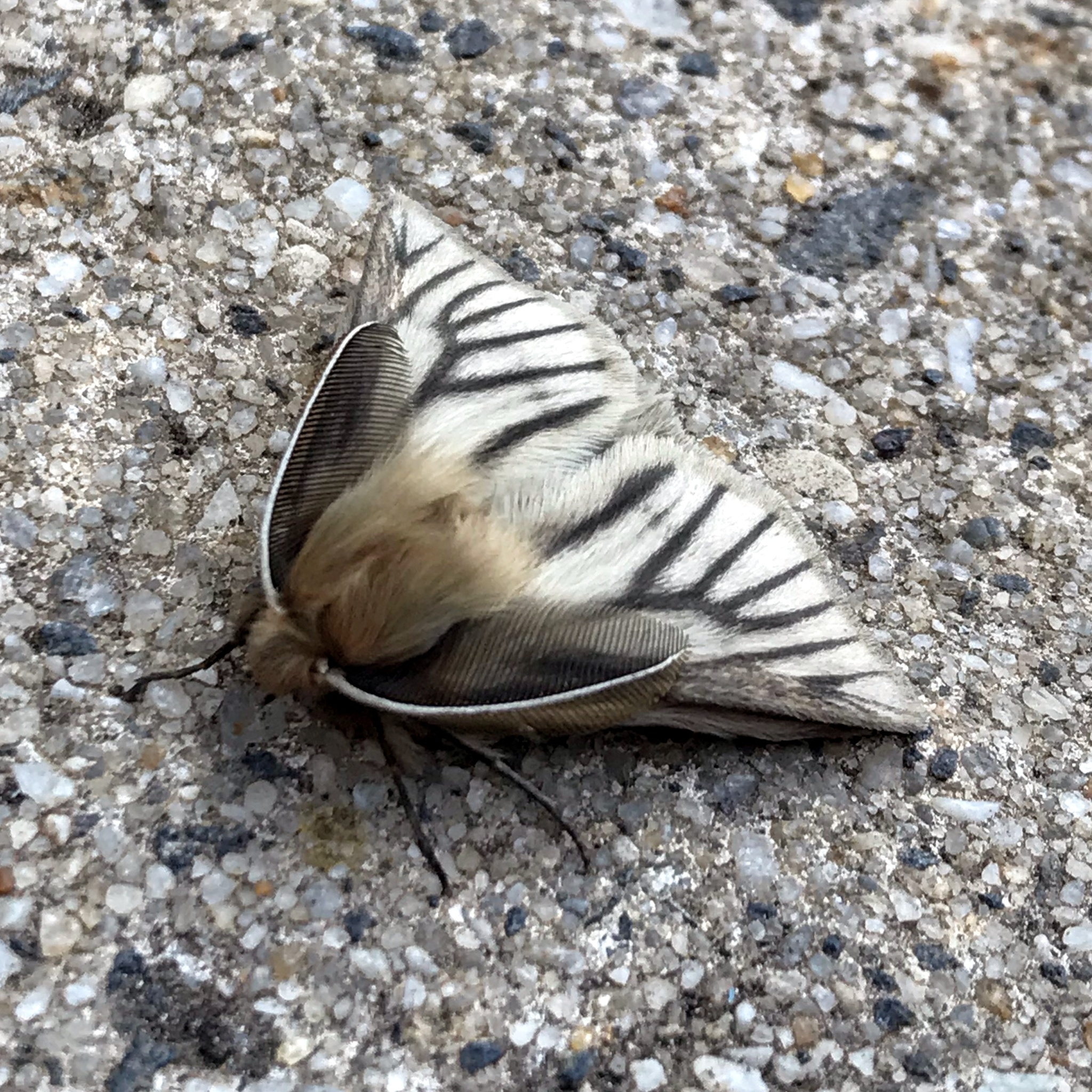

Scientific classification
- Kingdom: Animalia
- Phylum: Arthropoda
- Class: Insecta
- Order: Lepidoptera
- Family: Anthelidae
- Genus: Pterolocera
- Species: P. amplicornis

Binomial name
- Pterolocera amplicornis Walker, 1855

= Pterolocera amplicornis =

Species of moth

Pterolocera amplicornis is a moth of the family Anthelidae. It was described by Francis Walker in 1855. It is found in Australia.
