= Anthela limonea =

Scientific classification
- Kingdom: Animalia
- Phylum: Arthropoda
- Class: Insecta
- Order: Lepidoptera
- Family: Anthelidae
- Genus: Anthela
- Species: A. limonea

Binomial name
- Anthela limonea (Butler, 1874)

Synonyms
- Darala limonea Butler, 1874

Species of moth

Anthela limonea is a moth of the Anthelidae family. It is found in Australia.

The initial instars of its caterpillar form have black dorsal markings and have a yellow body.
