= Anthela allocota =

Scientific classification
- Kingdom: Animalia
- Phylum: Arthropoda
- Class: Insecta
- Order: Lepidoptera
- Family: Anthelidae
- Genus: Anthela
- Species: A. allocota

Binomial name
- Anthela allocota Turner, 1921

Species of moth

Anthela allocota is a moth of the Anthelidae family. It is found in Australia.
