= Anthela euryphrica =

Scientific classification
- Kingdom: Animalia
- Phylum: Arthropoda
- Class: Insecta
- Order: Lepidoptera
- Family: Anthelidae
- Genus: Anthela
- Species: A. euryphrica

Binomial name
- Anthela euryphrica Turner, 1936

Species of moth

Anthela euryphrica is a moth of the Anthelidae family. It is found in Australia.
