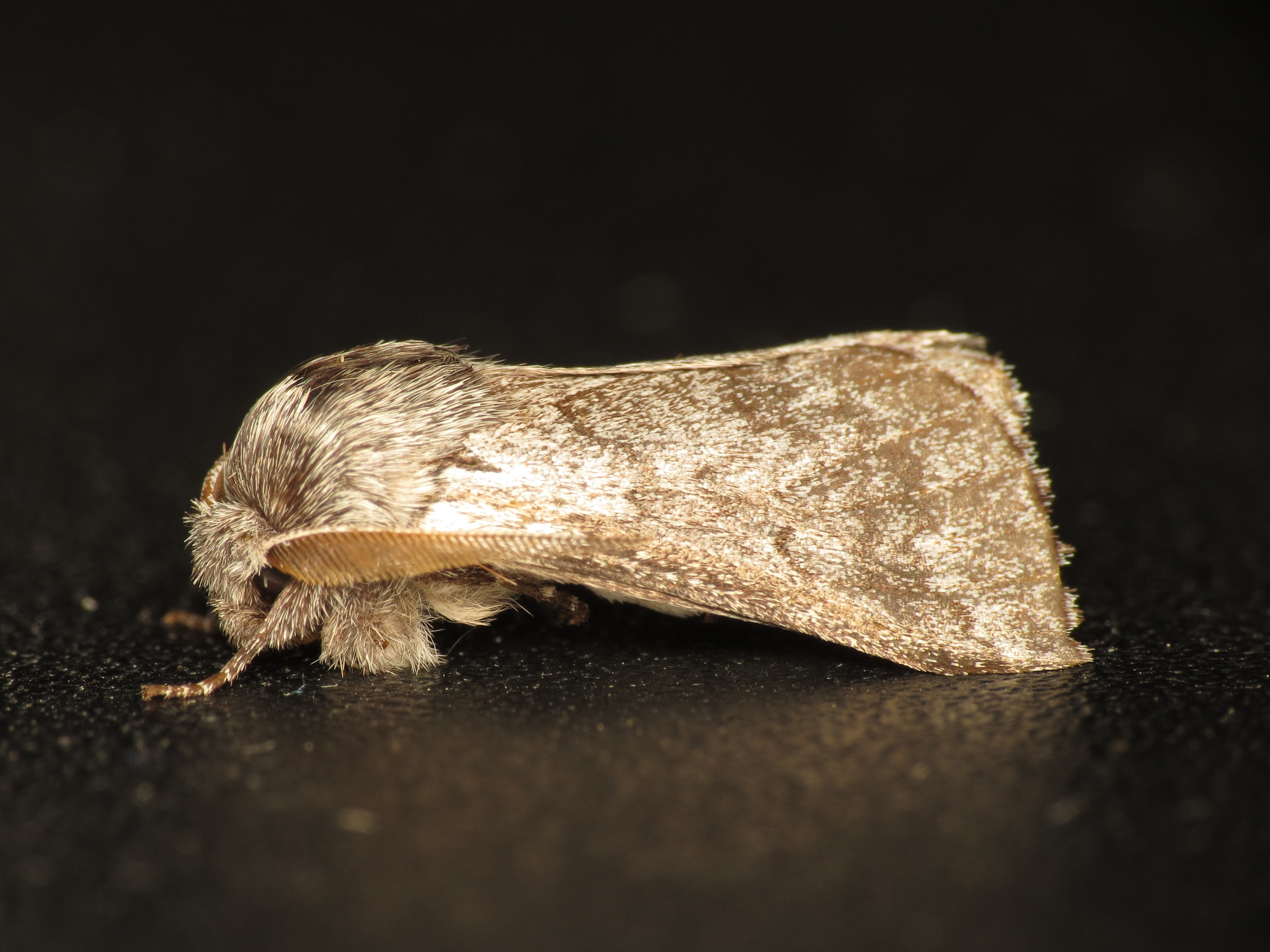

Scientific classification
- Kingdom: Animalia
- Phylum: Arthropoda
- Class: Insecta
- Order: Lepidoptera
- Family: Anthelidae
- Genus: Munychryia
- Species: M. senicula

Binomial name
- Munychryia senicula Walker, 1865

Synonyms
- Hypochroma nyssiata Felder & Rogenhofer, 1875

= Munychryia senicula =

Species of moth

Munychryia senicula is a moth of the family Anthelidae. It was described by Francis Walker in 1865. It is found in Australia.
