= Anthela astata =

Scientific classification
- Kingdom: Animalia
- Phylum: Arthropoda
- Class: Insecta
- Order: Lepidoptera
- Family: Anthelidae
- Genus: Anthela
- Species: A. astata

Binomial name
- Anthela astata Turner, 1926

Synonyms
- Darala cinerascens Grünberg, 1914; Darala rufifascia Walker, 1865; Anthela cervinella Strand, 1929

Species of moth

Anthela astata is a moth of the family Anthelidae. It is found in Australia.
