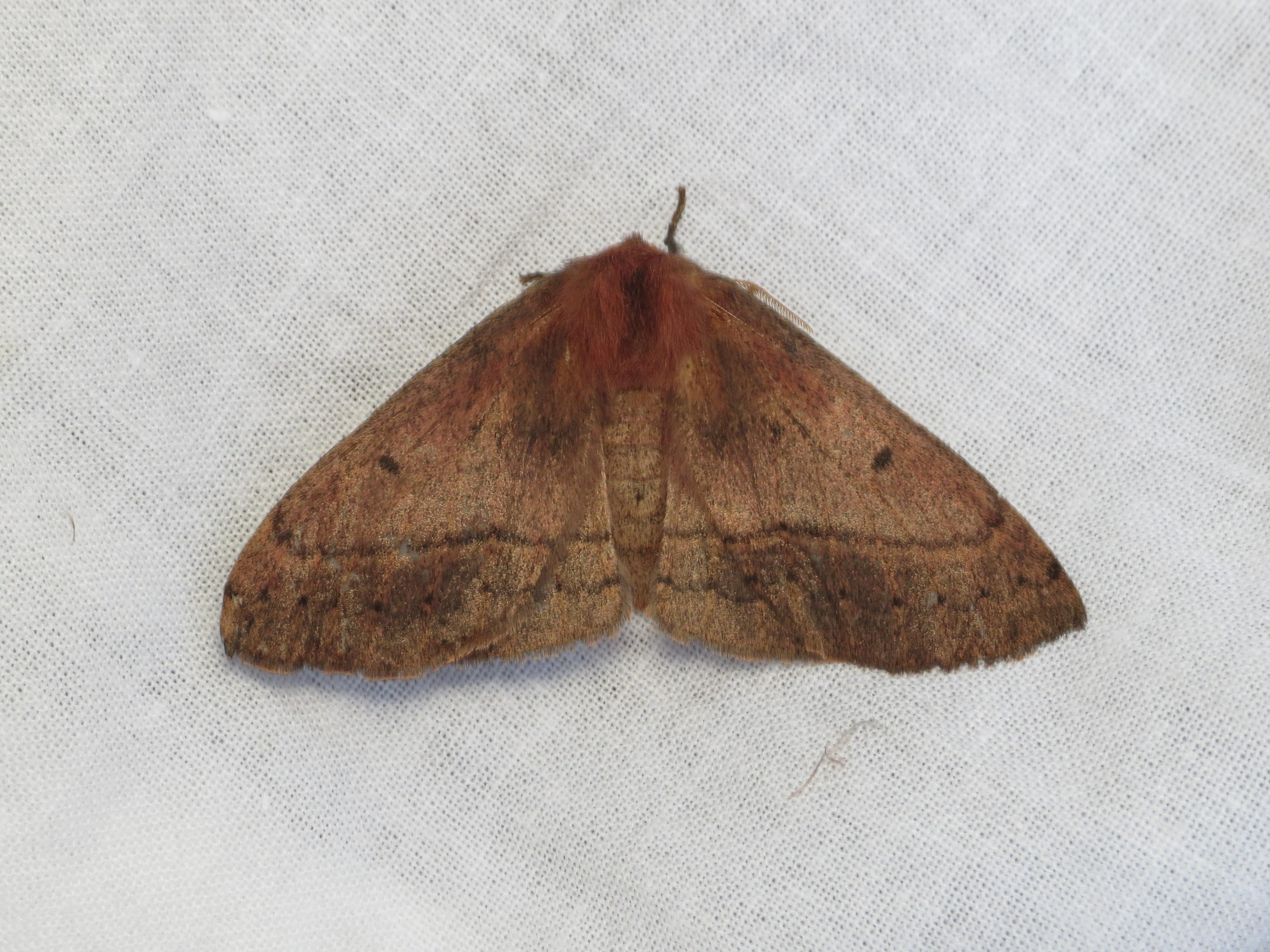

Scientific classification
- Kingdom: Animalia
- Phylum: Arthropoda
- Class: Insecta
- Order: Lepidoptera
- Family: Anthelidae
- Genus: Anthela
- Species: A. repleta

Binomial name
- Anthela repleta (Walker, 1855)

Synonyms
- Darala repleta Walker, 1855; Ommatoptera diophthalma Herrich-Schäffer, 1856; Anthela repletana Strand, E. 1929

= Anthela repleta =

Species of moth

Anthela repleta is a moth of the family Anthelidae. It is found in Australia.
