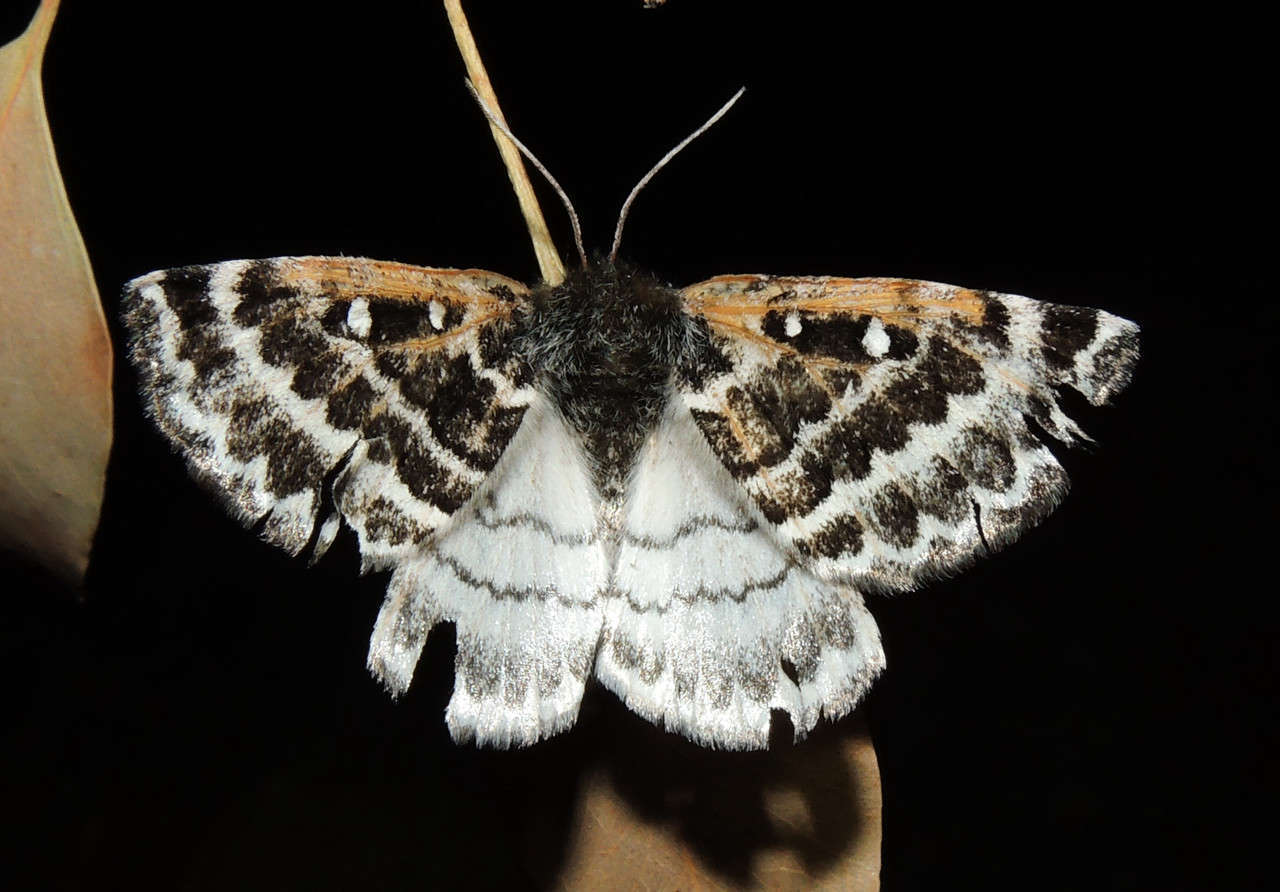

Scientific classification
- Kingdom: Animalia
- Phylum: Arthropoda
- Clade: Pancrustacea
- Class: Insecta
- Order: Lepidoptera
- Family: Anthelidae
- Genus: Anthela
- Species: A. denticulata

Binomial name
- Anthela denticulata (Newman, 1856)

Synonyms
- Teara denticulata Newman, 1856

= Anthela denticulata =

Species of moth

Anthela denticulata is a moth of the Anthelidae family. It is found in Australia.
