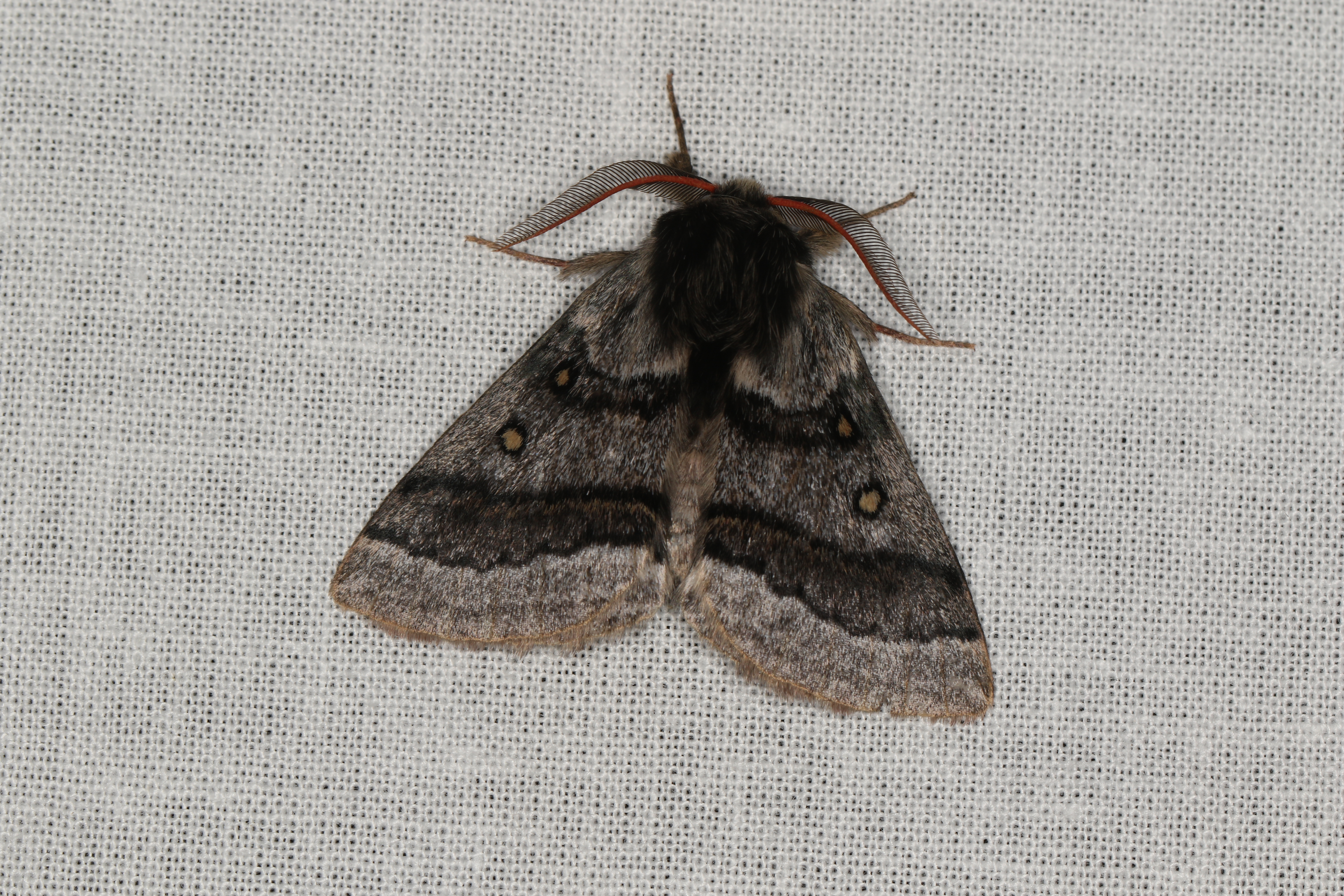

Scientific classification
- Kingdom: Animalia
- Phylum: Arthropoda
- Class: Insecta
- Order: Lepidoptera
- Family: Anthelidae
- Genus: Anthela
- Species: A. tetraphrica

Binomial name
- Anthela tetraphrica Turner, 1921

Synonyms
- Anthela tetraphica Hulstaert, 1928

= Anthela tetraphrica =

Species of moth

Anthela tetraphrica is a moth of the Anthelidae family. It is found in Australia.
