= Anthela subfalcata =

Scientific classification
- Kingdom: Animalia
- Phylum: Arthropoda
- Class: Insecta
- Order: Lepidoptera
- Family: Anthelidae
- Genus: Anthela
- Species: A. subfalcata

Binomial name
- Anthela subfalcata (Walker, 1855)

Synonyms
- Darala subfalcata Walker, 1855; Darala ferruginea Walker, 1855; Darala myrti Herrich-Schäffer, 1858; Anthela phaeozona Turner, 1926

Species of moth

Anthela subfalcata is a moth of the family Anthelidae. It is found in Australia.
