= Anthela rubeola =

Scientific classification
- Kingdom: Animalia
- Phylum: Arthropoda
- Class: Insecta
- Order: Lepidoptera
- Family: Anthelidae
- Genus: Anthela
- Species: A. rubeola

Binomial name
- Anthela rubeola (Felder, 1874)

Synonyms
- Darala rubeola Felder & Rogenhofer, 1874; Darala haemoptera Lower, 1893

Species of moth

Anthela rubeola is a moth of the family Anthelidae. It is found in Australia.
