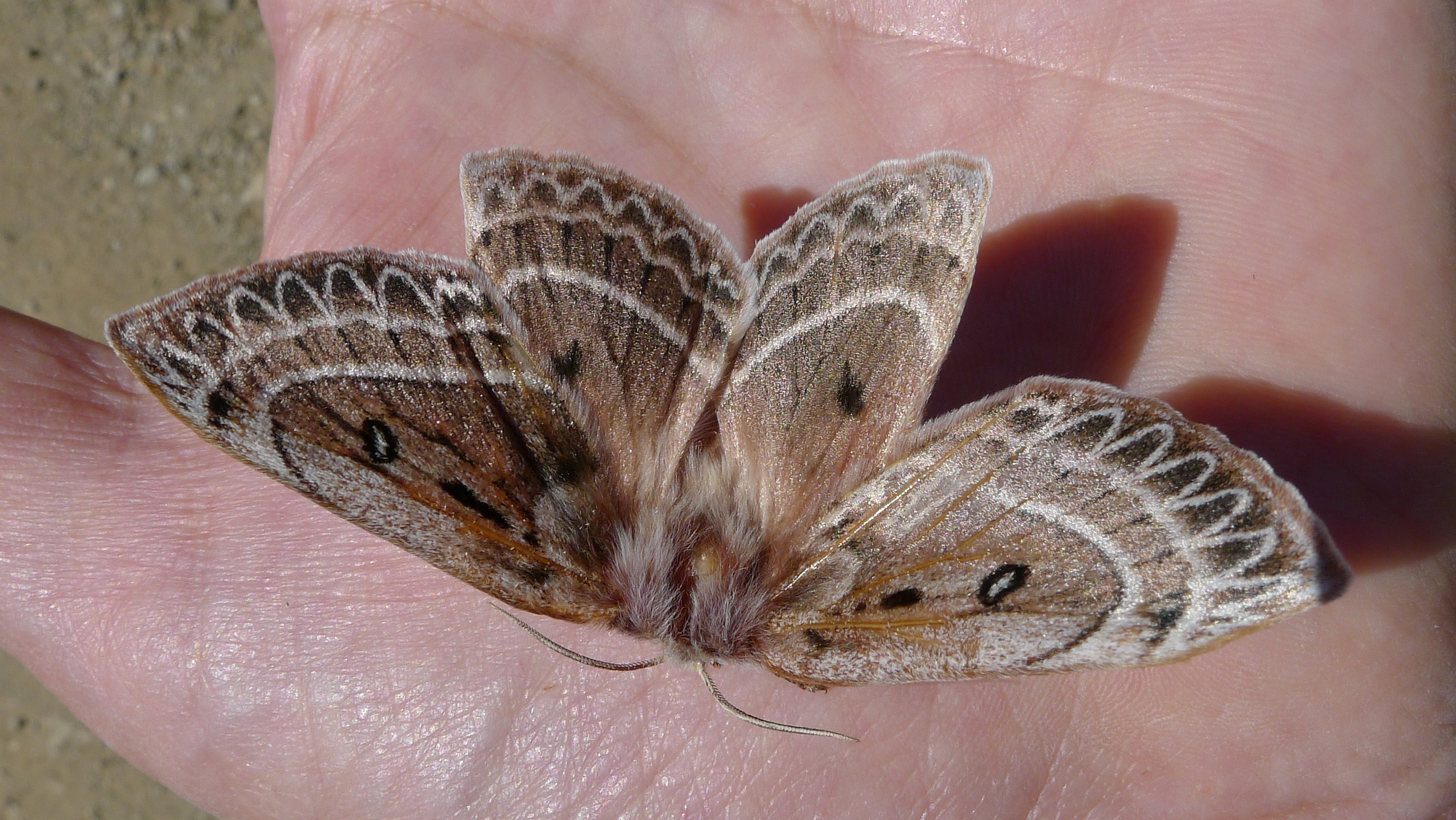

Scientific classification
- Kingdom: Animalia
- Phylum: Arthropoda
- Class: Insecta
- Order: Lepidoptera
- Family: Anthelidae
- Genus: Anthela
- Species: A. oressarcha

Binomial name
- Anthela oressarcha Turner, 1921

= Anthela oressarcha =

Species of moth

Anthela oressarcha is a species of moth in the family Anthelidae. It is found in Australia.
