= Anthela basigera =

Scientific classification
- Kingdom: Animalia
- Phylum: Arthropoda
- Class: Insecta
- Order: Lepidoptera
- Family: Anthelidae
- Genus: Anthela
- Species: A. basigera

Binomial name
- Anthela basigera (Walker, 1865)

Synonyms
- Darala basigera Walker, 1865; Darala undulata Felder, R. & Rogenhofer, 1874

Species of moth

Anthela basigera is a moth of the family Anthelidae. It is found in Australia.
