= Anthela postica =

Scientific classification
- Kingdom: Animalia
- Phylum: Arthropoda
- Class: Insecta
- Order: Lepidoptera
- Family: Anthelidae
- Genus: Anthela
- Species: A. postica

Binomial name
- Anthela postica (Walker, 1855)

Synonyms
- Darala postica Walker, 1855; Anthela callicesta Turner, 1924

Species of moth

Anthela postica is a moth of the Anthelidae family. It is found in Australia.
