= Anthela unisigna =

Scientific classification
- Kingdom: Animalia
- Phylum: Arthropoda
- Class: Insecta
- Order: Lepidoptera
- Family: Anthelidae
- Genus: Anthela
- Species: A. unisigna

Binomial name
- Anthela unisigna C. Swinhoe, 1903

Species of moth

Anthela unisigna is a moth of the family Anthelidae first described by Charles Swinhoe in 1903. It is found in Australia.
