= Pterolocera insignis =

Scientific classification
- Domain: Eukaryota
- Kingdom: Animalia
- Phylum: Arthropoda
- Class: Insecta
- Order: Lepidoptera
- Family: Anthelidae
- Genus: Pterolocera
- Species: P. insignis

Binomial name
- Pterolocera insignis Herrich-Schäffer, [1856]

Synonyms
- Ptilophora insignis Herrich-Schäffer, 1856

Species of moth

Pterolocera insignis is a moth of the family Anthelidae. It was described by Gottlieb August Wilhelm Herrich-Schäffer in 1856. It is found in Australia.
