= Anthela connexa =

Scientific classification
- Kingdom: Animalia
- Phylum: Arthropoda
- Class: Insecta
- Order: Lepidoptera
- Family: Anthelidae
- Genus: Anthela
- Species: A. connexa

Binomial name
- Anthela connexa (Walker, 1855)

Synonyms
- Darala connexa Walker, 1855; Darala fervens Walker, 1855; Darala zonata Felder & Rogenhofer, 1874

Species of moth

Anthela connexa is a moth of the family Anthelidae. It is found in Australia.
