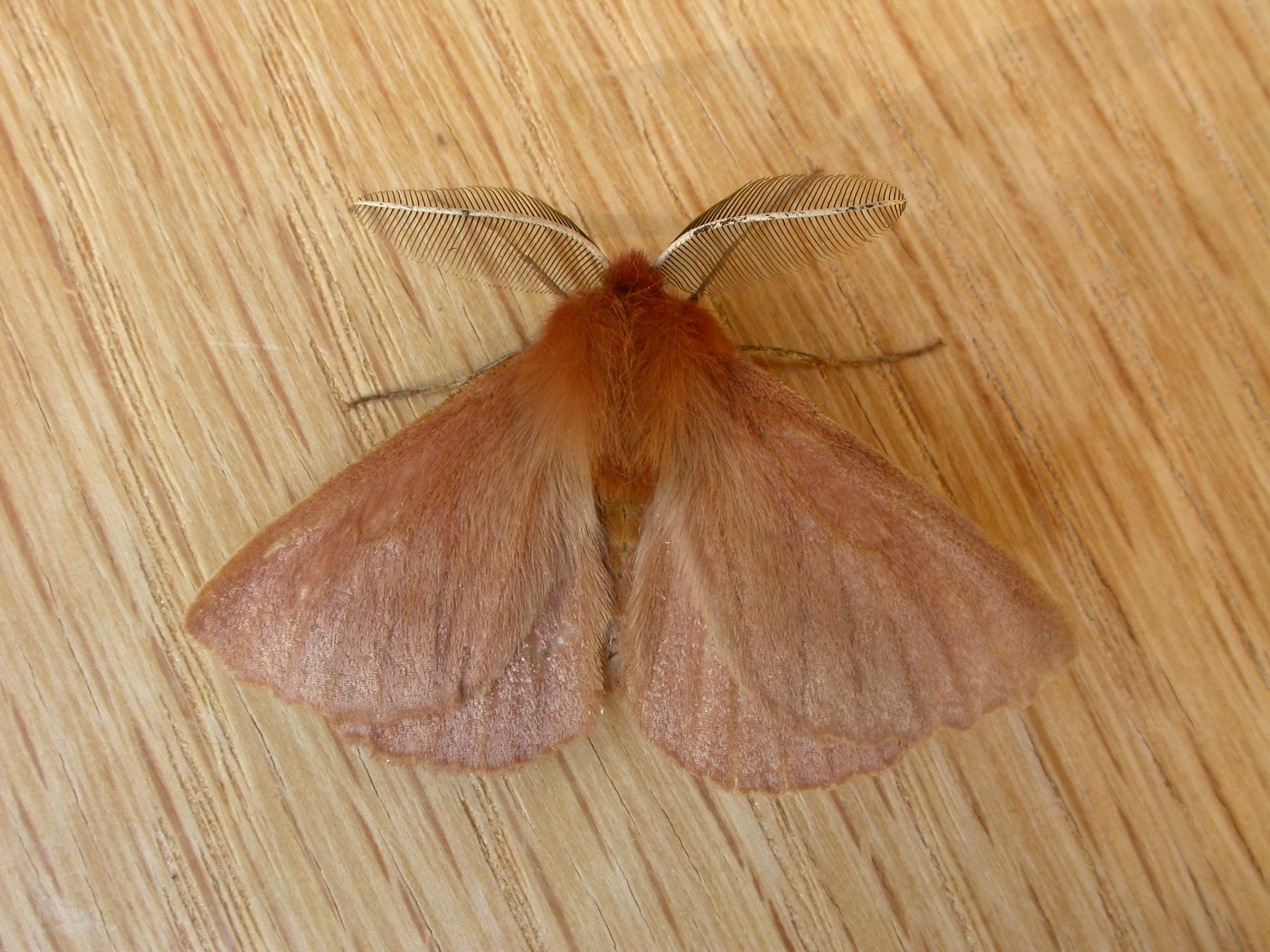

Scientific classification
- Domain: Eukaryota
- Kingdom: Animalia
- Phylum: Arthropoda
- Class: Insecta
- Order: Lepidoptera
- Family: Anthelidae
- Genus: Pterolocera
- Species: P. leucocera

Binomial name
- Pterolocera leucocera Turner, 1921

Synonyms
- Anthela leucocera

= Pterolocera leucocera =

Species of moth

Pterolocera leucocera is a species of moth of the family Anthelidae. It is found in New South Wales, Victoria and Tasmania.

The wingspan is about 50 mm for males. The females are unable to fly.
