= Anthela phoenicias =

Scientific classification
- Kingdom: Animalia
- Phylum: Arthropoda
- Class: Insecta
- Order: Lepidoptera
- Family: Anthelidae
- Genus: Anthela
- Species: A. phoenicias

Binomial name
- Anthela phoenicias Turner, 1902

Synonyms
- Anthela aspilota Turner, 1902

Species of moth

Anthela phoenicias is a moth of the Anthelidae family. It is found in Australia.
