= Pterolocera ferruginea =

Scientific classification
- Domain: Eukaryota
- Kingdom: Animalia
- Phylum: Arthropoda
- Class: Insecta
- Order: Lepidoptera
- Family: Anthelidae
- Genus: Pterolocera
- Species: P. ferruginea

Binomial name
- Pterolocera ferruginea Strand, 1926

Species of moth

Pterolocera ferruginea is a moth of the Anthelidae family. It was described by Strand in 1926. It is found in Australia.
