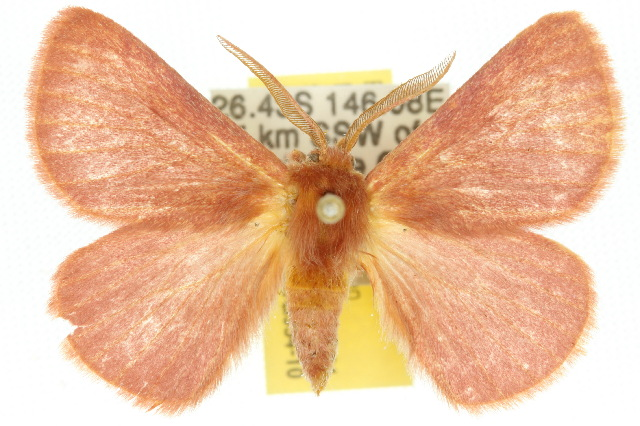

Scientific classification
- Kingdom: Animalia
- Phylum: Arthropoda
- Class: Insecta
- Order: Lepidoptera
- Family: Anthelidae
- Genus: Anthela
- Species: A. adriana

Binomial name
- Anthela adriana (Swinhoe, 1902)

Synonyms
- Darala adriana Swinhoe, C. 1902

= Anthela adriana =

Species of moth

Anthela adriana is a moth of the family Anthelidae. It is found in Australia.
