= Anthela deficiens =

Scientific classification
- Kingdom: Animalia
- Phylum: Arthropoda
- Class: Insecta
- Order: Lepidoptera
- Family: Anthelidae
- Genus: Anthela
- Species: A. deficiens

Binomial name
- Anthela deficiens (Walker, 1865)

Synonyms
- Dreata deficiens Walker, 1865

Species of moth

Anthela deficiens is a moth of the Anthelidae family. It is found in Australia.
