= Pterolocera elizabetha =

Scientific classification
- Domain: Eukaryota
- Kingdom: Animalia
- Phylum: Arthropoda
- Class: Insecta
- Order: Lepidoptera
- Family: Anthelidae
- Genus: Pterolocera
- Species: P. elizabetha

Binomial name
- Pterolocera elizabetha (White, 1841)

Synonyms
- Odonestis elizabetha White, 1841; Odonestis elisabetha Strand, 1929

Species of moth

Pterolocera elizabetha is a moth of the Anthelidae family. It is found in Australia.
