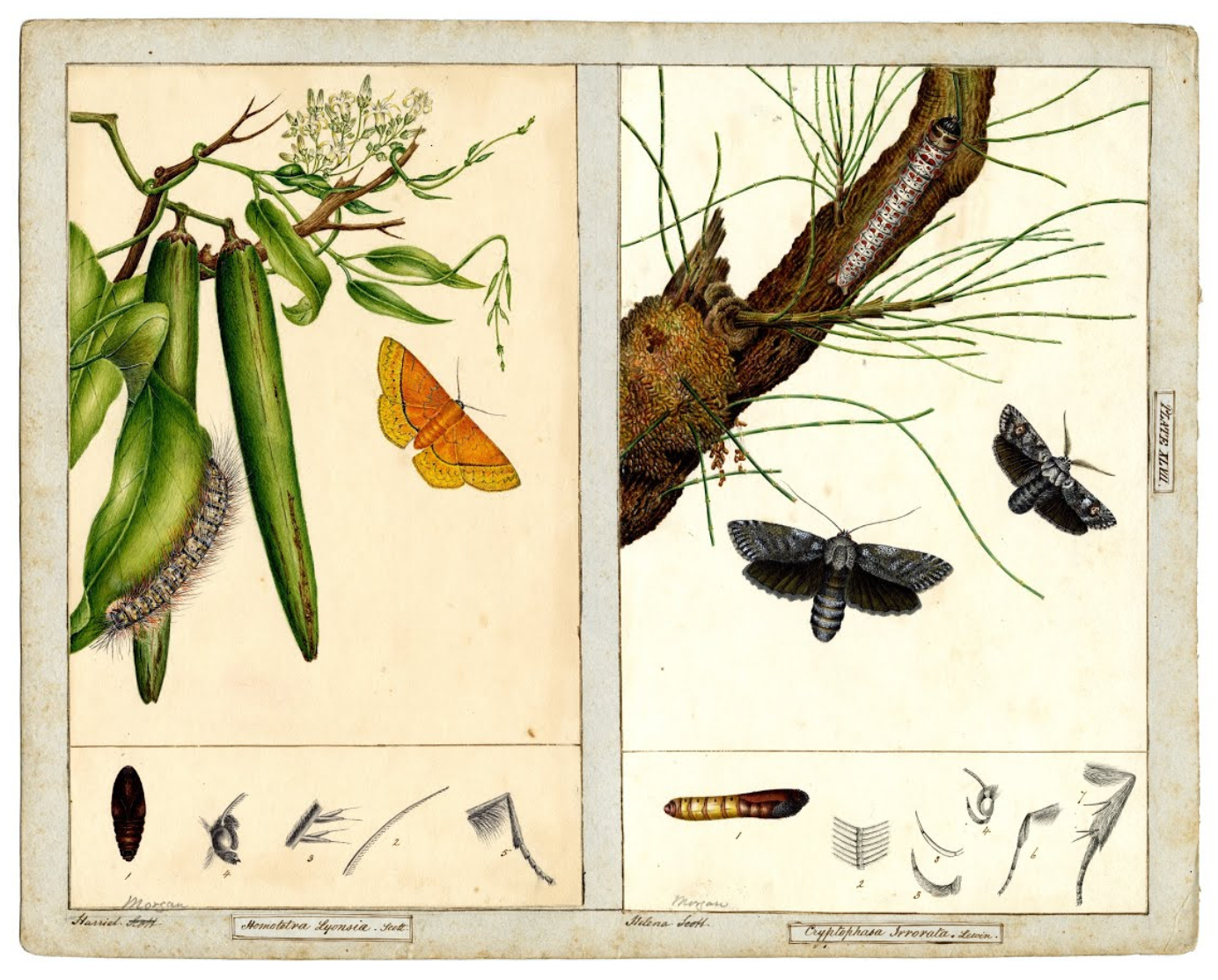

Scientific classification
- Kingdom: Animalia
- Phylum: Arthropoda
- Class: Insecta
- Order: Lepidoptera
- Family: Anthelidae
- Genus: Anthela
- Species: A. excellens

Binomial name
- Anthela excellens (Walker, 1855)

Synonyms
- Darala excellens Walker, 1855; Darala integra Walker, 1855; Dreata caniceps Walker, 1862

= Anthela excellens =

Species of moth

Anthela excellens is a moth of the Anthelidae family. It is found in Australia.
