= Anthela callileuca =

Scientific classification
- Kingdom: Animalia
- Phylum: Arthropoda
- Class: Insecta
- Order: Lepidoptera
- Family: Anthelidae
- Genus: Anthela
- Species: A. callileuca

Binomial name
- Anthela callileuca Turner, 1922

Species of moth

Anthela callileuca is a moth of the Anthelidae family. It is found in Australia.
