= Pterolocera isogama =

Scientific classification
- Domain: Eukaryota
- Kingdom: Animalia
- Phylum: Arthropoda
- Class: Insecta
- Order: Lepidoptera
- Family: Anthelidae
- Genus: Pterolocera
- Species: P. isogama

Binomial name
- Pterolocera isogama Turner, 1931

Species of moth

Pterolocera isogama is a moth of the family Anthelidae. It was described by Alfred Jefferis Turner in 1931. It is found in Australia.
