= Munychryia periclyta =

Scientific classification
- Kingdom: Animalia
- Phylum: Arthropoda
- Class: Insecta
- Order: Lepidoptera
- Family: Anthelidae
- Genus: Munychryia
- Species: M. periclyta

Binomial name
- Munychryia periclyta Common & McFarland, 1970

Species of moth

Munychryia periclyta is a moth of the Anthelidae family. It was described by Ian Francis Bell Common and Noel McFarland in 1970. It is found in Australia.
