= Anthela xanthocera =

Scientific classification
- Kingdom: Animalia
- Phylum: Arthropoda
- Class: Insecta
- Order: Lepidoptera
- Family: Anthelidae
- Genus: Anthela
- Species: A. xanthocera

Binomial name
- Anthela xanthocera Turner, 1922

Species of moth

Anthela xanthocera is a moth of the Anthelidae family. It is found in Australia.
