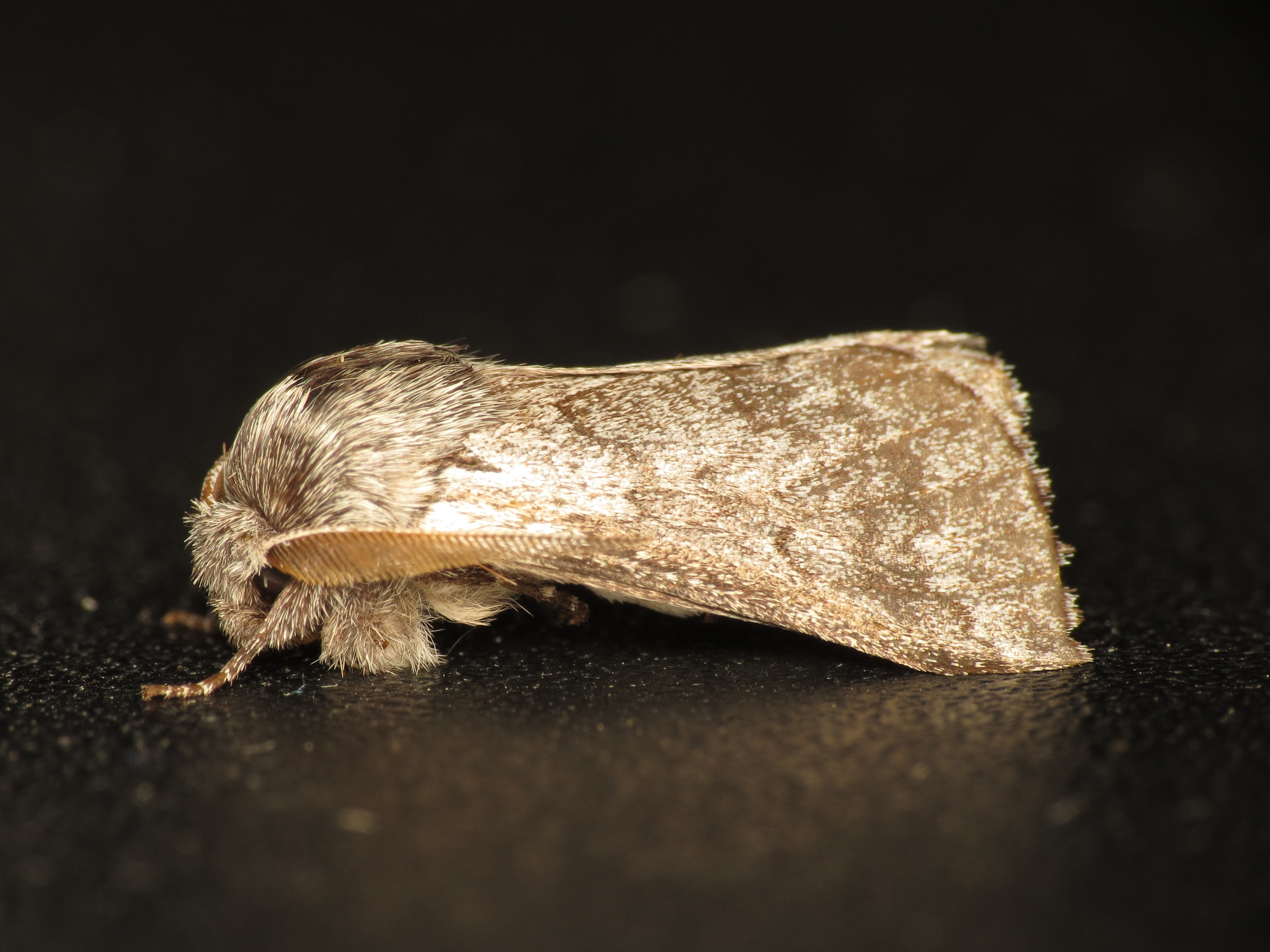
- Munychryia senicula

Scientific classification
- Kingdom: Animalia
- Phylum: Arthropoda
- Class: Insecta
- Order: Lepidoptera
- Family: Anthelidae
- Genus: Munychryia; Walker, 1865

= Munychryia =

Genus of moths

Munychryia is a genus of moths of the Anthelidae family.

== Species ==
- Munychryia senicula Walker, 1865
- Munychryia periclyta Common & McFarland, 1970
