= Anthela pudica =

Scientific classification
- Kingdom: Animalia
- Phylum: Arthropoda
- Class: Insecta
- Order: Lepidoptera
- Family: Anthelidae
- Genus: Anthela
- Species: A. pudica

Binomial name
- Anthela pudica (C. Swinhoe, 1902)

Synonyms
- Darala pudica C. Swinhoe, 1902

Species of moth

Anthela pudica is a moth of the family Anthelidae first described by Charles Swinhoe in 1902. It is found in Australia.
