= Anthela phaeodesma =

Scientific classification
- Kingdom: Animalia
- Phylum: Arthropoda
- Class: Insecta
- Order: Lepidoptera
- Family: Anthelidae
- Genus: Anthela
- Species: A. phaeodesma

Binomial name
- Anthela phaeodesma Turner, 1921

Synonyms
- Anthela intermedia Hulstaert, 1924; Anthela phaedesma Bryk, 1934

Species of moth

Anthela phaeodesma is a moth of the Anthelidae family. It is found in Australia.
