= Anthela addita =

Scientific classification
- Kingdom: Animalia
- Phylum: Arthropoda
- Class: Insecta
- Order: Lepidoptera
- Family: Anthelidae
- Genus: Anthela
- Species: A. addita

Binomial name
- Anthela addita (Walker, 1865)

Synonyms
- Darala addita Walker, 1865; Arnissa simplex Walker, 1869; Colussa vinosa Rosenstock, R., 1885; Colussa venosa Kirby, W.F., 1892; Anthela pyrrhica Turner, A.J., 1921

Species of moth

Anthela addita is a moth of the family Anthelidae. It is found in Australia.
