= Anthela xantharcha =

Scientific classification
- Kingdom: Animalia
- Phylum: Arthropoda
- Class: Insecta
- Order: Lepidoptera
- Family: Anthelidae
- Genus: Anthela
- Species: A. xantharcha

Binomial name
- Anthela xantharcha (Meyrick, 1891)

Synonyms
- Darala xantharcha Meyrick, 1891

Species of moth

Anthela xantharcha is a moth of the Anthelidae family. It is found in Australia.
