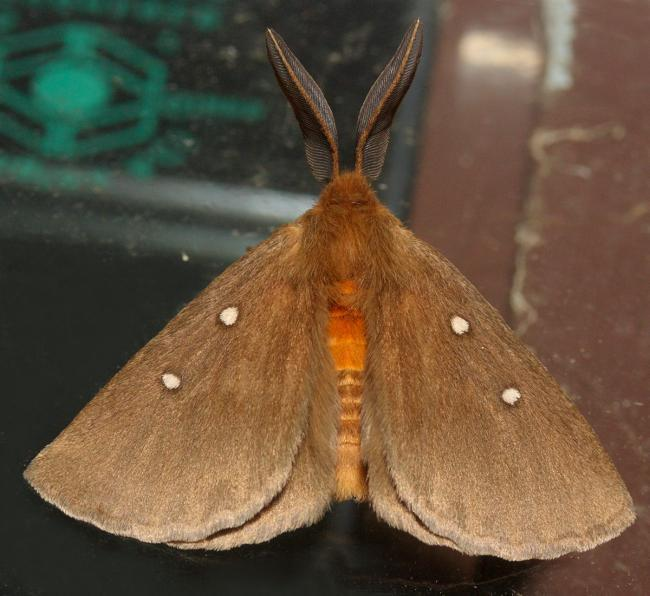

Scientific classification
- Kingdom: Animalia
- Phylum: Arthropoda
- Class: Insecta
- Order: Lepidoptera
- Family: Anthelidae
- Genus: Anthela
- Species: A. callispila

Binomial name
- Anthela callispila Lower, 1905

= Anthela callispila =

Species of moth

Anthela callispila is a species of moth of the Anthelidae family. It is found in South Australia, New South Wales and Queensland.
