= Anthela asciscens =

Scientific classification
- Kingdom: Animalia
- Phylum: Arthropoda
- Class: Insecta
- Order: Lepidoptera
- Family: Anthelidae
- Genus: Anthela
- Species: A. asciscens

Binomial name
- Anthela asciscens (T.P. Lucas, 1891)

Synonyms
- Darala asciscens Lucas, 1891; Anthela tritonea Swinhoe, 1903

Species of moth

Anthela asciscens is a moth of the Anthelidae family. It is found in Australia.
