= Anthela virescens =

Scientific classification
- Kingdom: Animalia
- Phylum: Arthropoda
- Class: Insecta
- Order: Lepidoptera
- Family: Anthelidae
- Genus: Anthela
- Species: A. virescens

Binomial name
- Anthela virescens Turner, 1939

Species of moth

Anthela virescens is a moth of the Anthelidae family. It is found in Australia.
