= Anthela ochroptera =

Scientific classification
- Kingdom: Animalia
- Phylum: Arthropoda
- Class: Insecta
- Order: Lepidoptera
- Family: Anthelidae
- Genus: Anthela
- Species: A. ochroptera

Binomial name
- Anthela ochroptera (Lower, 1892)

Synonyms
- Darala ochroptera Lower, 1892; Colussa psammochroa Lower, 1908

Species of moth

Anthela ochroptera is a moth of the family Anthelidae. It is found in Australia.
