= Anthela canescens =

Scientific classification
- Kingdom: Animalia
- Phylum: Arthropoda
- Clade: Pancrustacea
- Class: Insecta
- Order: Lepidoptera
- Family: Anthelidae
- Genus: Anthela
- Species: A. canescens

Binomial name
- Anthela canescens (Walker, 1855)

Synonyms
- Darala canescens Walker, 1855; Colussa latifera Walker, 1862; Colussa uvaria Walker, 1866; Opsirhina tintinarra Tepper, 1890; Darala scortea Lucas, 1891; Darala succinea Lucas, 1891; Darala succinia Walker, 1866; Anthela moretonensis Strand, 1925

Species of moth

Anthela canescens is a moth of the family Anthelidae. It is found in Australia.
