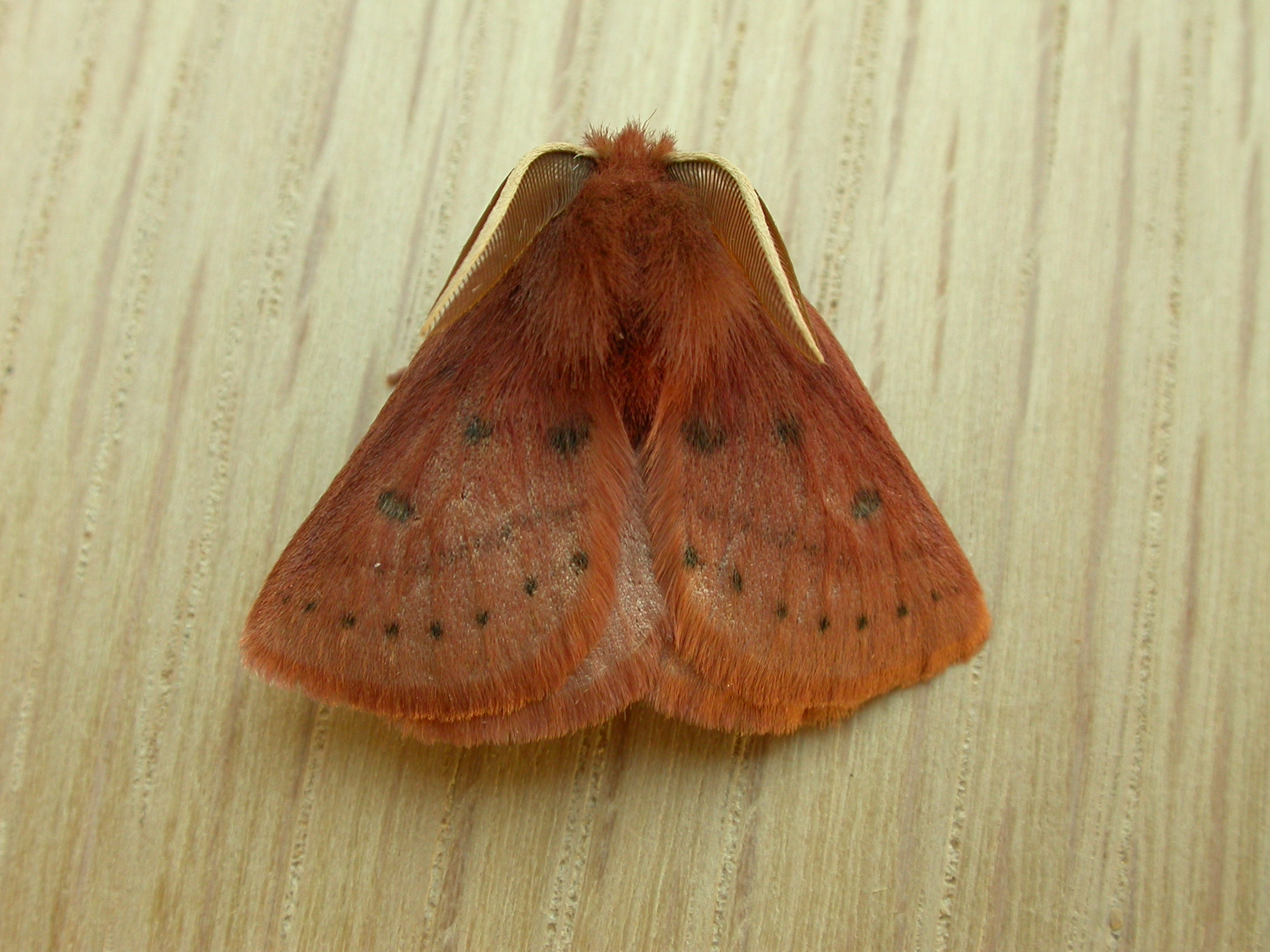

Scientific classification
- Kingdom: Animalia
- Phylum: Arthropoda
- Class: Insecta
- Order: Lepidoptera
- Family: Anthelidae
- Genus: Anthela
- Species: A. ferruginosa

Binomial name
- Anthela ferruginosa Walker, 1855

Synonyms
- Darala parva Walker, 1855; Darala minuta Swinhoe, 1892; Anthela minutata Swinhoe, 1892; Anthela walkeri Strand, 1925; Anthela guttifascia Strand, 1925

= Anthela ferruginosa =

Species of moth

Anthela ferruginosa is a species of moth of the family Anthelidae. It is found in Australia.

The wingspan is about 40 mm.

The larvae feed on various Australian Poaceae species.
