= Pterolocera =

Scientific classification
- Domain: Eukaryota
- Kingdom: Animalia
- Phylum: Arthropoda
- Class: Insecta
- Order: Lepidoptera
- Family: Anthelidae
- Genus: Pterolocera; Walker, 1855

Genus of moths

Pterolocera is a genus of moths of the Anthelidae family. The genus was erected by Francis Walker in 1855.

== Species ==
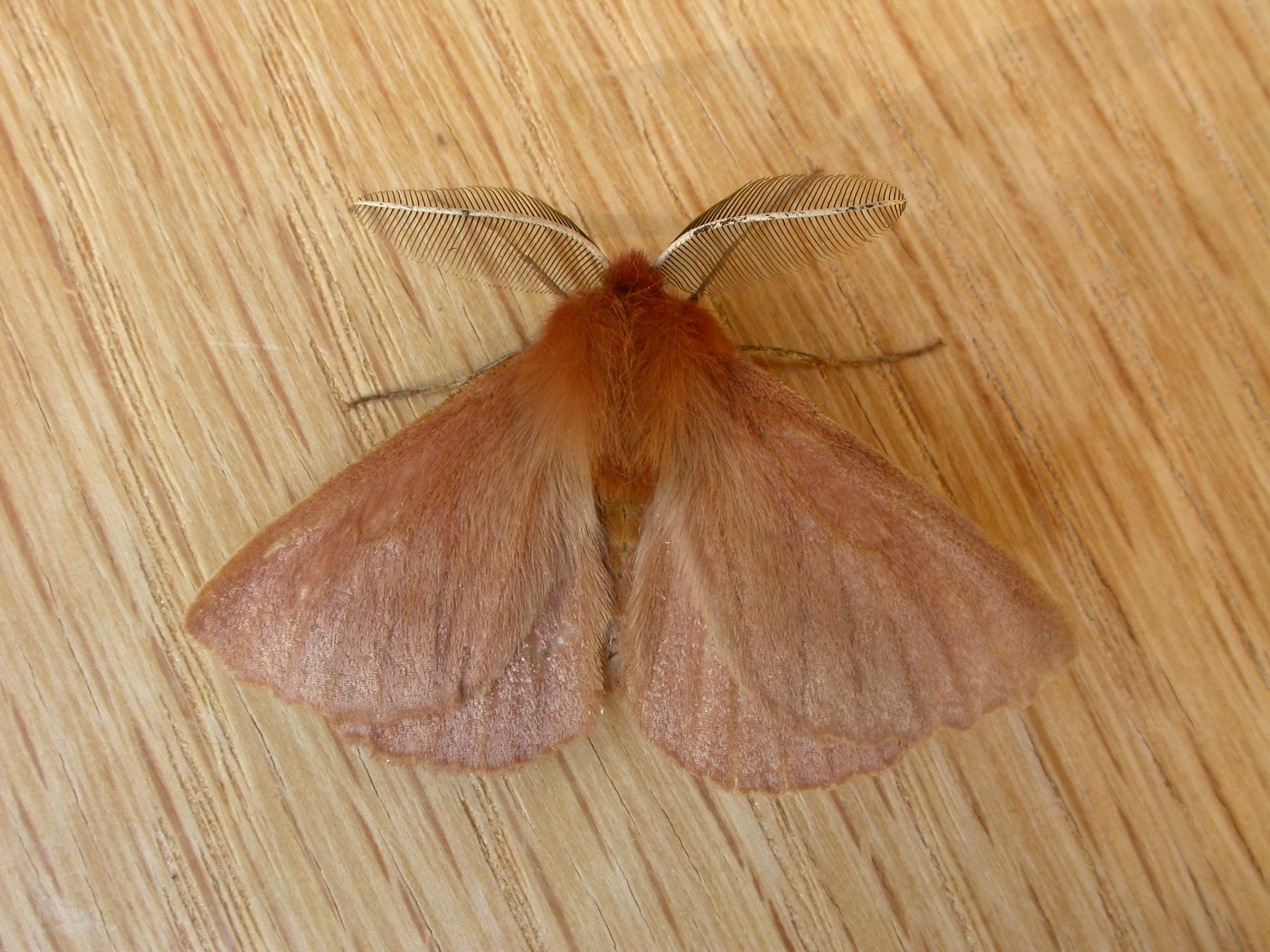
Pterolocera leucocera

- Pterolocera amplicornis Walker, 1855
- Pterolocera elizabetha (White, 1841)
- Pterolocera ferruginea Strand, [1926]
- Pterolocera ferrugineofusca Strand, [1926]
- Pterolocera insignis Herrich-Schäffer, [1856]
- Pterolocera isogama Turner, 1931
- Pterolocera leucocera (Turner, 1921)
- Pterolocera rubescens (Walker, 1865)
