= Anthela neurospasta =

Scientific classification
- Kingdom: Animalia
- Phylum: Arthropoda
- Class: Insecta
- Order: Lepidoptera
- Family: Anthelidae
- Genus: Anthela
- Species: A. neurospasta

Binomial name
- Anthela neurospasta Turner, 1902

Synonyms
- Anthela neurospasta Turner, 1902; Anthela ochroneura Turner, 1915; Anthela linopepla Turner, 1921

Species of moth

Anthela neurospasta is a moth of the Anthelidae family. It is found in Australia.
