= Corticomis =

Scientific classification
- Domain: Eukaryota
- Kingdom: Animalia
- Phylum: Arthropoda
- Class: Insecta
- Order: Lepidoptera
- Family: Anthelidae
- Genus: Corticomis; Van Eecke, 1924

Genus of moths

Corticomis is a genus of moths of the family Anthelidae first described by Van Eecke in 1924.

== Species ==
- Corticomis eupterotioides Van Eecke, 1924
- Corticomis marmorea Van Eecke, 1924
