= Pterolocera rubescens =

Scientific classification
- Kingdom: Animalia
- Phylum: Arthropoda
- Class: Insecta
- Order: Lepidoptera
- Family: Anthelidae
- Genus: Pterolocera
- Species: P. rubescens

Binomial name
- Pterolocera rubescens (Walker, 1865)

Synonyms
- Darala rubescens Walker, 1865; Anthela elizabethae Turner, 1921

Species of moth

Pterolocera rubescens is a moth of the Anthelidae family. It is found in Australia.
