= Comana miltogramma =

Scientific classification
- Kingdom: Animalia
- Phylum: Arthropoda
- Clade: Pancrustacea
- Class: Insecta
- Order: Lepidoptera
- Family: Limacodidae
- Genus: Comana
- Species: C. miltogramma

Binomial name
- Comana miltogramma (Meyrick, 1891)

Synonyms
- Momopola miltogramma Meyrick, 1891; Darala rosea Lucas, 1891; Hildala miniacea Swinhoe, 1892

Species of moth

Comana miltogramma is a moth of the family Limacodidae. It is found in Australia.
