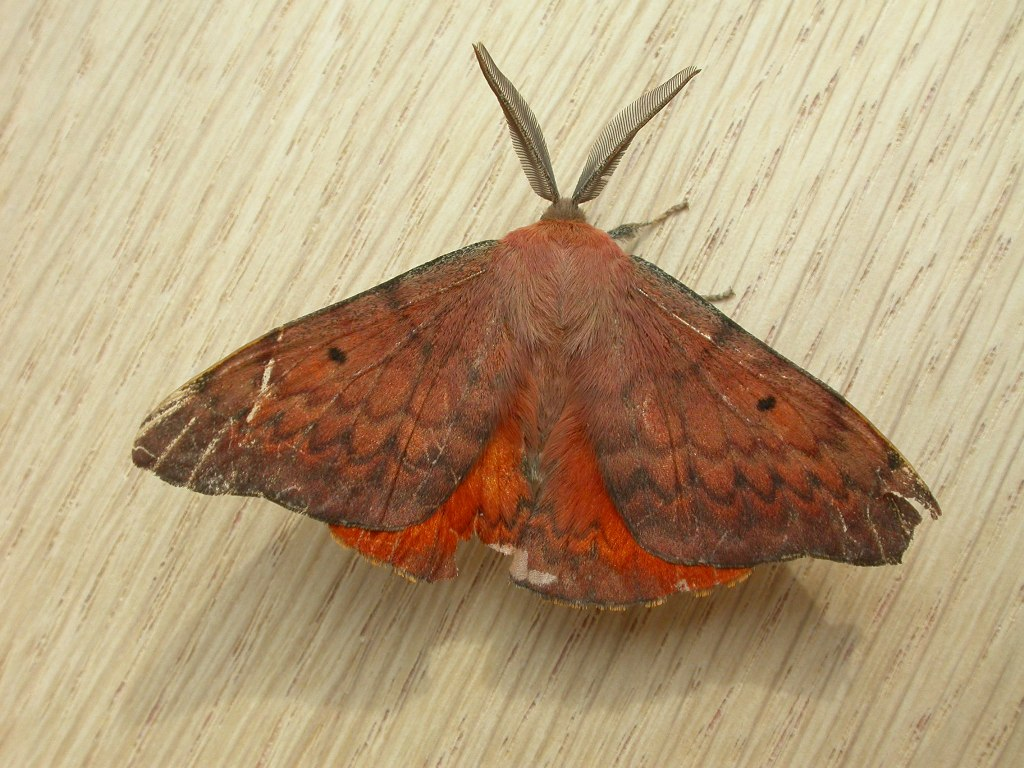

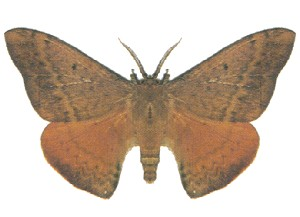

Scientific classification
- Kingdom: Animalia
- Phylum: Arthropoda
- Class: Insecta
- Order: Lepidoptera
- Family: Anthelidae
- Genus: Chenuala; C. Swinhoe, 1892
- Species: C. heliaspis

Binomial name
- Chenuala heliaspis (Meyrick, 1891)

Synonyms
- Ocneria heliaspis Meyrick, 1891; Chenuala rufa C. Swinhoe, 1892; Chelepteryx expolitus Scott, 1893; Anthela epicrypha C. Swinhoe, 1905

= Chenuala =

Genus of moths

Chenuala is a monotypic moth genus in the family Anthelidae described by Charles Swinhoe in 1892. Its only species, Chenuala heliaspis, the rose anthelid, was described by Edward Meyrick in 1891. It is endemic to Australia.

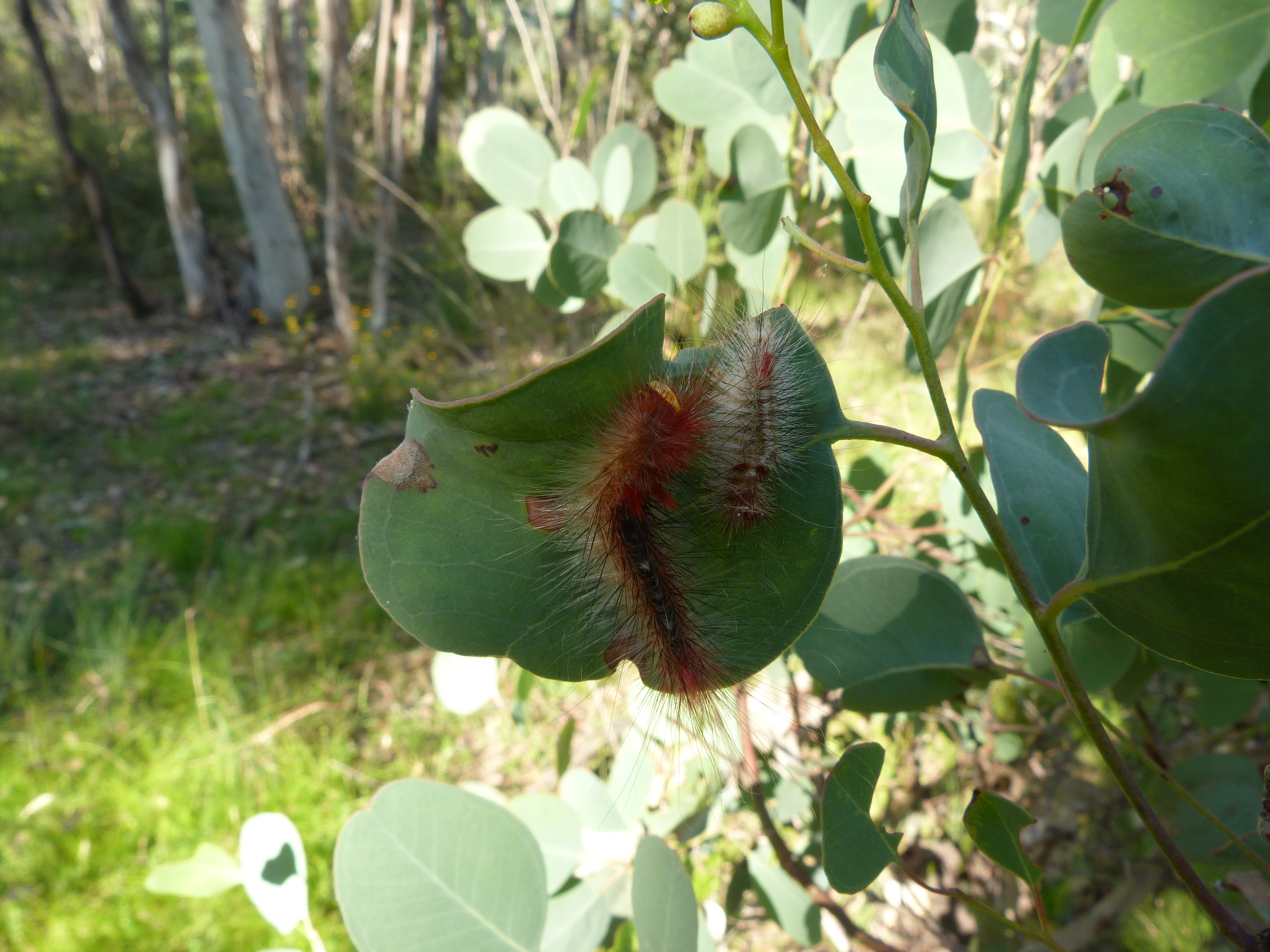
Larva

The wingspan is approximately 6 cm for males and 7 cm for females.

The larvae feed on the leaves of Eucalyptus, Acacia and Pinus species.
