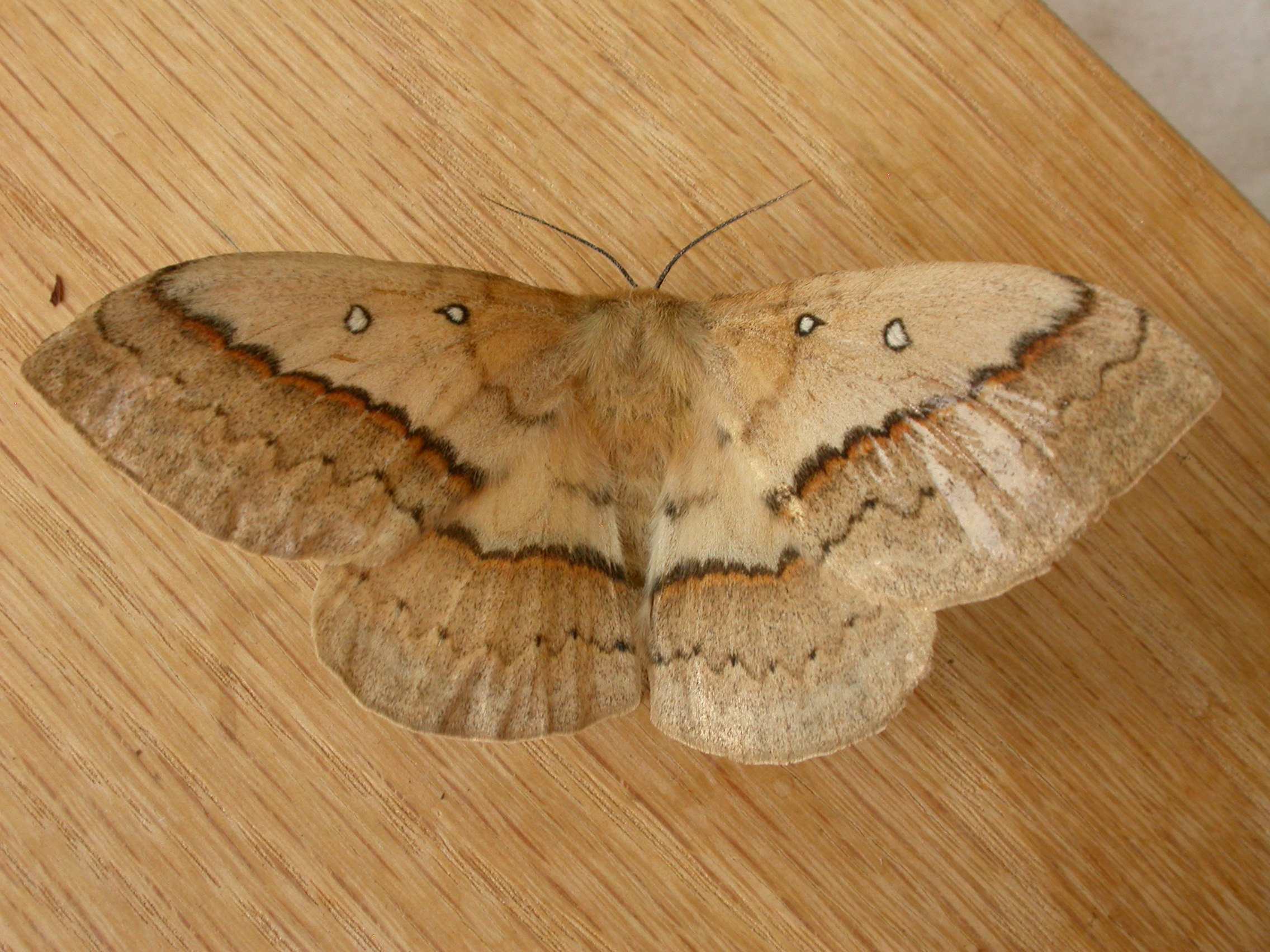
- Female
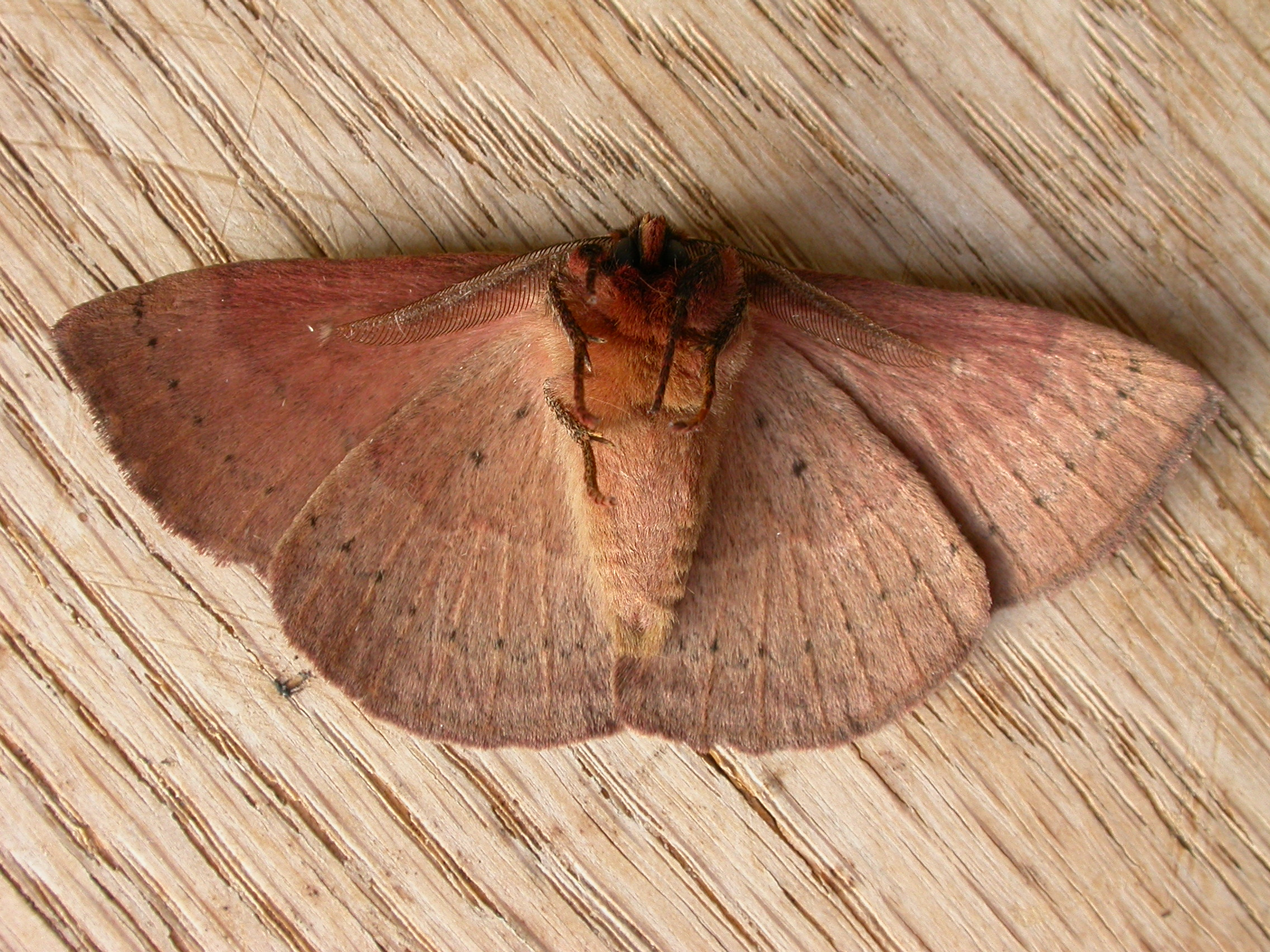
- Male

Scientific classification
- Kingdom: Animalia
- Phylum: Arthropoda
- Class: Insecta
- Order: Lepidoptera
- Family: Anthelidae
- Genus: Anthela
- Species: A. nicothoe

Binomial name
- Anthela nicothoe (Boisduval, 1832)

Synonyms
- Bombyx nicothoe Boisduval, 1832; Darala adusta Walker, 1855; Darala eucalypti Herrich-Schäffer, 1858; Darala censors Walker, 1865; Darala consors Walker, 1866; Laelia australasiae Herrich-Schäffer, 1855

= Anthela nicothoe =

Species of moth

Anthela nicothoe, the urticating anthelid, is a moth of the family Anthelidae.

== History ==
The species was first described by Jean Baptiste Boisduval in 1832. It is found in Australia, including Tasmania.

== Appearance ==
The adult moth's wingspan is about 70 mm for males and 100 mm for females.

The large brown caterpillar has a puffy brown segmented body with urticating hairs on each rise with none between. These hairs are both long and short, with the longer ones being white and the shorter ones being brown giving the caterpillar a tufted look, especially visible when curled in the defense posture of a spiral. The hairs are very fine and brittle, easily penetrating the skin and breaking off.

Female caterpillars grow to about 8 cm long, but the male's length is only about 5 cm.

The caterpillar pupates in a brown cocoon, first having poked its hairs through the cocoon wall before pupating inside, giving the cocoon a furry appearance. These hairs are just as thin and brittle as when they were on the caterpillar.

== Lifecycle ==
The larvae feed on various Acacia species, especially Acacia baileyana and Acacia dealbata. (Personal observation of this taxon, in all life stages, suggested that-in central coastal parts of South Australia, where its larvae and cocoons were observed only on and in large sprawling shrubs of Acacia longifolia subspecies sophorae, growing naturally in stable depressions and more densely vegetated swales in silica sand dunes ).

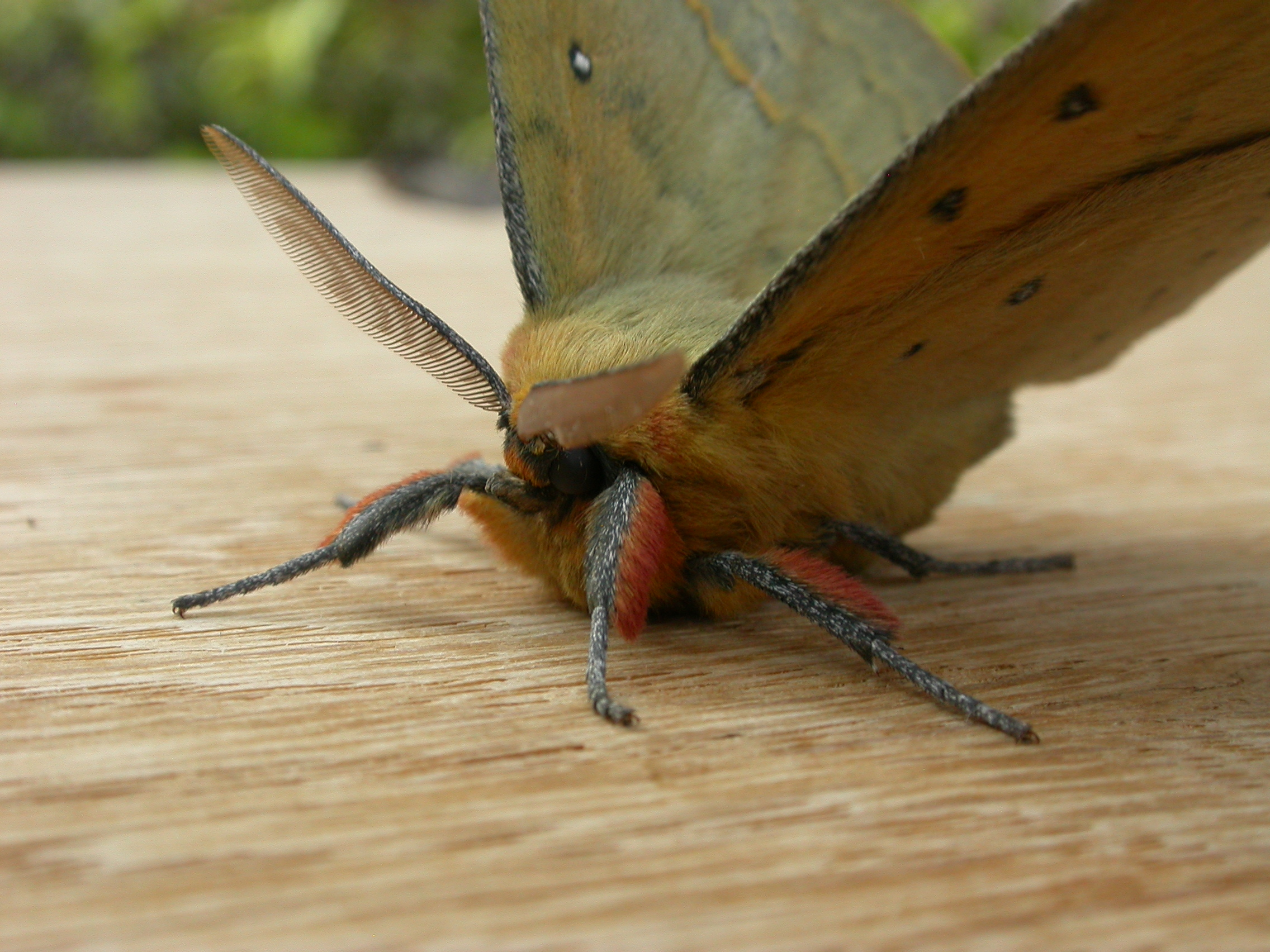

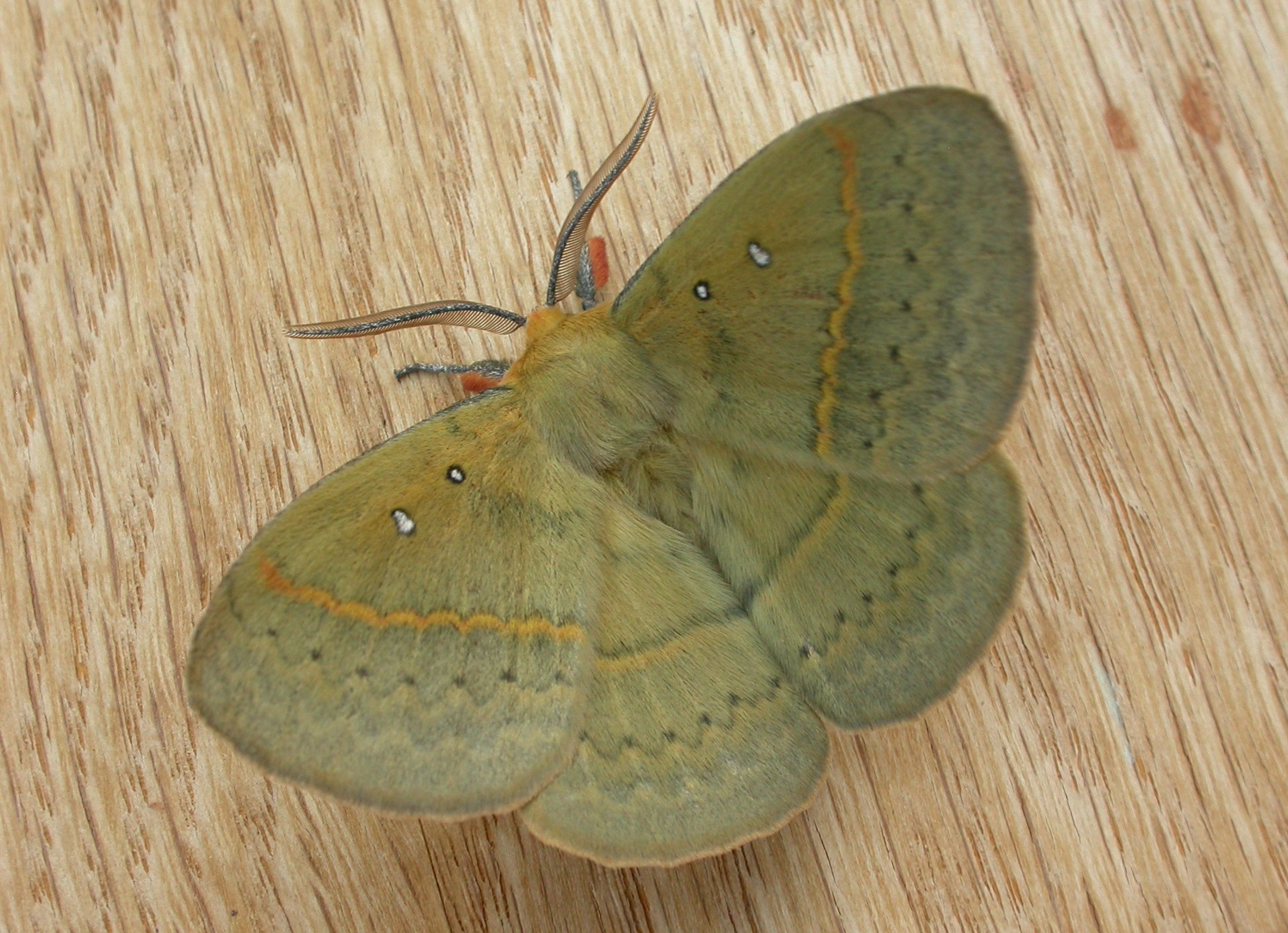

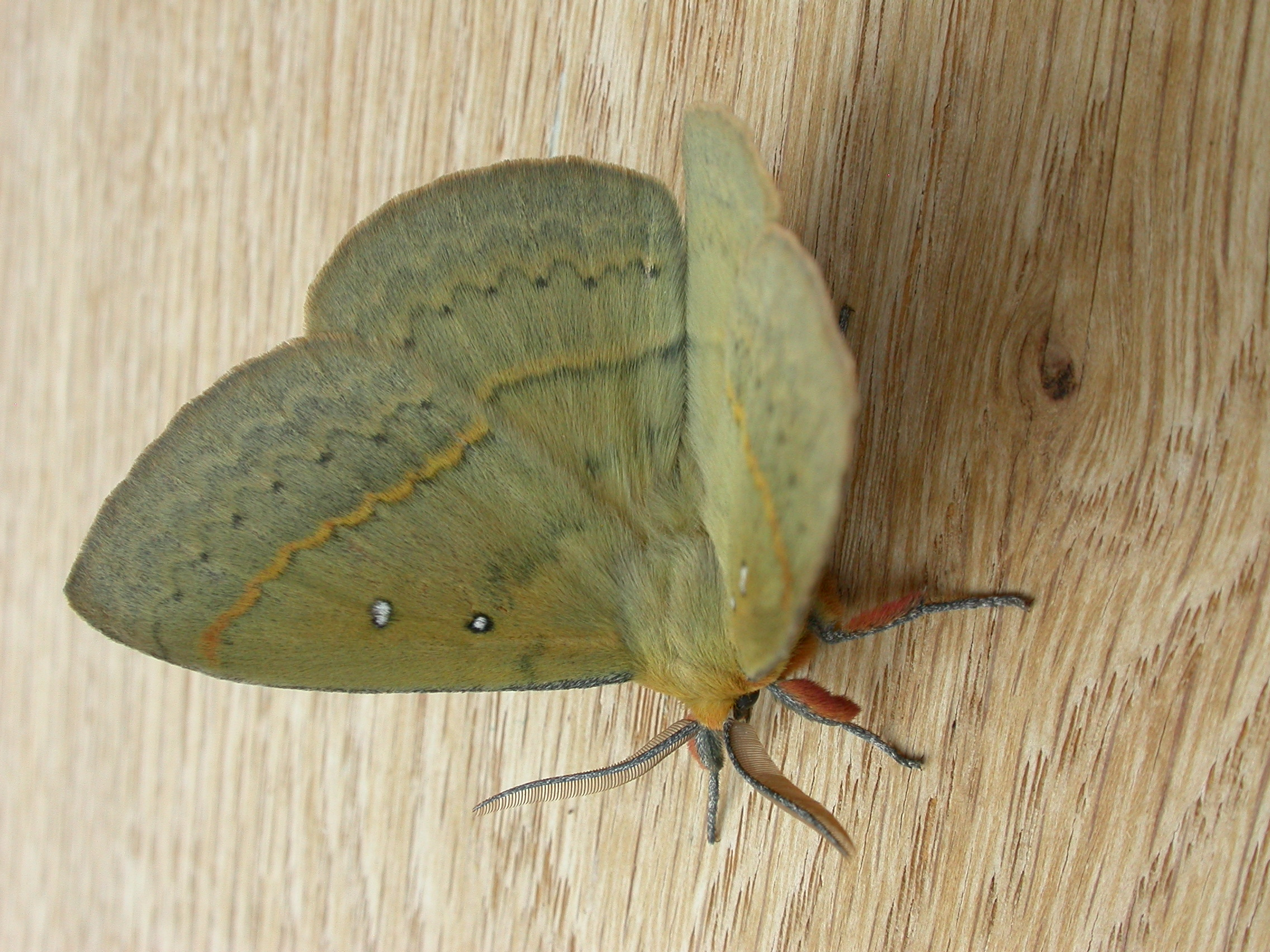
