= Omphaliodes =

Scientific classification
- Kingdom: Animalia
- Phylum: Arthropoda
- Clade: Pancrustacea
- Class: Insecta
- Order: Lepidoptera
- Family: Anthelidae
- Genus: Omphaliodes; Felder, 1874
- Species: O. obscura

Binomial name
- Omphaliodes obscura (Walker, 1856)

Synonyms
- Genus: Aprosita Turner, 1914; Species: Trichiura obscura Walker, 1855; Omphaliodes nana Felder, 1874; Omphaliodes nuna; Aprosita ulothrix Turner, 1914

Genus of moths

Omphaliodes is a monotypic moth genus in the family Anthelidae described by Felder in 1874. Its only species, Omphaliodes obscura, described by Francis Walker in 1856, is found in Australia.
