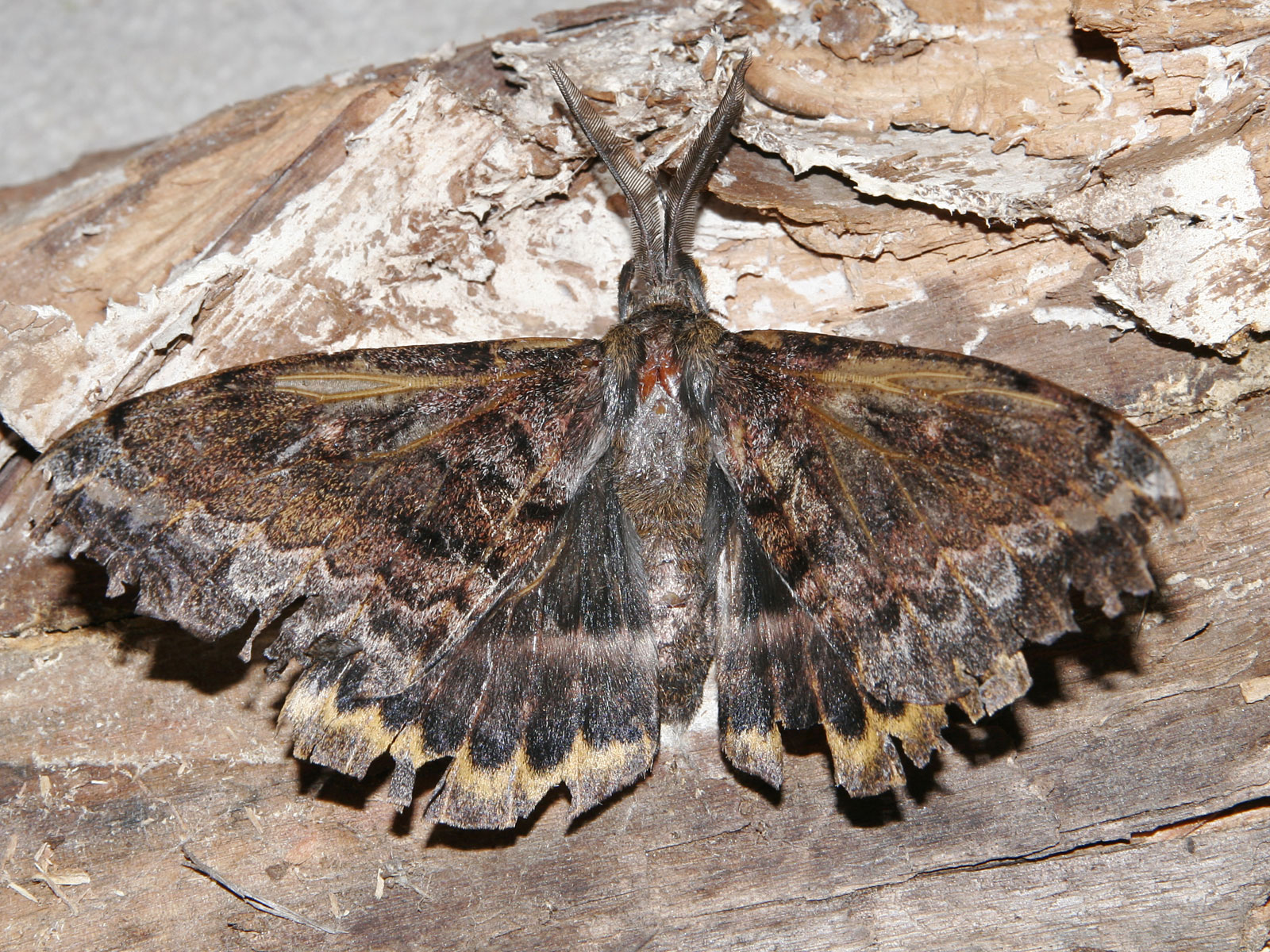
- Chelepteryx collesi

Scientific classification
- Kingdom: Animalia
- Phylum: Arthropoda
- Class: Insecta
- Order: Lepidoptera
- Superfamily: Bombycoidea
- Family: Anthelidae; Turner 1904

= Anthelidae =

Family of moths

Anthelidae is a family of Australian lappet moths in the order Lepidoptera. It had earlier been considered to be part of the Lasiocampoidea superfamily, but a 2008 molecular phylogenetic study, supported by a 2011 study, resulted in reincluding the Anthelidae in the superfamily Bombycoidea.

== Diversity ==
The subfamily Anthelinae consists of a total of nine genera and ninety-four species. Of these, seven genera and about ninety-one species, while the subfamily Munychryiinae comprises two genera and three species:

- Subfamily Anthelinae:
  - Anthela
  - Chelepteryx
  - Chenuala
  - Corticomis
  - Nataxa
  - Omphaliodes
  - Pterolocera
- Subfamily Munychryiinae:
  - Munychryia
  - Gephyroneura
