= List of Lasiocampidae genera =

The moth family Lasiocampidae contains the following genera:

- Acnocampa
- Acosmetoptera
- Alenella
- Alompra
- Amurilla
- Anadiasa
- Anastrolos
- Anchirithra
- Andraphisia
- Apatelopteryx
- Apotolype
- Aproscepta
- Archaeopacha
- Argonestis
- Arguda
- Artace
- Aselgia
- Aspiducha
- Aurivillia
- Autosphyla
- Baodera
- Batatara
- Baubota
- Beralade
- Bharetta
- Bhima
- Bombycomorpha
- Bombycopsis
- Borocera
- Braura
- Caeculia
- Callopizoma
- Caloecia
- Caphara
- Catalebeda
- Cerberolebeda
- Chatra
- Chilena
- Chionodiptera
- Chionopsyche
- Chondrostega
- Chondrostegoides
- Chonopla
- Chrysium
- Chrysopsyche
- Claphe
- Clathe
- Closterothrix
- Concaedes
- Cosmeptera
- Cosmotriche
- Craspia
- Crexa
- Crinocraspeda
- Cyclophragma
- Cymatopacha
- Dasychirinula
- Dasysoma
- Dendrolimus
- Diapalpus
- Diaphormorpha
- Dichromosoma
- Dicogaster
- Digglesia
- Dinometa
- Dipluriella
- Dollmania
- Echedorus
- Edwardsimemna
- Endacantha
- Entometa
- Epicnaptera
- Epicnapteroides
- Epitrabala
- Eremaea
- Eremanepsia
- Ergolea
- Eriogaster
- Eriomorpha
- Estigena
- Eteinopla
- Eucraera
- Euglyphis
- Eupagopteryx
- Europtera
- Eustaudingeria
- Eutachyptera
- Euthrix
- Eutricha
- Euwallengrenia
- Gastromega
- Gastropacha
- Gastroplakaeis
- Genduara
- Glocia
- Gloveria
- Gonobombyx
- Gonometa
- Gonopacha
- Gonotrichidia
- Gorgonella
- Grammodora
- Hallicarnia
- Haplopacha
- Henometa
- Heteropacha
- Hoenimnema
- Hypopacha
- Hypotrabala
- Isais
- Isostigena
- Karenkonia
- Kononia
- Kosala
- Kunugia
- Labea
- Labedera
- Laeliopsis
- Lajonquierea
- Lambessa
- Lamprantaugia
- Lasiocampa
- Lebeda
- Lechriolepis
- Leipoxais
- Lenodora
- Leptometa
- Lerodes
- Libanopacha
- Libyopacha
- Limacodilla
- Listoca
- Macrocampa
- Macromphalia
- Macrothylacia
- Malacosoma
- Malacostola
- Mallocampa
- Melopla
- Mesera
- Mesocelis
- Metadula
- Metajana
- Metanastria
- Micropacha
- Mimopacha
- Nadiasa
- Napta
- Neoborocera
- Nesara
- Neurochyta
- Norapidia
- Notogroma
- Ocha
- Ochanella
- Ochrochroma
- Ocinaropsis
- Odonestis
- Odontocheilopteryx
- Odontocraspis
- Odontogama
- Odontopacha
- Oeona
- Opisthodontia
- Oplometa
- Opsirhina
- Pachygastria
- Pachymeta
- Pachymetana
- Pachymetoides
- Pachyna
- Pachypasa
- Pachypasoides
- Paradoxopla
- Paralebeda
- Pararguda
- Pehria
- Pernattia
- Phaedria
- Philotherma
- Phoberopsis
- Phoenicladocera
- Phyllodesma
- Pinara
- Planosa
- Poecilocampa
- Pompeja
- Porela
- Prodonestis
- Prorifrons
- Pseudarguda
- Pseudoborocera
- Pseudolyra
- Pseudometa
- Pseudophyllodes
- Psilogaster
- Ptyssophlebia
- Pyrosis
- Quadrina
- Radhica
- Raphipeza
- Rhathymodes
- Rhinobombyx
- Rhinogyne
- Rhynchobombyx
- Routledgia
- Schausinna
- Seitzia
- Selenephera
- Selenepherides
- Sena
- Sinaga
- Sitina
- Somadasys
- Sorema
- Sphinta
- Sporostigena
- Stenophatna
- Stenophylloides
- Stoermeriana
- Streblote
- Strumella
- Suana
- Symphyta
- Syrastrena
- Syrastrenoides
- Syrastrenopsis
- Tacillia
- Takanea
- Tauscheria
- Ticera
- Titya
- Tolype
- Tolytia
- Trabala
- Trabaloides
- Trichiura
- Trichiurana
- Trichodia
- Trichopisthia
- Tytocha
- Voracia
