= Macromphaliinae =

Scientific classification
- Kingdom: Animalia
- Phylum: Arthropoda
- Clade: Pancrustacea
- Class: Insecta
- Order: Lepidoptera
- Family: Lasiocampidae
- Subfamily: Macromphaliinae; Franclemont, 1973

Subfamily of moths

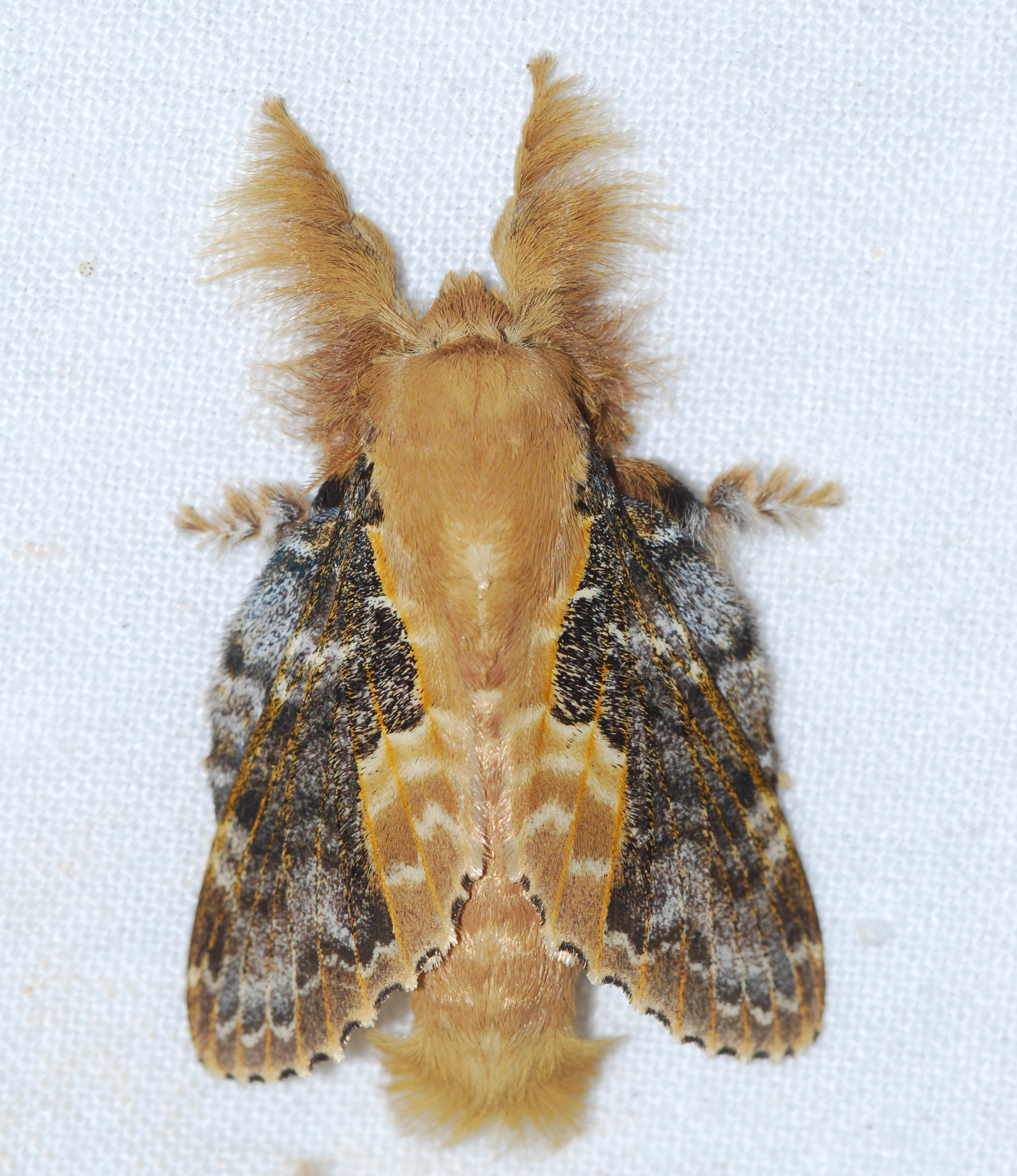
Lasiocampid Moth (Euglyphis claudia folia) photographed in Roura, French Guiana

Macromphaliinae is a subfamily of the moth family Lasiocampidae. The subfamily was first described by John G. Franclemont in 1973.

== Genera ==
- Apotolype Franclemont, 1973
- Artace Walker, 1855
- Hypopacha Neumoegen & Dyar, 1893
- Macromphalia C. & R. Felder, 1874
- Mesera Walker, 1855
- Titya Walker, 1855
- Tolype Hübner, [1820]
- Tytocha Schaus, 1924
