= Phaedria =

Scientific classification
- Kingdom: Animalia
- Phylum: Arthropoda
- Class: Insecta
- Order: Lepidoptera
- Family: Lasiocampidae
- Genus: Phaedria; Walker, 1855

Genus of moths

Phaedria is a monotypic moth genus in the family Lasiocampidae described by Francis Walker in 1855. Its one species, Phaedria moderata, was described by the same author in the same year. It is found in Brazil.

Lepidoptera and Some Other Life Forms gives this genus and species as synonyms of Labedera and L. moderata.
