= Ocha =

Scientific classification
- Kingdom: Animalia
- Phylum: Arthropoda
- Class: Insecta
- Order: Lepidoptera
- Family: Lasiocampidae
- Genus: Ocha (Walker, 1855)

Genus of moths

Ocha is a genus of moths in the family Lasiocampidae. The Global Lepidoptera Names Index described it as a synonym of Nesara.
