= Edwardsimemna =

Scientific classification
- Kingdom: Animalia
- Phylum: Arthropoda
- Class: Insecta
- Order: Lepidoptera
- Family: Lasiocampidae
- Genus: Edwardsimemna; Neumoegen & Dyar, 1894
- Species: E. jalapae

Binomial name
- Edwardsimemna jalapae H. Edwards, 1884

Genus of moths

Edwardsimemna is a monotypic moth genus in the family Lasiocampidae erected by Berthold Neumoegen and Harrison Gray Dyar Jr. in 1894. Its single species, Edwardsimemna jalapae, described by Henry Edwards in 1884, is found in Mexico.
