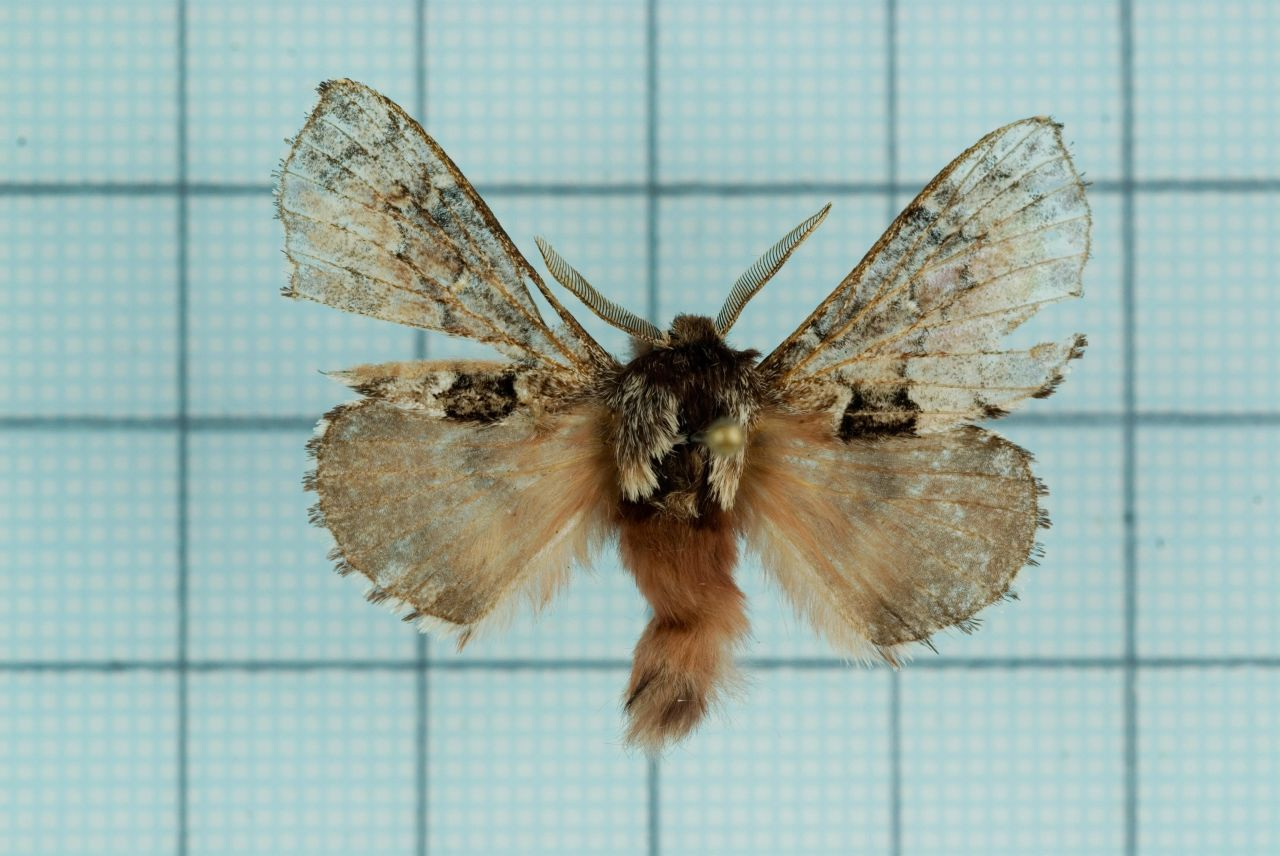
- Cosmotriche discitincta discitincta

Scientific classification
- Domain: Eukaryota
- Kingdom: Animalia
- Phylum: Arthropoda
- Class: Insecta
- Order: Lepidoptera
- Family: Lasiocampidae
- Genus: Cosmotriche
- Species: C. discitincta

Binomial name
- Cosmotriche discitincta Wileman, 1914

= Cosmotriche discitincta =

Species of moth

Cosmotriche discitincta is a moth of the family Lasiocampidae first described by Alfred Ernest Wileman in 1914. It is found in Nepal and Taiwan.

== Subspecies ==
- Cosmotriche discitincta discitincta (Taiwan)
- Cosmotriche discitincta szini Zolotuhin, 2001 (Nepal)
