= Diaphormorpha =

Scientific classification
- Kingdom: Animalia
- Phylum: Arthropoda
- Class: Insecta
- Order: Lepidoptera
- Family: Lasiocampidae
- Genus: Diaphormorpha de Lajonquière, 1972

Genus of moths

Diaphormorpha is a genus of moths in the family Lasiocampidae. The genus was described by Yves de Lajonquière in 1972.
