= Pseudoborocera =

Scientific classification
- Kingdom: Animalia
- Phylum: Arthropoda
- Class: Insecta
- Order: Lepidoptera
- Family: Lasiocampidae
- Genus: Pseudoborocera de Lajonquière, 1972
- Species: P. legrasi

Binomial name
- Pseudoborocera legrasi de Lajonquière, 1972

Genus of moths

Pseudoborocera is a monotypic moth genus in the family Lasiocampidae erected by Yves de Lajonquière in 1972. Its single species, Pseudoborocera legrasi, described by the same author in the same year, is found in Madagascar.
