= Pseudolyra =

Scientific classification
- Kingdom: Animalia
- Phylum: Arthropoda
- Class: Insecta
- Order: Lepidoptera
- Family: Lasiocampidae
- Genus: Pseudolyra; Aurivillius, 1925

Genus of moths

Pseudolyra is a genus of moths in the family Lasiocampidae. The genus was erected by Per Olof Christopher Aurivillius in 1925.

== Species ==
- Pseudolyra bubalitica Tams, 1929
- Pseudolyra caiala Tams, 1936
- Pseudolyra cervina Aurivillius, 1905
- Pseudolyra cinerea Aurivillius, 1901
- Pseudolyra despecta Le Cerf, 1922
- Pseudolyra distincta Distnat, 1899
- Pseudolyra divisa Aurivillius, 1925
- Pseudolyra lineadentata Bethune-Baker, 1911
- Pseudolyra major Hering, 1941
- Pseudolyra megista Tams, 1931
- Pseudolyra minima Hering, 1932
- Pseudolyra miona Tams, 1936
- Pseudolyra parva Tams, 1931
