= Isostigena =

Scientific classification
- Kingdom: Animalia
- Phylum: Arthropoda
- Class: Insecta
- Order: Lepidoptera
- Family: Lasiocampidae
- Genus: Isostigena; Bethune-Baker, 1904

Genus of moths

Isostigena is a monotypic moth genus in the family Lasiocampidae erected by George Thomas Bethune-Baker in 1904. Its single species, Isostigena bicellata, described by the same author in the same year, was found in what is now Papua New Guinea.
