= Ochrochroma =

Scientific classification
- Kingdom: Animalia
- Phylum: Arthropoda
- Class: Insecta
- Order: Lepidoptera
- Family: Lasiocampidae
- Genus: Ochrochroma de Lajonquière, 1970

Genus of moths

Ochrochroma is a genus of moths in the family Lasiocampidae. The genus was erected by Yves de Lajonquière in 1970.

== Species ==
- Ochrochroma cadoreli de Lajonquière, 1969
- Ochrochroma nepos de Lajonquière, 1969
- Ochrochroma opulenta de Lajonquière, 1969
- Ochrochroma seyrigi de Lajonquière, 1969
- Ochrochroma simplex Aurivillius, 1908
