= Chonopla =

Scientific classification
- Kingdom: Animalia
- Phylum: Arthropoda
- Class: Insecta
- Order: Lepidoptera
- Family: Lasiocampidae
- Genus: Chonopla de Lajonquiere, 1980

Genus of moths

Chonopla is a genus of moths in the family Lasiocampidae. The genus was erected by Yves de Lajonquière in 1980.

== Species ==
- Chonopla modulata Swinhoe, 1890
- Chonopla tecta de Lajonquière, 1979
