= Braura =

Scientific classification
- Kingdom: Animalia
- Phylum: Arthropoda
- Class: Insecta
- Order: Lepidoptera
- Family: Lasiocampidae
- Genus: Braura; Walker, 1865

Genus of moths

Braura is a genus of moths in the family Lasiocampidae first described by Francis Walker in 1865.
