= Oplometa =

Scientific classification
- Kingdom: Animalia
- Phylum: Arthropoda
- Class: Insecta
- Order: Lepidoptera
- Family: Lasiocampidae
- Genus: Oplometa; Aurivillius, 1894

Genus of moths

Oplometa is a genus of moths in the family Lasiocampidae. The genus was erected by Per Olof Christopher Aurivillius in 1894.

== Species ==
- Oplometa cassandra (Druce, 1887)
- Oplometa cornuta Aurivillius, 1894
