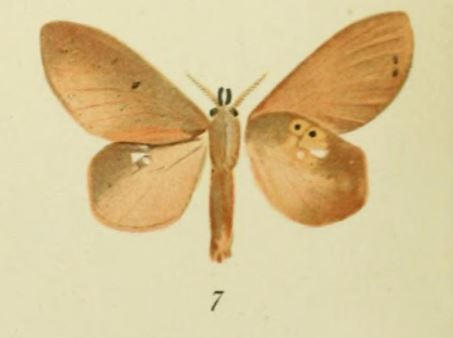
- Estigena africana

Scientific classification
- Kingdom: Animalia
- Phylum: Arthropoda
- Clade: Pancrustacea
- Class: Insecta
- Order: Lepidoptera
- Family: Lasiocampidae
- Genus: Estigena; Moore, 1860

Synonyms
- Tauscheria Bryk, 1915

= Estigena =

Genus of moths

Estigena is a genus of moths in the family Lasiocampidae. It was erected by Frederic Moore in 1860. It is found throughout India, Sri Lanka, the Middle East, Myanmar and Java.

Lepidoptera and Some Other Life Forms considers this name to be a synonym of Gastropacha.

== Description ==
Palpi very long and slender, varying somewhat in length. Antennae with short branches. Legs with very minute spurs. Forewings are long and narrow, outer margin very obliquely rounded. Veins 6, 7 and 8 stalked. Stalk of veins 9 and 10 are long. Hindwings produced and oval in shape. Veins 3, 4 and 5 stalked, whereas vein 8 curved and met by a bar from vein 7. Accessory costal veinlets are numerous and prominent.

== Species ==
- Estigena africana
- Estigena caesarea
- Estigena encausta
- Estigena koniensis
- Estigena leopoldi
- Estigena minima
- Estigena pardale
- Estigena pelengata
- Estigena philippinensis
- Estigena prionophora
- Estigena silvestris
- Estigena wilemani
- Estigena xenapates
