= Ptyssophlebia =

Scientific classification
- Kingdom: Animalia
- Phylum: Arthropoda
- Clade: Pancrustacea
- Class: Insecta
- Order: Lepidoptera
- Family: Lasiocampidae
- Genus: Ptyssophlebia; Berio, 1937

Genus of moths

Ptyssophlebia is a genus of moths in the family Lasiocampidae. The genus was erected by Emilio Berio in 1937.

== Species ==
- Ptyssophlebia avis Berio, 1937
- Ptyssophlebia meridionalis Tams, 1936
