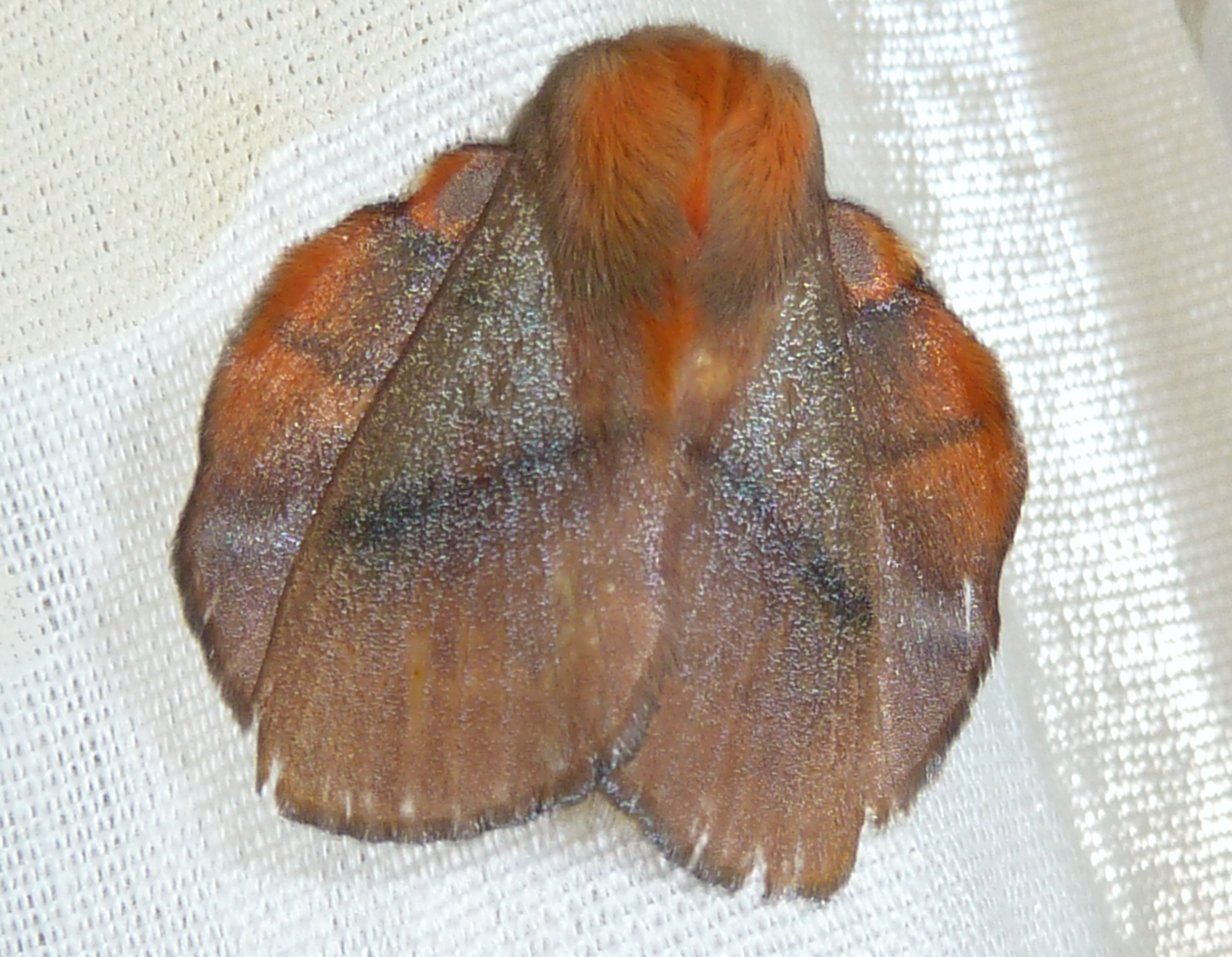

Scientific classification
- Kingdom: Animalia
- Phylum: Arthropoda
- Class: Insecta
- Order: Lepidoptera
- Family: Lasiocampidae
- Genus: Trichopisthia; Aurivillius, 1909
- Species: T. monteiroi

Binomial name
- Trichopisthia monteiroi H. H. Druce, 1887

Synonyms
- Trichopisthia pallida Fawcett, 1903

= Trichopisthia =

Genus of moths

Trichopisthia is a monotypic moth genus in the family Lasiocampidae erected by Per Olof Christopher Aurivillius in 1909. Its single species, Trichopisthia monteiroi, described by Hamilton Herbert Druce in 1887, is found in Zimbabwe, Mozambique and KwaZulu-Natal, South Africa.
