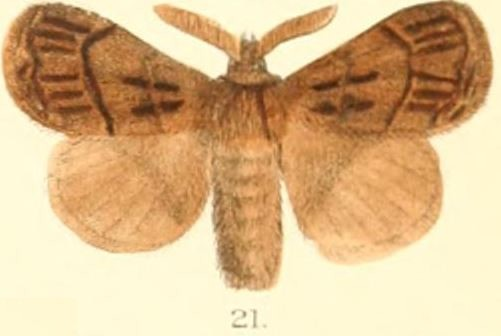

Scientific classification
- Kingdom: Animalia
- Phylum: Arthropoda
- Clade: Pancrustacea
- Class: Insecta
- Order: Lepidoptera
- Family: Lasiocampidae
- Genus: Baodera; Zolotuhin, 1992
- Species: B. khasiana

Binomial name
- Baodera khasiana (Moore, 1879)

Synonyms
- Trichiura khasiana Moore, 1879

= Baodera =

Genus of moths

Baodera is a monotypic moth genus in the family Lasiocampidae. The genus was erected by Vadim V. Zolotuhin in 1992. Its only species, Baodera khasiana, was first described by Frederic Moore in 1879 as Trichiura khasiana. It is found in India.
