= Gorgonella =

Scientific classification
- Kingdom: Animalia
- Phylum: Arthropoda
- Clade: Pancrustacea
- Class: Insecta
- Order: Lepidoptera
- Family: Lasiocampidae
- Genus: Gorgonella; Zolotuhin, 2000

Genus of moths

Gorgonella is a genus of moths in the family Lasiocampidae. The genus was erected by Vadim V. Zolotuhin in 2000.
