= Dasychirinula =

Scientific classification
- Kingdom: Animalia
- Phylum: Arthropoda
- Class: Insecta
- Order: Lepidoptera
- Family: Lasiocampidae
- Genus: Dasychirinula; Hering, 1926

Genus of moths

Dasychirinula is a monotypic moth genus in the family Lasiocampidae first described by Erich Martin Hering in 1926. Its only species, Dasychirinula chrysogramma, described in the same publication, is found in Kenya.
