= Haplopacha =

Scientific classification
- Kingdom: Animalia
- Phylum: Arthropoda
- Class: Insecta
- Order: Lepidoptera
- Family: Lasiocampidae
- Genus: Haplopacha; Aurivillius, 1905

Genus of moths

Haplopacha is a genus of moths in the family Lasiocampidae. The genus was erected by Per Olof Christopher Aurivillius in 1905.

== Species ==
- Haplopacha cinerea Aurivillius, 1905
- Haplopacha lunata Dupont, Simonsen & Zilli, 2016
- Haplopacha ndoumoi Dupont, Simonsen & Zilli, 2016
- Haplopacha riftensis Dupont, Simonsen & Zilli, 2016
- Haplopacha tangani Dupont, Simonsen & Zilli, 2016
