= Gonopacha =

Scientific classification
- Kingdom: Animalia
- Phylum: Arthropoda
- Class: Insecta
- Order: Lepidoptera
- Family: Lasiocampidae
- Genus: Gonopacha; Aurivillius, 1927

Genus of moths

Gonopacha is a genus of moths in the family Lasiocampidae. The genus was erected by Per Olof Christopher Aurivillius in 1927.

== Species ==
- Gonopacha brotoessa Holland, 1893
- Gonopacha rothschildi Aurivillius, 1927
