= Gonotrichidia =

Scientific classification
- Kingdom: Animalia
- Phylum: Arthropoda
- Class: Insecta
- Order: Lepidoptera
- Family: Lasiocampidae
- Genus: Gonotrichidia; Berio, 1937

Genus of moths

Gonotrichidia is a monotypic moth genus in the family Lasiocampidae erected by Emilio Berio in 1937. Its single species, Gonotrichidia modestissima, described by the same author in the same year, is found in the Democratic Republic of the Congo.
