= Voracia =

Scientific classification
- Kingdom: Animalia
- Phylum: Arthropoda
- Class: Insecta
- Order: Lepidoptera
- Family: Lasiocampidae
- Genus: Voracia van Eecke, 1931

Genus of moths

Voracia is a genus of moths in the family Lasiocampidae. The genus was erected by Rudolf van Eecke in 1931.

== Species ==
- Voracia brechlini Zolotuhin & Witt, 2005
- Voracia casuariniphaga van Eecke, 1931
- Voracia nusa Zolotuhin & Witt, 2005
