= Pseudophyllodes =

Scientific classification
- Kingdom: Animalia
- Phylum: Arthropoda
- Class: Insecta
- Order: Lepidoptera
- Family: Lasiocampidae
- Genus: Pseudophyllodes; Bethune-Baker, 1910

Genus of moths

Pseudophyllodes is a genus of moths in the family Lasiocampidae. The genus was erected by George Thomas Bethune-Baker in 1910.

== Species ==
- Pseudophyllodes babooni Bethune-Baker, 1908
- Pseudophyllodes cardinalis Holloway, 1976
- Pseudophyllodes castanea Joicey & Talbot, 1917
- Pseudophyllodes dinawa Bethune-Baker, 1904
- Pseudophyllodes hades Bethune-Baker, 1908
- Pseudophyllodes mafala Bethune-Baker, 1908
- Pseudophyllodes melanospilotus Joicey & Talbot, 1917
- Pseudophyllodes nigrostrigata Bethune-Baker, 1910
- Pseudophyllodes purpureocastanea Rothschild, 1916
- Pseudophyllodes rubiginea Bethune-Baker, 1904
