= Batatara =

Scientific classification
- Kingdom: Animalia
- Phylum: Arthropoda
- Class: Insecta
- Order: Lepidoptera
- Family: Lasiocampidae
- Genus: Batatara; Walker, 1862

Genus of moths

Batatara is a genus of moths in the family Lasiocampidae first described by Francis Walker in 1862.
