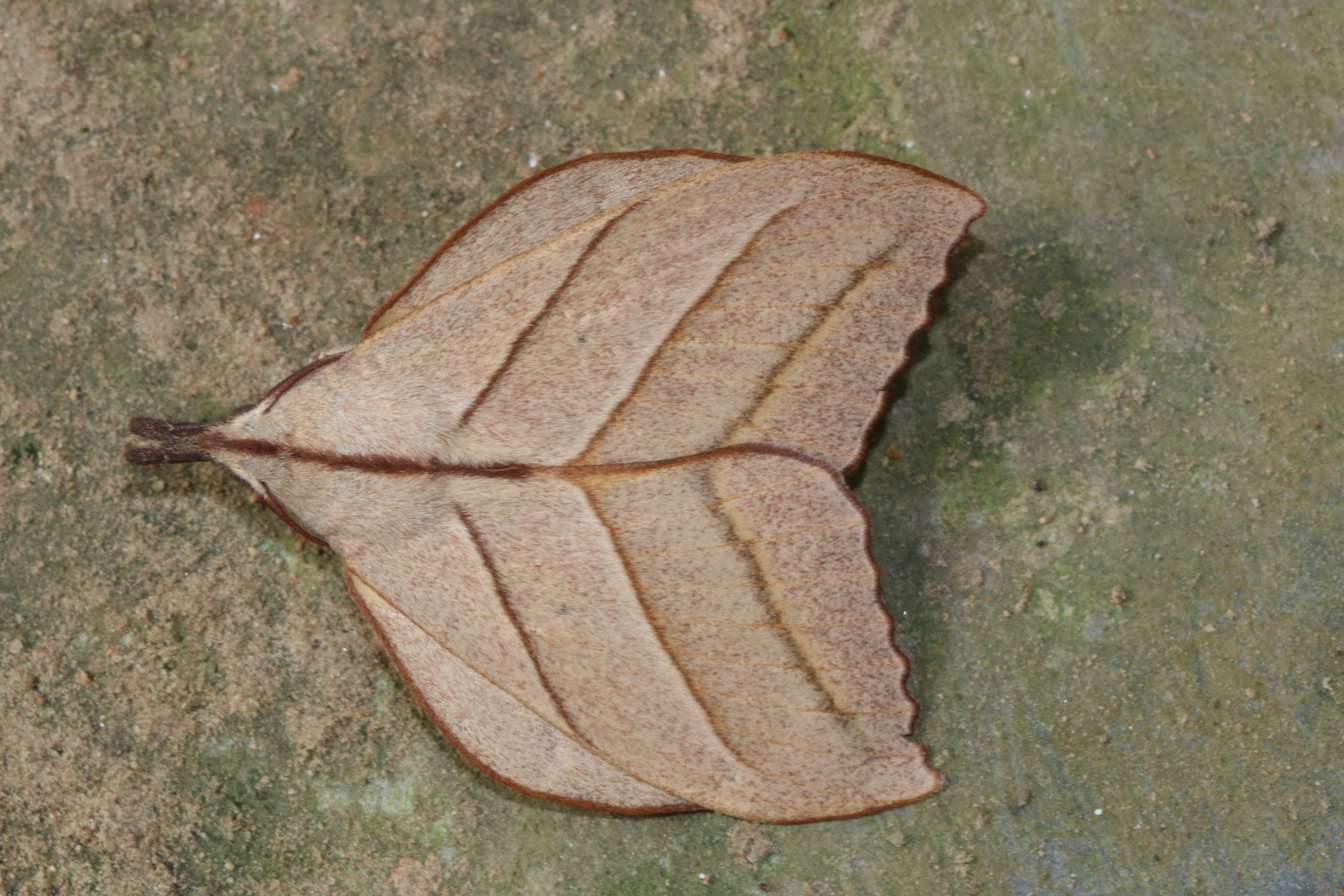

Scientific classification
- Kingdom: Animalia
- Phylum: Arthropoda
- Clade: Pancrustacea
- Class: Insecta
- Order: Lepidoptera
- Family: Lasiocampidae
- Genus: Arguda; Moore, 1879

= Arguda =

Genus of moths

Arguda is a genus of moths in the family Lasiocampidae first described by Frederic Moore in 1879. Species are distributed in Himalayan regions and Nilgiri Mountains of India, Sri Lanka, Myanmar, the Philippines, Singapore and Australia.

== Description ==
Palpi very long. Antennae with branches gradually decreasing to apex. Mid and hind tibia with minute terminal spur pairs. Forewings are broad with rather erect outer margin. Veins 6 and 7 from angle of cell. The stalk of veins 9 and 10 is short. Hindwings with veins 4 and 5 from cell, vein 8 almost touching 7. There are slight accessory costal veinlets.

== Species ==
- Arguda angulata
- Arguda decurtata
- Arguda dodongi
- Arguda era
- Arguda erectilinea
- Arguda formosae
- Arguda insulindiana
- Arguda rectilinea
- Arguda rosemariae
- Arguda sandrae
- Arguda sumatrana
- Arguda tayana
- Arguda thaica
- Arguda vinata
