= Pachymetana =

Scientific classification
- Kingdom: Animalia
- Phylum: Arthropoda
- Clade: Pancrustacea
- Class: Insecta
- Order: Lepidoptera
- Family: Lasiocampidae
- Genus: Pachymetana; Strand, 1912

Genus of moths

Pachymetana is a genus of moths in the family Lasiocampidae. The genus was erected by Strand in 1912.

== Species ==
- Pachymetana argenteoguttata Aurivillius, 1909
- Pachymetana baldasseronii Berio, 1937
- Pachymetana carnegiei Tams, 1929
- Pachymetana custodella Kiriakoff, 1965
- Pachymetana custodita Strand, 1912
- Pachymetana guttata Aurivillius, 1914
- Pachymetana horridula Tams, 1925
- Pachymetana joiceyi Tams, 1925
- Pachymetana lamborni Aurivillius, 1915
- Pachymetana neavei Aurivillius, 1915
- Pachymetana niveoplaga Aurivillius, 1900
- Pachymetana nyassana Aurivillius, 1909
- Pachymetana sanguicincta Aurivillius, 1901
