= Anchirithra =

Scientific classification
- Kingdom: Animalia
- Phylum: Arthropoda
- Class: Insecta
- Order: Lepidoptera
- Family: Lasiocampidae
- Genus: Anchirithra; Butler, 1878

Genus of moths

Anchirithra is a genus of moths in the family Lasiocampidae. The genus was erected by Arthur Gardiner Butler in 1878.

== Species ==
- Anchirithra insignis Butler, 1878
- Anchirithra pallescens
- Anchirithra punctuligera Mabille, 1879
- Anchirithra viettei de Lajonquière, 1970
