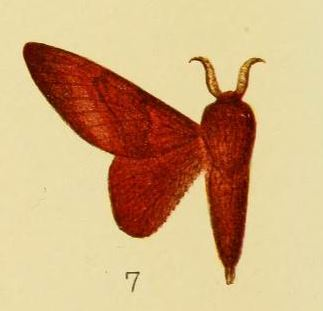
- Pseudometa schultzei

Scientific classification
- Kingdom: Animalia
- Phylum: Arthropoda
- Class: Insecta
- Order: Lepidoptera
- Family: Lasiocampidae
- Subfamily: Lasiocampinae
- Genus: Pseudometa; Aurivillius, 1901

Synonyms
- Alenella Strand, 1912

= Pseudometa =

Genus of moths

Pseudometa is a genus of moths in the family Lasiocampidae. The genus was erected by Per Olof Christopher Aurivillius in 1901. The Global Biodiversity Information Facility gives this genus name as a synonym of the spider genus Chrysometa.

== Species ==
- Pseudometa andersoni
- Pseudometa basalis
- Pseudometa canescens
- Pseudometa castanea
- Pseudometa choba
- Pseudometa concava
- Pseudometa dollmani
- Pseudometa erythrina
- Pseudometa jordani
- Pseudometa leonina
- Pseudometa minima
- Pseudometa nigricans
- Pseudometa oinopa
- Pseudometa pagetodes
- Pseudometa patagiata
- Pseudometa plinthochroa
- Pseudometa punctipennis
- Pseudometa schultzei
- Pseudometa scythropa
- Pseudometa tenebra
- Pseudometa thysanodicha
- Pseudometa viola
