= Odontocraspis =

Scientific classification
- Kingdom: Animalia
- Phylum: Arthropoda
- Class: Insecta
- Order: Lepidoptera
- Family: Lasiocampidae
- Genus: Odontocraspis; Swinhoe, 1894
- Species: O. hasora

Binomial name
- Odontocraspis hasora Swinhoe, 1894

Genus of moths

Odontocraspis is a monotypic moth genus in the family Lasiocampidae first described by Swinhoe in 1894. Its single species, Odontocraspis hasora, described by the same author in the same year, is found from the Khasi Hills of India to the Sunda Islands of Borneo.
