= Cerberolebeda =

Scientific classification
- Kingdom: Animalia
- Phylum: Arthropoda
- Clade: Pancrustacea
- Class: Insecta
- Order: Lepidoptera
- Family: Lasiocampidae
- Genus: Cerberolebeda; Zolotuhin, 1995
- Species: C. styx

Binomial name
- Cerberolebeda styx Zolotuhin, 1995

Genus of moths

Cerberolebeda is a monotypic moth genus in the family Lasiocampidae described by Vadim V. Zolotuhin in 1995. Its single species, Cerberolebeda styx, described by the same author in the same year, is found in eastern India, Myanmar, northern Thailand, northern Laos, northern Vietnam and Hainan, China.
