= Eteinopla =

Scientific classification
- Kingdom: Animalia
- Phylum: Arthropoda
- Class: Insecta
- Order: Lepidoptera
- Family: Lasiocampidae
- Genus: Eteinopla de Lajonquiere, 1979

Genus of moths

Eteinopla is a genus of moths in the family Lasiocampidae. The genus was erected by Yves de Lajonquière in 1979.

== Species ==
- Eteinopla obscura De Lajonquière, 1979
- Eteinopla signata Moore, 1879
