= Chionodiptera =

Scientific classification
- Kingdom: Animalia
- Phylum: Arthropoda
- Class: Insecta
- Order: Lepidoptera
- Family: Lasiocampidae
- Genus: Chionodiptera de Lajonquière, 1972

Genus of moths

Chionodiptera is a genus of moths in the family Lasiocampidae. The genus was erected by Yves de Lajonquière in 1972.

== Species ==
- Chionodiptera nivea de Lajonquière, 1972
- Chionodiptera virginalis Viette, 1962
