= Chionopsyche =

Scientific classification
- Kingdom: Animalia
- Phylum: Arthropoda
- Class: Insecta
- Order: Lepidoptera
- Family: Lasiocampidae
- Genus: Chionopsyche; Aurivillius, 1909

Genus of moths

Chionopsyche is a genus of moths in the family Lasiocampidae. The genus was erected by Per Olof Christopher Aurivillius in 1909.

== Species ==
- Chionopsyche admirabile Zolotuhin, 2010
- Chionopsyche grisea Aurivillius, 1914
- Chionopsyche montana Aurivillius, 1909
