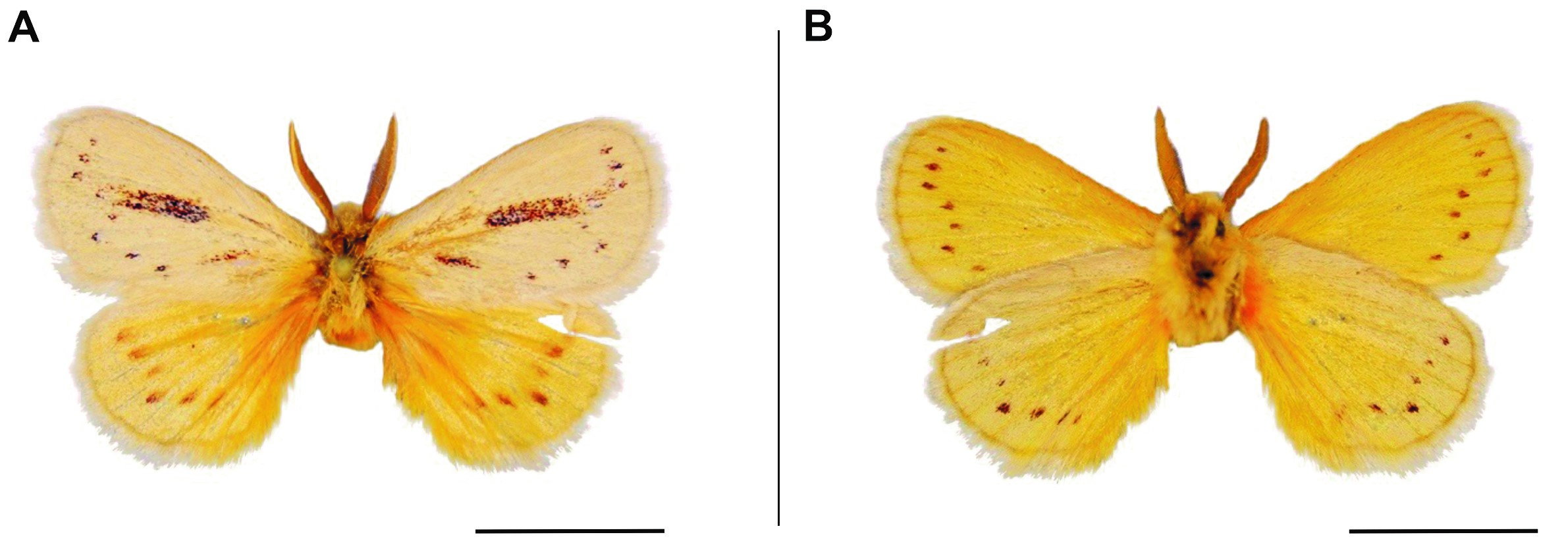

Scientific classification
- Kingdom: Animalia
- Phylum: Arthropoda
- Class: Insecta
- Order: Lepidoptera
- Family: Lasiocampidae
- Genus: Laeliopsis; Aurivillius, 1911

= Laeliopsis =

Genus of moths

Laeliopsis is a genus of moths in the family Lasiocampidae. The genus was erected by Per Olof Christopher Aurivillius in 1911.

== Species ==
- Laeliopsis erythrura Aurivillius, 1914
- Laeliopsis gemmatus Wichgraf, 1921
- Laeliopsis maculigera Strand, 1913
- Laeliopsis punctuligera Aurivillius, 1911
