= Melopla =

Scientific classification
- Kingdom: Animalia
- Phylum: Arthropoda
- Class: Insecta
- Order: Lepidoptera
- Family: Lasiocampidae
- Genus: Melopla de Lajonquière, 1972

Genus of moths

Melopla is a genus of moths in the family Lasiocampidae. It was erected by Yves de Lajonquière in 1972.

== Species ==
- Melopla abhorrens de Lajonquière, 1972
- Melopla ochracea Viette, 1962
- Melopla sparsipuncta Viette, 1962
