= Endacantha =

Scientific classification
- Kingdom: Animalia
- Phylum: Arthropoda
- Class: Insecta
- Order: Lepidoptera
- Family: Lasiocampidae
- Genus: Endacantha de Lajonquière, 1970

Genus of moths

Endacantha is a genus of moths in the family Lasiocampidae. The genus was erected by Yves de Lajonquière in 1970.

== Species ==
- Endacantha albovirgata de Lajonquière, 1970
- Endacantha cleptis Hering, 1928
- Endacantha moka de Lajonquière, 1970
