= Hypopacha =

Scientific classification
- Kingdom: Animalia
- Phylum: Arthropoda
- Class: Insecta
- Order: Lepidoptera
- Family: Lasiocampidae
- Genus: Hypopacha; Neumoegen & Dyar, 1893
- Species: H. grisea

Binomial name
- Hypopacha grisea Neumoegen, 1882

Synonyms
- Cnethocampa grisea Neumoegen, 1882

Genus of moths

Hypopacha is a monotypic moth genus in the family Lasiocampidae. The genus was erected by Berthold Neumoegen and Harrison Gray Dyar Jr. in 1893. Its only species, Hypopacha grisea, described by Berthold Neumoegen in 1882, is found in the US states of California and Arizona.
