= Sporostigena =

Scientific classification
- Kingdom: Animalia
- Phylum: Arthropoda
- Class: Insecta
- Order: Lepidoptera
- Family: Lasiocampidae
- Genus: Sporostigena; Bethune-Baker, 1904

Genus of moths

Sporostigena is a genus of moths in the family Lasiocampidae. The genus was erected by George Thomas Bethune-Baker in 1904.

== Species ==
- Sporostigena ninayi Bethune-Baker, 1916
- Sporostigena trilineata Joicey & Talbot, 1916
- Sporostigena uniformis Bethune-Baker, 1904
