= Raphipeza =

Scientific classification
- Kingdom: Animalia
- Phylum: Arthropoda
- Class: Insecta
- Order: Lepidoptera
- Family: Lasiocampidae
- Genus: Raphipeza; Butler, 1880

Genus of moths

Raphipeza is a genus of moths in the family Lasiocampidae. The genus was erected by Arthur Gardiner Butler in 1880.

== Species ==
- Raphipeza echinata Saalmüller, 1879
- Raphipeza orientalis Viette, 1962
- Raphipeza perineti Viette, 1962
- Raphipeza pratti Viette, 1962
- Raphipeza turbata Butler, 1879
