= Prorifrons =

Scientific classification
- Kingdom: Animalia
- Phylum: Arthropoda
- Class: Insecta
- Order: Lepidoptera
- Family: Lasiocampidae
- Genus: Prorifrons; Barnes & McDunnough, 1911

Genus of moths

Prorifrons is a genus of moths in the family Lasiocampidae. The genus was erected by William Barnes and James Halliday McDunnough in 1911.

== Species ==
- Prorifrons angustipennis Schaus, 1911
- Prorifrons antonia Schaus, 1911
- Prorifrons castullux Dyar, 1915
- Prorifrons championi Druce, 1897
- Prorifrons conradti Druce, 1894
- Prorifrons costaricensis Draudt, 1927
- Prorifrons crenulata Draudt, 1927
- Prorifrons crossoea Druce, 1894
- Prorifrons doeri Schaus, 1892
- Prorifrons granula Schaus, 1924
- Prorifrons gustanda Dyar, 1911
- Prorifrons hoppi Draudt, 1927
- Prorifrons lemoulti Schaus, 1906
- Prorifrons lineata Weymer & Maassen, 1890
- Prorifrons melana Dognin, 1921
- Prorifrons mulleri Draudt, 1927
- Prorifrons negrita Dognin, 1921
- Prorifrons nox Druce, 1897
- Prorifrons peruviana Druce, 1906
- Prorifrons phedima Stoll, 1782
- Prorifrons prosper Dyar, 1907
- Prorifrons rufescens Schaus, 1911
- Prorifrons songoensis Draudt, 1927
- Prorifrons tamsi Draudt, 1927
- Prorifrons tremula Schaus, 1911
- Prorifrons vibrans Schaus, 1911
