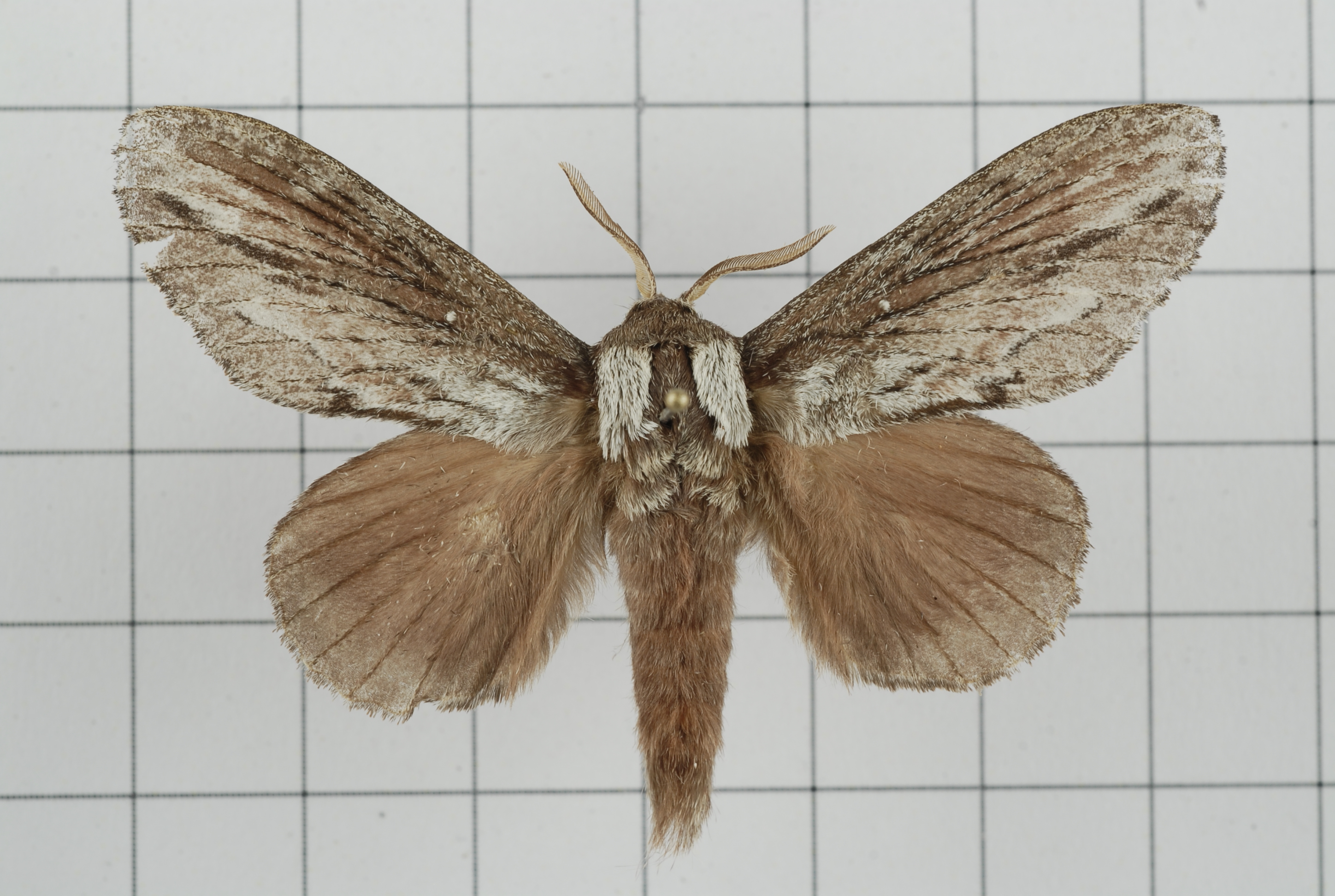

Scientific classification
- Kingdom: Animalia
- Phylum: Arthropoda
- Clade: Pancrustacea
- Class: Insecta
- Order: Lepidoptera
- Family: Lasiocampidae
- Genus: Pachypasoides; Matsumura, 1927
- Species: P. albinotum

Binomial name
- Pachypasoides albinotum Matsumura, 1927

= Pachypasoides =

Genus of moths

Pachypasoides is a monotypic genus of moth in the family Lasiocampidae described by Shōnen Matsumura in 1927. Its single species, Pachypasoides albinotum, described by the same author in the same year, is found in Taiwan.
