= Bombycopsis =

Scientific classification
- Kingdom: Animalia
- Phylum: Arthropoda
- Class: Insecta
- Order: Lepidoptera
- Family: Lasiocampidae
- Genus: Bombycopsis; C. & R. Felder, 1874

Genus of moths

Bombycopsis is a genus of moths in the family Lasiocampidae. The genus was erected by father and son entomologists Cajetan and Rudolf Felder.

== Species ==
- Bombycopsis abyssinica Joannou & Krüger, 2009
- Bombycopsis accola Joannou & Krüger, 2009
- Bombycopsis allophyes Joannou & Krüger, 2009
- Bombycopsis alpina Joannou & Krüger, 2009
- Bombycopsis belzebub Joannou & Krüger, 2009
- Bombycopsis bipars Walker, 1855
- Bombycopsis birketsmithi Joannou & Krüger, 2009
- Bombycopsis blanda Joannou & Krüger, 2009
- Bombycopsis capicola Aurivillius, 1921
- Bombycopsis caryoxantha Joannou & Krüger, 2009
- Bombycopsis castaneipennis Joannou & Krüger, 2009
- Bombycopsis coenophanes Joannou & Krüger, 2009
- Bombycopsis conspersa Aurivillius, 1905
- Bombycopsis curvilinea Joannou & Krüger, 2009
- Bombycopsis dargei Joannou & Krüger, 2009
- Bombycopsis exigua Joannou & Krüger, 2009
- Bombycopsis funebris Joannou & Krüger, 2009
- Bombycopsis fuscata Joannou & Krüger, 2009
- Bombycopsis gallagheri Wiltshire & Legrain, 1997
- Bombycopsis geertsemai Joannou & Krüger, 2009
- Bombycopsis germana Joannou & Krüger, 2009
- Bombycopsis hyatti Tams, 1931
- Bombycopsis indecora Walker, 1865
- Bombycopsis kalongensis Joannou & Krüger, 2009
- Bombycopsis kenema Joannou & Krüger, 2009
- Bombycopsis kikuyuensis Joannou & Krüger, 2009
- Bombycopsis kipengerica Joannou & Krüger, 2009
- Bombycopsis knysna Joannou & Krüger, 2009
- Bombycopsis larseni Wiltshire & Legrain, 1997
- Bombycopsis latipennis Joannou & Krüger, 2009
- Bombycopsis ledereri (Koçak, 1981)
- Bombycopsis lepalea Joannou & Krüger, 2009
- Bombycopsis lepta Tams, 1931
- Bombycopsis leptifictrix Joannou & Krüger, 2009
- Bombycopsis manengubica Joannou & Krüger, 2009
- Bombycopsis manica Joannou & Krüger, 2009
- Bombycopsis manowensis Joannou & Krüger, 2009
- Bombycopsis melaena Joannou & Krüger, 2009
- Bombycopsis mesochrotes Joannou & Krüger, 2009
- Bombycopsis metallicus Distant, 1898
- Bombycopsis murphyi Joannou & Krüger, 2009
- Bombycopsis ndolae Joannou & Krüger, 2009
- Bombycopsis nephelograpta Joannou & Krüger, 2009
- Bombycopsis nigrovittata
- Bombycopsis nubila Joannou & Krüger, 2009
- Bombycopsis obscurior Joannou & Krüger, 2009
- Bombycopsis occidentalis Joannou & Krüger, 2009
- Bombycopsis ochroleuca Felder, 1874
- Bombycopsis oligolepis Joannou & Krüger, 2009
- Bombycopsis orthogramma
- Bombycopsis pallida Joannou & Krüger, 2009
- Bombycopsis perstrigata Joannou & Krüger, 2009
- Bombycopsis pithex Joannou & Krüger, 2009
- Bombycopsis pittawayi Wiltshire & Legrain, 1997
- Bombycopsis punctimarginata Joannou & Krüger, 2009
- Bombycopsis respondens Joannou & Krüger, 2009
- Bombycopsis robusta Joannou & Krüger, 2009
- Bombycopsis rubescens Joannou & Krüger, 2009
- Bombycopsis rufa Joannou & Krüger, 2009
- Bombycopsis rufobrunnea Joannou & Krüger, 2009
- Bombycopsis ruwenzorica Joannou & Krüger, 2009
- Bombycopsis seydeli Joannou & Krüger, 2009
- Bombycopsis sheppardi Joannou & Krüger, 2009
- Bombycopsis sodalis Joannou & Krüger, 2009
- Bombycopsis stepheni Joannou & Krüger, 2009
- Bombycopsis swaenepoeli Joannou & Krüger, 2009
- Bombycopsis tenera Joannou & Krüger, 2009
- Bombycopsis tephrobaphes Joannou & Krüger, 2009
- Bombycopsis tessmanni Joannou & Krüger, 2009
- Bombycopsis tsitsikama Joannou & Krüger, 2009
- Bombycopsis tukuyuensis Joannou & Krüger, 2009
- Bombycopsis ulugurica Joannou & Krüger, 2009
- Bombycopsis usambarensis Joannou & Krüger, 2009
- Bombycopsis ustulistriga Joannou & Krüger, 2009
- Bombycopsis variabilis Joannou & Krüger, 2009
- Bombycopsis varians Joannou & Krüger, 2009
- Bombycopsis varidentata Joannou & Krüger, 2009
- Bombycopsis venosa Butler, 1895
- Bombycopsis venosoides Joannou & Krüger, 2009
- Bombycopsis vicina Joannou & Krüger, 2009
- Bombycopsis watulegei Joannou & Krüger, 2009
- Bombycopsis zombina Joannou & Krüger, 2009
- Bombycopsis zwicki Joannou & Krüger, 2009
