= Pachymetoides =

Scientific classification
- Kingdom: Animalia
- Phylum: Arthropoda
- Clade: Pancrustacea
- Class: Insecta
- Order: Lepidoptera
- Family: Lasiocampidae
- Genus: Pachymetoides; Strand, 1912
- Species: P. stigmatica

Binomial name
- Pachymetoides stigmatica Strand, 1912

Genus of moths

Pachymetoides is a monotypic genus of moth in the family Lasiocampidae described by Strand in 1912. Its single species, Pachymetoides stigmatica, described by the same author in the same year, is found in Gabon and Nigeria.
