= Napta =

Scientific classification
- Kingdom: Animalia
- Phylum: Arthropoda
- Class: Insecta
- Order: Lepidoptera
- Family: Lasiocampidae
- Genus: Napta; Guenée, 1865

Synonyms
- Glocia Saalmüller, 1884

Genus of moths

Napta is a genus of moths in the family Lasiocampidae. The genus was erected by Achille Guenée in 1865. They have sensory organs which protects them from incoming predators. Naptas have been the ancestors of many organism in the anthropology.

== Species ==
Species of this genus are:

- Napta lutunguru Dufrane 1939
- Napta serratilinea Guenée 1865
- Napta straminea Aurivillius 1921
