= Hallicarnia =

Scientific classification
- Kingdom: Animalia
- Phylum: Arthropoda
- Class: Insecta
- Order: Lepidoptera
- Family: Lasiocampidae
- Genus: Hallicarnia; Kirby, 1892
- Species: H. albipectus

Binomial name
- Hallicarnia albipectus Walker, 1855

Synonyms
- Generic; Polymona Walker, 1855; Specific; Gastropacha albipectus Walker, 1855; Polymona hamata Walker, 1855

Genus of moths

Hallicarnia is a monotypic moth genus in the family Lasiocampidae first described by William Forsell Kirby in 1892. Its only species, Hallicarnia albipectus, was described by Francis Walker in 1855. It is found in
