= Sphinta =

Scientific classification
- Kingdom: Animalia
- Phylum: Arthropoda
- Class: Insecta
- Order: Lepidoptera
- Family: Lasiocampidae
- Genus: Sphinta; Schaus, 1904

Genus of moths

Sphinta is a genus of moths in the family Lasiocampidae. The genus was erected by William Schaus in 1904.

== Species ==
- Sphinta cossoides Schaus, 1904
- Sphinta schausiana E. D. Jones, 1912
