= Archaeopacha =

Scientific classification
- Kingdom: Animalia
- Phylum: Arthropoda
- Clade: Pancrustacea
- Class: Insecta
- Order: Lepidoptera
- Family: Lasiocampidae
- Genus: Archaeopacha; Aurivillius, 1925
- Species: A. obsoleta

Binomial name
- Archaeopacha obsoleta Aurivillius, 1925

Genus of moths

Archaeopacha is a monotypic genus of moth in the family Lasiocampidae, first described by Per Olof Christopher Aurivillius in 1925. Its only species, Archaeopacha obsoleta, was described in the same publication. It is found in the Democratic Republic of the Congo.
