= Pyrosis =

Scientific classification
- Domain: Eukaryota
- Kingdom: Animalia
- Phylum: Arthropoda
- Class: Insecta
- Order: Lepidoptera
- Family: Lasiocampidae
- Subfamily: Lasiocampinae
- Tribe: Gastropachini
- Genus: Pyrosis; Oberthür, 1880

Genus of moths

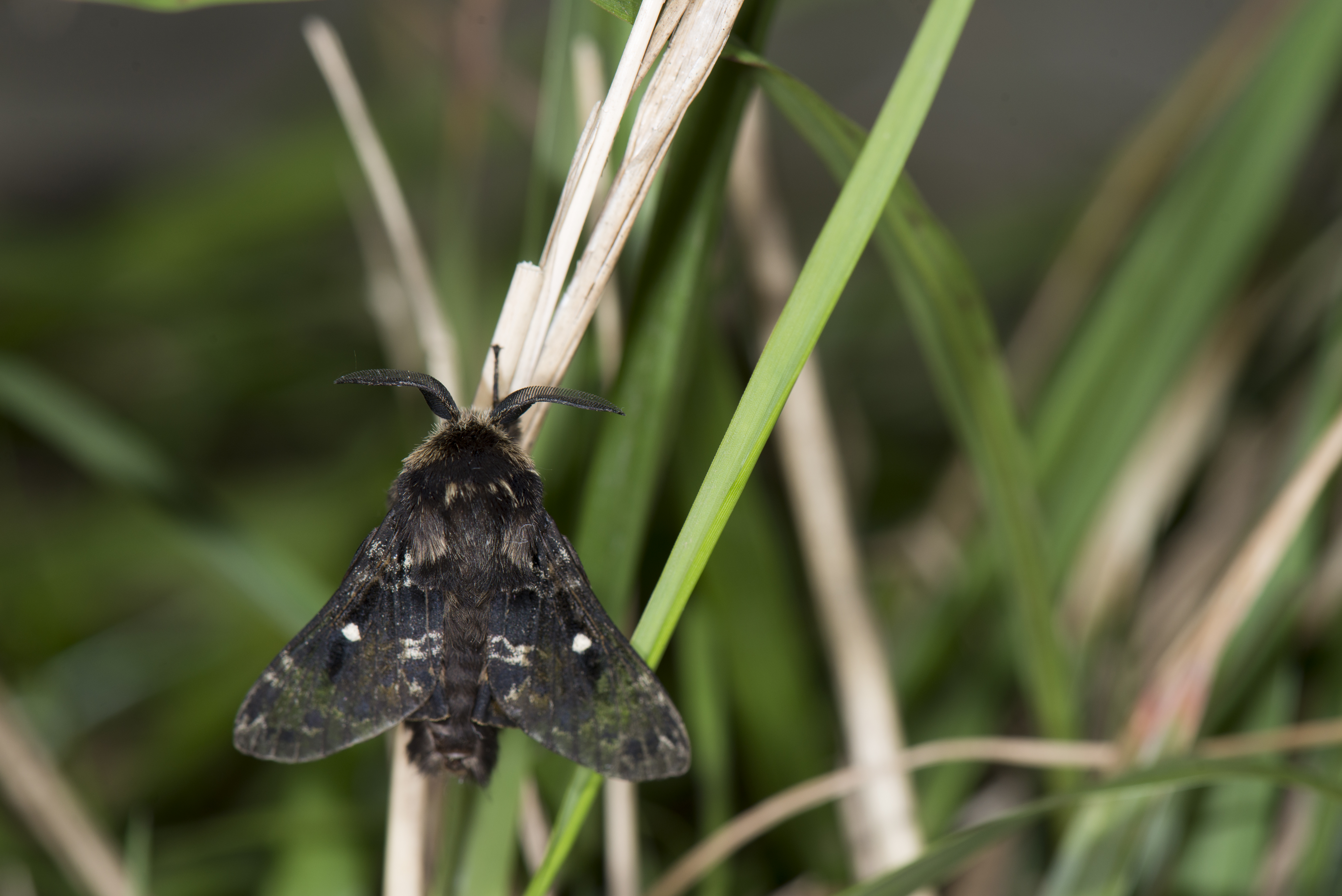
Pyrosis wangi

Pyrosis is a genus of moths in the family Lasiocampidae. The genus was first described by Oberthür in 1880. The moths live in Asia.

== Species ==
- Pyrosis borneana (Holloway, 1987)
- Pyrosis dierli Zolotuhin & Witt, 2000
- Pyrosis eximia Oberthür, 1880
- Pyrosis hreblayi Zolotuhin & Witt, 2000
- Pyrosis hyalata Zolotuhin & Witt, 2000
- Pyrosis fulviplaga (De Joannis, 1929)
- Pyrosis idiota (Graeser, 1888)
- Pyrosis matronata Zolotuhin & Witt, 2000
- Pyrosis ni (Wang & Fan, 1995)
- Pyrosis potanini Alpheraky, 1895
- Pyrosis rotundipennis (De Joannis, 1930)
- Pyrosis undulosa (Walker, 1855)
- Pyrosis wangi Zolotuhin & Witt, 2007
