= Dollmania =

Scientific classification
- Kingdom: Animalia
- Phylum: Arthropoda
- Clade: Pancrustacea
- Class: Insecta
- Order: Lepidoptera
- Family: Lasiocampidae
- Genus: Dollmania; Tams, 1930

Genus of moths

Dollmania is a genus of moths in the family Lasiocampidae. The genus was erected by Tams in 1930.

== Species ==
- Dollmania cuprea Distant, 1897
- Dollmania flavia Fawcett, 1915
- Dollmania marwitzi Strand, 1913
- Dollmania plinthochroa Tams, 1930
- Dollmania purpurascens Aurivillius, 1908
- Dollmania reussi Strand, 1913
