= Metadula =

Scientific classification
- Kingdom: Animalia
- Phylum: Arthropoda
- Class: Insecta
- Order: Lepidoptera
- Family: Lasiocampidae
- Genus: Metadula; Walker, 1865
- Species: M. indecisa

Binomial name
- Metadula indecisa Walker, 1865

Genus of moths

Metadula is a monotypic moth genus in the family Lasiocampidae first described by Francis Walker in 1865. Its only species, Metadula indecisa, described by the same author in the same year, is found in the region around the Zambezi rivier.
