= Odontogama =

Scientific classification
- Kingdom: Animalia
- Phylum: Arthropoda
- Class: Insecta
- Order: Lepidoptera
- Family: Lasiocampidae
- Genus: Odontogama; Aurivillius, 1915

Genus of moths

Odontogama is a genus of moths in the family Lasiocampidae. The genus was erected by Per Olof Christopher Aurivillius in 1915.

== Species ==
- Odontogama milleri Tams, 1926
- Odontogama nigricans Aurivillius, 1915
- Odontogama superba Aurivillius, 1914
