= Crexa =

Scientific classification
- Kingdom: Animalia
- Phylum: Arthropoda
- Class: Insecta
- Order: Lepidoptera
- Family: Lasiocampidae
- Genus: Crexa; Walker, 1866

Genus of moths

Crexa is a genus of moths in the family Lasiocampidae. The genus was erected by Francis Walker in 1866.

== Species ==
- Crexa acedesta Turner, 1911
- Crexa dianipha Turner, 1911
- Crexa epipasta Swinhoe
- Crexa fola Swinhoe, 1902
- Crexa hyaloessa Turner, 1902
- Crexa macqueeni Turner, 1936
- Crexa macroptila Turner, 1911
- Crexa punctigera Walker, 1855
- Crexa rhonda Swinhoe
- Crexa subnotata Walker, 1869
