= Strumella (moth) =

Scientific classification
- Kingdom: Animalia
- Phylum: Arthropoda
- Class: Insecta
- Order: Lepidoptera
- Family: Lasiocampidae
- Genus: Strumella; Wallengren, 1858

Genus of moths

Strumella is a genus of moths in the family Lasiocampidae, first described by Wallengren in 1858.
