= Ocinaropsis =

Scientific classification
- Kingdom: Animalia
- Phylum: Arthropoda
- Class: Insecta
- Order: Lepidoptera
- Family: Lasiocampidae
- Genus: Ocinaropsis; Aurivillius, 1905
- Species: O. obscura

Binomial name
- Ocinaropsis obscura Aurivillius, 1905

Genus of moths

Ocinaropsis is a monotypic moth genus in the family Lasiocampidae erected by Per Olof Christopher Aurivillius in 1905. Its single species, Ocinaropsis obscura, described by the same author in the same year, is found in KwaZulu-Natal, South Africa.
