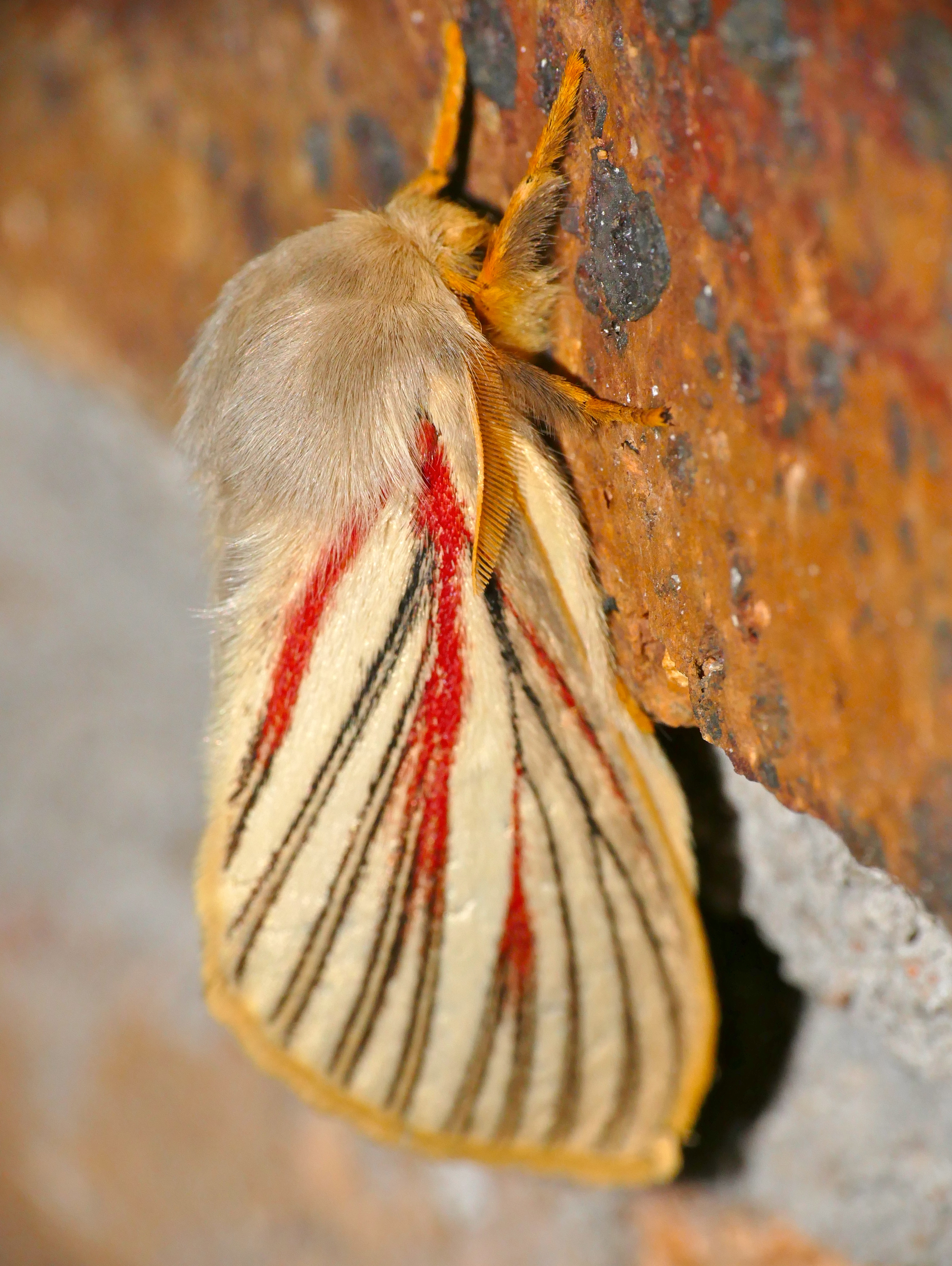
- Black-lined Eggar (Grammodora nigrolineata)

Scientific classification
- Kingdom: Animalia
- Phylum: Arthropoda
- Class: Insecta
- Order: Lepidoptera
- Family: Lasiocampidae
- Genus: Grammodora; Aurivillius, 1927

= Grammodora =

Genus of moths

Grammodora is a monotypic moth genus in the family Lasiocampidae erected by Per Olof Christopher Aurivillius in 1927. Its only species, Grammodora nigrolineata, had been described by the same author but in 1890.
