= Epitrabala =

Scientific classification
- Kingdom: Animalia
- Phylum: Arthropoda
- Class: Insecta
- Order: Lepidoptera
- Family: Lasiocampidae
- Genus: Epitrabala; Hering, 1932
- Species: E. argyrostigma

Binomial name
- Epitrabala argyrostigma Hering, 1932

Genus of moths

Epitrabala is a monotypic moth genus in the family Lasiocampidae erected by Erich Martin Hering in 1932. Its single species, Epitrabala argyrostigma, was described by the same author in the same year. It is found in the Democratic Republic of the Congo.
