= Pachymeta =

Scientific classification
- Kingdom: Animalia
- Phylum: Arthropoda
- Class: Insecta
- Order: Lepidoptera
- Family: Lasiocampidae
- Genus: Pachymeta; Aurivillius, 1906

Genus of moths

Pachymeta is a genus of moths in the family Lasiocampidae. The genus was erected by Per Olof Christopher Aurivillius in 1906.

== Species ==
- Pachymeta capreolus Aurivillius, 1915
- Pachymeta contraria Walker, 1855
- Pachymeta immunda Holland, 1893
- Pachymeta semifasciata Aurivillius
