= Cymatopacha =

Scientific classification
- Kingdom: Animalia
- Phylum: Arthropoda
- Class: Insecta
- Order: Lepidoptera
- Family: Lasiocampidae
- Genus: Cymatopacha; Aurivillius, 1921

Genus of moths

Cymatopacha is a monotypic moth genus in the family Lasiocampidae erected by Per Olof Christopher Aurivillius in 1921. Its single species, Cymatopacha obscura, was described by the same author in the same year. It is found in Zimbabwe, Zambia and South Africa.
