= Gonobombyx =

Scientific classification
- Kingdom: Animalia
- Phylum: Arthropoda
- Class: Insecta
- Order: Lepidoptera
- Family: Lasiocampidae
- Genus: Gonobombyx; Aurivillius, 1893

Type species
- Gonobombyx angulata Aurivillius, 1893

Synonyms
- Prodonestis Holland, 1893

Genus of moths

Gonobombyx is a monotypic moth genus in the family Lasiocampidae. The genus was erected by Per Olof Christopher Aurivillius in 1893. Its single species, Gonobombyx angulata, described by the same author in the same year, is found in Cameroon.
