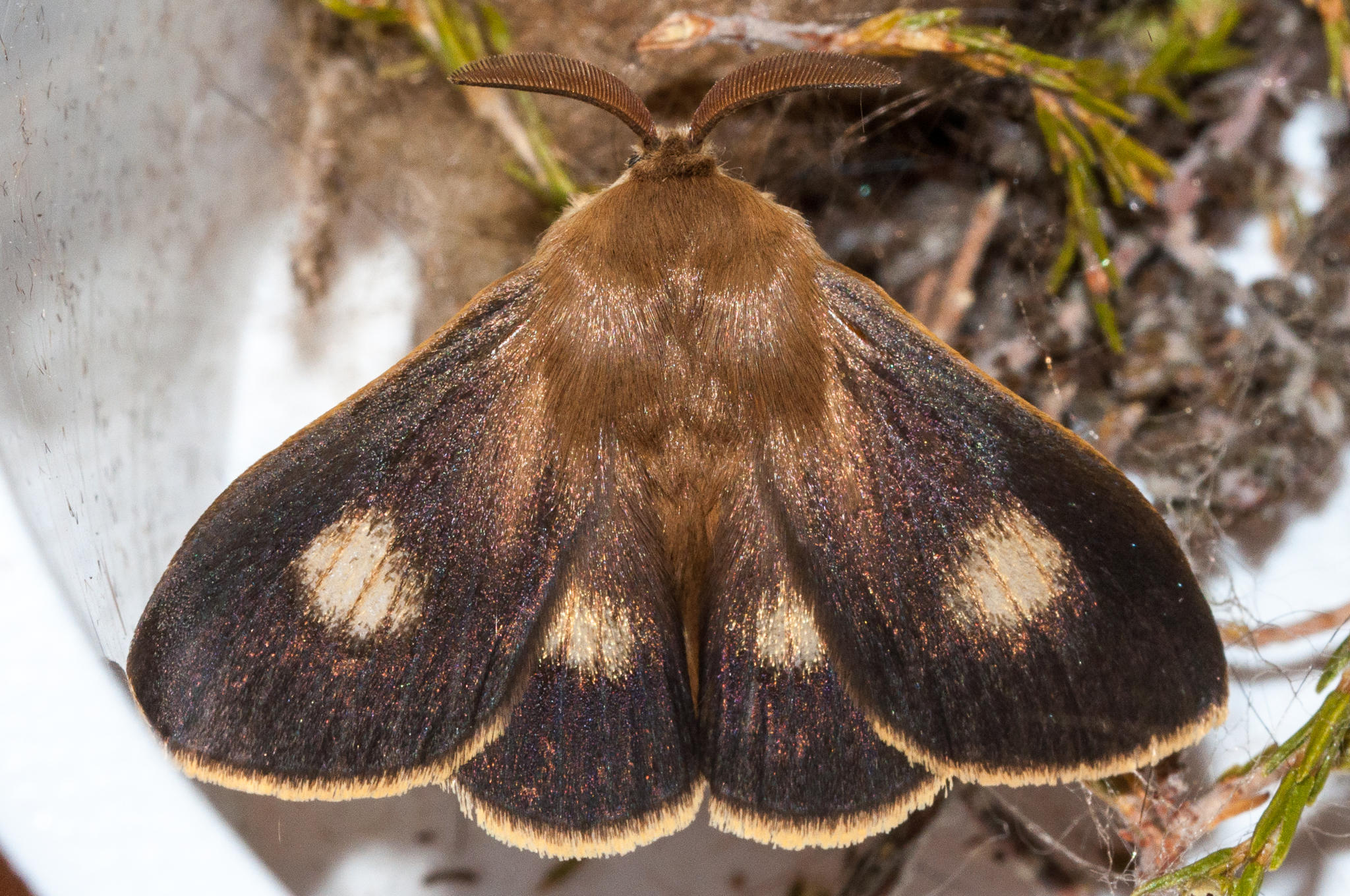
- Adult
- Larva

Scientific classification
- Kingdom: Animalia
- Phylum: Arthropoda
- Clade: Pancrustacea
- Class: Insecta
- Order: Lepidoptera
- Family: Lasiocampidae
- Genus: Mesocelis; Hübner, 1820
- Species: M. monticola

Binomial name
- Mesocelis monticola Hübner, 1820

Synonyms
- Bombyx montana Stoll, 1781; Mesocelis albiplaga (Walker, 1862); Mesocelis megaplaga Pinhey, 1973; Mesocelis montana (Cramer, 1781)

= Mesocelis =

Genus of moths

Mesocelis is a genus of moths in the family Lasiocampidae erected by Jacob Hübner in 1820. It is monotypic, with the single species, Mesocelis monticola, described by the same author in the same year. It is found in South Africa.
