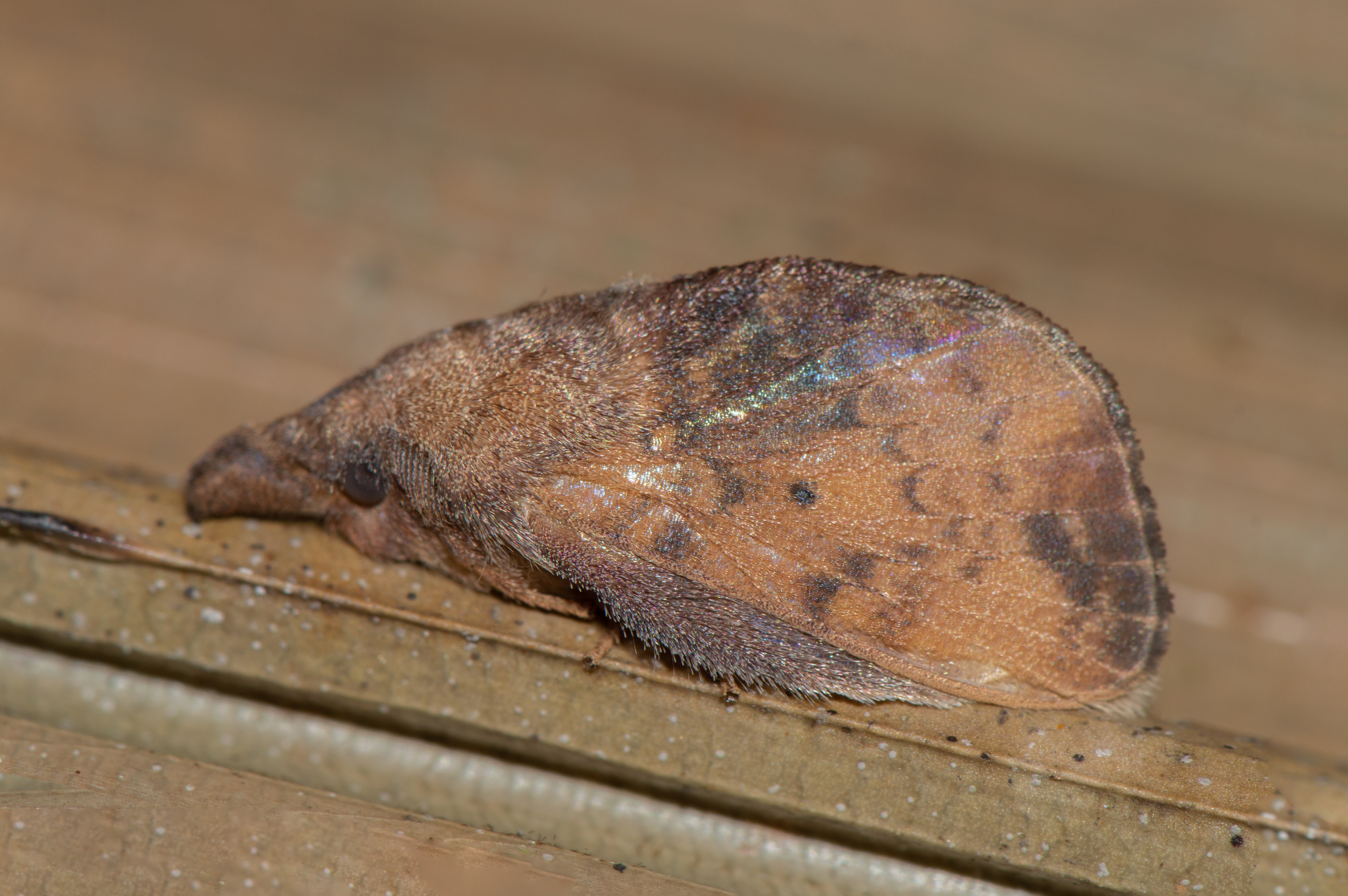
- Rhynchobombyx nasuta

Scientific classification
- Kingdom: Animalia
- Phylum: Arthropoda
- Class: Insecta
- Order: Lepidoptera
- Family: Lasiocampidae
- Genus: Rhynchobombyx; Aurivillius, 1909
- Species: R. nasuta

Binomial name
- Rhynchobombyx nasuta Aurivillius, 1908

= Rhynchobombyx =

Genus of moths

Rhynchobombyx is a monospecific moth genus in the family Lasiocampidae first described by Per Olof Christopher Aurivillius in 1909. It contains the single species Rhynchobombyx nasuta, described by the same author.
