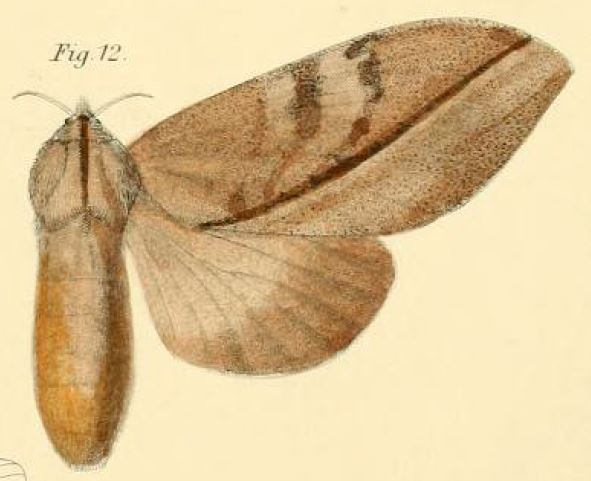
- Pachyna subfascia

Scientific classification
- Kingdom: Animalia
- Phylum: Arthropoda
- Class: Insecta
- Order: Lepidoptera
- Family: Lasiocampidae
- Genus: Pachyna; Weymer, 1892

Synonyms
- Andraphisia, Kirby, 1897

= Pachyna =

Genus of moths

Pachyna is a genus of moths in the family Lasiocampidae first described by Weymer in 1892.

== Species ==
- Pachyna bogema Zolotuhin & Gurkovich, 2009
- Pachyna crabik Zolotuhin & Gurkovich, 2009
- Pachyna satanas Zolotuhin & Gurkovich, 2009
- Pachyna subfascia Walker, 1855
