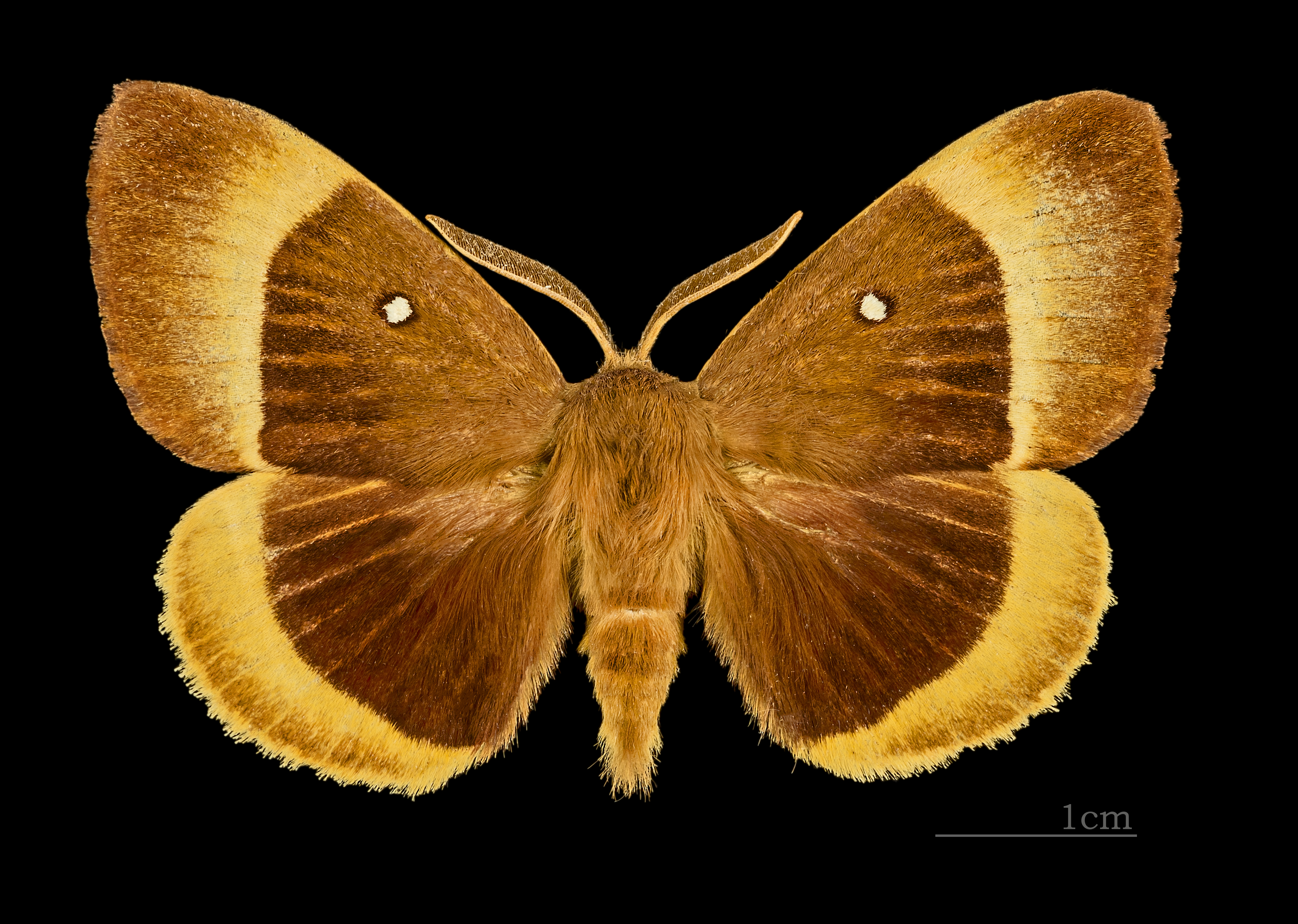

Scientific classification
- Kingdom: Animalia
- Phylum: Arthropoda
- Clade: Pancrustacea
- Class: Insecta
- Order: Lepidoptera
- Family: Lasiocampidae
- Genus: Lasiocampa; Schrank, 1802

Synonyms
- Pachygastria Hübner, [1820]; Ireocampa Rambur, 1858; Lambessa Staudinger, 1901; Macrocampa Zolotuhin, 1992

= Lasiocampa =

Species of moth

Lasiocampa is a genus of moths in the family Lasiocampidae. The genus was described by Franz von Paula Schrank in 1802.

== Species ==
Based on Lepidoptera and Some Other Life Forms:

- Lasiocampa trifolii (Denis & Schiffermüller, 1775) - grass eggar - northern Africa, Europe, Asia Minor, Iran, Turkmenistan, Kazakhstan
- Lasiocampa quercus (Linnaeus, 1758) - oak eggar - Canary Islands, Europe, Asia Minor, Caucasia, Russia, Altai
- Lasiocampa grandis (Rogenhofer, 1891) Greece, Macedonia, Asia Minor, Iran, Iraq, Syria, Israel, Egypt, Armenia
- Lasiocampa piontkovskii Sheljuzhko, 1943 Transcaucasia
- Lasiocampa eversmanni (Eversmann, 1843) southeastern Europe, southern Russia, Caucasus, Asia Minor, Ural, southern Altai, Iraq, Iran, Afghanistan
- Lasiocampa nana Staudinger, 1887 Alai, Kopet Dagh
- Lasiocampa serrula (Guenée, 1858) Spain, northern Africa, Palestine
- Lasiocampa decolorata (Klug, 1832) Morocco, Egypt, Sudan, Palestine
- Lasiocampa staudingeri (Baker, 1885) northern Africa
