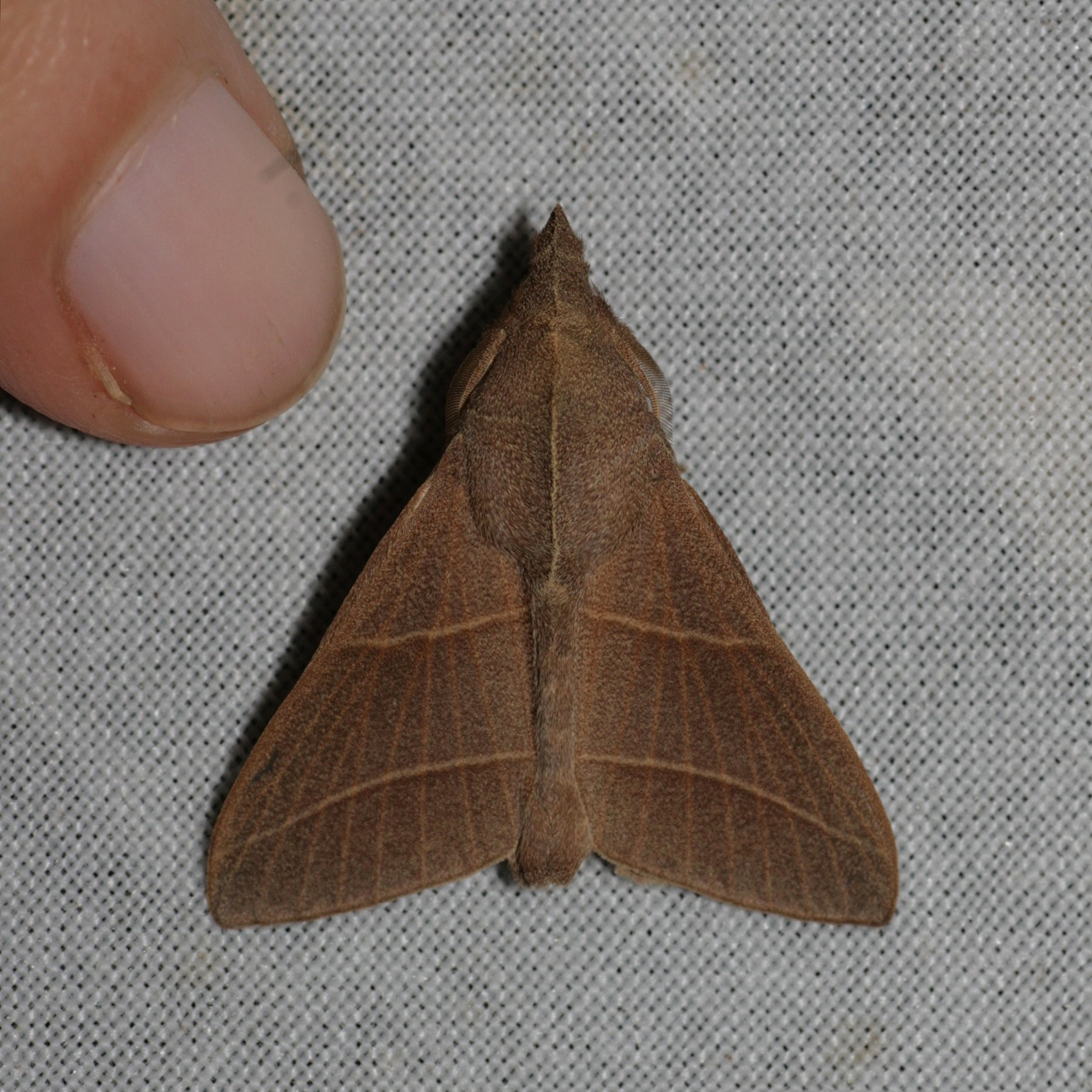
- Image of Syrastrena lanaoensis (Lasiocampidae)

Scientific classification
- Kingdom: Animalia
- Phylum: Arthropoda
- Class: Insecta
- Order: Lepidoptera
- Family: Lasiocampidae
- Genus: Syrastrena; Moore, 1884

= Syrastrena =

Genus of moths

Syrastrena is a genus of moths in the family Lasiocampidae. The genus was erected by Moore in 1884.

== Species ==
- Syrastrena lajonquieri Holloway, 1982
- Syrastrena lanaoensis Tams, 1935
- Syrastrena malaccana Tams, 1935
- Syrastrena minor Moore, 1879
- Syrastrena sumatrana Tams, 1935
- Syrastrena tamsi Holloway, 1982
