= Henometa =

Scientific classification
- Kingdom: Animalia
- Phylum: Arthropoda
- Class: Insecta
- Order: Lepidoptera
- Family: Lasiocampidae
- Genus: Henometa; Aurivillius, 1927

Genus of moths

Henometa is a monotypic moth genus in the family Lasiocampidae first described by Per Olof Christopher Aurivillius in 1927. Its single species, Henometa clarki, described by the same author in 1908, is found in what is now KwaZulu-Natal, South Africa.
