= Caeculia =

Scientific classification
- Kingdom: Animalia
- Phylum: Arthropoda
- Class: Insecta
- Order: Lepidoptera
- Family: Lasiocampidae
- Genus: Caeculia; Herrich-Schäffer, [1854]

Genus of moths

Caeculia is a genus of moths in the family Lasiocampidae. The genus was erected by Gottlieb August Wilhelm Herrich-Schäffer in 1854.
