= Argonestis =

Scientific classification
- Kingdom: Animalia
- Phylum: Arthropoda
- Clade: Pancrustacea
- Class: Insecta
- Order: Lepidoptera
- Family: Lasiocampidae
- Genus: Argonestis; Zolotuhin, 1995
- Species: A. flammans

Binomial name
- Argonestis flammans Hampson, [1893]

Genus of moths

Argonestis is a monotypic genus of moth in the family Lasiocampidae. The genus was erected by Vadim V. Zolotuhin in 1995. Its only species, Argonestis flammans, was described by George Hampson in 1893. It is found in the Indian state of Manipur.
