= Chondrostegoides =

Scientific classification
- Kingdom: Animalia
- Phylum: Arthropoda
- Class: Insecta
- Order: Lepidoptera
- Family: Lasiocampidae
- Genus: Chondrostegoides; Aurivillius, 1905

Genus of moths

Chondrostegoides is a genus of moths in the family Lasiocampidae. The genus was erected by Per Olof Christopher Aurivillius in 1905.

== Species ==
- Chondrostegoides capensis Aurivillius, 1905
- Chondrostegoides jamaka Zolotuhin, 2007
- Chondrostegoides magna Zolotuhin, 2007
- Chondrostegoides nobilorum Zolotuhin, 2007
- Chondrostegoides ruficornis Aurivillus, 1921
