= Isais =

Scientific classification
- Kingdom: Animalia
- Phylum: Arthropoda
- Class: Insecta
- Order: Lepidoptera
- Family: Lasiocampidae
- Genus: Isais; Hering, 1937
- Species: I. leipoxaides

Binomial name
- Isais leipoxaides Hering, 1937

Genus of moths

Isais is a monotypic moth genus in the family Lasiocampidae first described by Erich Martin Hering in 1937. Its single species, Isais leipoxaides, described by the same author in the same year, is found in what is now the Democratic Republic of the Congo.
