= Micropacha =

Scientific classification
- Kingdom: Animalia
- Phylum: Arthropoda
- Clade: Pancrustacea
- Class: Insecta
- Order: Lepidoptera
- Family: Lasiocampidae
- Genus: Micropacha; Roepke, 1953

Genus of moths

Micropacha is a genus of moths in the family Lasiocampidae. The genus was described by Roepke in 1953.

== Species ==
- Micropacha kalisi Roepke, 1953
- Micropacha roepkei Holloway, 1987
