= Eupagopteryx =

Scientific classification
- Kingdom: Animalia
- Phylum: Arthropoda
- Class: Insecta
- Order: Lepidoptera
- Family: Lasiocampidae
- Genus: Eupagopteryx de Lajonquière, 1972

Genus of moths

Eupagopteryx is a genus of moths in the family Lasiocampidae. The genus was first described by Yves de Lajonquière in 1972.

== Species ==
- Eupagopteryx affinis Aurivillius, 1909
- Eupagopteryx albolunatus Kenrick, 1914
- Eupagopteryx songeana Strand, 1913
