= Norapidia =

Scientific classification
- Kingdom: Animalia
- Phylum: Arthropoda
- Class: Insecta
- Order: Lepidoptera
- Family: Lasiocampidae
- Genus: Norapidia; Draudt, 1927

Genus of moths

Norapidia is a genus of moths in the family Lasiocampidae. The genus was erected by Max Wilhelm Karl Draudt in 1927.

== Species ==
- Norapidia divisata Dognin, 1917
- Norapidia subdelineata Dognin, 1917
