= Neoborocera =

Scientific classification
- Kingdom: Animalia
- Phylum: Arthropoda
- Class: Insecta
- Order: Lepidoptera
- Family: Lasiocampidae
- Genus: Neoborocera; Draudt, 1927
- Species: N. esteban

Binomial name
- Neoborocera esteban Dognin, 1892

Genus of moths

Neoborocera is a monotypic moth genus in the family Lasiocampidae erected by Max Wilhelm Karl Draudt in 1927. Its single species, Neoborocera esteban, was described by Paul Dognin in 1892. It is found in Ecuador.
