= Epicnapteroides =

Scientific classification
- Kingdom: Animalia
- Phylum: Arthropoda
- Class: Insecta
- Order: Lepidoptera
- Family: Lasiocampidae
- Genus: Epicnapteroides; Strand, 1912

Genus of moths

Epicnapteroides is a genus of moths in the family Lasiocampidae. The genus was erected by Strand in 1912.

== Species ==
- Epicnapteroides fuliginosa Pinhey, 1973
- Epicnapteroides lobata Strand, 1912
- Epicnapteroides marmorata Pinhey, 1973
