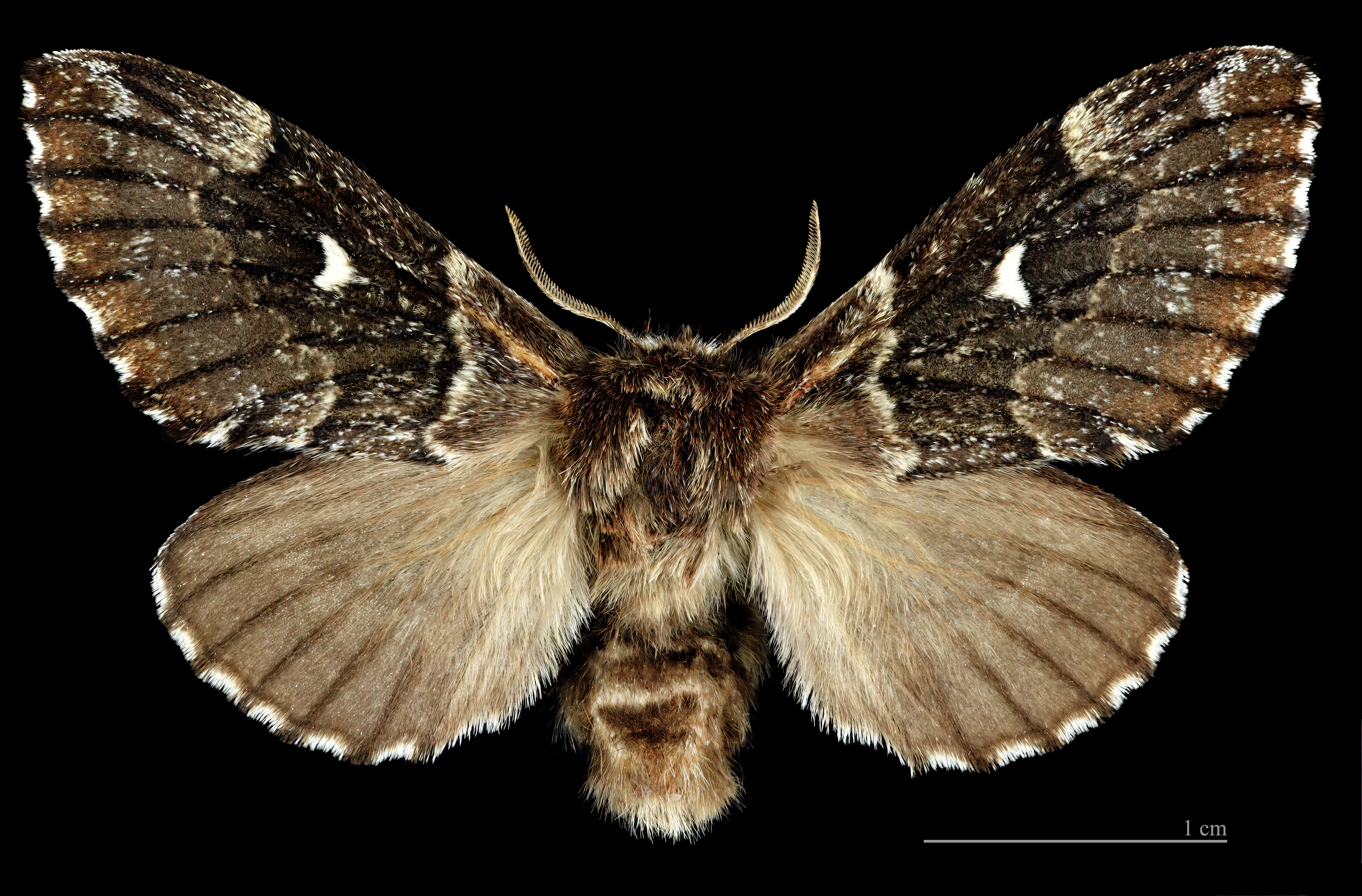

Scientific classification
- Kingdom: Animalia
- Phylum: Arthropoda
- Clade: Pancrustacea
- Class: Insecta
- Order: Lepidoptera
- Family: Lasiocampidae
- Genus: Cosmotriche; Hübner, 1820

Synonyms
- Selenephera Rambur, 1866; Kononia Matsumura, 1927; Selenepherides Daniel, 1953; Wilemaniella Matsumura, 1927

= Cosmotriche =

Genus of moths

Cosmotriche is a genus of moths in the family Lasiocampidae. The genus was erected by Jacob Hübner in 1820.

== Species ==
The genus consists of the following species:

- Cosmotriche lobulina Schiffermüller, 1775
- Cosmotriche discitincta Wileman, 1914
- Cosmotriche monotona Daniel, 1953
