= Tolytia =

Scientific classification
- Kingdom: Animalia
- Phylum: Arthropoda
- Clade: Pancrustacea
- Class: Insecta
- Order: Lepidoptera
- Family: Lasiocampidae
- Genus: Tolytia; Schaus, 1924

Genus of moths

Tolytia is a genus of moths in the family Lasiocampidae. The genus was erected by William Schaus in 1924.

== Species ==
- Tolytia multilinea Schaus, 1906
- Tolytia sana Dognin, 1916
- Tolytia sanguilenta Dognin, 1916
