= Metajana =

Scientific classification
- Kingdom: Animalia
- Phylum: Arthropoda
- Class: Insecta
- Order: Lepidoptera
- Family: Lasiocampidae
- Genus: Metajana; Holland, 1896

Genus of moths

Metajana is a genus of moths in the family Lasiocampidae. The genus was first described by William Jacob Holland in 1896.

== Species ==
- Metajana chanleri Holland, 1896
- Metajana hypolispa Tams, 1930
- Metajana marshalli (Aurivillius, 1909)
