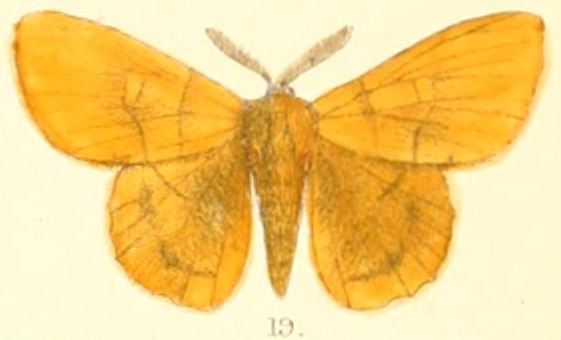

Scientific classification
- Kingdom: Animalia
- Phylum: Arthropoda
- Class: Insecta
- Order: Lepidoptera
- Family: Lasiocampidae
- Genus: Crinocraspeda; Hampson, 1893
- Species: C. torrida

Binomial name
- Crinocraspeda torrida (Moore, 1879)

Synonyms
- Gastropacha torrida Moore, 1879

= Crinocraspeda =

Genus of moths

Crinocraspeda is a monotypic moth genus in the family Lasiocampidae erected by George Hampson in 1893. Its only species, Crinocraspeda torrida, was described by Frederic Moore in 1879.

== Distribution ==
It is found in India, Myanmar, Nepal, southern China, northern Thailand, Laos and northern Vietnam.
