= Lamprantaugia =

Scientific classification
- Kingdom: Animalia
- Phylum: Arthropoda
- Class: Insecta
- Order: Lepidoptera
- Family: Lasiocampidae
- Genus: Lamprantaugia de Lajonquière, 1970

Genus of moths

Lamprantaugia is a genus of moths in the family Lasiocampidae. The genus was established by Yves de Lajonquière in 1970.

== Species ==
- Lamprantaugia gueneana Mabille, 1880
- Lamprantaugia tamatavae Guenée, 1865
