= Aurivillia =

Scientific classification
- Kingdom: Animalia
- Phylum: Arthropoda
- Class: Insecta
- Order: Lepidoptera
- Family: Lasiocampidae
- Genus: Aurivillia; Tutt, 1902

Genus of moths

Aurivillia is a genus of moths in the family Lasiocampidae described by Tutt in 1902.
