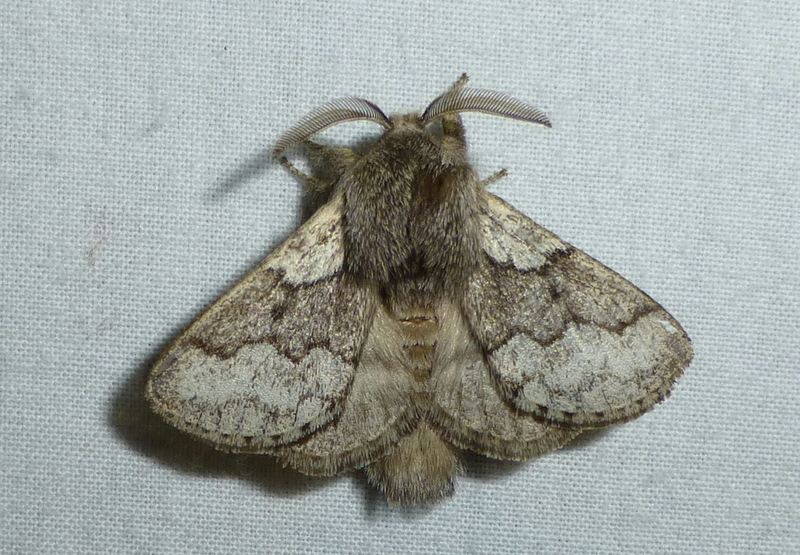
- Trichiura crataegi

Scientific classification
- Domain: Eukaryota
- Kingdom: Animalia
- Phylum: Arthropoda
- Class: Insecta
- Order: Lepidoptera
- Family: Lasiocampidae
- Genus: Trichiura; Stephens, 1828

Synonyms
- Acnocampa Rambur, 1858

= Trichiura =

Genus of moths

Trichiura is a genus of moths in the family Lasiocampidae. The genus was described by James Francis Stephens in 1928.

== Species ==
- Trichiura crataegi (Linnaeus, 1758) - pale oak eggar
- Trichiura castiliana (Spuler, 1908)
- Trichiura ilicis (Rambur, 1858)
- Trichiura mirzayani
- Trichiura verenae Witt, 1981
