= Pompeja =

Scientific classification
- Kingdom: Animalia
- Phylum: Arthropoda
- Clade: Pancrustacea
- Class: Insecta
- Order: Lepidoptera
- Family: Lasiocampidae
- Genus: Pompeja; Herrich-Schäffer, 1856
- Species: P. psorica

Binomial name
- Pompeja psorica Herrich-Schäffer, 1854

Synonyms
- Omphalia psorica Herrich-Schäffer, [1854]

Genus of moths

Pompeja is a monotypic genus of moth in the family Lasiocampidae erected by Gottlieb August Wilhelm Herrich-Schäffer in 1856. Its only species, Pompeja psorica, described by the same author two years earlier, is found in Brazil.
