= Acosmetoptera =

Scientific classification
- Kingdom: Animalia
- Phylum: Arthropoda
- Clade: Pancrustacea
- Class: Insecta
- Order: Lepidoptera
- Family: Lasiocampidae
- Genus: Acosmetoptera de Lajonquière, 1972

Genus of moths

Acosmetoptera is a genus of moths in the family Lasiocampidae. The genus was erected by Yves de Lajonquière in 1972.

== Species ==
- Acosmetoptera anacardia
- Acosmetoptera apicimacula (de Lajonquière, 1970)
- Acosmetoptera apimacula de Lajonquière, 1970
- Acosmetoptera ecpluta de Lajonquière, 1972
- Acosmetoptera nubenda de Lajonquière, 1972
- Acosmetoptera phela de Lajonquière, 1972
- Acosmetoptera raharizoninai de Lajonquière, 1970
