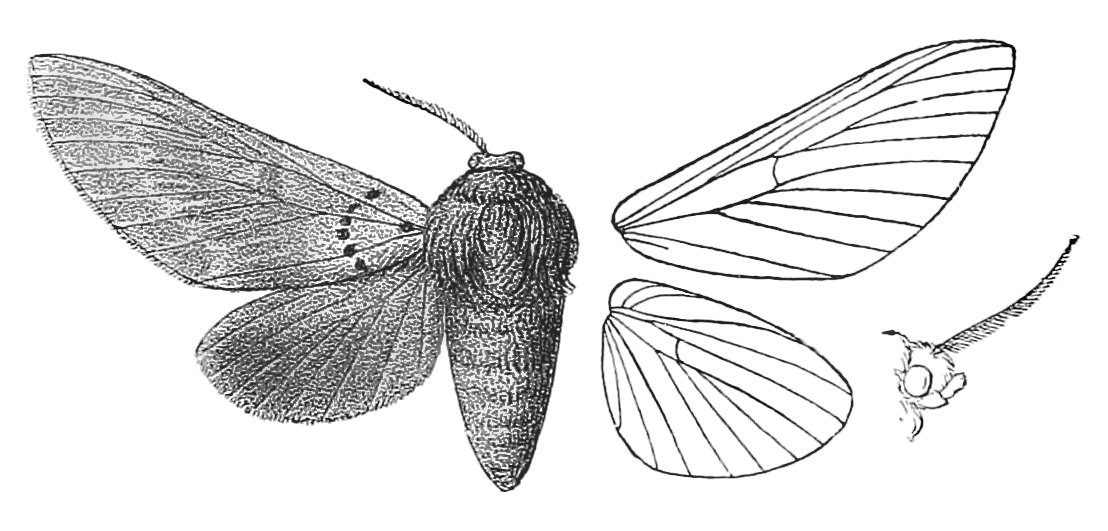
- Alompra ferruginea

Scientific classification
- Domain: Eukaryota
- Kingdom: Animalia
- Phylum: Arthropoda
- Class: Insecta
- Order: Lepidoptera
- Family: Lasiocampidae
- Genus: Alompra; Moore, 1872

= Alompra =

Genus of moths

Alompra is a genus of moths in the family Lasiocampidae. The genus was erected by Frederic Moore in 1872.

== Species ==
- Alompra bidiensis Tams, 1953
- Alompra cerastes Tams, 1953
- Alompra ferruginea Moore, 1872
- Alompra roepkei Tams, 1953
- Alompra yibinfani Wu, Lee & Zolotuhin, 2017
