= Trichiurana =

Scientific classification
- Kingdom: Animalia
- Phylum: Arthropoda
- Clade: Pancrustacea
- Class: Insecta
- Order: Lepidoptera
- Family: Lasiocampidae
- Genus: Trichiurana; Aurivillius, 1921
- Species: T. meridionalis

Binomial name
- Trichiurana meridionalis Aurivillius, 1921

Genus of moths

Trichiurana is a monotypic moth genus in the family Lasiocampidae erected by Per Olof Christopher Aurivillius in 1921. Its single species, Trichiurana meridionalis, described by the same author in the same year, is found in what is now South Africa.
