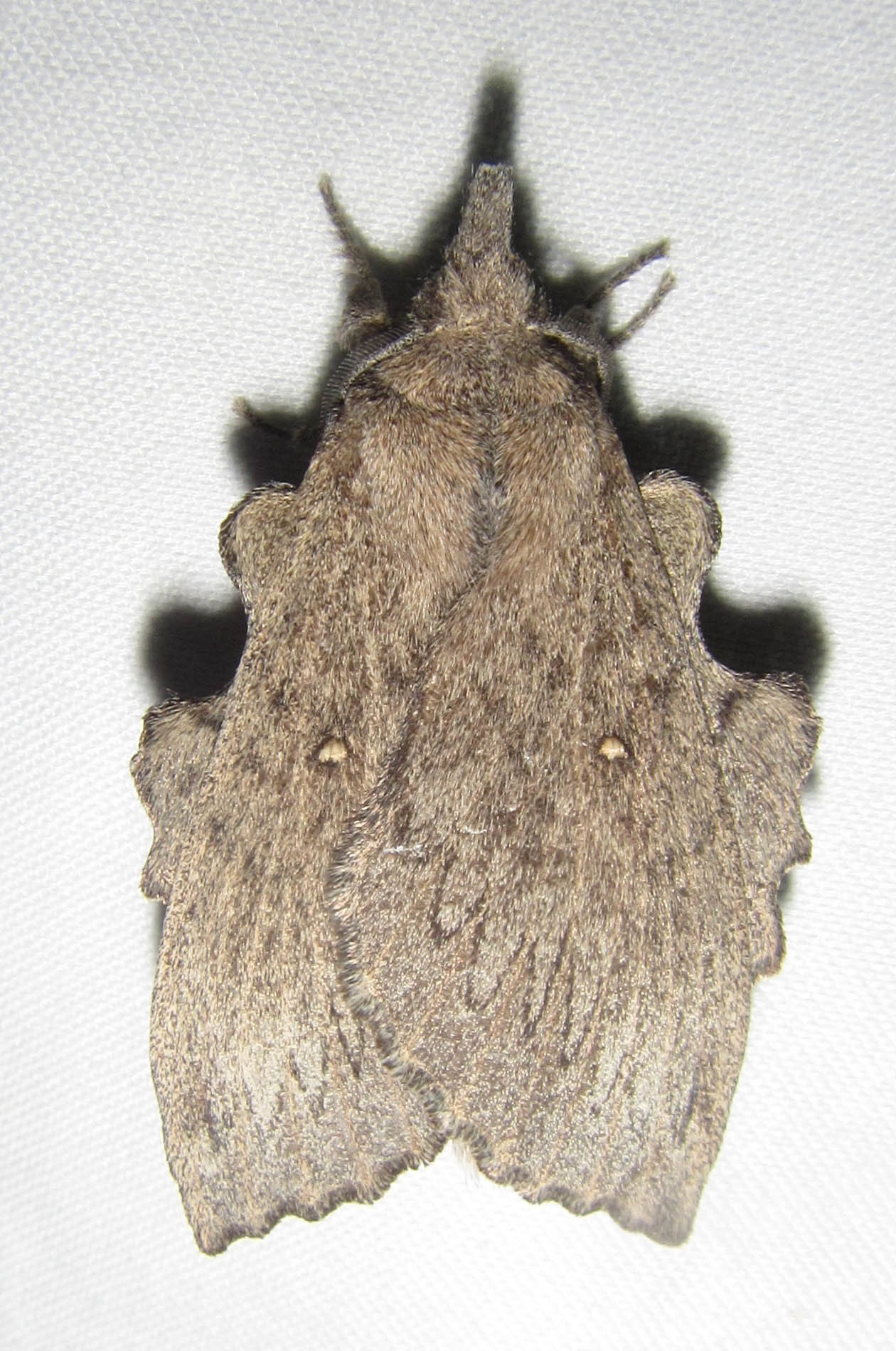

Scientific classification
- Kingdom: Animalia
- Phylum: Arthropoda
- Class: Insecta
- Order: Lepidoptera
- Family: Lasiocampidae
- Genus: Rhinobombyx; Aurivillius, 1879
- Species: R. cuneata

Binomial name
- Rhinobombyx cuneata Aurivillius, 1879

Synonyms
- Leipoxais ziczac Strand, 1912; Rhinobombyx ziczac (Strand, 1912)

= Rhinobombyx =

Genus of moths

Rhinobombyx is a monotypic moth genus in the family Lasiocampidae erected by Per Olof Christopher Aurivillius in 1879. Its single species, Rhinobombyx cuneata, described by the same author in the same year, is found in what is now Namibia, Zimbabwe, South Africa and in what was at the time of description German East Africa.
