= Amurilla =

Scientific classification
- Kingdom: Animalia
- Phylum: Arthropoda
- Class: Insecta
- Order: Lepidoptera
- Family: Lasiocampidae
- Genus: Amurilla; Aurivillius, 1902

Genus of moths

Amurilla is a genus of moths in the family Lasiocampidae. The genus was erected by Per Olof Christopher Aurivillius in 1902.
