= Craspia =

Scientific classification
- Kingdom: Animalia
- Phylum: Arthropoda
- Class: Insecta
- Order: Lepidoptera
- Family: Lasiocampidae
- Genus: Craspia; Aurivillius, 1909

Genus of moths

Craspia is a genus of moths in the family Lasiocampidae. The genus was erected by Per Olof Christopher Aurivillius in 1909.

== Species ==
- Craspia hypolispa Tams, 1930
- Craspia igneotincta Aurivillius, 1909
- Craspia kilwicola Strand, 1912
- Craspia marshalli Aurivillius, 1908
- Craspia rhypara Hering, 1928
- Craspia wahlbergi Aurivillius, 1909
- Craspia wellmanni Weymer, 1908
