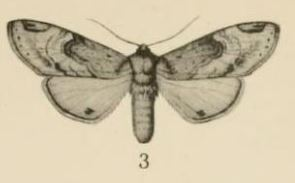

Scientific classification
- Kingdom: Animalia
- Phylum: Arthropoda
- Class: Insecta
- Order: Lepidoptera
- Family: Lasiocampidae
- Genus: Schausinna; Aurivillius, 1909

= Schausinna =

Genus of moths

Schausinna is a genus of moths in the family Lasiocampidae. The genus was erected by Per Olof Christopher Aurivillius in 1909.

== Species ==
Species of this genus are:

- Schausinna affinis Aurivillius, 1910
- Schausinna clementsi (Schaus, 1897)
- Schausinna regia (Grünberg, 1910)
