= Syrastrenoides =

Scientific classification
- Kingdom: Animalia
- Phylum: Arthropoda
- Clade: Pancrustacea
- Class: Insecta
- Order: Lepidoptera
- Family: Lasiocampidae
- Genus: Syrastrenoides; Matsumura, 1927
- Species: S. horishana

Binomial name
- Syrastrenoides horishana Matsumura, 1927

Genus of moths

Syrastrenoides is a monotypic moth genus in the family Lasiocampidae erected by Matsumura in 1927. Its single species, Syrastrenoides horishana, described by the same author in the same year, is found in Taiwan.
