= Chrysium =

Scientific classification
- Kingdom: Animalia
- Phylum: Arthropoda
- Class: Insecta
- Order: Lepidoptera
- Family: Lasiocampidae
- Genus: Chrysium de Lajonquière, 1969

Genus of moths

Chrysium is a monotypic moth genus in the family Lasiocampidae. The genus was erected by Yves de Lajonquière in 1969. Its single species, Chrysium mesembrinus, described by the same author in the same year, is found in Madagascar.
