= Notogroma =

Scientific classification
- Kingdom: Animalia
- Phylum: Arthropoda
- Clade: Pancrustacea
- Class: Insecta
- Order: Lepidoptera
- Family: Lasiocampidae
- Genus: Notogroma; Zolotuhin & Witt, 2000
- Species: N. mutabile

Binomial name
- Notogroma mutabile L. Candèze, 1927

Genus of moths

Notogroma is a monotypic moth genus in the family Lasiocampidae described by Vadim V. Zolotuhin and Thomas Joseph Witt in 2000. Its single species, Notogroma mutabile, described by L. Candèze in 1927, is found in Indochina.
