= Limacodilla =

Scientific classification
- Kingdom: Animalia
- Phylum: Arthropoda
- Class: Insecta
- Order: Lepidoptera
- Family: Lasiocampidae
- Genus: Limacodilla; Felder, 1874

Genus of moths

Limacodilla is a genus of moths in the family Lasiocampidae.
