= Malacostola =

Scientific classification
- Kingdom: Animalia
- Phylum: Arthropoda
- Class: Insecta
- Order: Lepidoptera
- Family: Lasiocampidae
- Genus: Malacostola de Lajonquière, 1970

Genus of moths

Malacostola is a genus of moths in the family Lasiocampidae. The genus was erected by Yves de Lajonquière in 1970.

== Species ==
- Malacostola mediodiluta de Lajonquière, 1972
- Malacostola mollis de Lajonquière, 1970
- Malacostola mutata de Lajonquière, 1970
- Malacostola psara de Lajonquière, 1972
- Malacostola serrata de Lajonquière, 1972
- Malacostola torrefacta de Lajonquière, 1972
