= Neurochyta =

Scientific classification
- Kingdom: Animalia
- Phylum: Arthropoda
- Class: Insecta
- Order: Lepidoptera
- Family: Lasiocampidae
- Genus: Neurochyta; Turner, 1918

Synonyms
- Eremanepsia Turner, 1936

Genus of moths

Neurochyta is a genus of moths in the family Lasiocampidae. The genus was first described by Turner in 1918.

== Species ==
Based on Lepidoptera and Some Other Life Forms:

- Neurochyta edna (Swinhoe, 1902) from Australia
- Neurochyta agrapta (Turner, 1936) Australia
