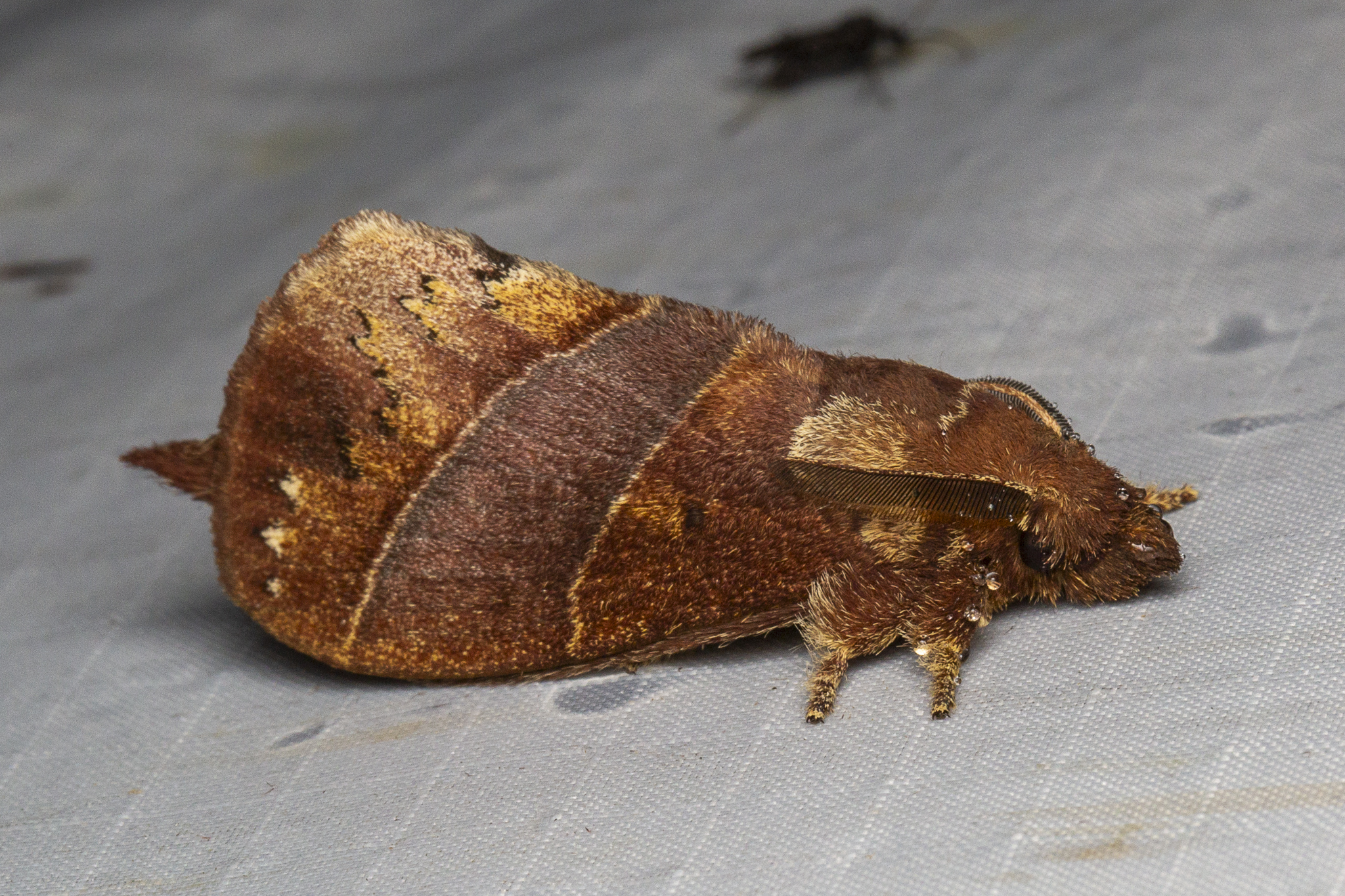
- Lajonquierea derunoides

Scientific classification
- Kingdom: Animalia
- Phylum: Arthropoda
- Clade: Pancrustacea
- Class: Insecta
- Order: Lepidoptera
- Family: Lasiocampidae
- Genus: Lajonquierea; Holloway, 1987

= Lajonquierea =

Genus of moths

Lajonquierea is a genus of moths in the family Lasiocampidae. The genus was erected by Holloway in 1987.

== Species ==
- Lajonquierea deruna Moore, 1859
- Lajonquierea derunoides Holloway, 1987
- Lajonquierea falcifer Holloway & Bender, 1990
- Lajonquierea jermyi Holloway, 1987
- Lajonquierea mediofasciata Grünberg, 1913
- Lajonquierea piccoloptera Holloway, 1987
- Lajonquierea poeciloptera Grünberg, 1913
- Lajonquierea variabile Holloway, 1987
