= Cosmeptera =

Scientific classification
- Kingdom: Animalia
- Phylum: Arthropoda
- Class: Insecta
- Order: Lepidoptera
- Family: Lasiocampidae
- Genus: Cosmeptera de Lajonquiere, 1979

Genus of moths

Cosmeptera is a genus of moths in the family Lasiocampidae. The genus was erected by Yves de Lajonquière in 1979.

== Species ==
- Cosmeptera hampsoni Leech, 1899
- Cosmeptera ornata de Lajonquière, 1979
- Cosmeptera pretiosa de Lajonquière, 1979
- Cosmeptera pulchra de Lajonquière, 1979
- Cosmeptera salvazai de Lajonquière, 1979
