= Libanopacha =

Scientific classification
- Kingdom: Animalia
- Phylum: Arthropoda
- Class: Insecta
- Order: Lepidoptera
- Family: Lasiocampidae
- Genus: Libanopacha; Zerny, 1933
- Species: L. schwingenschussi

Binomial name
- Libanopacha schwingenschussi Zerny, 1933

Genus of moths

Libanopacha is a monotypic moth genus in the family Lasiocampidae erected by Zerny in 1933. Its single species, Libanopacha schwingenschussi, was described by the same author in the same year.
