= Lerodes =

Scientific classification
- Kingdom: Animalia
- Phylum: Arthropoda
- Clade: Pancrustacea
- Class: Insecta
- Order: Lepidoptera
- Family: Lasiocampidae
- Genus: Lerodes; Saalmüller, 1884
- Species: L. fulgurita

Binomial name
- Lerodes fulgurita Saalmüller, 1880

Genus of moths

Lerodes is a monotypic moth genus in the family Lasiocampidae erected by Saalmüller in 1884. Its single species, Lerodes fulgurita, was described by the same author four years earlier. It is found in Madagascar.
