= Titya =

- Titya rivulosa

Scientific classification
- Kingdom: Animalia
- Phylum: Arthropoda
- Clade: Pancrustacea
- Class: Insecta
- Order: Lepidoptera
- Family: Lasiocampidae
- Genus: Titya; Walker, 1855

Genus of moths

Titya is a genus of moths in the family Lasiocampidae. The genus was erected by Francis Walker in 1855.

== Species ==
The following species are recognised in the genus Titya:

- Titya abstersa Felder, C. & Felder, R., 1874
- Titya alma (Weymer, 1895)
- Titya angala Schaus, 1924
- Titya angustipennis (Schaus, 1905)
- Titya arpiana Schaus, 1924
- Titya avita Schaus, 1924
- Titya bella (Druce, 1887)
- Titya cain Schaus, 1936
- Titya cinerascens (Schaus, 1905)
- Titya fraternans Schaus, 1936
- Titya fumida Schaus, 1892
- Titya gracilis (Dognin, 1923)
- Titya guthagon Schaus, 1924
- Titya hirta (Stoll, 1782)
- Titya infernalis (Schaus, 1890)
- Titya intercalaris (Draudt, 1927)
- Titya jamaicensis (Schaus, 1906)
- Titya lusciosa Dognin, 1912
- Titya maura Draudt, 1927
- Titya melini Bryk, 1953
- Titya mexicana (Walker, 1862)
- Titya nigrescens (Druce, 1906)
- Titya noctilux Walker, 1855
- Titya opalina (Walker, 1865)
- Titya pallida (Dognin, 1923)
- Titya proxima Burmeister, 1878
- Titya rivulosa (Butler, 1878)
- Titya sublucana Draudt, 1927
- Titya synoecura (Dyar, 1914)
- Titya trilinea Dognin, 1901
- Titya vitrea Dognin, 1901
- BOLD:AAA2537
- BOLD:AAA2567
- BOLD:AAB0769
- BOLD:AAH5706
- BOLD:AAM8439
- BOLD:AAM9168
- BOLD:AAU3731
- BOLD:ACA1466
- BOLD:ACG1700
- BOLD:ACM3783
- BOLD:ADG3108
- BOLD:ADR5415
- BOLD:ADZ2763
- BOLD:AEF6992
- BOLD:AEL1953
