= Apotolype =

Scientific classification
- Kingdom: Animalia
- Phylum: Arthropoda
- Class: Insecta
- Order: Lepidoptera
- Family: Lasiocampidae
- Genus: Apotolype; Franclemont, 1973

Genus of moths

Apotolype is a genus of moths in the family Lasiocampidae. The genus was erected by John G. Franclemont in 1973. It is found in southwestern North America.

== Species ==
Based on Lepidoptera and Some Other Life Forms:

- Apotolype brevicrista (Dyar, 1895) Texas, Arizona, Mexico
- Apotolype blanchardi Franclemont, 1973 Texas
