= Mesera =

Scientific classification
- Kingdom: Animalia
- Phylum: Arthropoda
- Class: Insecta
- Order: Lepidoptera
- Family: Lasiocampidae
- Genus: Mesera; Walker, 1855

Genus of moths

Mesera is a genus of moths in the family Lasiocampidae. The genus was erected by Francis Walker in 1855.

== Species ==
- Mesera arpi Schaus, 1896
- Mesera crassipuncta Draudt, 1927
- Mesera rimicola Draudt, 1927
- Mesera tristis Walker, 1855
