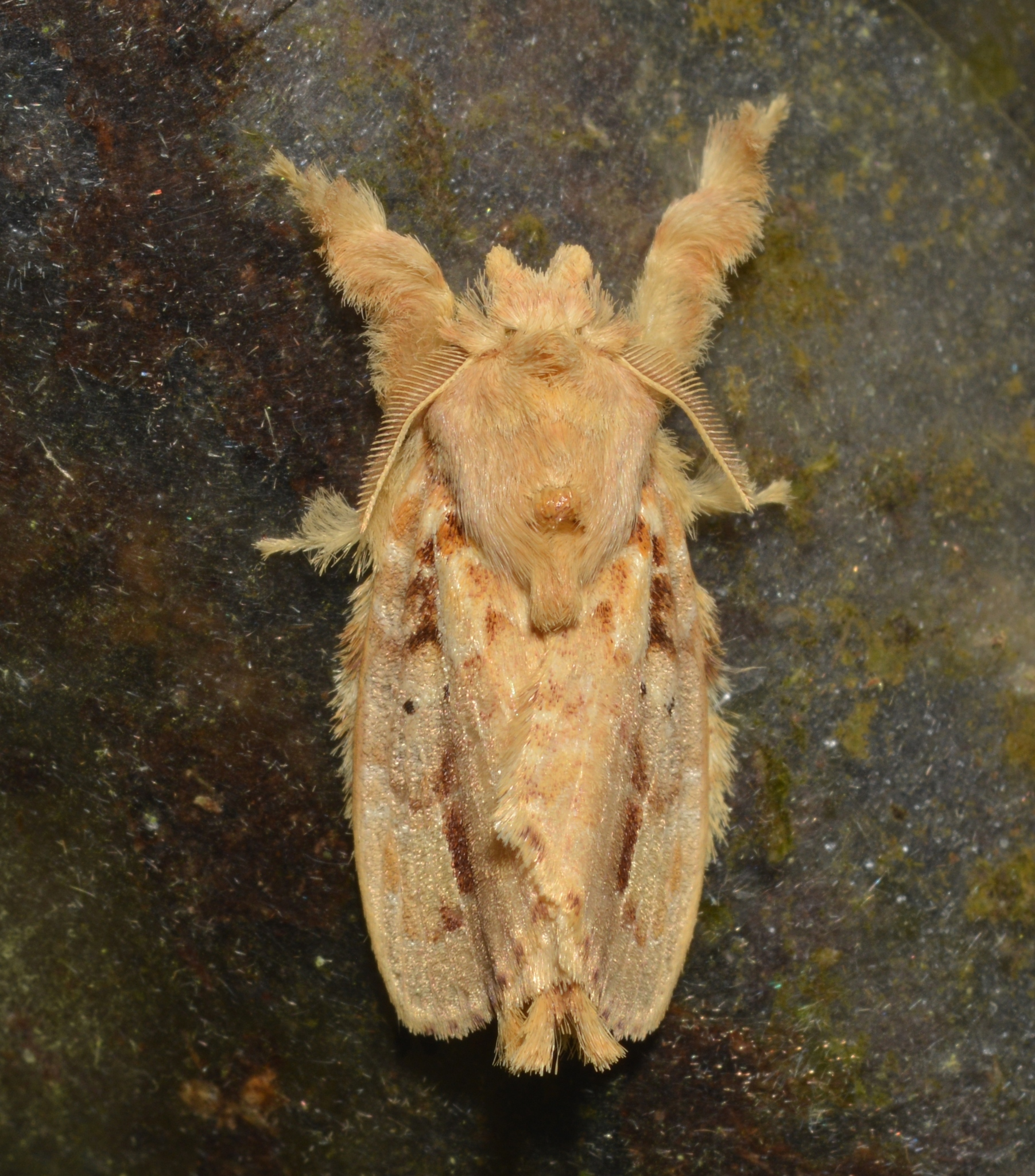
- Nesara casada in Costa Rica

Scientific classification
- Kingdom: Animalia
- Phylum: Arthropoda
- Clade: Pancrustacea
- Class: Insecta
- Order: Lepidoptera
- Family: Lasiocampidae
- Subfamily: Poecilocampinae
- Tribe: Macromphaliini
- Genus: Nesara; Walker, 1855

= Nesara =

Genus of moths

Nesara is a genus of moths in the family Lasiocampidae. The genus was erected by Francis Walker in 1855.

== List of species ==
- Nesara apicalis (Walker, 1855)
- Nesara albida Walker, 1855
- Nesara caramina (Schaus, 1911)
- Nesara casada (Schaus, 1911)
- Nesara dacasa (Dognin, 1912)
- Nesara dalceroides (Schaus, 1905)
- Nesara drucei (Schaus, 1896)
- Nesara famata (Schaus, 1894)
- Nesara filamentosa (Dognin, 1923)
- Nesara francesca (Schaus, 1910)
- Nesara fumicosta (Draudt, 1928)
- Nesara gorgas (Schaus, 1915)
- Nesara lasthenia (Druce, 1887)
- Nesara lauda (Druce, 1887)
- Nesara laurina (Dognin, 1912)
- Nesara laxta (Druce, 1890)
- Nesara lemoulti (Schaus, 1905)
- Nesara macerra (Schaus, 1890)
- Nesara majorina (Dognin, 1916)
- Nesara mita (Schaus, 1905)
- Nesara niveipunctata (Dognin, 1923)
- Nesara ocruma (Schaus, 1905)
- Nesara oroyana (Dognin, 1923)
- Nesara pallida (Butler, 1878)
- Nesara parva (Dognin, 1912)
- Nesara plagiata (Walker, 1855)
- Nesara plicistriga (Draudt, 1928)
- Nesara poecila (Draudt, 1928)
- Nesara robustior (Draudt, 1928)
- Nesara tremula (Schaus, 1905)
- Nesara turpis (Butler, 1878)
