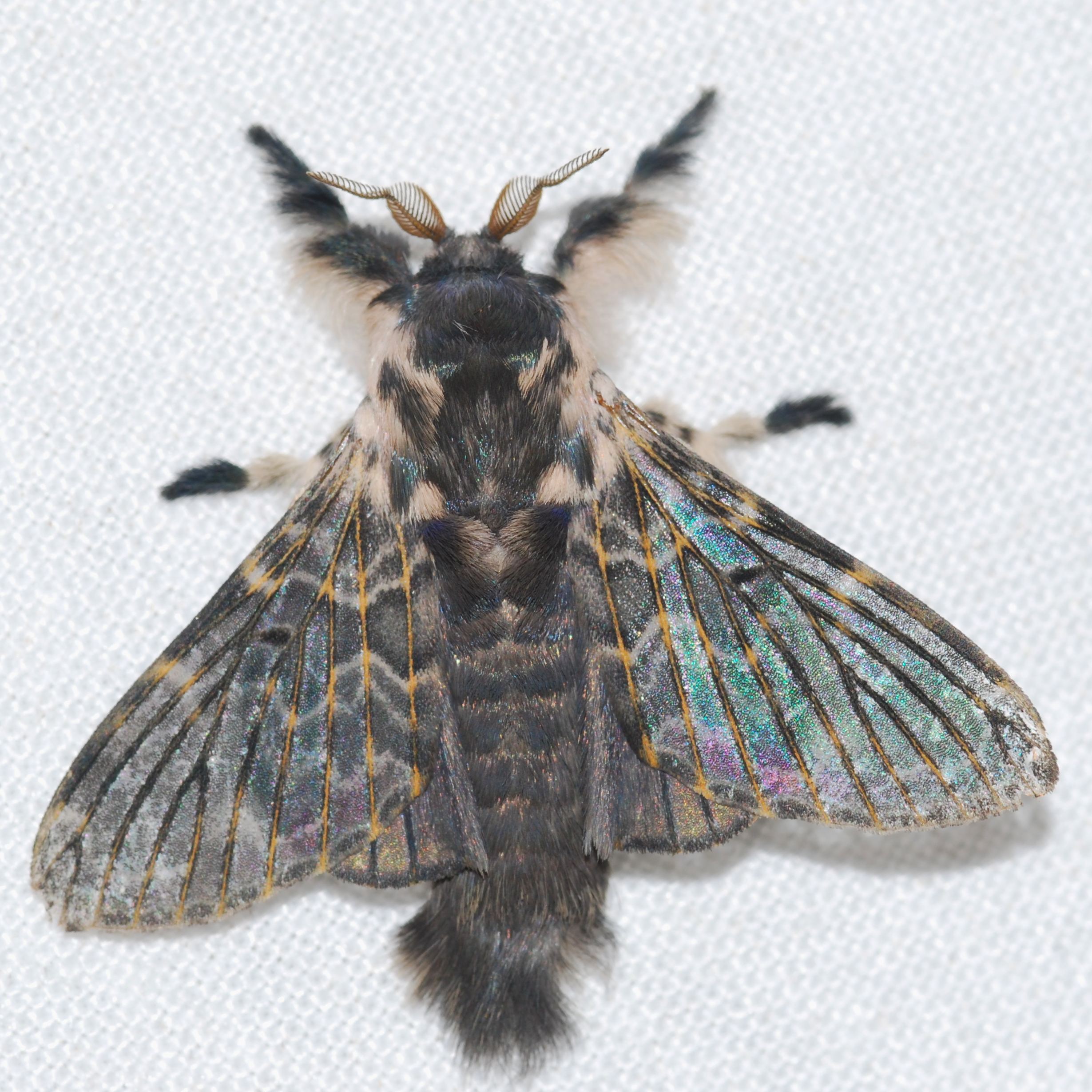
- Labedera primitiva

Scientific classification
- Kingdom: Animalia
- Phylum: Arthropoda
- Class: Insecta
- Order: Lepidoptera
- Family: Lasiocampidae
- Genus: Labedera; Walker, 1855

Synonyms
- Echedorus Herrich-Schäffer, [1856]; Phaedria Walker, 1855

= Labedera =

Genus of moths

Labedera is a genus of moths in the family Lasiocampidae. The genus was erected by Francis Walker in 1855.

== Species ==
- Labedera alma (Weymer, 1895)
- Labedera angala Schaus, 1924
- Labedera angustipennis Schaus, 1906
- Labedera argentata
- Labedera arpiana Schaus, 1924
- Labedera avita Schaus, 1924
- Labedera bella (Druce, 1887) Panama
- Labedera butleri
- Labedera cain Schaus, 1936
- Labedera cervina
- Labedera cinerascens Walker, 1856
- Labedera everildis
- Labedera fraternans Schaus, 1936
- Labedera fumida Schaus, 1892
- Labedera fuscicaudata Schaus, 1913
- Labedera gracilis Dognin, 1923
- Labedera guthagon Schaus, 1924
- Labedera hirta Stoll, 1782
- Labedera hirtipes Walker, 1855
- Labedera infernalis Schaus, 1890
- Labedera jamaicensis Schaus, 1906
- Labedera levana
- Labedera lusciosa Dognin, 1912
- Labedera manoba
- Labedera maura Draudt, 1927
- Labedera melini Bryk, 1953
- Labedera mexicanus (Herrich-Schäffer, [1856]) Mexico
- Labedera moderata (Walker, 1855) Brazil
- Labedera nigra
- Labedera nigrescens Druce, 1906
- Labedera nigricolor
- Labedera noctilux Walker, 1855
- Labedera opalina Walker, 1865
- Labedera pallida Dognin, 1923
- Labedera plurilinea
- Labedera primitiva Walker, 1855
- Labedera proxima Burmeister, 1878
- Labedera rivulosa Butler, 1878
- Labedera romani
- Labedera sublucana Draudt, 1927
- Labedera synoecura Dyar, 1914
- Labedera taruda
- Labedera trilinea Dognin, 1901
- Labedera vitgreus Dognin, 1901
