= Berthold Neumoegen =

American entomologist (1845–1895)

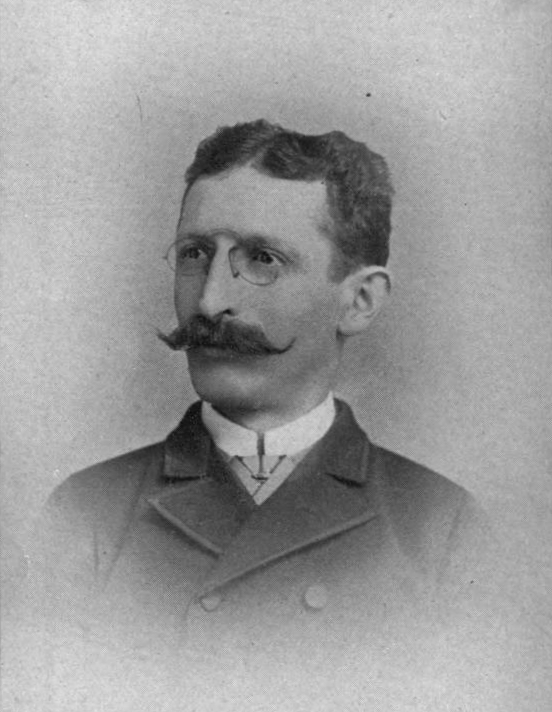

Berthold Neumoegen (November 19, 1845 – January 21, 1895) was a German-born American stock-market investor and amateur entomologist who specialized in the Lepidoptera.

Neumoegen (German orthography: Neumögen) was born in Frankfurt-am-Main where he was educated and known for his fluency in six languages. He became a member of the New York Stock Exchange from May 29, 1879, and was a broker and banker at M. Neumoegen Co., 40 Exchange Place. He collected butterflies and moths from around 1874 and collaborated with entomologists like Harrison Dyar and Herman Strecker. He employed Jacob Doll to curate his private collections and to make collection on trips. He died from a long drawn tuberculosis infection (consumption). His collections were donated to the Brooklyn Museum and then transferred to the US National Collection.

A species of hesperiid, Agathymus neumoegeni was named after him by Henry Edwards in 1882.
