= Tytocha =

Scientific classification
- Kingdom: Animalia
- Phylum: Arthropoda
- Class: Insecta
- Order: Lepidoptera
- Family: Lasiocampidae
- Genus: Tytocha; Schaus, 1924

Genus of moths

Tytocha is a genus of moths in the family Lasiocampidae. The genus was first described by William Schaus in 1924.

== Species ==
- Tytocha crassilinea Dognin, 1923
- Tytocha lineata Dognin, 1923
