= Macromphalia =

Scientific classification
- Kingdom: Animalia
- Phylum: Arthropoda
- Class: Insecta
- Order: Lepidoptera
- Family: Lasiocampidae
- Genus: Macromphalia; C. & R. Felder, 1874

Genus of moths

Macromphalia is a genus of moths in the family Lasiocampidae. The genus was erected by father and son entomologists Cajetan and Rudolf Felder in 1874.

== Species ==
- Macromphalia affinis Feisthamel, 1839
- Macromphalia ancilla Philippi, 1859
- Macromphalia canescens
- Macromphalia catharina Dognin, 1912
- Macromphalia chilensis Felder, 1874
- Macromphalia dedecora Feisthamel, 1839
- Macromphalia deficiens
- Macromphalia felispardalis Ureta, 1957
- Macromphalia hypoleuca Philippi, 1859
- Macromphalia lojanensis Dognin, 1891
- Macromphalia nigrofasciata Ureta, 1957
- Macromphalia nitida Butler, 1882
- Macromphalia oehrensi Ureta, 1957
- Macromphalia purissima Butler, 1882
- Macromphalia quindiensis
- Macromphalia rivularis Butler, 1882
- Macromphalia rubiginea Ureta, 1957
- Macromphalia rubrogrisea Philippi, 1863
- Macromphalia rufa
- Macromphalia rustica Philippi, 1863
- Macromphalia spadix Draudt, 1927
- Macromphalia valdiviensis Dognin, 1912
