= Igreja de Santa Maria =

Igreja de Santa Maria may refer to:

- Gereja Santa Perawan Maria Ratu (Jakarta), a church in Indonesia
- Igreja de Santa Maria (Loures), a church in Portugal
- Igreja de Santa Maria (Serpa), a church in Portugal
- Igreja de Santa Maria (Sintra), a church in Portugal
