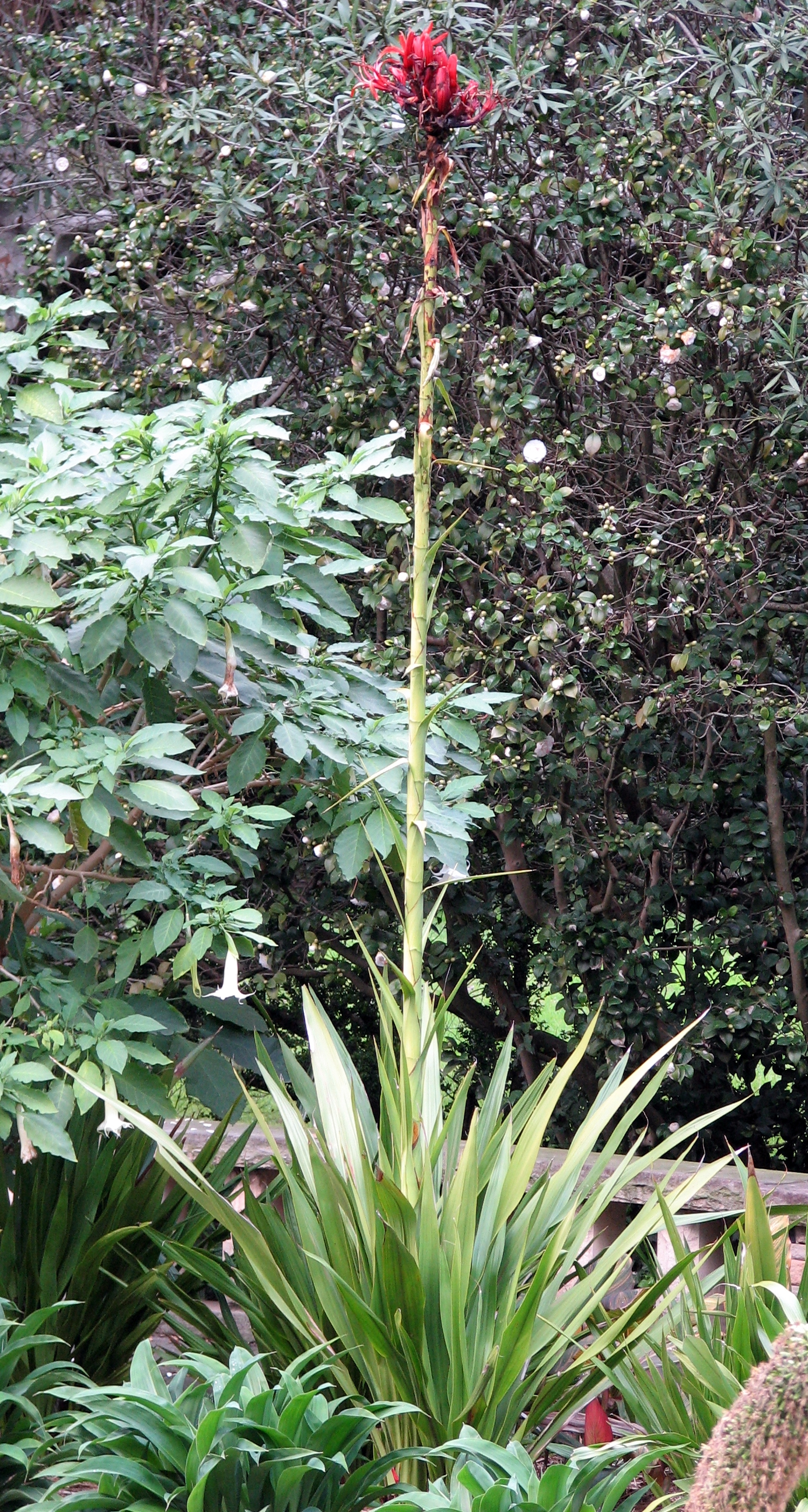
- Gymea lily in the Royal Botanic Gardens, Sydney

Scientific classification
- Kingdom: Plantae
- Clade: Tracheophytes
- Clade: Angiosperms
- Clade: Monocots
- Order: Asparagales
- Family: Doryanthaceae
- Genus: Doryanthes
- Species: D. excelsa

Binomial name
- Doryanthes excelsa Correa

Synonyms
- Doryanthes excelsa Correa var. excelsa; Furcraea australis Haw.

= Doryanthes excelsa =

Gymea lily

Species of flowering plant

Doryanthes excelsa, commonly known as the gymea lily, is a flowering plant in the family Doryanthaceae that is endemic to coastal areas of New South Wales near Sydney. It has sword-like leaves more than 1 metre (3 ft) long and it grows a flower spike up to 6 metres (20 ft) high. The apex of the spike bears a large cluster of bright red flowers, each 10 centimetres (4 in) across. Its common name is derived from kai'mia (anglicised as Gymea) in the indigenous Dharawal language. The Sydney suburbs of Gymea and Gymea Bay are named after the lily.

== Description ==
Gymea lilies have a rosette of large numbers of sword-shaped, strap like leaves 1–2.5 metres (3–8 ft) long and 10 centimetres (4 in) wide. The leaves are bright green, fibrous and glabrous.

In winter the flower spike grows from the centre of the rosette until it is up to 6 metres (20 ft) high, bearing shorter leaves up to 30 centimetres (10 in) long. At the top of the spike, a head of flowers 30 centimetres (10 in) in diameter develops, each flower being bright red, trumpet-shaped and about 10 centimetres (4 in) long. The head is surrounded by reddish-brown bracts, sometimes making it difficult to see the flowers from the ground. Flowering occurs in spring and is followed by oval-shaped reddish-brown capsules, 7–10 centimetres (3–4 in) long. In late summer, the capsule splits open and releases the seeds which are 15–23 millimetres (0.6–0.9 in) long. The flowers are pollinated by bees and nectar-feeding birds.

== Taxonomy and naming ==
Doryanthes excelsa was first formally described in 1802 by the Portuguese polymath, José Correia da Serra from the type specimen collected by George Bass "in mountainous parts of the colony of N.S.W.". The description was published in Transactions of the Linnean Society of London. The genus name (Doryanthes) is derived from the Ancient Greek δόρυ (dóry) meaning a "spear" and ἄνθος (ánthos) meaning "a flower". The specific epithet (excelsa) is a Latin word meaning "high", "lofty" or "distinguished". Doryanthes excelsa and Doryanthes palmeri are the only two members of the family Doryanthaceae.

"Doryanthes" has inspired the naming of the journal of history and heritage for Southern Sydney founded by Dharawal historian Les Bursill.

== Habitat ==
Doryanthes excelsa requires very specific conditions in order to flourish. It requires low-nutrient, acidic soils with a pH of about 4.1 that are moderately deep, sandy, and earthy. It grows specifically on slopes that face south or southeast, along creeks, gullies or sheltered plateaus and ridges, at elevations of 100–200 metres above sea level. The plant grows in open dry sclerophyll forests which also have Angophora costata, Eucalyptus piperita, E. gummifera, E. sieberi, or E. punctata, as well as in habitats with Xanthorrhoea, Telopea, and moisture-preferring groundcover plant species.

== Distribution ==
Doryanthes excelsa has a discontinuous distribution along the coast of New South Wales. It is found in Corindi (north of Coffs Harbour) in the north, and in areas surrounding Newcastle (including Awaba) down to Wollongong in the south. It is not found directly east or west of urbanized areas of Sydney. Specific areas where it is found include Newfoundland State Forest, Kremnos Creek (located just north of Glenreagh), Karuah, Nelson Bay, Somersby, Calga, Lucas Heights, Heathcote National Park, Darkes Forest, Dharug National Park, and Royal National Park. The isolated northernmost populations located north of Coffs Harbour are the most genetically divergent.

== Uses ==
=== Indigenous use ===
Aboriginal people roasted the young stems of gymea lily for eating. They also roasted the roots to make a kind of cake. Fibres from the leaves were used for making brushes and matting.

=== Horticulture ===
Gymea lilies are hardy and adaptable plants often used in landscape gardening, not only in the Sydney region but also in other coastal areas such as Brisbane and Perth. Plants can be grown from seed but may not flower for up to eight years. Flowering can be encouraged by fire and by carefully placing a stone in the centre of the rosette.

== Image gallery ==
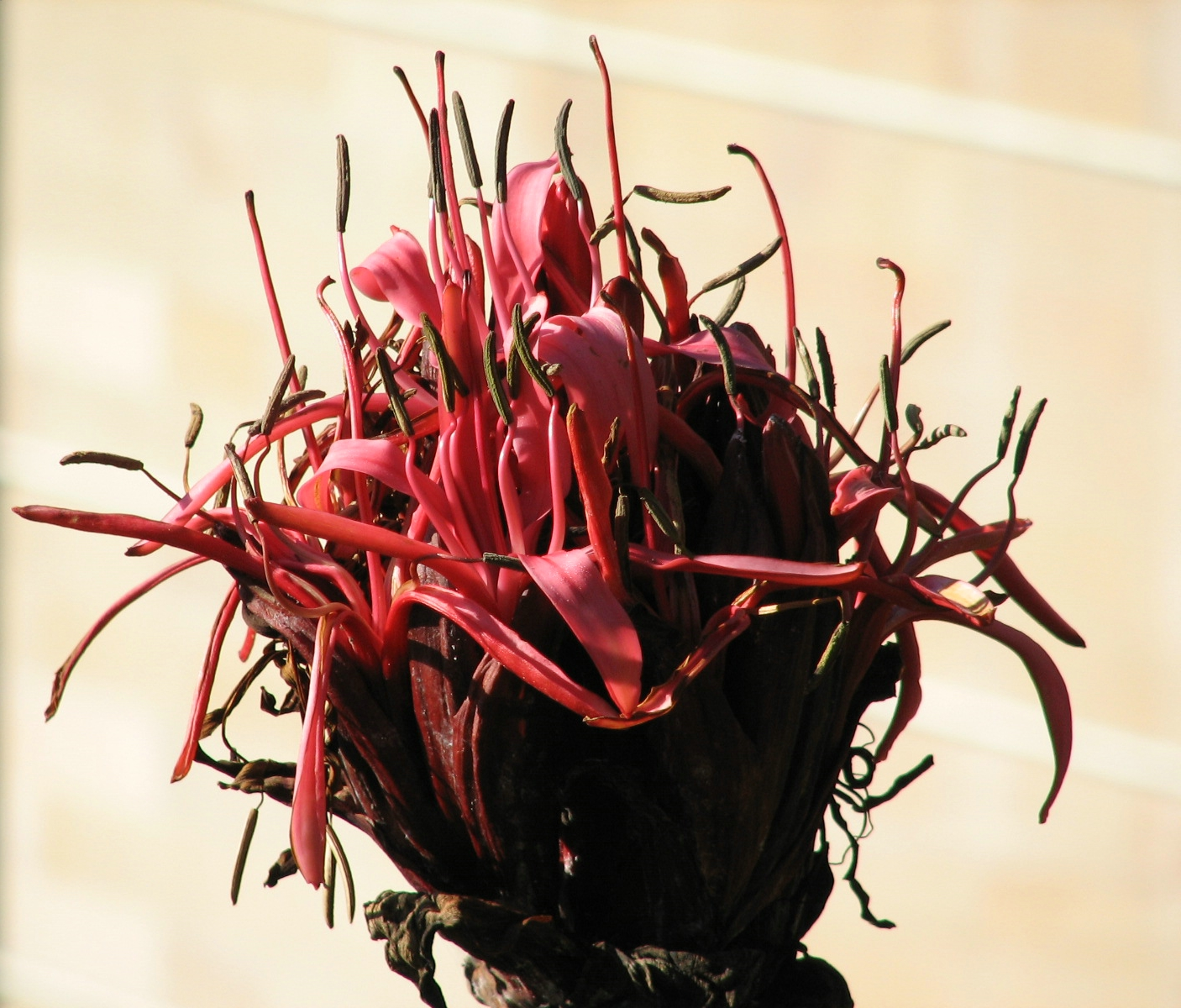
Flowers

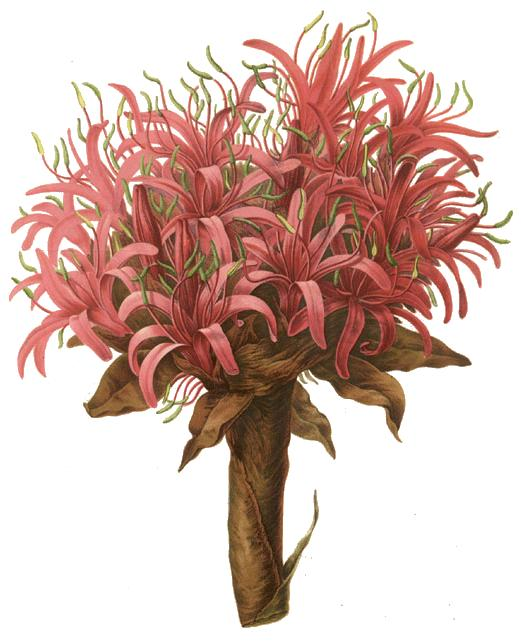
Flowers

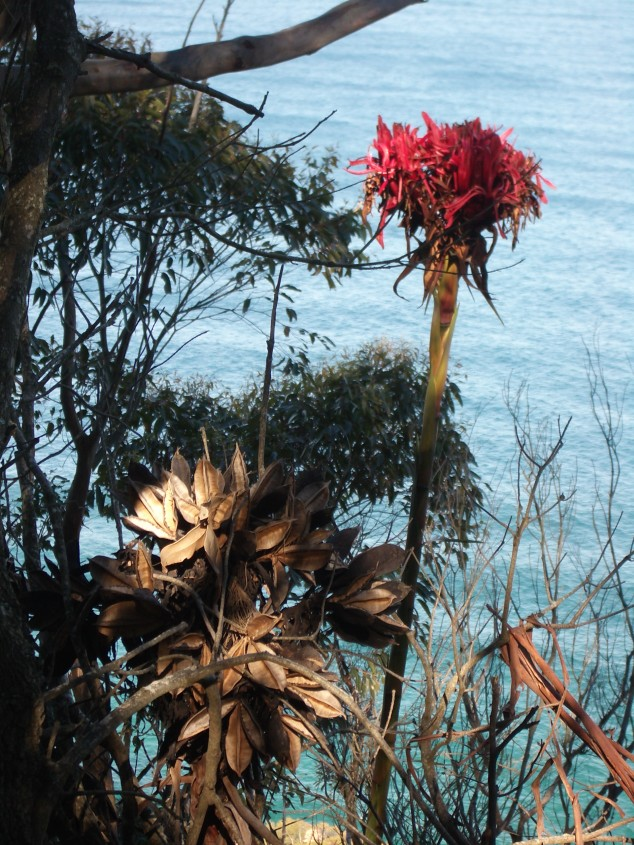
Flowers and past seeds

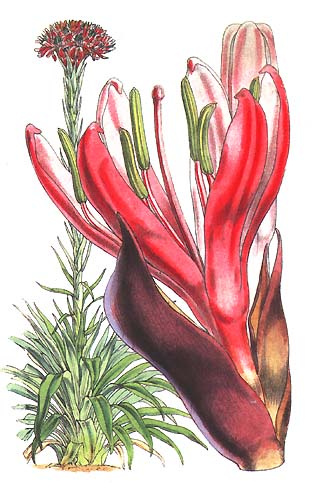
Illustration

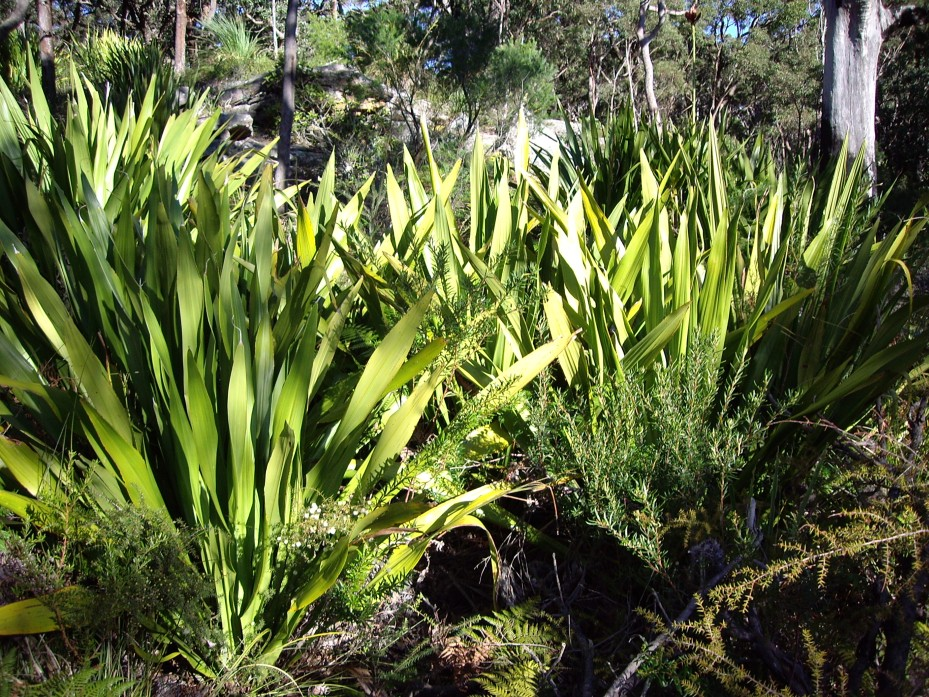
Sword-like leaves

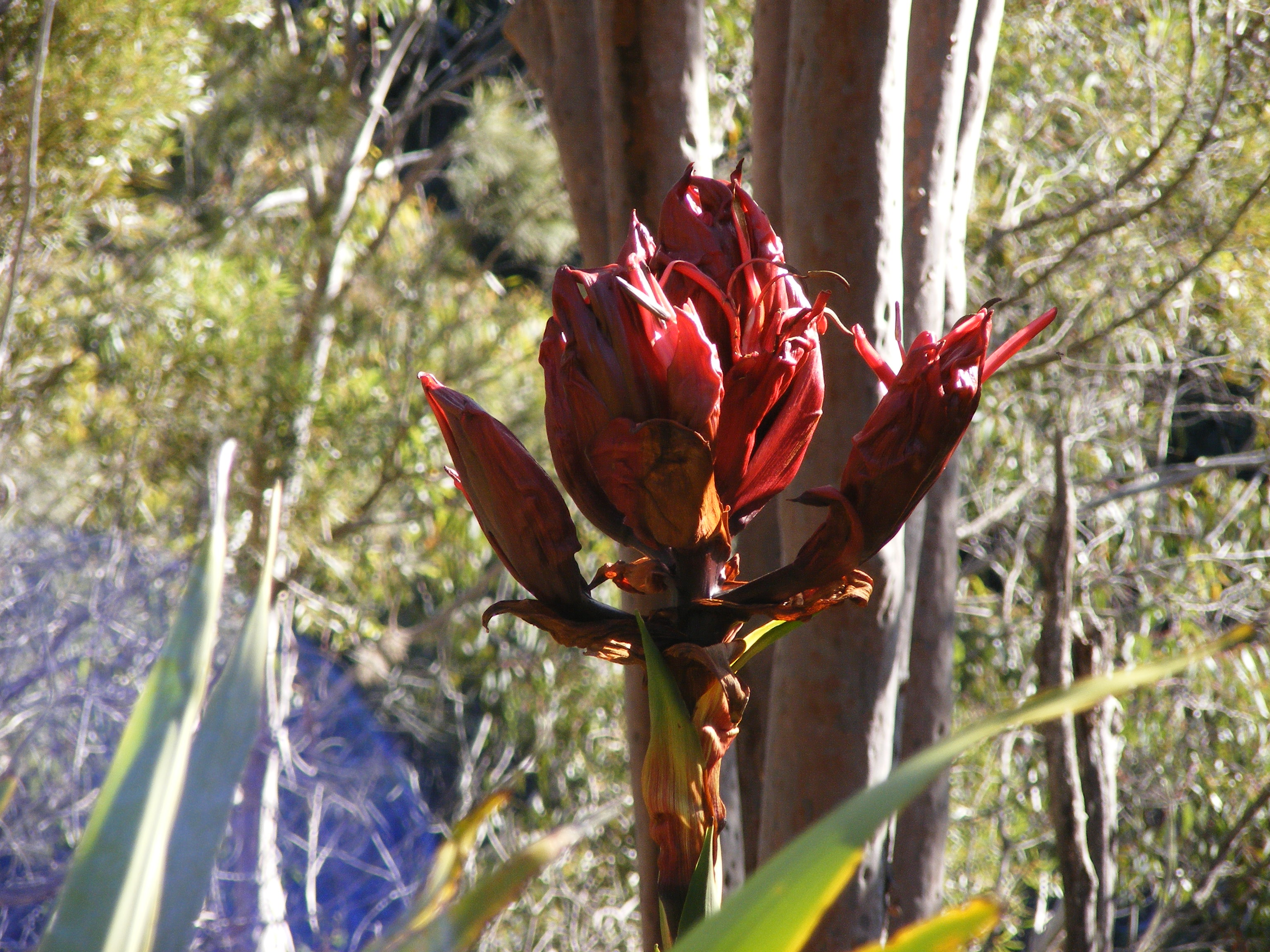
Doryanthes excelsa growing in natural habitat in Heathcote National Park, Sydney

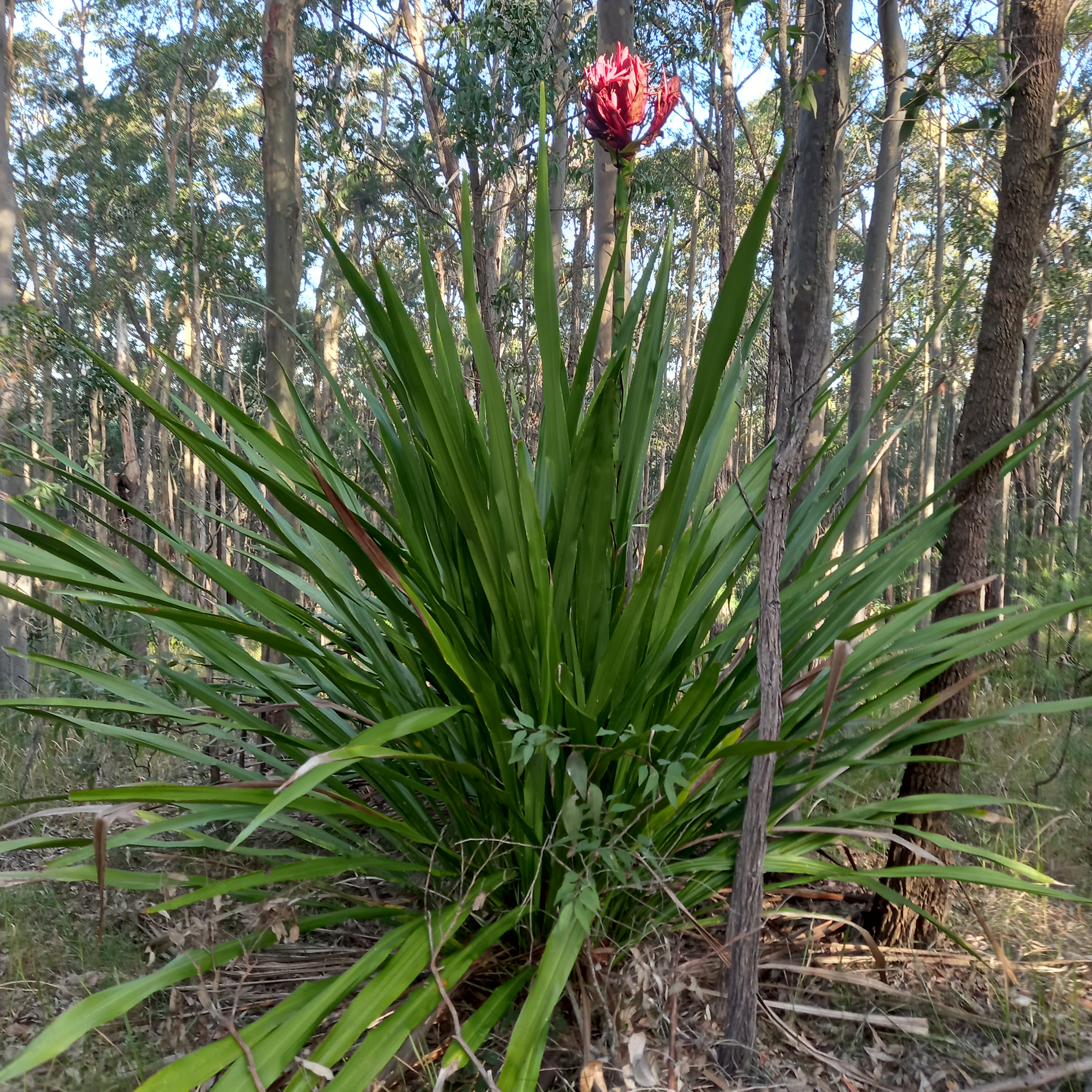
Doryanthes excelsa growing in natural habitat in Awaba, New South Wales

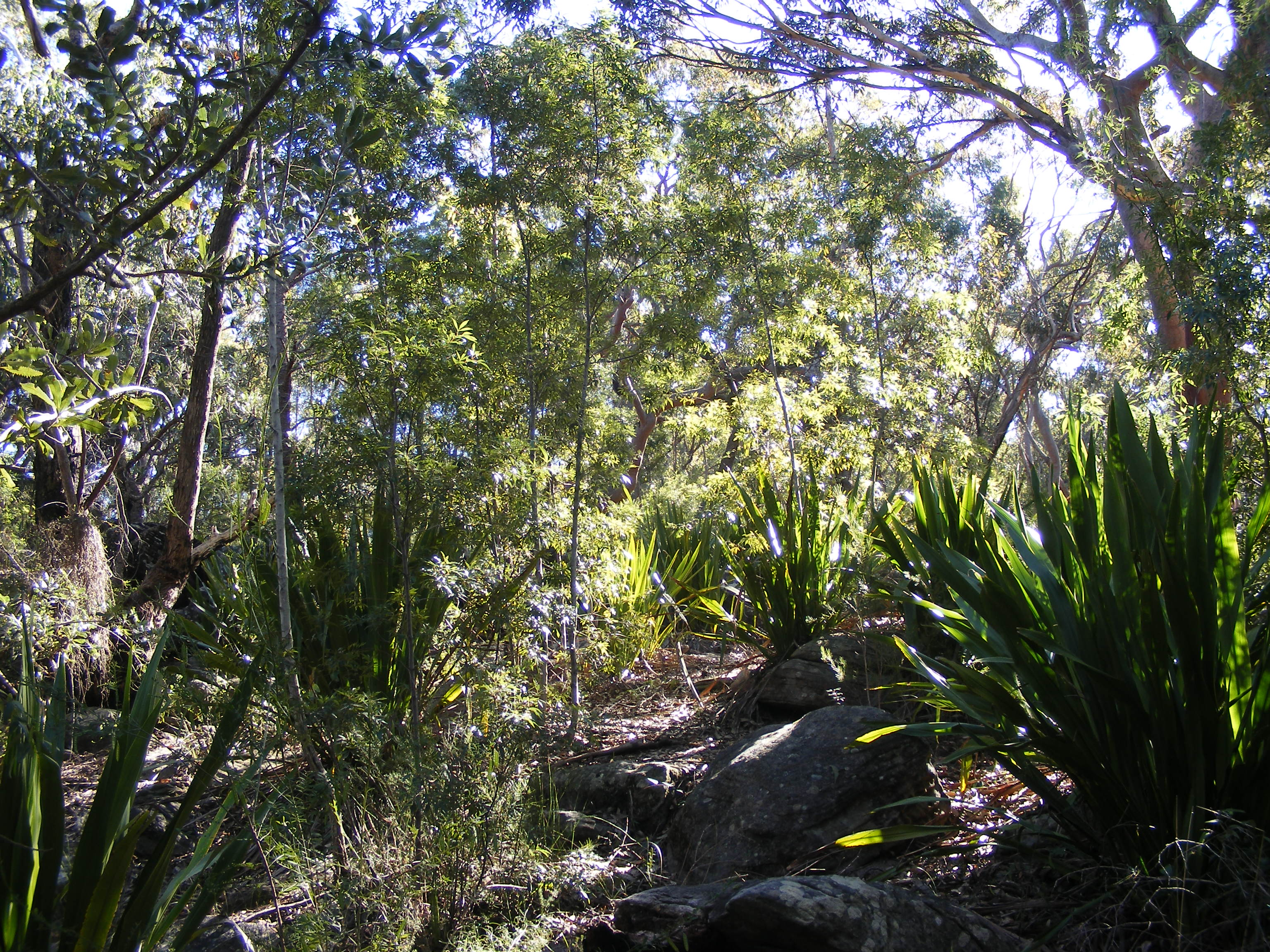
Habit

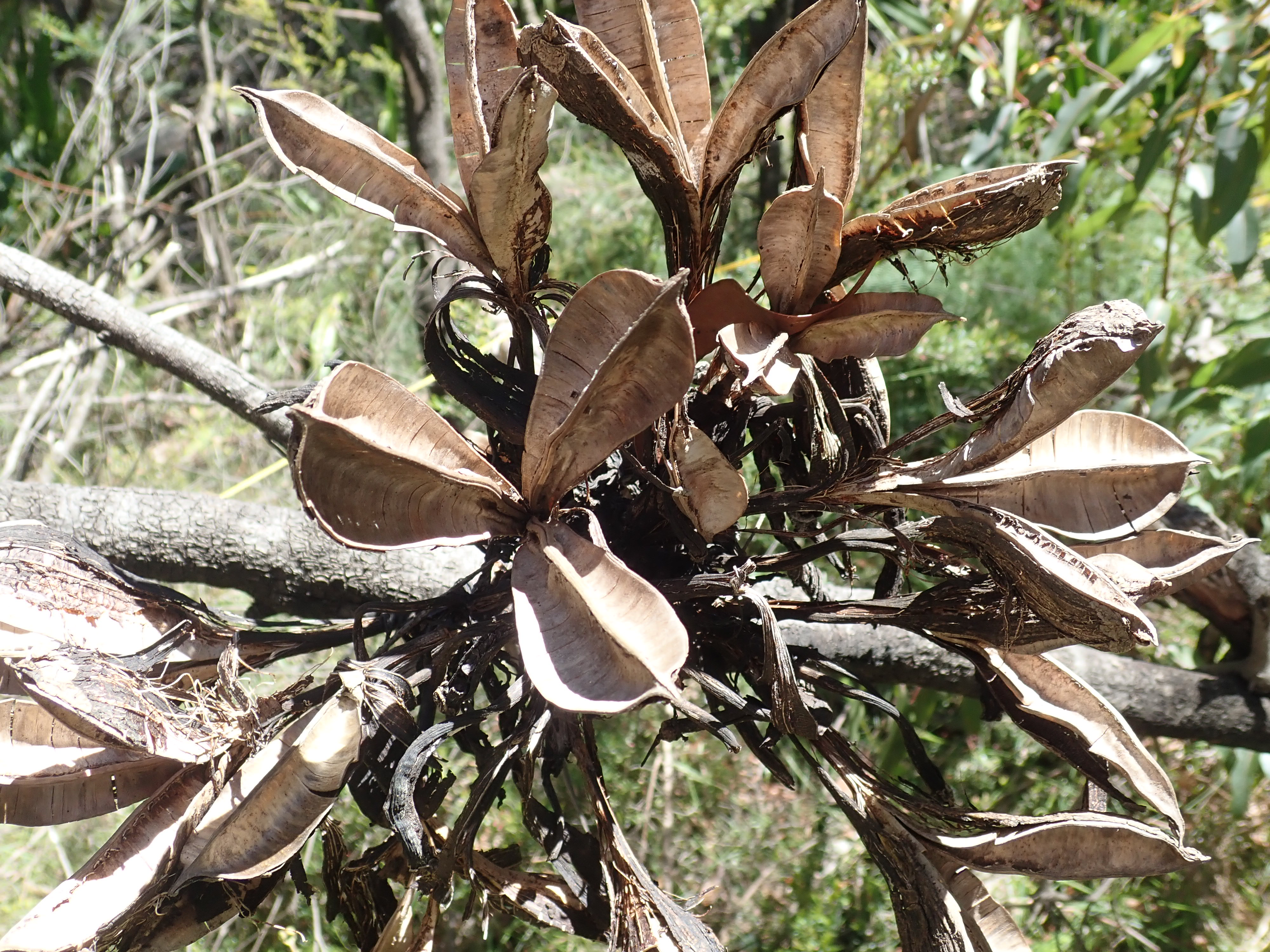
Seed head

== See also ==
- List of plants known as lily
