= Jorge de Melo =

Portuguese nobleman

Jorge de Melo, o Lagio
- Rico-Homen
- Born: 15th Century; Serpa, Portugal
- Died: 16th Century; Morocco?
- Noble family: Mello

Jorge de Melo, o Lagio (1460-1534) was a Portuguese nobleman, Alcaide mor of Redondo and Pavía. member of the Court of John III of Portugal.

== Biography ==
His parents were Martim Afonso de Mello (son of João de Melo), and Leonor Barreto daughter of Gonçalo Nunes Barreto and Isabel Pereira. Jorge de Melo was married to Branca Coutinho, daughter of Vasco Fernandes Coutinho (great grandson of Gonçalo Vasques) and Maria de Lima (daughter of Leonel de Lima and Filipa da Cunha).
