= Vila Nova de São Bento =

- Civil parish
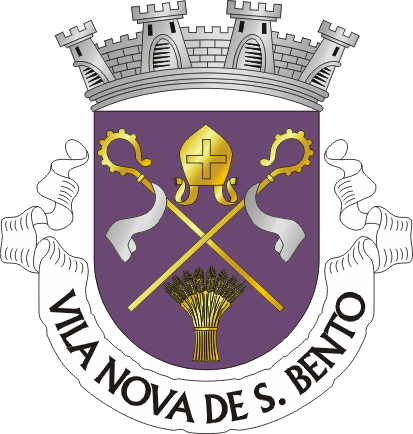
- Coat of arms

- Location in Portugal
- Coordinates: 37.927°N 7.411°W
- Country: Portugal
- Region: Alentejo
- District: Beja
- Municipality: Serpa
- Disbanded: 2013

Area
  - Total: 241.69 km^{2} (93.32 sq mi)

Population (2001)
  - Total: 3,430
  - Density: 14.2/km^{2} (36.8/sq mi)
- Time zone: UTC+00:00 (WET)
  - Summer (DST): UTC+01:00 (WEST)

Vila Nova de São Bento is a former civil parish in the municipality of Serpa, Portugal. In 2013, the parish merged into the new parish Vila Nova de São Bento e Vale de Vargo. It covers an area of 241.69 square kilometers and had 3,430 inhabitants in 2001.

It became a town on April 19, 1988, and until then, was called Aldeia Nova de São Bento. Its patron saint is St. Benedict and its annual festival alternates between the months of May and September.

== Notable people ==
- Filipe La Féria
- Manuel Monge
- Monge da Silva
- Dinarte Branco
