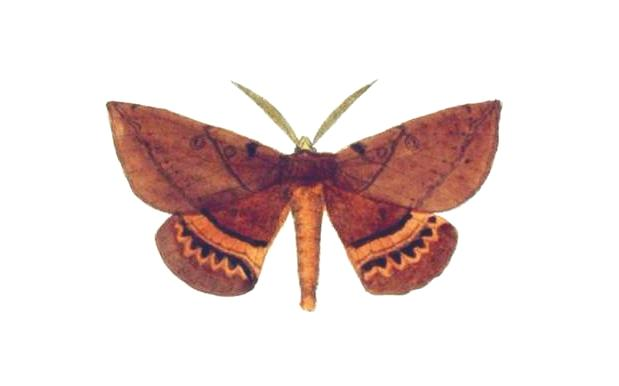
- Drawing by Alois Rogenhofer (1831-1897)

Scientific classification
- Kingdom: Animalia
- Phylum: Arthropoda
- Clade: Pancrustacea
- Class: Insecta
- Order: Lepidoptera
- Family: Anthelidae
- Genus: Chelepteryx
- Species: C. chalepteryx

Binomial name
- Chelepteryx chalepteryx (R. Felder, 1874)

Synonyms
- Darala chalepteryx Felder, & Rogenhofer, 1874; Chalepterix kochii Koch, 1872; Darala cupreotincta Lucas, 1892; Darala chelepteryx Lower, 1893; Chelepteryx felderi Turner, 1904

= Chelepteryx chalepteryx =

Species of moth

Chelepteryx chalepteryx, the white-stemmed wattle moth or white-stemmed acacia moth, is a moth of the family Anthelidae. The species was first described by Rudolf Felder in 1874. It is found in Australia.

The wingspan of reaches up to 10 cm. Males have a more intense colouration. The caterpillars of this species feed mainly on wattles and gymea lilies.

== Distribution ==
It is seen mainly in eastern Australia, including Queensland, New South Wales and Victoria, as well as Lord Howe Island.

== See also ==
- List of moths of Australia
