= Manuel Monge =

Manuel Monge may refer to:

- Manuel Monge Municipality, a municipality in the state of Yaracuy, Venezuela
- Manuel Monge (military figure), Portuguese military figure
