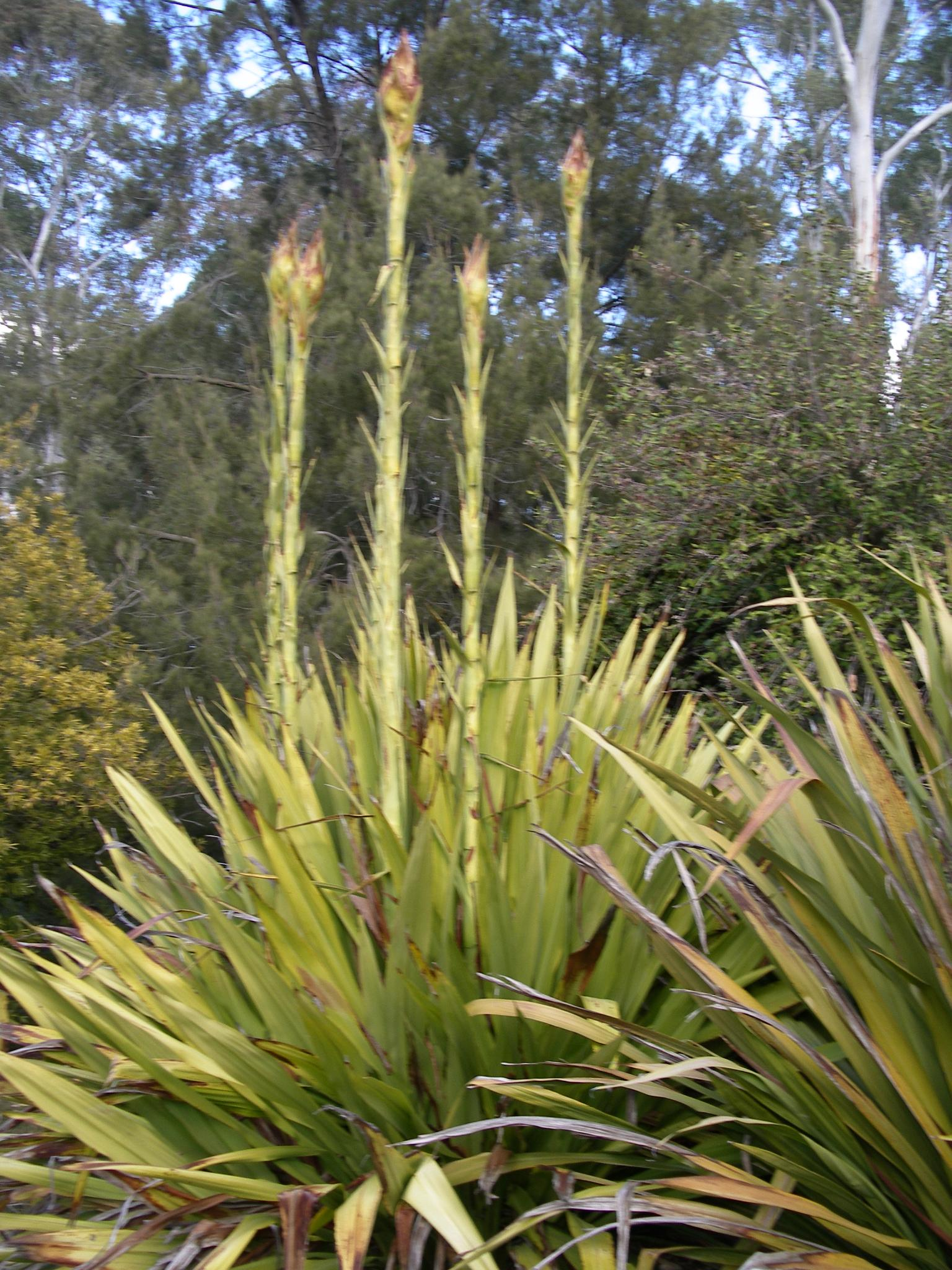
- Doryanthes excelsa

Scientific classification
- Kingdom: Plantae
- Clade: Tracheophytes
- Clade: Angiosperms
- Clade: Monocots
- Order: Asparagales
- Family: Doryanthaceae; R.Dahlgren & Clifford
- Genus: Doryanthes; Corrêa

Species
- Doryanthes excelsa Corrêa; Doryanthes palmeri W.Hill ex Benth.

= Doryanthes =

Genus of flowering plants

Doryanthes is the sole genus in the flowering plant family Doryanthaceae. The genus consists of two species, D. excelsa (gymea lily) and D. palmeri (giant spear lily), both endemic natives of the coast of Eastern Australia. Doryanthaceae is part of the order Asparagales (the asparagoid lilies).

Plants grow in a rosette form, only flowering after more than 10 years. They enjoy a warm environment, good soil, and much water during the warmest time of the year.

== Systematics ==
The genus Doryanthes was first described in 1802 by the Portuguese priest, statesman, philosopher and botanist José Francisco Corrêa da Serra (1751–1823), a close friend of Joseph Banks. D. excelsa or gymea lily, which is endemic to southern Sydney and the Illawarra, inspired the naming of Doryanthes, the journal of history and heritage for Southern Sydney founded by Dharawal historian Les Bursill.

The family Doryanthaceae, placed in the order Asparagales of the monocots, has only recently been recognized by taxonomists. Formerly the genus was usually placed in the family Agavaceae, now the subfamily Agavoideae of the family Asparagaceae.
