= Bursill =

Bursill is a surname. Notable people with the surname include:

- Les Bursill (1945–2019), Australian historian, archaeologist, anthropologist, and historian
- Tina Bursill (born 1951), Australian actress
