= João de Melo =

Portuguese nobleman

- Born: 1405; Beja, Portugal
- Died: 1486 (aged 80–81); Serpa, Portugal

João de Melo (1405-1486) was a Portuguese nobleman, alcaide-mor of Serpa, and copeiro-mor (Master of the Ceremonies) of Afonso V of Portugal.

== Biography ==
João was born in Portugal, the son of Martim Afonso de Melo and Briolanja de Sousa. His wife was Isabel da Silveira daughter of Nuno Martins da Silveira and Leonor Falcão.
