= Igreja de Santa Maria (Serpa) =

Church in Serpa, Beja District, Portugal

Coordinates: 37.945116°N 7.5989263°W

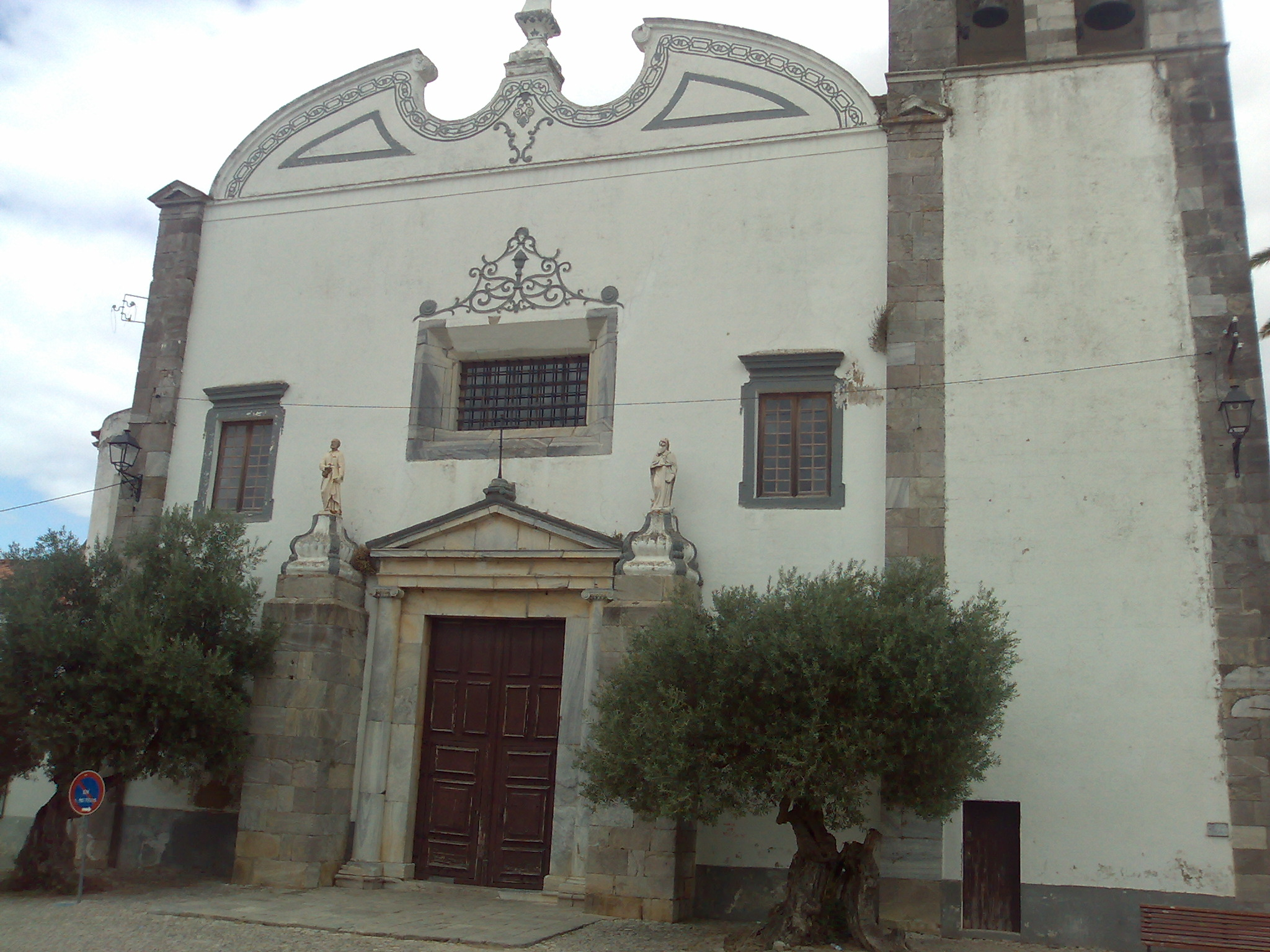
Igreja de Santa Maria

Igreja de Santa Maria is a 14th-century church in Serpa, Alentejo, Portugal. It is classified as a National Monument.

== History ==
Igreja de Santa Maria is believed to be built over a former Arab mosque site. Indications for this remains. These include the bell tower built apart from church body and remains of a cylindrical base on the site. Santa Maria was also a name usually given to converted mosques.
