= Serpa solar power plant =

Construction

Serpa Solar Power Plant
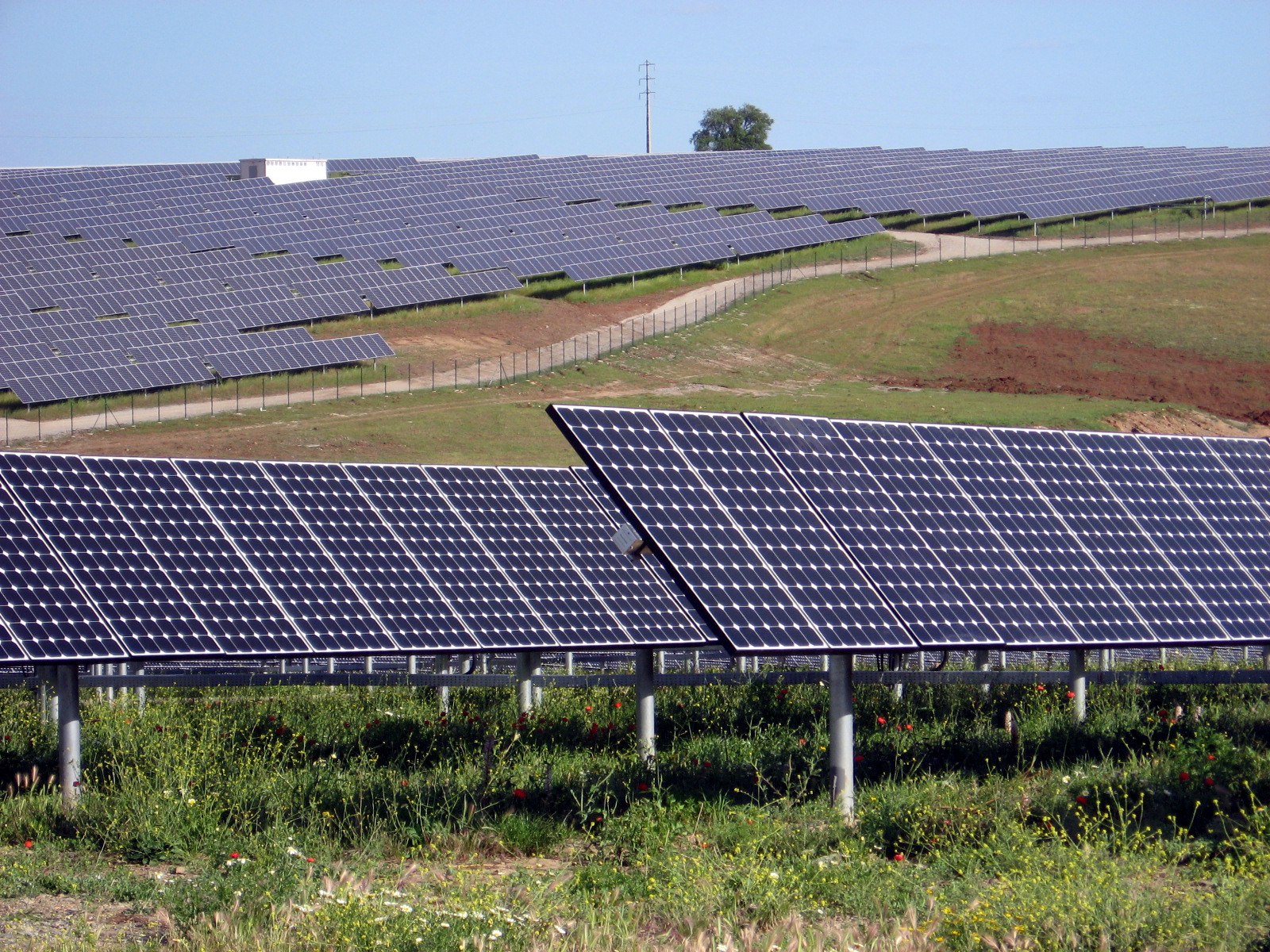
- Serpa solar power plant panels
- Country: Portugal
- Location: Serpa
- Coordinates: 38°01′51″N 7°37′22″W
- Status: Operational
- Construction began: May 2006
- Commission date: 28 March 2007
- Construction cost: €62 million

Solar farm
- Type: Flat-panel PV
- Site area: 84 acres (34 ha)

Power generation
- Units operational: 52,300
- Nameplate capacity: 11 MW

The Serpa solar power plant (also known as Hércules solar power plant) cost 58 million euro. It opened during 2007 in Serpa, Portugal.

The Serpa solar power plant was developed by the Portuguese company Catavento. General Electric Financial Services provided the financing for the project as part of its Ecomagination program.

== See also ==
- Renewable energy in Portugal
- Renewable energy in the European Union
- Energy policy of the European Union
- Renewable energy commercialization
