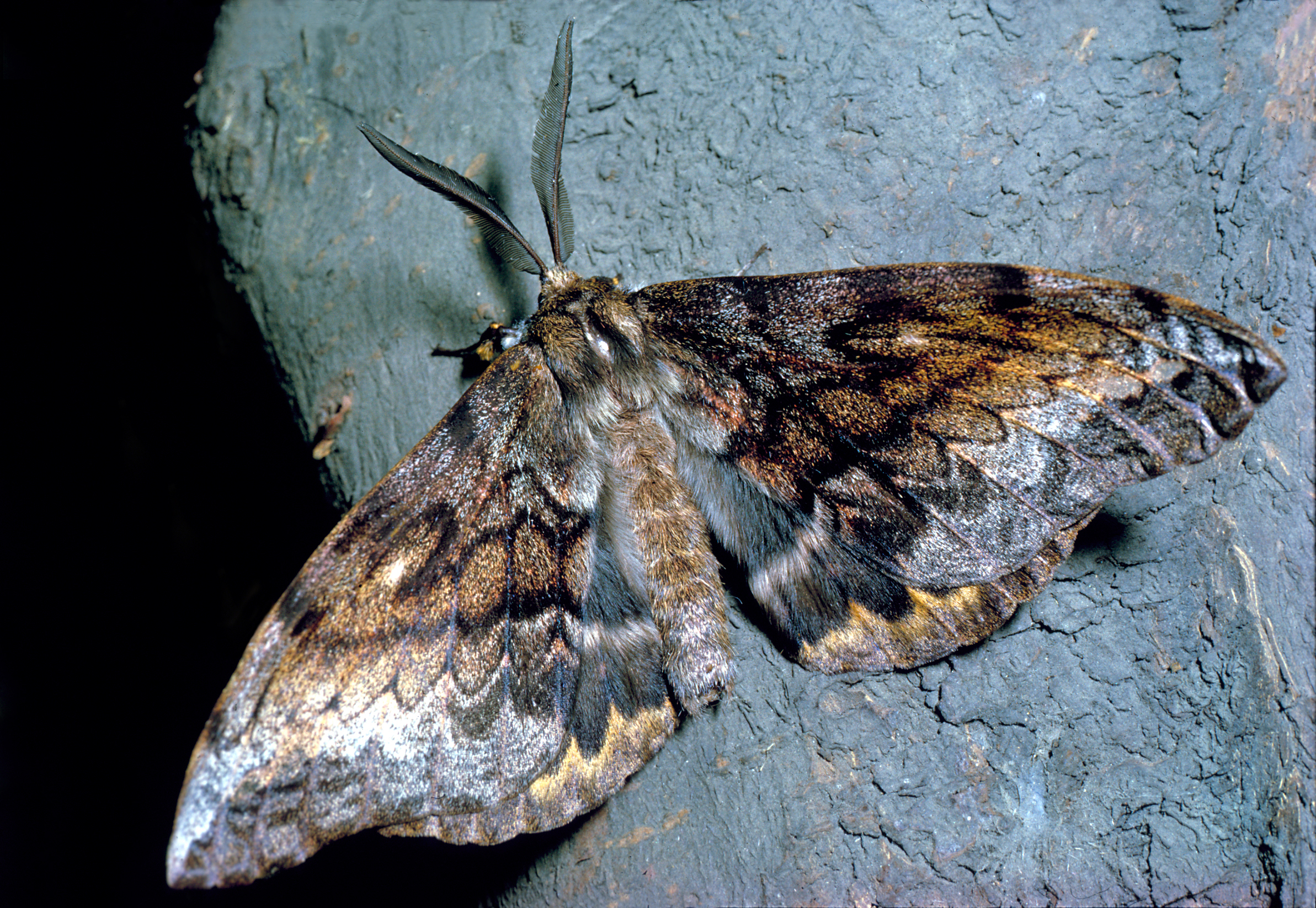

Scientific classification
- Domain: Eukaryota
- Kingdom: Animalia
- Phylum: Arthropoda
- Class: Insecta
- Order: Lepidoptera
- Family: Anthelidae
- Genus: Chelepteryx
- Species: C. collesi

Binomial name
- Chelepteryx collesi Gray, 1835

Synonyms
- Saturnia laplacei Feisthamel, 1839; Festra affabricata Wallengren, 1858; Chelepteryx collesii

= Chelepteryx collesi =

Species of moth

Chelepteryx collesi, the batwing moth or white stemmed gum moth, is a moth of the family Anthelidae. The species was first described by John Edward Gray in 1835. It is found in Australasia.

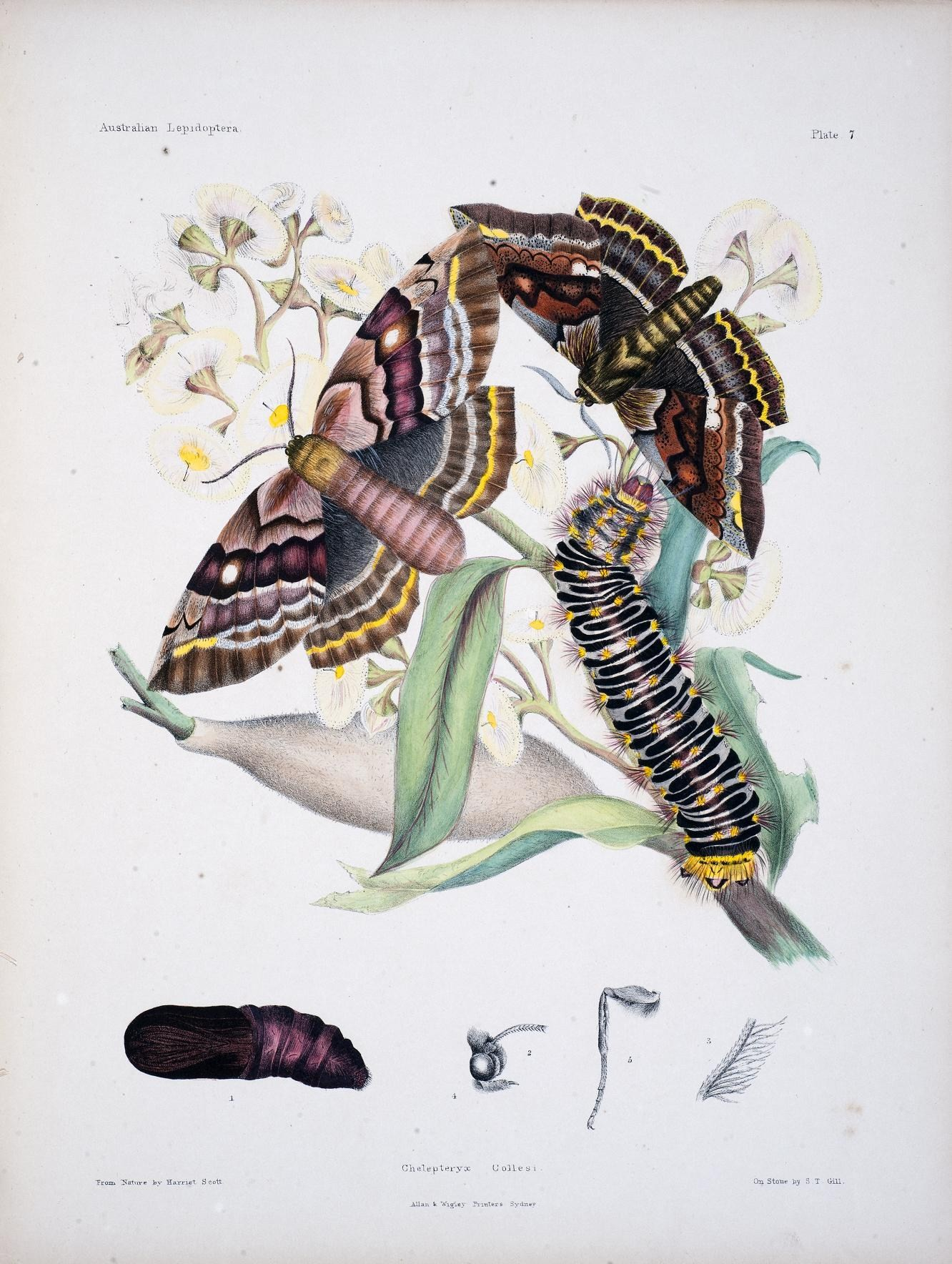
Australian lepidoptera and their transformations, drawn from the life (Pl. 7)

The wingspan of the female can range up to 160 mm; the male has a wingspan that ranges to about 140 mm.

The larvae feed on Myrtaceae species. They are the largest caterpillars in Australia, growing to a length of 15 cm, and they have many sharp urticating hairs. The hairs are sharp and very difficult to dislodge once embedded in the skin. The cocoons are also large and are similarly protected by stinging hairs.

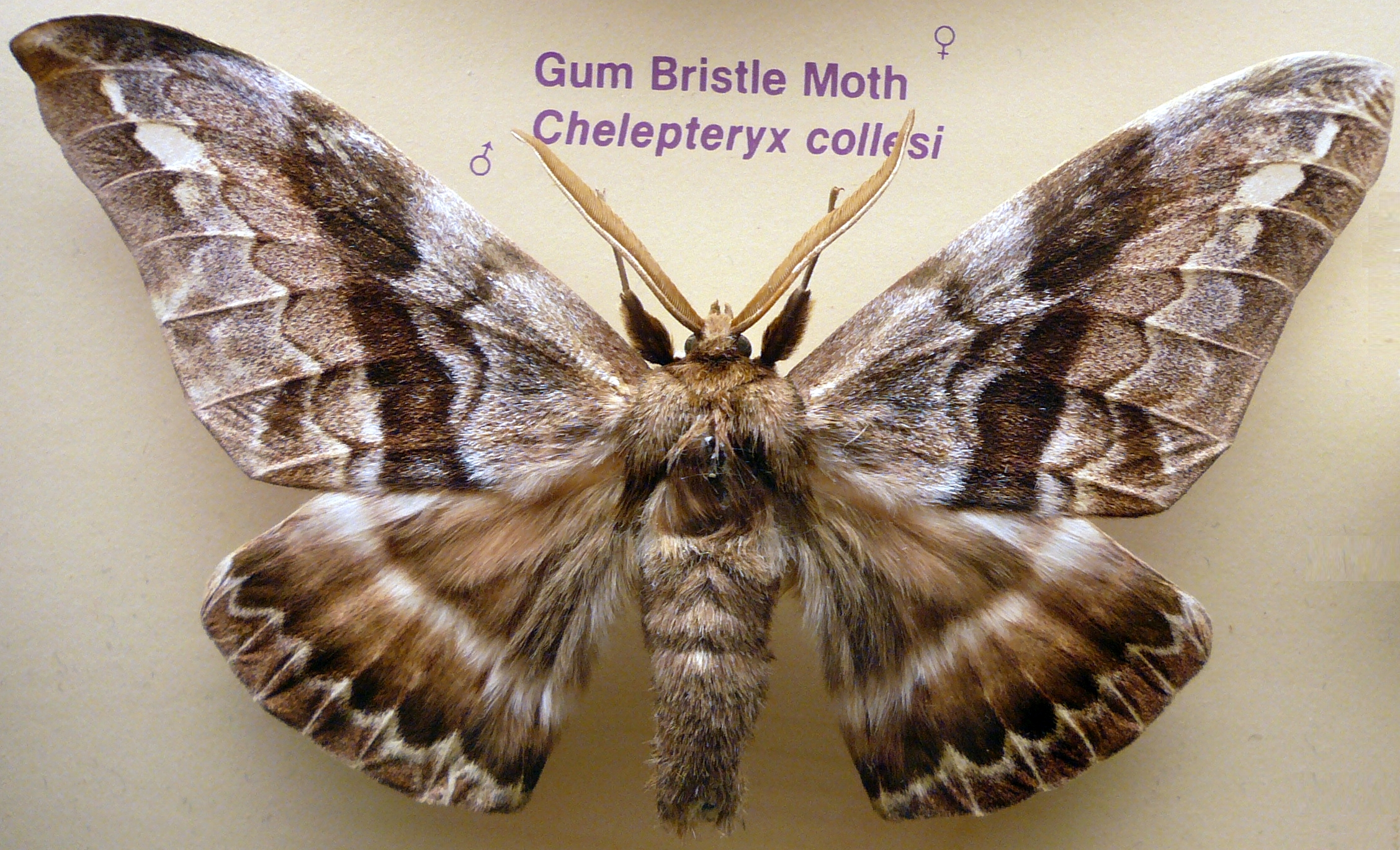
Male, Australian Museum, Sydney

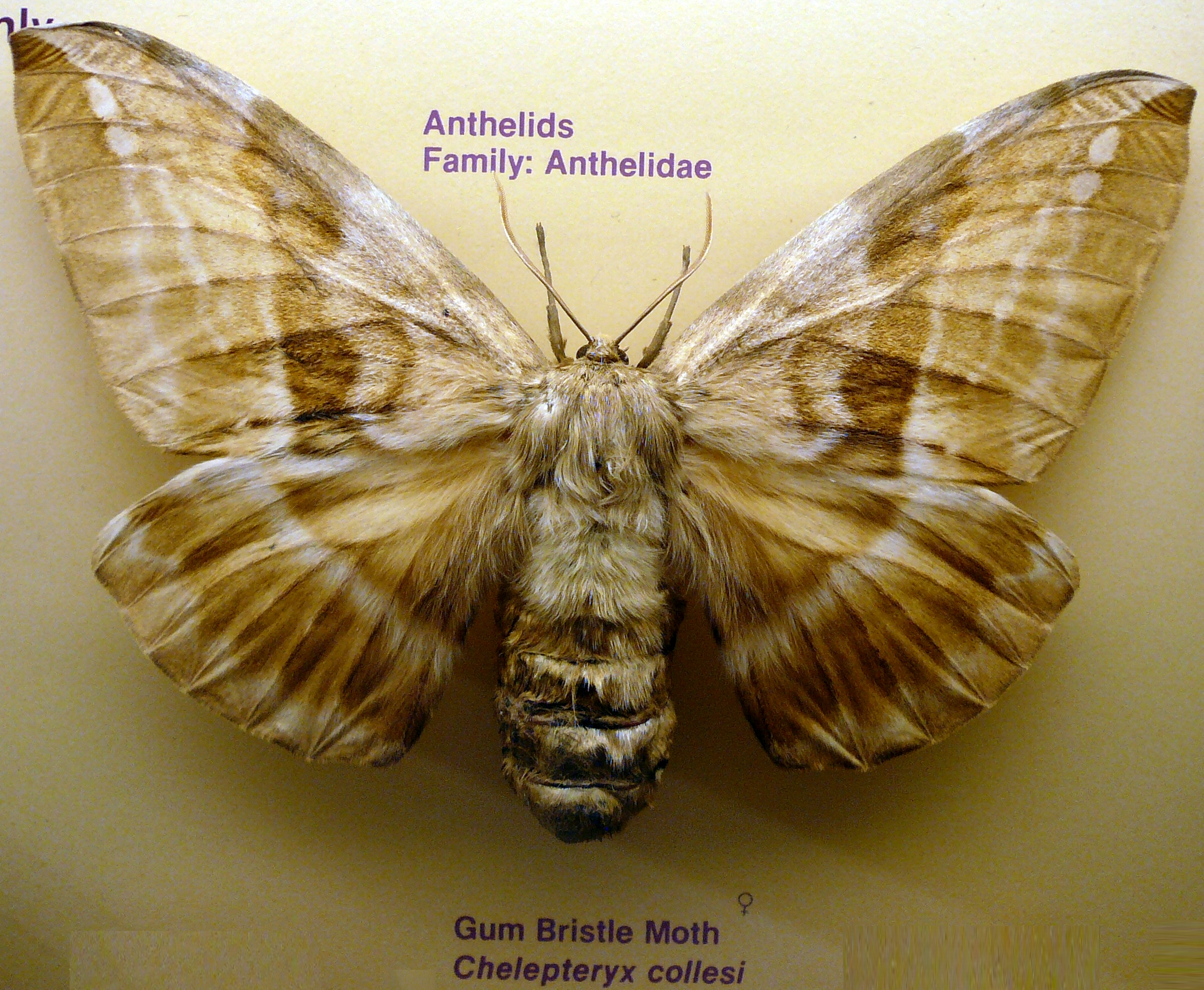
Female, Australian Museum, Sydney
