= Manuel Monge (military figure) =

Portuguese military and political figure

Captain Monge aboard the Uíge (6.º man on the left, top row)

Manuel Soares Monge is a Portuguese military and political figure. He is a general in the Portuguese army. He was born in Vila Nova de São Bento 18 February 1938, in Serpa Municipality.

During the colonial war he made four tours of duty in Africa: two in Portuguese Angola, the last two in Portuguese Guinea. In 1968, he was appointed commander in chief of Portuguese Guinea.

He was then a Portuguese army major and one of the faithful of António de Spínola, who was one of the important people of the Carnation Revolution which occurred on 25 April 1974.

He was a member of the Movimento dos Capitães and Comissão Coordenadora do MFA and military advisor to the President and given responsibility for relations with Macau.

He was civil governor of the District of Beja until 2011.
