= Vila Nova de São Bento e Vale de Vargo =

- Civil parish
- Location in Portugal
- Coordinates: 37.93°N 7.41°W
- Country: Portugal
- Region: Alentejo
- Intermunic. comm.: Baixo Alentejo
- District: Beja
- Municipality: Serpa

Area
  - Total: 300.25 km^{2} (115.93 sq mi)

Population (2011)
  - Total: 4,040
  - Density: 13/km^{2} (35/sq mi)
- Time zone: UTC+00:00 (WET)
  - Summer (DST): UTC+01:00 (WEST)

Vila Nova de São Bento e Vale de Vargo is a civil parish in the municipality of Serpa, Portugal. It was formed in 2013 by the merger of the former parishes Vila Nova de São Bento and Vale de Vargo. The population in 2011 was 4,040, in an area of 300.25 km^{2}.
