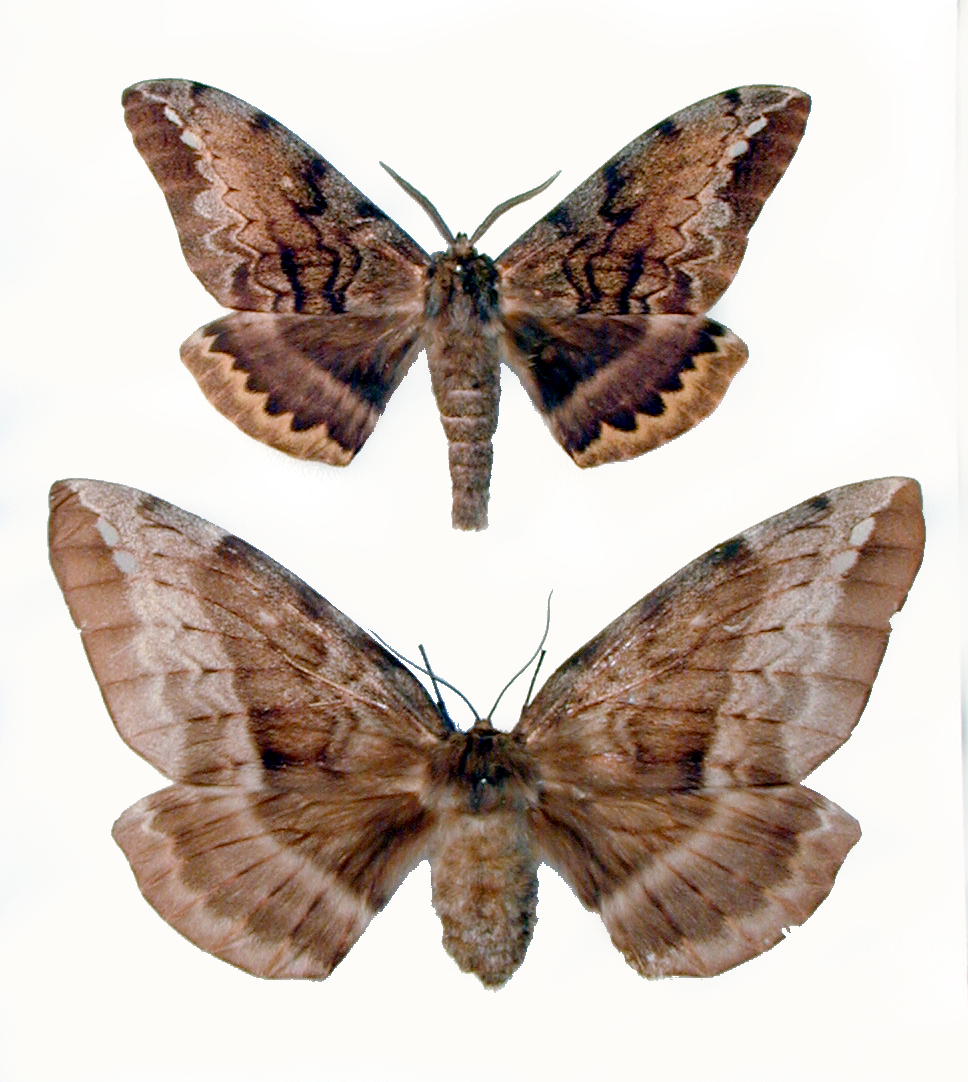
- Male and female Chelepteryx collesi

Scientific classification
- Kingdom: Animalia
- Phylum: Arthropoda
- Class: Insecta
- Order: Lepidoptera
- Family: Anthelidae
- Genus: Chelepteryx; Gray, 1835

Synonyms
- Megethna Walker, 1855; Festra Wallengren, 1858

= Chelepteryx =

Genus of moths

Chelepteryx is a genus of moths of the family Anthelidae first described by George Robert Gray in 1835.

== Species ==
- Chelepteryx chalepteryx Felder, 1874
- Chelepteryx collesi Gray, 1835
