= Etelvina Lopes de Almeida =

Portuguese journalist, writer, broadcaster and politician

Etelvina Lopes de Almeida ComC
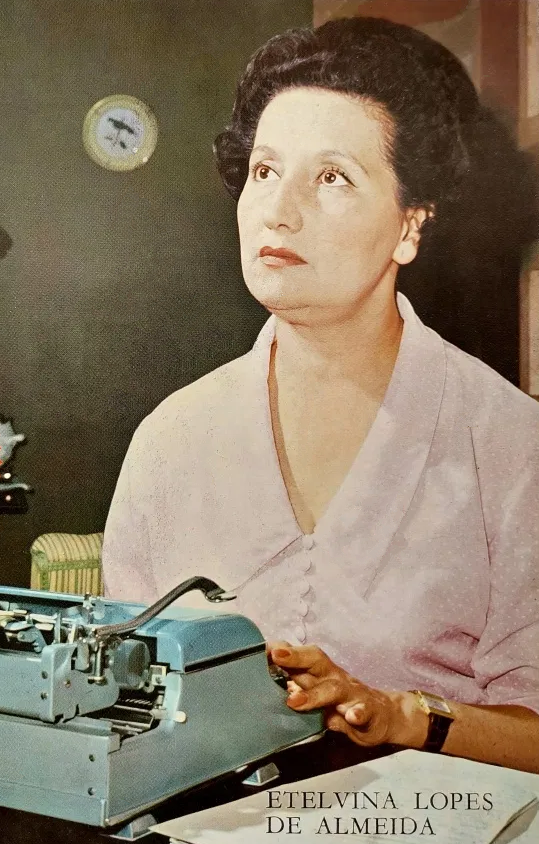
- Lopes de Almeida, 1966

Member of the Constituent Assembly of Portugal
- In office 1975–1976
- Parliamentary group: Portuguese Socialist Party (PS)
- Constituency: Portugal

Deputy in the Portuguese Assembly of the Republic.
- In office 1976–1980

Personal details
- Born: 17 March 1916 Serpa, Portugal
- Died: 30 April 2004 (Aged 88) Tábua, Portugal
- Party: Portuguese: Socialist Party (PS)

Etelvina Lopes de Almeida (1916–2004) was a Portuguese writer, journalist, broadcaster and deputy for the Portuguese Socialist Party (PS) in the Assembly of the Republic.

== Early life ==
Etelvina Lopes de Almeida was born in Serpa in the Alentejo region of Portugal on 17 March 1916. She attended high school in the Portuguese capital of Lisbon, and a boarding school in Queluz to the west of Lisbon. She began her career as a journalist and writer at the children's newspaper O Papagaio. In 1941, she started working at Rádio Renascença, a station owned by the Catholic Church. Beginning as a secretary she graduated to being an announcer. Later, she worked at the magazine Modas & Bordados, a supplement of the O Século newspaper. The magazine was edited by Maria Lamas, a leading feminist. In 1946, when Lamas was appointed president of the Conselho Nacional das Mulheres Portuguesas (National Council of Portuguese Women - CNMP), Lopes de Almeida became editor of that magazine and also wrote short stories and reports for the magazine O Século Ilustrado. She also published several books of recipes, as well as children's books, and contributed to the radio station, Rádio Clube Português.

== Opposition to government ==
In 1944, Lopes de Almeida started working as an announcer for Emissora Nacional de Radiodifusão. A year later she was one of the early supporters of the Movement of Democratic Unity (MUD), a quasi-legal organization set up after World War II in opposition to the Portuguese Estado Novo dictatorship. She became active with the CNMP until its closure by the Estado Novo in 1947. In 1962, she was dismissed from Modas & Bordados for political reasons, having signed a petition against the colonial war in Africa. Because of the danger of arrest for publishing articles hostile to the government, she began to write using pseudonyms. In 1968 she went to Paris, sending back reports to O Século about Portuguese emigrants in the city who were opponents of the regime. In 1969 she was a candidate for the Comissão Eleitoral de Unidade Democrática (Electoral Commission for Democratic Unity - CEUD) for the national assembly, although with no hope of success as the elections were controlled by the Estado Novo.

== Member of parliament ==
After the Carnation Revolution of 25 April 1974, which overthrew the Estado Novo, Lopes de Almeida headed Radiodifusão Portuguesa Internacional, visiting several Portuguese communities abroad as part of her work. She represented the Portuguese Socialist Party (PS) in the Constituent Assembly of Portugal, which agreed a new Constitution for the country, and was a Deputy in the first Legislature of the Assembly of the Republic, from 1976 to 1978, representing the Évora constituency and in the second Legislature (1979–80), representing Lisbon.

== Later life ==
In later life she devoted herself to the problems of the elderly and was a founder of Fundação Sara Beirão / António Costa Carvalho in Tábua in Portugal'’s Coimbra district. In 1993, Lopes de Almeida chaired, in Strasbourg, a session of the European Parliament for the Elderly, during which the European Charter for the Elderly was approved. Etelvina Lopes de Almeida died on 30 April 2004 in Tábua, after a long illness.

== Awards and honours ==
- In 1982, she was elected Woman of the Year by the National Council of Women in Brazil.
- In 1995, she was made a Commander of the Portuguese Order of Merit.
