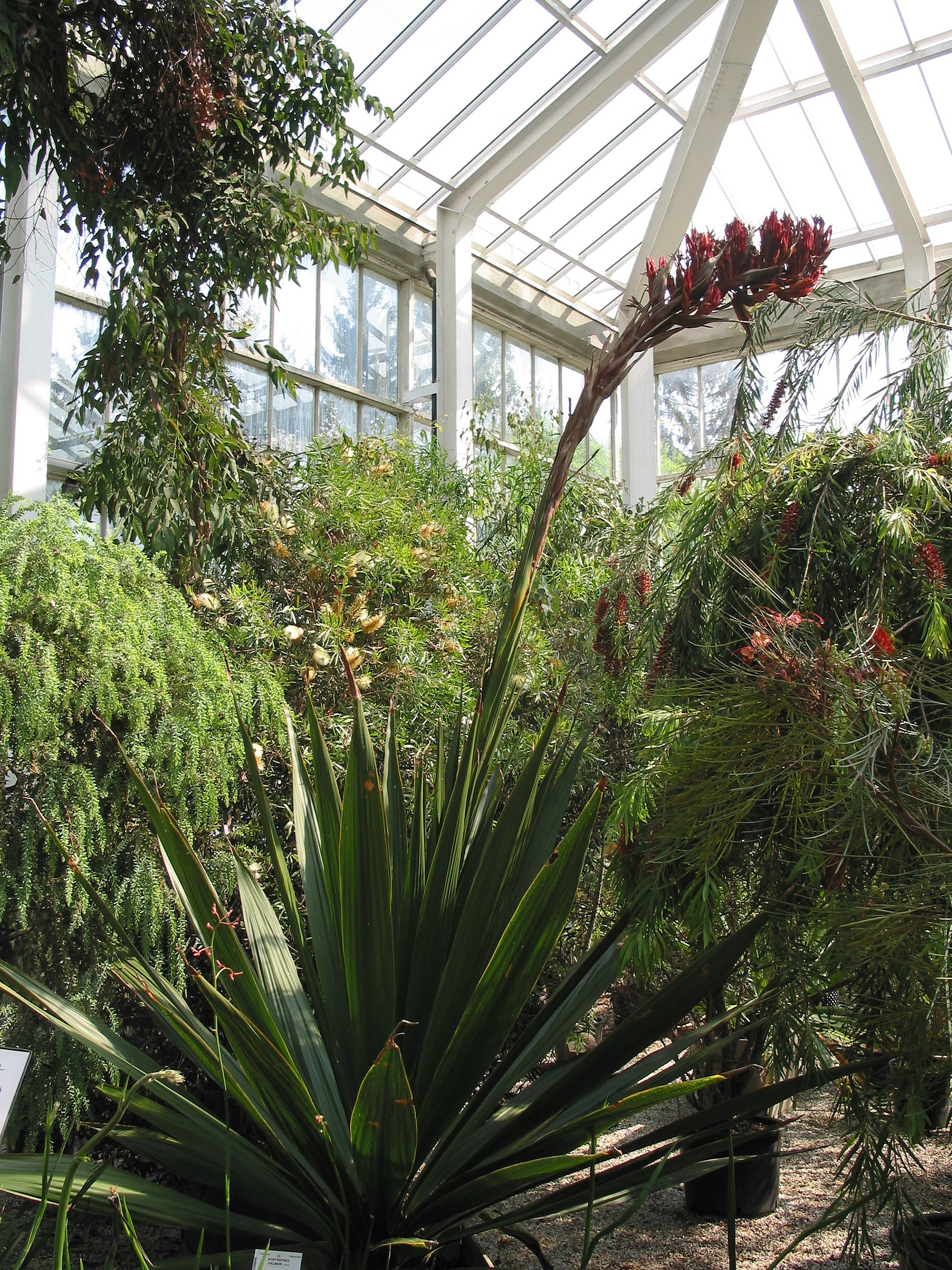

Scientific classification
- Kingdom: Plantae
- Clade: Tracheophytes
- Clade: Angiosperms
- Clade: Monocots
- Order: Asparagales
- Family: Doryanthaceae
- Genus: Doryanthes
- Species: D. palmeri

Binomial name
- Doryanthes palmeri A.W.Hill

= Doryanthes palmeri =

Giant spear lily

Species of flowering plant

Doryanthes palmeri, also known as the giant spear lily, is one of only two species of plant in the genus Doryanthes and the family Doryanthaceae, both being endemic to eastern Australia. It grows in a rosette and the leaves can reach the length of about 3 m (10 ft). The flowers arise in springtime on a stalk which may reach 5 m (16 ft) in height. A succulent perennial, its leaves are hairless and grow in the shape of a sword. The giant spear lily is listed as Vulnerable under the New South Wales Threatened Species Act (1995).

Doryanthes palmeri is grown as an ornamental plant. It does not tolerate frosts, so in temperate zones it requires protection during the winter months. It requires a sheltered position in full sun.

== Gallery ==
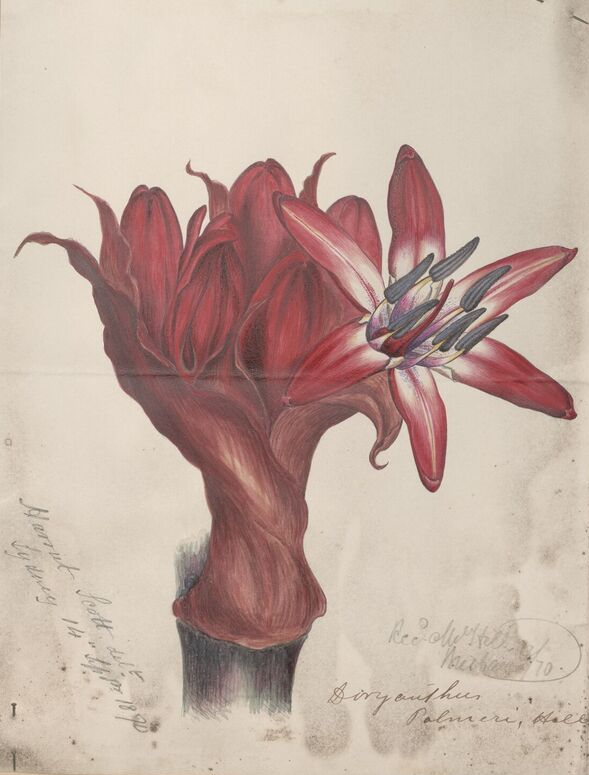
A scientific illustration

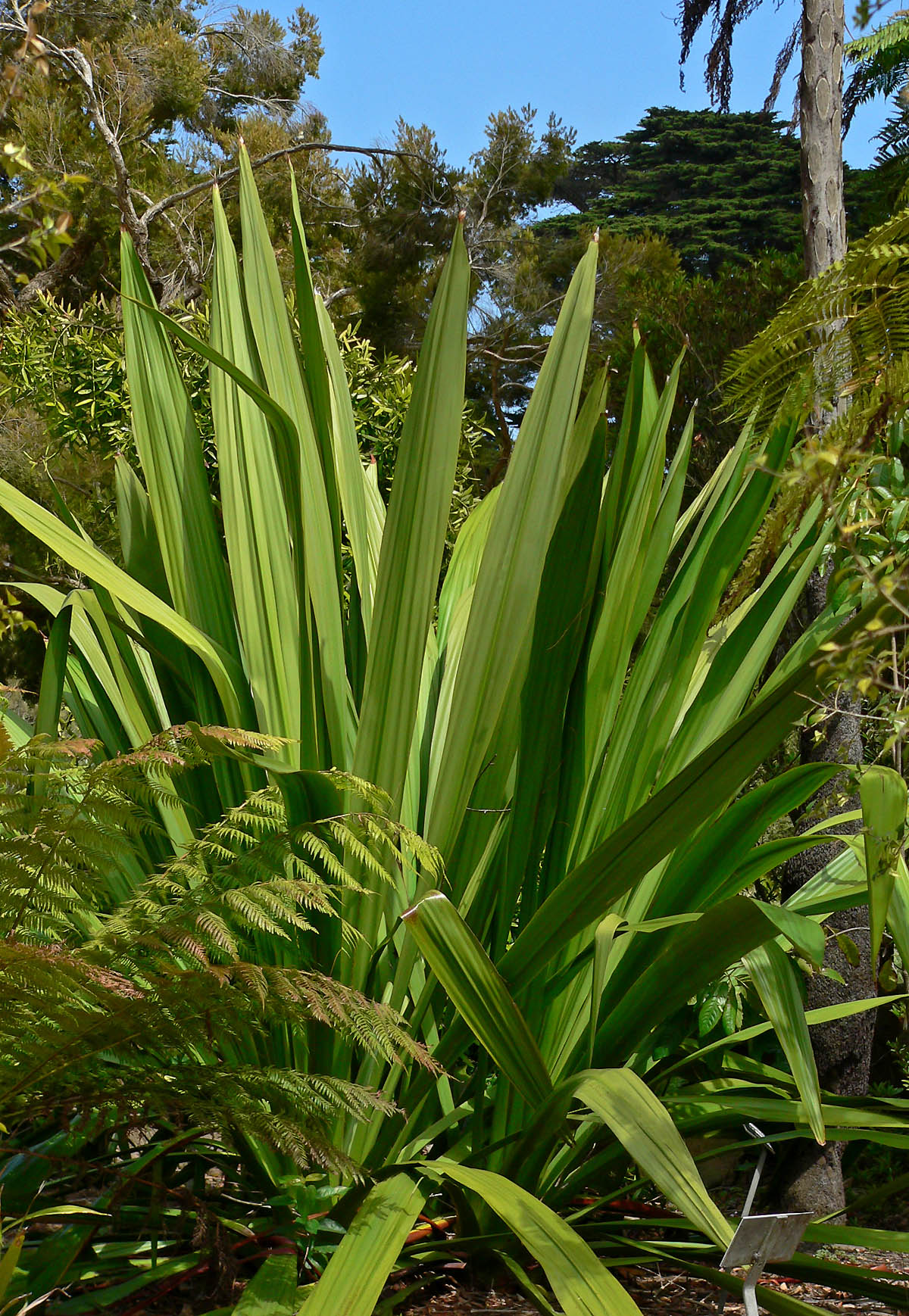
Foliage of a specimen at the San Francisco Botanical Garden

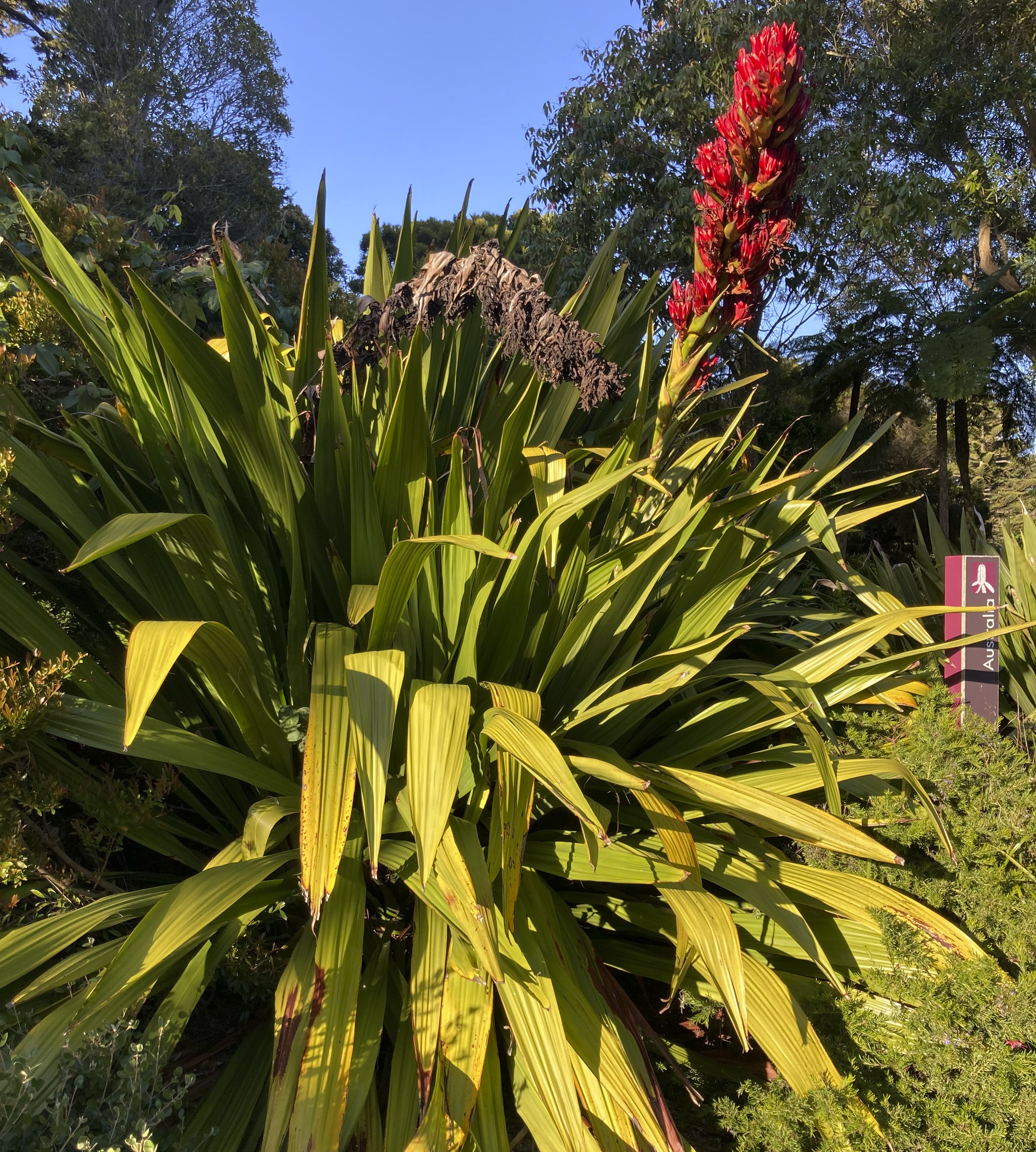
The same specimen blooming

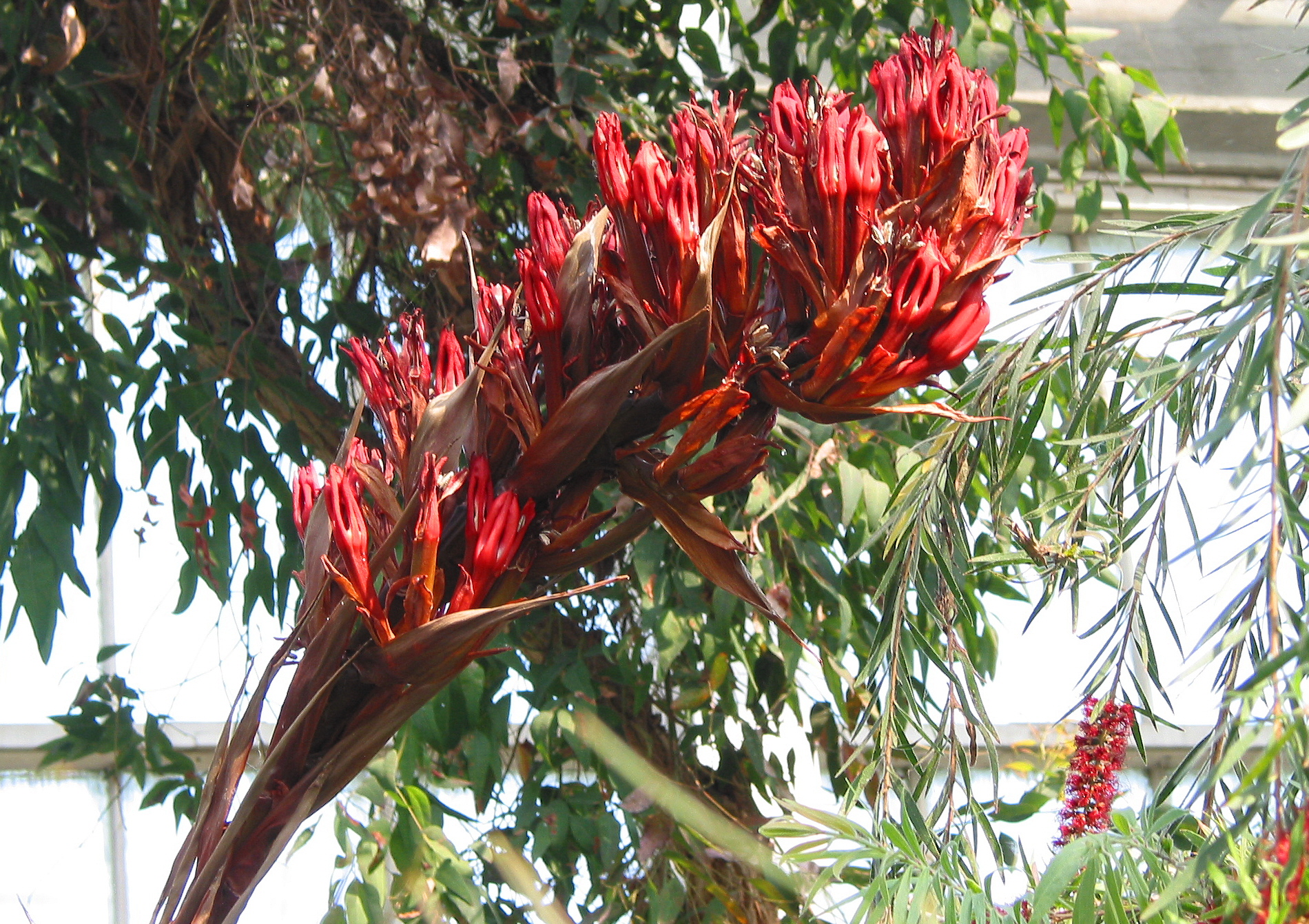
Detail of the inflorescence

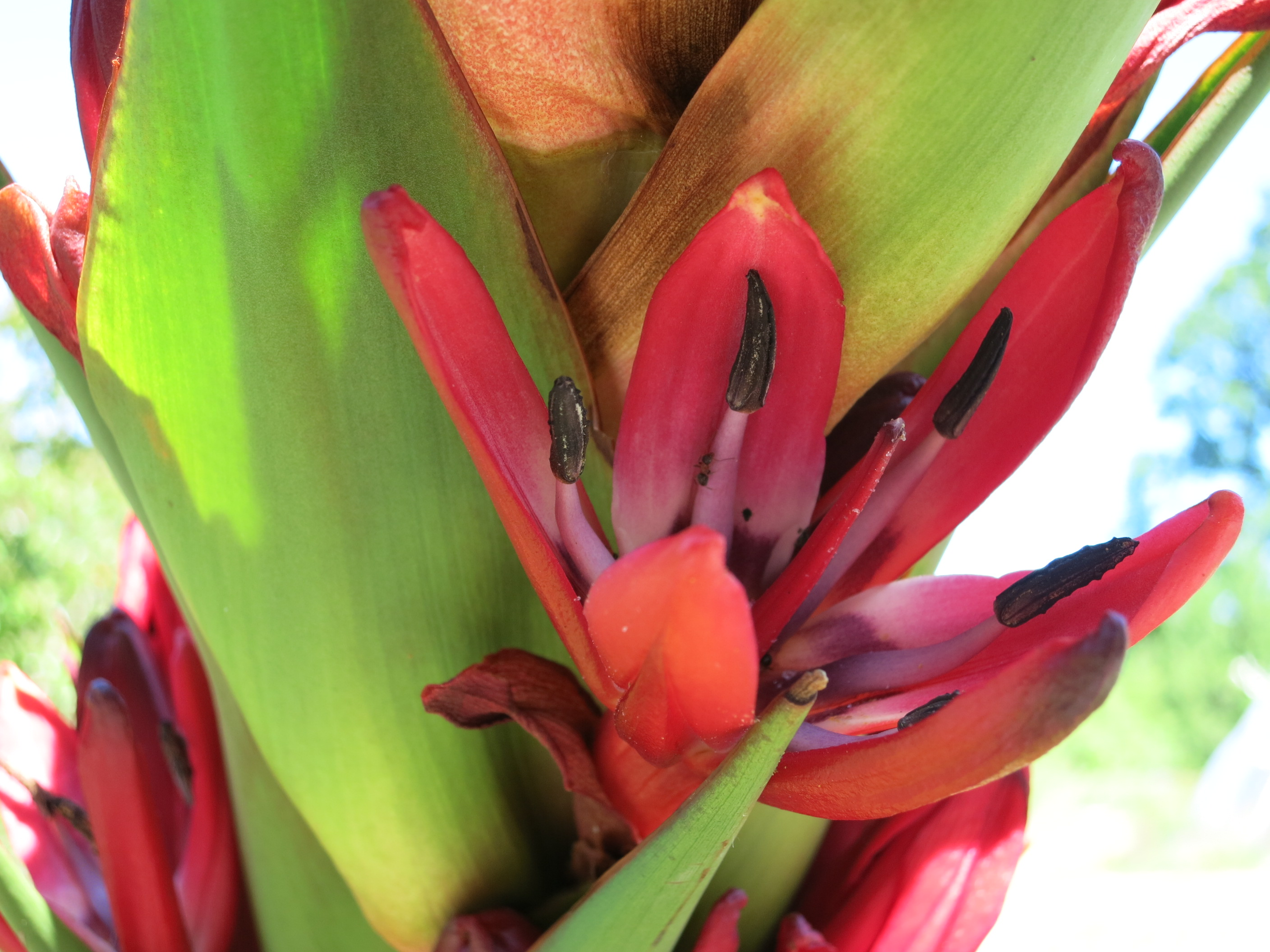
Detail of the flower

== See also ==
- List of plants known as lily
