= Igreja de Santa Maria (Sintra) =

Church in Sintra, Portugal

Coordinates: 38.79487°N 9.383418°W

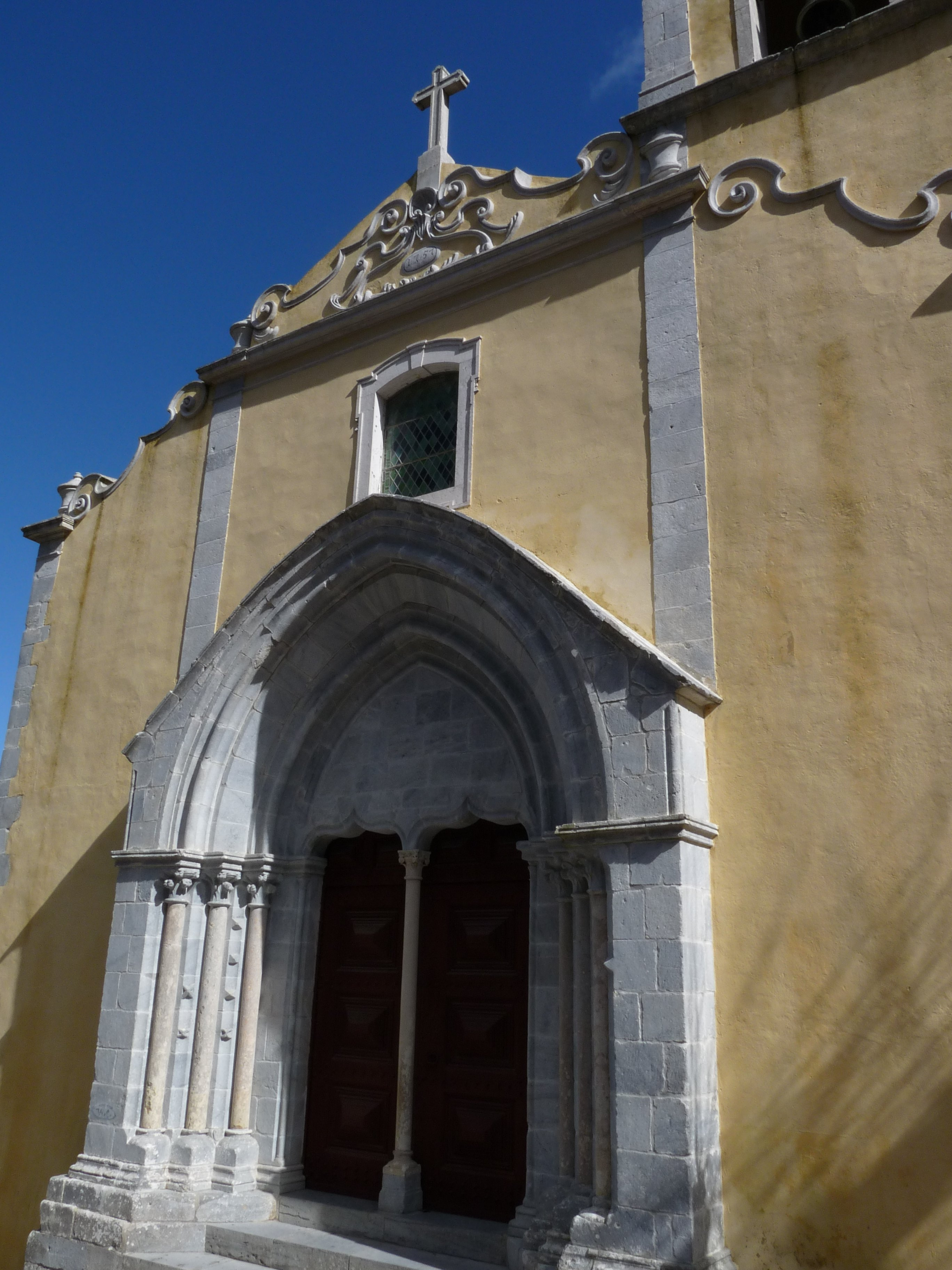
Igreja de Santa Maria

Igreja de Santa Maria (English: Church of Santa Maria) is a church in Sintra, Portugal. It has been classified as a National Monument since 1922 and is part of the Cultural Landscape of Sintra, a World Heritage Site since 1995. The church, with three naves, represents the transition between Romanesque and Gothic of the mid-12th century.
