= Igreja de Santa Maria (Loures) =

Church in Loures, Lisbon District, Portugal

Coordinates: 38.8328582°N 9.1771195°W

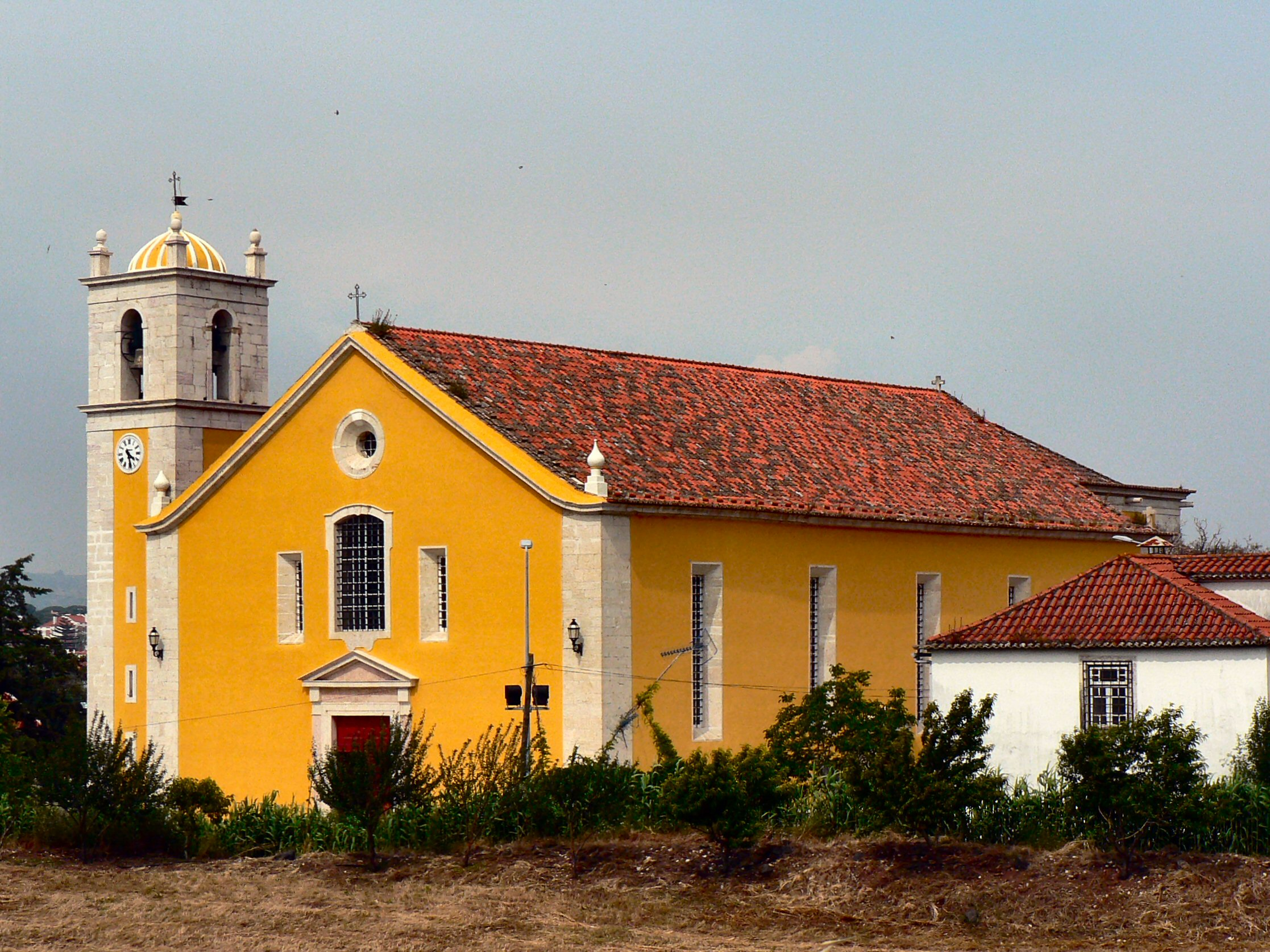
Igreja de Santa Maria

Igreja de Santa Maria is a church in Portugal. It is classified as a National Monument.
