= Nuno Martins da Silveira =

Portuguese nobleman (1380-?)

- Lord
- Born: 1380; Portugal
- Died: c. 1450; Portugal
- Occupation: Military

Nuno Martins da Silveira (1380-1450s) was a Portuguese nobleman, Lord and alcaide of Terena. Escrivão da puridade, (King's private secretary) of Afonso V in 1450.

== Biography ==
Nuno was the son of Martim Gil Pestana and Maria Gonçalves da Silveira. His wife was Leonor Falcão daughter of João Falcão, and maternal granddaughter of Gonçalo Anes de Abreu.
