= Les Bursill =

Australian academic

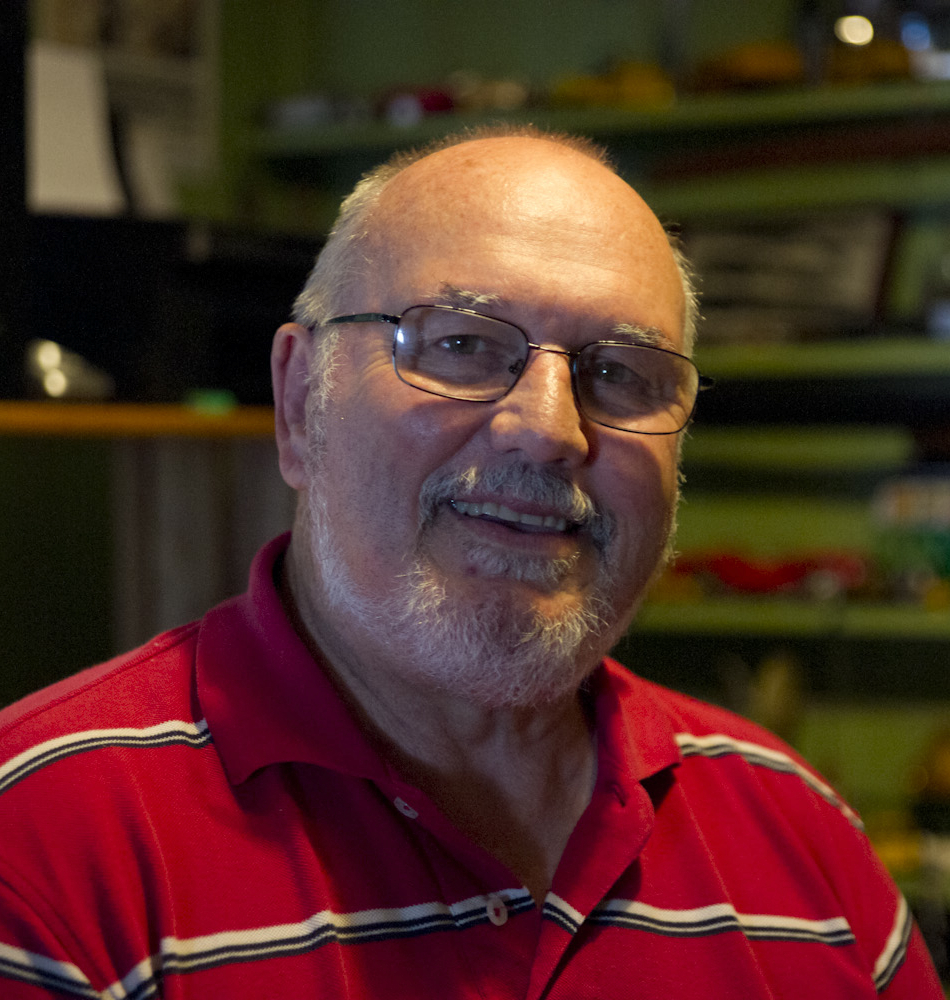
Les Bursill

Leslie William Bursill (OAM) (4 February 1945 – 16 February 2019) was a Dharawal (Aboriginal Australian) historian, archaeologist, anthropologist, and publisher, born in Hurstville, New South Wales, in February 1945. His father, Wallace Richard Bursill, was serving in the 7th Division of the Australian Imperial Force (2nd) (AIF) in New Guinea at the time of Bursill's birth. Although Bursill is strongly identified with the Dharawal of southern Sydney (in 2009, he became chair of the Sutherland Shire Aboriginal Advisory Committee), his maternal Dharawal forebears hailed from the area between Kangaroo Valley and the coast near Nowra. Bursill was made a Justice of the Peace at Sutherland Court House in 1976. In 1995, he was appointed Lecturer in Mental Health and Counselling at the University of Sydney. He was awarded the Centenary Medal in 2001. In 2007, he was awarded the NSW Police Commanders Award for excellence in teaching. In 2008, he was appointed Adjunct Lecturer at Charles Sturt University, Wagga Wagga. In 2009, he was awarded a Premiers Heritage Volunteer Award and also received a Certificate of Excellence for Teaching from the Australian College of Educators. He received the Order of Australia Medal in that same year.

== Early career ==
At 18 years of age, Bursill joined the Citizen Military Forces (CMF) (1 Div Pro Coy.) and served in its ranks for some three years. He was then called up for National Service in the Artillery (12th Field Regiment 131 Divisional Locating Co.) in 1966, but did not see action during the Vietnam War. Nevertheless, he remained in the military beyond his National Service obligations and subsequently received the National Service Medal and Australian Defence Medal. After his discharge from the army, Bursill resumed work as a compositor with the Sydney Morning Herald and settled in Engadine, New South Wales where he and his first wife, Barbara Ann Bursill (née Child, died of ovarian cancer in 2003), had already purchased a home. There they raised a daughter and two sons. Les Bursill worked a total of twenty-one years with the [Sydney Morning Herald and the Australian Financial Review. He was night manager, photo-composing, when he resigned in 1984 to pursue part-time tertiary studies. Bursill later moved away from Engadine to spend the rest of his life in his traditional country near Nowra, New South Wales.

== Studies ==
Bursill completed a Trades Certificate in Hand and Machine Composing whilst working for William Neville and Co. Printers in Sussex Street, Sydney in 1965. He worked as a compositor for a number of years before moving on to the Fairfax owned Sydney Morning Herald where he was soon promoted to Leading Hand (Facsimile Transmission Section) and then to supervisor. At that time he and his wife Barbara Ann Bursill both commenced studies at Armidale university in 1982/83. They both started and completed a Bachelor of Arts in History and Archaeology (Les) and English and Archaeology (Barbara) at the University of New England and then both embarked on a Master of Letters, at the same university. Les on the anthropology of the Aboriginal people of Sydney, and Barbara in English. They both received an M.Litt in 1993. Over a ten-year period, he also completed qualifications in Workplace Occupational Health and Safety, Pharmacology (effects of drug and alcohol) and counselling. In 1990, Bursill entered the New South Wales (NSW) Government. In 1993, he was promoted and moved to the head office of the New South Wales Department of Corrective Services, Sydney, where he made many important contributions in the development of counselling techniques for Aboriginal prisoners with drug and alcohol problems in New South Wales prisons and published a set of booklets on overcoming violence and alcohol abuse. With Zoe de Crespigny he also presented a paper on 'Best Practice Interventions in Corrections for Indigenous People' in 2001. Bursill attended many conferences in the role of Aboriginal AOD Co-ordinator in Corrective Services.

In 1995, Bursill took two years leave to lecture in Counselling and Mental Health at the University of Sydney. In 1997, he became a Court Advisor in Bankstown, assisting magistrates in sentencing decisions, before returning to the Corrective Services Head Office in 1999. In 2005, Bursill became a lecturer in continuing education with the New South Wales Police Service and received a Police Commander's Award for professionalism in teaching in 2007. He had earlier been awarded the Centenary Medal, in 2010 The medal of Order of Australia and the Public Service Medal (15 years).

== Archaeological and Anthropological contributions ==
Bursill has made an important contribution in studying and disseminating knowledge of the heritage of the Dharawal in the Sutherland Shire, the Illawarra and beyond. He has personally recorded some 300 archaeological sites in the Sutherland Shire. He has served on Sutherland Shire Council's Heritage Committee since early 2000. He was instrumental in bringing together a catalogue of both archaeological and built-heritage items for the Shire in digital form on CD ROM. For over thirty years, he has been a member of the Sutherland Shire Historical Society and has served as its research officer and archivist between 2001 and 2008. Between May 2000 and November 2004, he edited the society's quarterly bulletin.

In 2007, Bursill was one of the two principal authors (with Mary Jacobs) of a pioneering book on his indigenous community, launched by Bruce Baird on 5 March 2008.

Reviewing this book, historian Edward Duyker described it as a 'community milestone' and drew attention to the thematic vocabulary compiled by Dr Jackelin Troy and Bursill as 'an important local linguistic resource' which will and give 'added meaning to all who seek environmental engagement from a Dharawal perspective'

== Publishing ==
Bursill produced five pamphlets on Aboriginal Drug and Alcohol issues for NSW Aboriginal inmates to assist them in changing and improving their lives in a drug-free environment. Bursill was elected Editor of the Sutherland Shire Historical Society Bulletin in December 2001 and held that position till late in 2004. Remaining on the executive of the society, he changed positions to that of 'Archivist and Research Officer'. In August 2008, Bursill became the founding editor of a new journal of local history, art, and natural history named Doryanthes (after the genus of the Gymea Lily, endemic to the Sutherland Shire and Illawarra). In 2009, Dawn Emerson, a former deputy mayor of the Sutherland Shire, became editor, but has since retired, guest editors are active each quarter. Bursill, however, has remained publisher. In 2009, he also became an adjunct lecturer at Charles Sturt University and initiated a 'Virtual Museum' (shirevirtual.tk) for the Sutherland Shire. In the same year, Bursill and Mary Jacobs incorporated "Dharawal Publishing Inc." and continue to produce printed and web-based material under that Incorporated imprint. In 2012, Bursill produced three more books. A Collection of Dharawal Words and Phrases. Edited by Les Bursill ISBN 978-0-9870727-3-3 and The Story of Deeban, The Bay of the Whales and Creation Serpent. ISBN 978-0-9870727-1-9. He re-published his ancestor, Dr. Ellis's work on Aboriginal plant names in conjunction with Sir William Macarthur. He has since worked in collaboration With Dr Mike Donaldson and Mary Jacobs and produced two new books. The History of the Illawarra, Before Colonisation Volume 1. And The History of the Illawarra, after Colonisation Volume 2.

== Community organisations ==
Bursill was chairman of the Sutherland Shire Council Aboriginal Advisory Committee but gave up that position in January 2013 due to ill health and has resigned from the committee. He is a founding member of the Kurranulla Aboriginal Corporation and Chairman of Dharawal Publications Inc. In June 2009, he was appointed a legatee (St George and Sutherland) of Legacy Australia an organisation which cares for the dependants of deceased Australian servicemen. In June 2010 he was elected as Chairman of the St. George and Sutherland Division of Legacy NSW. He completed two years as chairman in June 2012 and was a member of the Legacy N.S.W. Education Committee. Bursill resigned from Legacy in July 2013 due to ill health. He is a board member for the Southern Metropolitan Cemeteries trust and was a board member for the NSW Mental Health Association, but resigned from that board, again due to ill health. He was appointed a member of the Relationships Australia Ethics Committee in April 2012.

== Quotes ==
"Meaning is for those who are ready for it, for those who are trained for it. The rest get pretty pictures". Bursill quoted by Paul Bahn,

“Once you accept that this is it, then life truly demands that you do your utmost with what you have here". Atheists Convention Blog, 12 March 2010

"Yura marri ngara yanga marri, barrbanga gurlibuwa" (People become great as they hear and do good things as they learn to copy the proper way of doing things.) Dharawal motto for the Sutherland Shire 'Virtual Museum', 19 July 2009.
