= José Correia da Serra =

Portuguese politician (1750–1823)

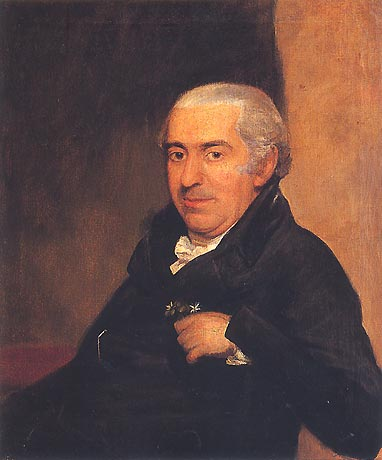
- Abbé Correa, by Domenico Pellegrini (1759–1840).
- Born: 6 June 1750; Serpa, Kingdom of Portugal
- Died: 11 September 1823 (aged 73); Caldas da Rainha, Kingdom of Portugal
- Occupations: Abbot, philosopher, diplomat, politician and scientist

José Francisco Correia da Serra (6 June 1750 – 11 September 1823) was a Portuguese abbot, polymath, philosopher, diplomat, politician and scientist. In some circumstances, he was also known as Abbé Correa. The plant genus Correa, native to Australia, is named in his honour.

== Biography ==
Correia da Serra was born at Serpa, in Alentejo, in 1750, and was educated at Rome, where he took holy orders. In 1777, he returned to Lisbon, where he was one of the founders of the Academia das Ciências de Lisboa in 1779 (then called Academia Real das Ciências de Lisboa; Royal Academy of Sciences of Lisbon).

His published writings brought him into conflict with reactionary members of the religious and political hierarchy in Portugal.

In 1786, he fled to France, and remained there till the death of Portuguese King-consort Pedro III, when he again returned to his homeland, but political difficulties forced him to leave the country again. He went to England, where he found a protector in Sir Joseph Banks, who was President of the Royal Society. With Banks' support, he was easily elected a fellow of the society. In 1797, he was elected a foreign member of the Royal Swedish Academy of Sciences.

In 1797, he was appointed secretary to the Portuguese embassy in London, but a quarrel with the ambassador prompted him to leave. He accompanied the Polish military leader Thaddeus Kosciusko and the Polish poet Julian Ursyn Niemcewicz to the United States, sailing on the ship Adriana from Bristol; the trio reached Philadelphia on 18 August 1797. He eventually returned to Paris 1802, and stayed there for the next eleven years. In 1812, he was elected as a member to the American Philosophical Society.

In 1813, he left Europe for the New World once again, arriving first in New York City. He settled in Philadelphia where he delivered lectures on botany at the University of Pennsylvania. His travels took him several times to Monticello, the home of former President Thomas Jefferson where his political views found a congenial reception. He was elected a Foreign Honorary Member of the American Academy of Arts and Sciences in 1815.

In 1816, he was made Portuguese minister-plenipotentiary at Washington D.C., but resided in Philadelphia.

In 1820, he was recalled home to Portugal, where he was appointed a member of the financial council, and elected to a seat in the "General Extraordinary and Constituent Cortes of the Portuguese Nation", but he died only three years later.

=== Contributions in Geology and Paleontology ===
Although best known as a botanist, Correia da Serra contributed to geology and paleontology. While studying in Italy, he wrote in his diary (April 10, 1774) about his observations of fossils in Corneto (Tarquinia). While in England, Correia da Serra visited the coast of Sutton-on-sea, in Lincolnshire, in 1796, with the famous botanist Joseph Banks, making observations on the existence of a fossil Holocene forest in the intertidal zone which he reported in the article "On a Submarine Forest on the east Coast of England" published in the Philosophical Transactions of the Royal Society of London (1799). In this article, he tried to explain the existence of plant fossils below sea level, showing that they were in situ and had not been transported there. He also uses geological subsidence to explain the descent that those strata that formed on higher topographies and favored forests are now below sea level. Also noteworthy is the study he published in the Transactions of the American Philosophical Society, in 1818, on the formations and soils of Kentucky, in which he mentions the existence of fossils of calcareous shells (p. 176) and of plants that turned into coal (p. 178). To his pupil Francis Walker Gilmer (1790-1826), Correia da Serra acknowledged "I find that the study of fossil remains of plants is now becoming fashionable; discoveries will no doubt be made in this new career" (letter signed in Philadelphia on August 6, 1819).

== Works ==
- Colecção de livros inéditos da história Portuguesa, 4 vols., 1790–1816.

Articles:

- "On the fructification of the submersed Algae," Philosophical Transactions, 1799, pp. 494–505.
- "On a submarine forest on the coast of England," Philosophical Transactions, 1799, pp. 145–155.
- "On two genera of plants belonging to the natural family of the Aurantia," Transactions of the Linnean Society, Vol. 5, pp. 218–226.
- "On the Doryantha, a new genius of plants from New Holland next akin to the Agave," Transactions of the Linnean Society, 6, pp. 211–213.
- "Observations sur la famille des oranges et sur les limites qui la circonscrivent," Annales du Muséum d'Histoire Naturelle, 6, pp. 376–386.
- "Mémoire sur la germination du nelumbo," Annales du Muséum d'Histoire naturelle, 13, 174.
- "Vues Carpologiques/Observations Carpologiques," Annales du Muséum d'Histoire Naturelle, 8, 9, 10.
- "Mémoire sur la valeur du périsperme, considerée comme caractère d'affinité des plantes", Bulletin de la Société Philomatique, 11, 350.
- "De l'état des Sciences, et des lettres en Portugal, à la fin du dixhuitième siècle," Archives litteraires de l'Europe, Vol. I, 1804.
- "Sur l'agriculture des arabes en Espagne", Archives Littéraires de l'Europe, 2, pp. 239–404.
- "Observations and conjectures on the formation and nature of the soil of Kentucky," Transactions of the American Philosophical Society, Philadelphia, 1811.
- "Considerations générales sur l'etat passé et futur de l'Europe," The American Review, 1812.

== See also ==
- Royal Society—Correia da Serra was elected to membership in the Society in 1795; and his nomination letter has been posted with other membership records at the Royal Society web site – here. Those signing his Certificate of Election and Candidature were: James Edward Smith, Aylmer Bourke Lambert, Edward Whitaker Gray, Maxwell Garthshore, Samuel Solly, James Rennell and William Marsden.
