= Serpa =

- Municipality
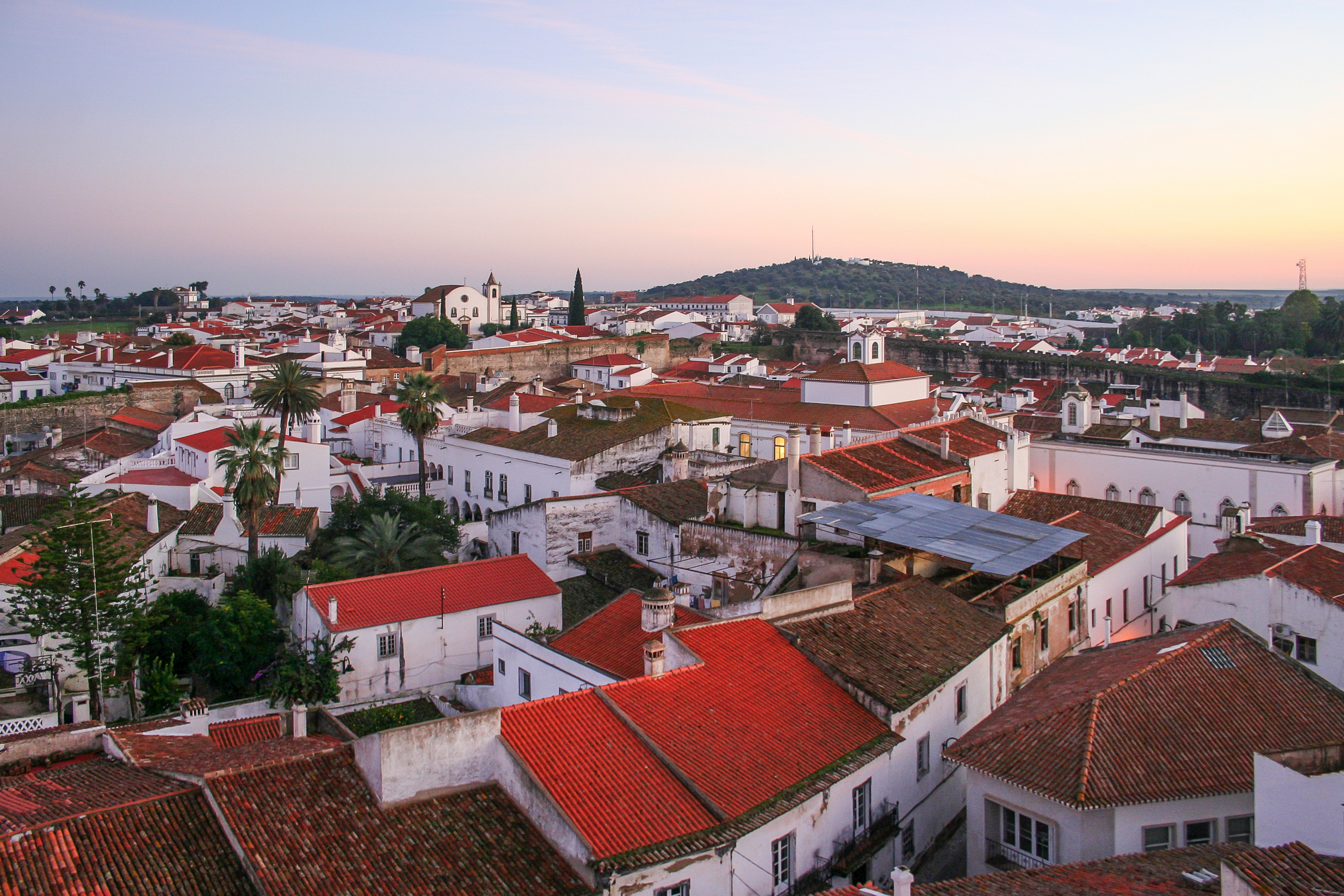
- View of Serpa

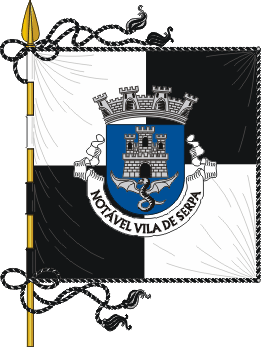
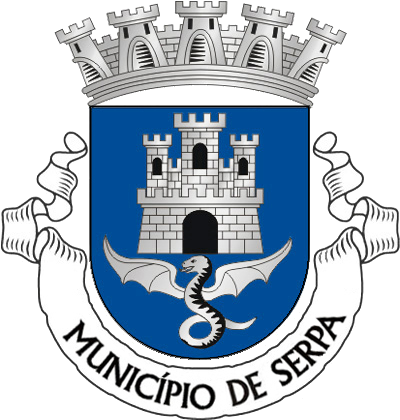
- Flag Coat of arms
- Interactive map of Serpa
- Location within Portugal Location within Europe
- Coordinates: 37°56′41″N 7°35′56″W
- Country: Portugal
- Region: Alentejo
- Intermunic. comm.: Baixo Alentejo
- District: Beja
- Parishes: 5

Government
  - President: João Manuel Silva (CDU)

Area
  - Total: 1,105.63 km^{2} (426.89 sq mi)

Population (2011)
  - Total: 15,623
  - Density: 14.130/km^{2} (36.598/sq mi)
- Time zone: UTC+00:00 (WET)
  - Summer (DST): UTC+01:00 (WEST)
- Local holiday: Holy Tuesday (date varies)
- Website: http://www.cm-serpa.pt/

Serpa (Portuguese pronunciation: [ˈsɛɾpɐ]) is a municipality in the district of Beja in southern Portugal. The population in 2011 was 15,623, in an area of 1,105.63 square kilometres (426.89 mi^{2}). The Guadiana River flows close to the town of Serpa.

== History ==
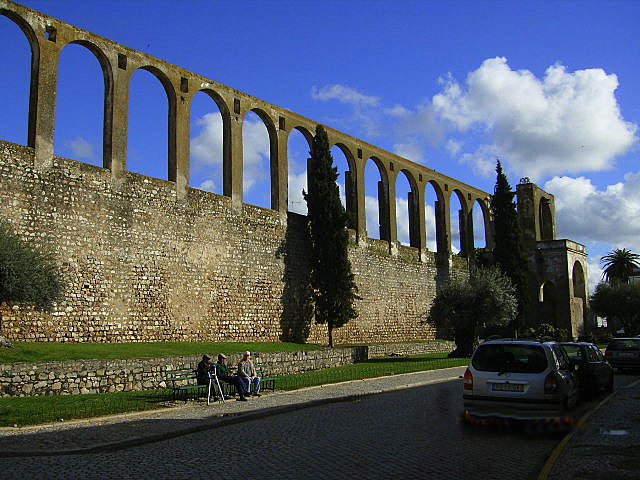
Aqueduct in Serpa

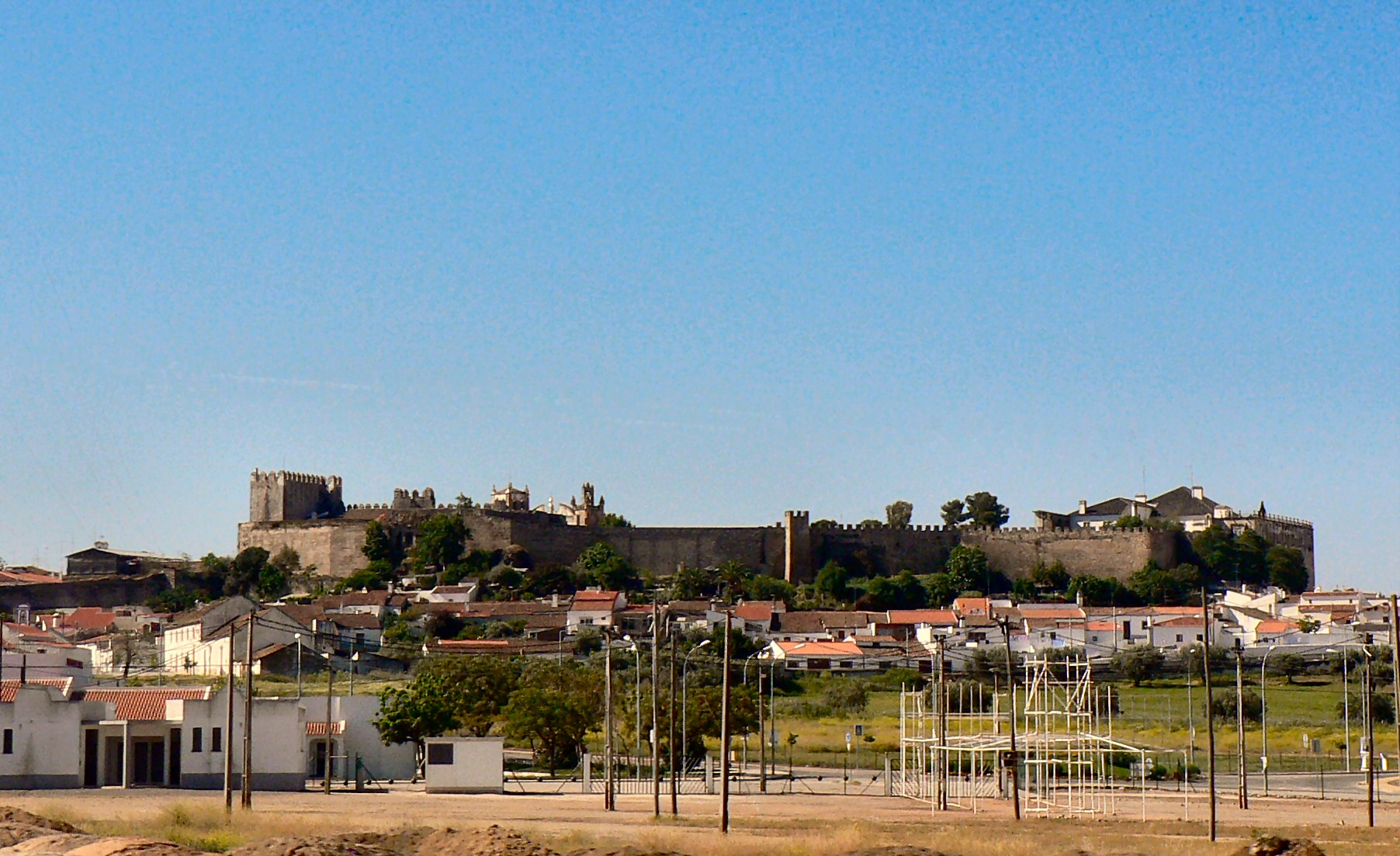
Castle of Serpa

Serpa has its origins in early settlement that preceded the Roman occupation of the Iberian peninsula. Archaeological research in the Serpa area has identified fortified settlements dating to the Late Bronze Age, including the Castelo da Crespa, whose defensive enclosure has been documented through archaeological survey and LiDAR analysis. The neighbouring town of Beja (known as Pax Julia by the Romans) became the capital of southern Lusitanian (Pacensis). Serpa grew through the settlement of Roman colonists, with proof coming from various archaeological remains within the Roman villa.

Moorish settlement followed this period, and remained until the Reconquista (the Christian re-conquest of Iberia).

As a result of Serpa's proximity to the Spanish border, the town has always been a defensive stronghold. In the 13th century, owing to its location on the left bank of the Guadiana, it was occupied by forces loyal to Castile.

On 1281, King D. Alfonso X of Castile delimited the municipality, attributing a Foral (charter) to the town, from Seville, in order to encourage settlement and expansion.

Following the Reconquista, in 1295, Serpa received a new foral from Portuguese King D. Dinis. The local keep that dominated Serpa was partly damaged as a result of the last Spanish invasion. At that time, the king ordered the re-construction of the castle, as well as the erection of a wall fortification.

A new foral was issued in 1513, by King D. Manuel I, who was the former master of Serpa.

During the 17th century, the walls and system of bastions were adapted to serve as a defensive line by Nicolau de Langres (1665).

On 30 January 1954, the walls of Serpa were classified as a Monumento Nacional (National Monument).

Following the Carnation Revolution (in 1974), the Portuguese Communist Party gained strong support in the area, where it continues to be popular.

On 26 August 2003, the town of Serpa was elevated to city status. Meanwhile, on 28 January 2013, the historic centre of Serpa (that included the principal civil parishes) of São Salvador and Santa Maria, was re-incorporated into a single civil parish (Decree 11-A/2013, Diário da República, Série 1, 19).

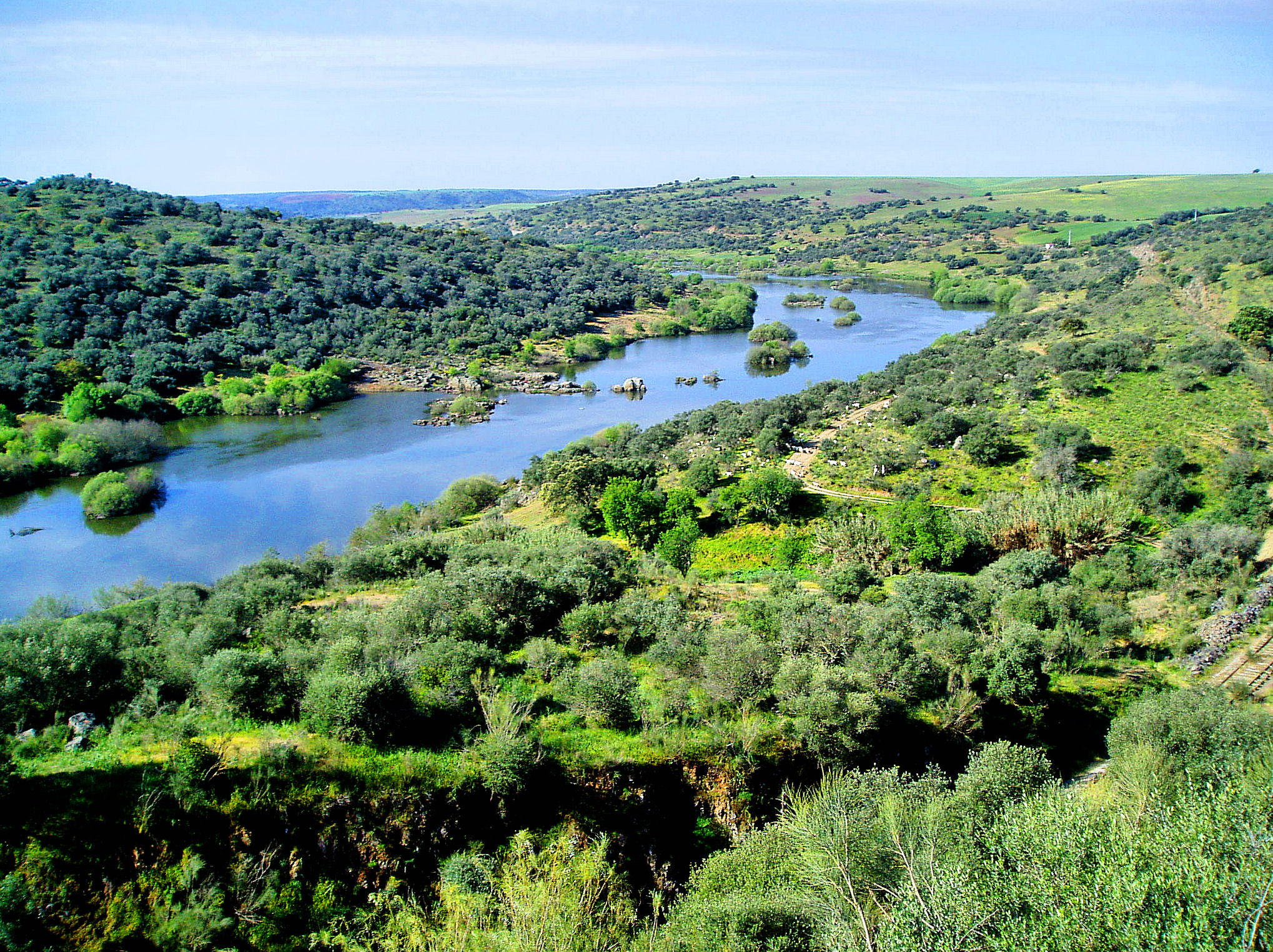
A view of the Guadiana River within the territory of Serpa

== Geography ==
Administratively, the municipality is divided into five civil parishes:

- Brinches
- Pias
- Serpa (Salvador e Santa Maria)
- Vila Nova de São Bento e Vale de Vargo
- Vila Verde de Ficalho

=== Climate ===
Climate data for Serpa, 1991-2021, altitude: 209 m (686 ft)
Month	Jan	Feb	Mar	Apr	May	Jun	Jul	Aug	Sep	Oct	Nov	Dec	Year
Average precipitation mm (inches)	49.3 (1.94)	35.8 (1.41)	48.2 (1.90)	50.3 (1.98)	33.6 (1.32)	7.6 (0.30)	1.6 (0.06)	3.2 (0.13)	22.9 (0.90)	61.9 (2.44)	58.9 (2.32)	76.2 (3.00)	449.5 (17.7)
Source: Portuguese Environment Agency

== Economy ==
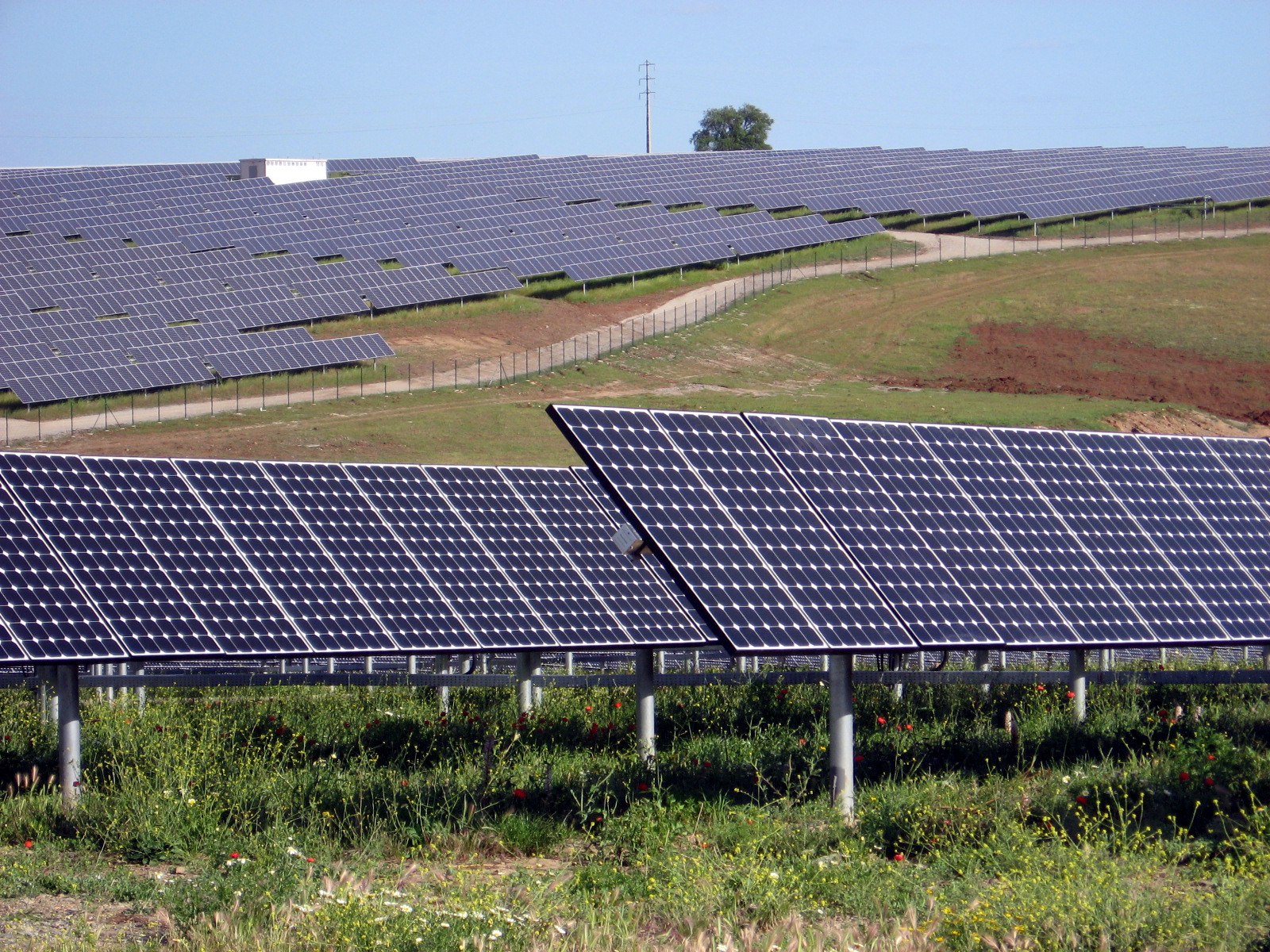
A view of the Serpa solar power plant

The area surrounding Serpa consists mostly of farms and cultivated lands of wheat, that have traditionally been the staple of the local economy, employing many people. Due to the area's strong agricultural reliance, the local population has traditionally been agrarian farmers and sheepherders. This has also resulted in the production of its spicy and strong-smelling cheeses, produced in the area and commercialized throughout Portugal. Slightly to the northeast, in the region of Pias, the area cultivates vineyards in order to produce local wines.

On 27 April 2006, GE Energy Financial Services, PowerLight Corporation and Catavento Lda. announced that they would build one of the world's largest solar photovoltaic power projects at a single site in Serpa. The 11-megawatt solar power station, comprising 52,000 photovoltaic modules, would be built in one of Europe's sunniest areas. The power station was inaugurated on 28 March 2007.

== Culture ==
Urban residents of Lisbon, Beja and other cities maintain country homes in Serpa, or take weekend breaks to the area as a result of Serpa's rural location and laid back lifestyle.

Local and regional specialties include Shepherd's Lamb Stew, a Clam and Pork dish and Sweet Potato Pastries.

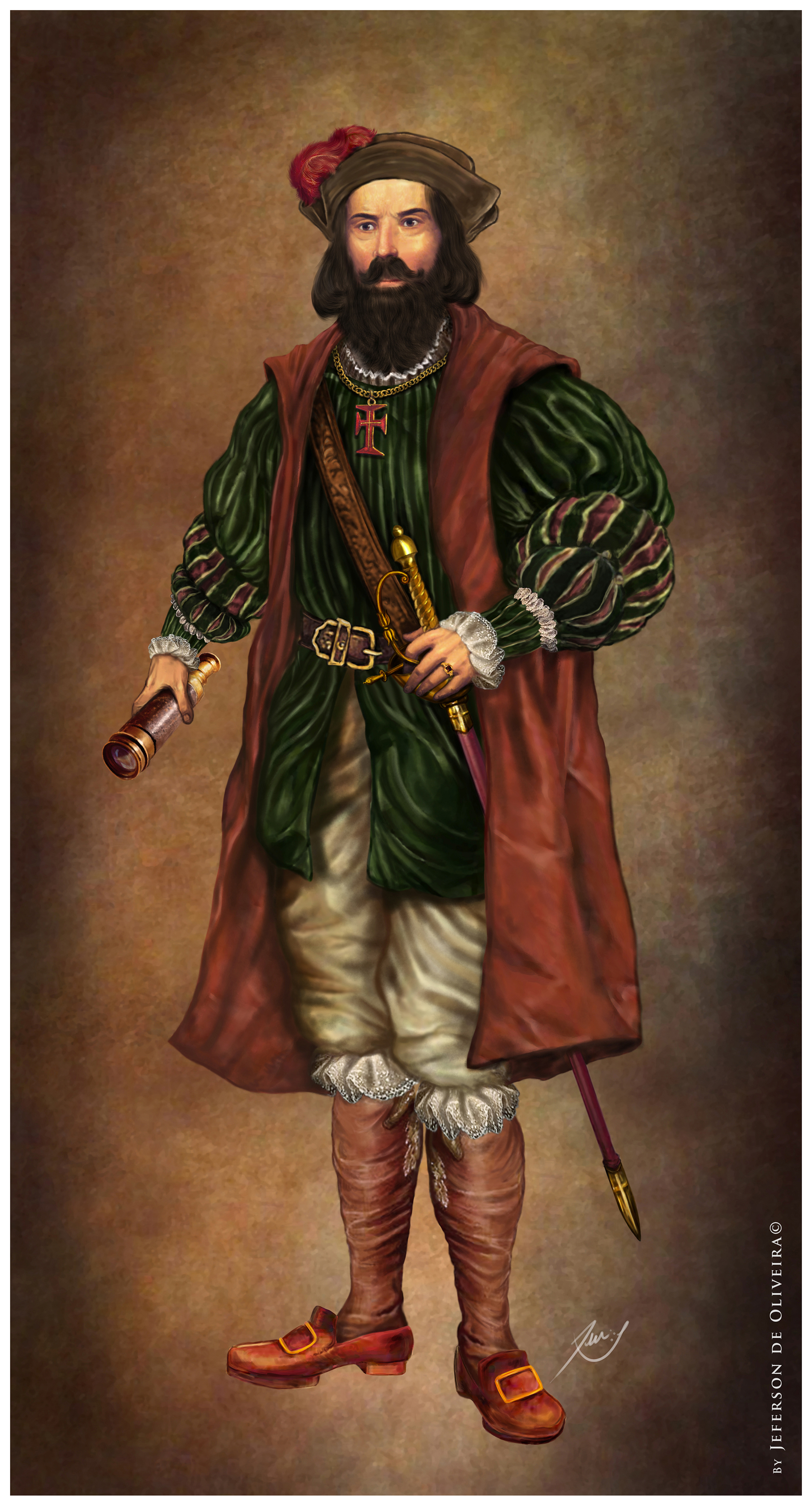
Vasco Fernandes Coutinho

== Notable people ==
- Jorge de Melo (1460-1534) a nobleman, member of the Court of John III of Portugal
- Vasco Fernandes Coutinho (1490–1561) a fidalgo and the first donatary of the Captaincy of Espírito Santo in Brazil
- Estêvão de Brito (c.1570–1641) a composer of polyphony
- José Correia da Serra (1750–1823) an abbot, polymath, philosopher, diplomat, politician and scientist
- Etelvina Lopes de Almeida (1916-2004) a writer, journalist, broadcaster and politician
- Nicolau Breyner (1940–2016) a playwright, director and actor.
- Filipe La Féria (born 1945) a director, producer and screenwriter for TV and theatre.
- Luísa Basto (born 1947) a political singer
- Nelo Vingada (born 1953) a football manager

== Sources and external links ==
- Watch & Clock Museum
- Planicie Dourada Tourist Region
- Photos from Serpa
- Costa, Carvalho da (1706), Corografia Portuguesa (in Portuguese) (Tomo II ed.), Lisbon, Portugal, p. 474
- Langres, Nicolau de, Desenhos e Plantas de todas as Praças do reyno de Portugal (in Portuguese) (BN Códice 7445 ed.), 1661
- Matos, Gastão de Melo de (1941), Nicolau de Langres e a sua Portugal (Monografia) (in Portuguese), Lisbon, Portugal
- Armas, Duarte de (1990), Livro das Fortalezas (in Portuguese), Lisbon, Portugal: INAPA
