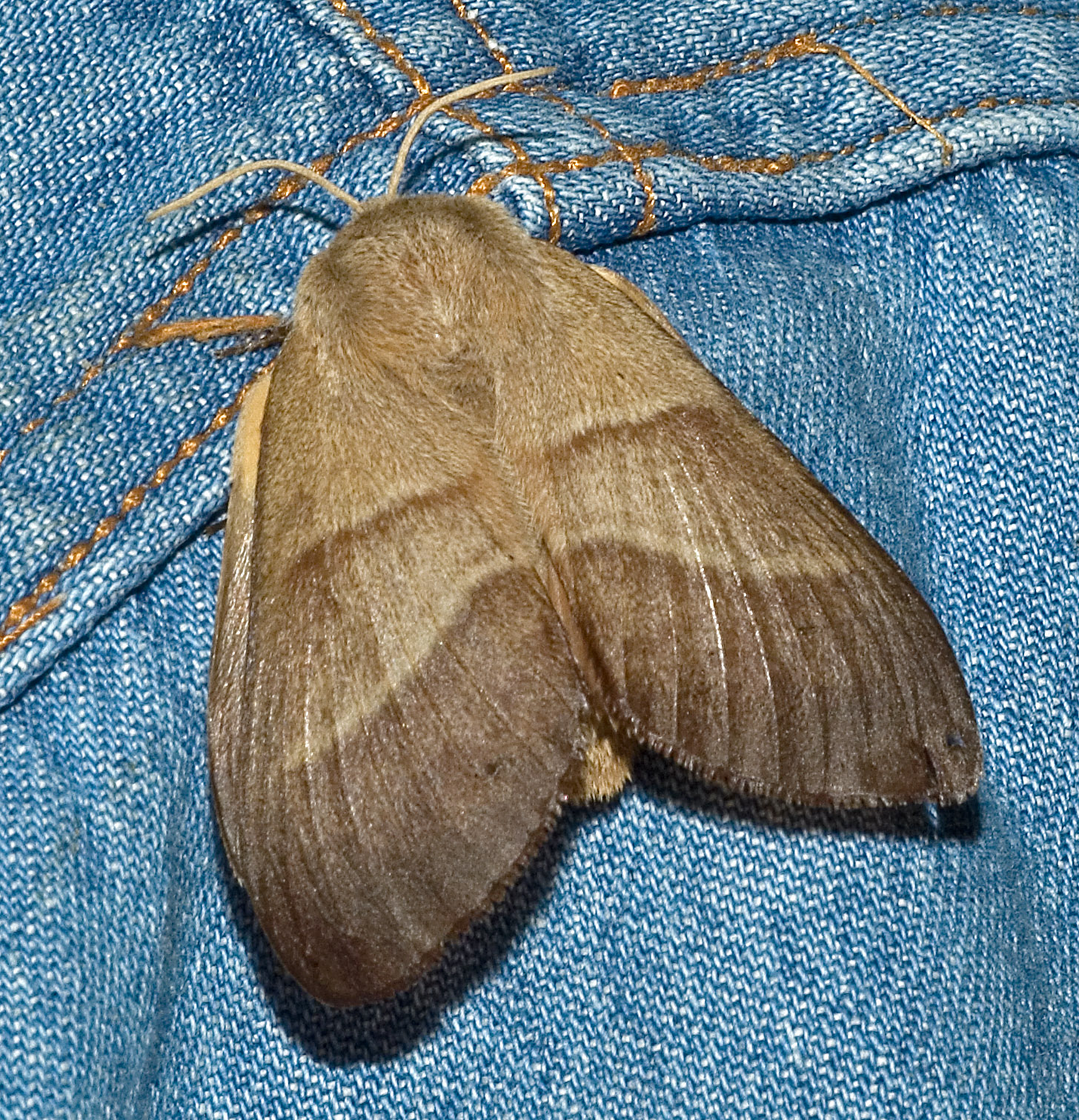
- Fox moth, Macrothylacia rubi

Scientific classification
- Kingdom: Animalia
- Phylum: Arthropoda
- Clade: Pancrustacea
- Class: Insecta
- Order: Lepidoptera
- Family: Lasiocampidae
- Subfamily: Lasiocampinae; Harris 1841

Genera
- About 65, see text

= Lasiocampinae =

Subfamily of moths

The Lasiocampinae are a subfamily of the moth family Lasiocampidae. The subfamily was described by Thaddeus William Harris in 1841.

== Genera ==
- Anadiasa Aurivillius, 1904
- Anastrolos Fletcher, 1982
- Apatelopteryx de Lajonquière, 1968
- Beralade Stephens, 1828
- Callopizoma de Lajonquière, 1972
- Caloecia Barnes & McDunnough, 1911
- Chilena Walker, 1855
- Chrysopsyche Butler, 1880
- Closterothrix (Mabille, 1879)
- Cosmotriche Hübner, 1820
- Cyclophragma Turner, 1911
- Dendrolimus Germar, 1812
- Dicogaster Barnes & McDunnough, 1911
- Dinometa Aurivillius, 1927
- Entometa Walker, 1855
- Eremaea Turner, 1915
- Ergolea Dumont, 1922
- Eriogaster (Germar, 1810)
- Eucraera Tams, 1930
- Europtera de Lajonquière, 1970
- Eutachyptera Barnes & McDunnough, 1912
- Euthrix (Meigen, 1830)
- Euwallengrenia D. S. Fletcher, 1968
- Gastromega Saalmüller, 1884
- Gastroplakaeis Möschler, 1887
- Genduara Walker, 1856
- Gloveria Packard, 1872
- Gonometa Walker, 1855
- Hypotrabala Holland, 1893
- Lasiocampa Schrank, 1802
- Lebeda Walker, 1855
- Lechriolepis Butler, 1880
- Leipoxais Holland, 1893
- Lenodora (Moore, 1883)
- Leptometa Aurivillius, 1927
- Macrothylacia Rambur, [1866]
- Malacosoma Hübner, [1820]
- Mimopacha Aurivillius, 1905
- Neurochyta Turner, 1918
- Ochanella Aurivillius, 1927
- Odontocheilopteryx Wallengren, 1860
- Odontopacha Aurivillius, 1909
- Opsirhina Walker, 1855
- Pachypasa Walker, 1855
- Pararguda Bethune-Baker, 1908
- Pellecebra Prozorov & Zolotuhin, 2012
- Pehria Strand, 1910
- Philotherma Möschler, 1887
- Phoberopsis de Lajonquière, 1972
- Phoenicladocera de Lajonquière, 1970
- Pinara Walker, 1855
- Porela Walker, 1855
- Psilogaster (Ochsenheimer, 1810)
- Pseudometa Aurivillius, 1901
- Quadrina Grote, 1881
- Sena Walker, 1862
- Somadasys (Gaede, 1932)
- Stenophatna Aurivillius, 1909
- Stoermeriana de Freina & Witt, 1983
- Streblote Hübner, [1820]
- Symphyta Turner, 1902
- Syrastrenopsis Grünberg, 1914
- Trabala Walker, 1856
- Trichiura Stephens, 1828
