= Eremaea =

Eremaea may refer to:

- Eremaea (moth), a genus of moths in the family Lasiocampinae
- Eremaea (plant), a genus of plants from Western Australia

== See also ==
- Eremaean province, a botanical region in Western Australia
