= Opisthodontia =

Opisthodontia may refer to:

- Opisthodontia (moth), a genus of moths in the family Lasiocampidae
- Opisthodontia (reptile), a clade of reptiles in the order Rhynchocephalia
