= Chilena (disambiguation) =

Chilena is a genus of moths native to South Asia.

Chilena may also refer to:

- Chilena (musical genre), a Mexican folk genre
- Bicycle kick, an association football strike known as chilena in some Spanish-speaking countries
