= Olyra =

Olyra may refer to:

- Olyra (fish), a genus of catfishes
- Olyra (plant), a genus of Bambusoideae
- Olyra (moth), a genus of moths that was replaced by Euwallengrenia
