= Quadrini =

Quadrini is an Italian surname. Notable people with the surname include:

- Daniele Quadrini (born 1980), Italian footballer
- Marco Quadrini (born 1979), Italian footballer

== See also ==
- Quadrina
