= Lenodora vittata =

Scientific classification
- Domain: Eukaryota
- Kingdom: Animalia
- Phylum: Arthropoda
- Class: Insecta
- Order: Lepidoptera
- Family: Lasiocampidae
- Genus: Lenodora
- Species: L. vittata

Binomial name
- Lenodora vittata Walker, 1855

Synonyms
- Lasiocampa vittata Walker, 1865; Miresa subcostalis Walker, 1865

Species of moth

Lenodora vittata is a moth of the family Lasiocampidae first described by Francis Walker in 1855. It is found in India and Sri Lanka.

== Biology ==
The caterpillar is a pest of rice. Brachymeria species are known parasitoids of the moth.
