= Europtera punctillata =

Scientific classification
- Kingdom: Animalia
- Phylum: Arthropoda
- Clade: Pancrustacea
- Class: Insecta
- Order: Lepidoptera
- Family: Lasiocampidae
- Genus: Europtera
- Species: E. punctillata

Binomial name
- Europtera punctillata (Saalmüller, 1884)

Synonyms
- Libethra punctillata Saalmüller, 1884; Europtera nigraluna De Lajonquière, 1970

Species of moth

Europtera punctillata is a species of Lasiocampidae moth native to Madagascar.

The wings have a cinnamon-brown colour. The males have a wingspan of 35–43 mm and the females of 62mm
