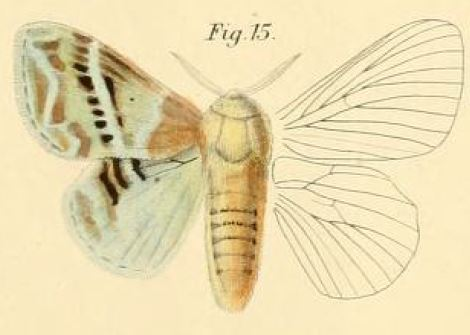
- Eucraera koellikerii

Scientific classification
- Domain: Eukaryota
- Kingdom: Animalia
- Phylum: Arthropoda
- Class: Insecta
- Order: Lepidoptera
- Family: Lasiocampidae
- Subfamily: Lasiocampinae
- Genus: Eucraera; Tams, 1930

Synonyms
- Ceratopacha Aurivillius, 1909

= Eucraera =

Genus of moths

Eucraera is a genus of moths in the family Lasiocampidae. The genus was first described by Tams in 1930.

== Species ==
- Eucraera aphrasta Tams, 1936
- Eucraera decora (Fawcett, 1915)
- Eucraera gemmata (Distant, 1897)
- Eucraera koellikerii (Dewitz, 1881)
- Eucraera magna (Aurivillius, 1909)
- Eucraera minor (Gaede, 1915)
- Eucraera salammbo (Vuillot, 1892)
