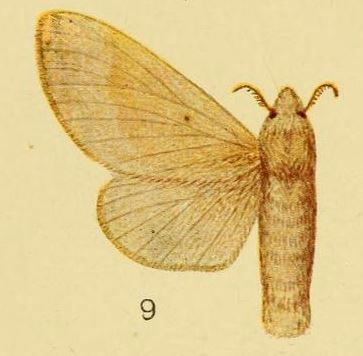

Scientific classification
- Domain: Eukaryota
- Kingdom: Animalia
- Phylum: Arthropoda
- Class: Insecta
- Order: Lepidoptera
- Family: Lasiocampidae
- Genus: Streblote
- Species: S. diluta

Binomial name
- Streblote diluta (Aurivillius, 1905)

Synonyms
- Taragama diluta Aurivillius, 1905; Streblote dysimata Tams, 1931

= Streblote diluta =

Species of moth

Streblote diluta is a species of moth in the family Lasiocampidae first described by Per Olof Christopher Aurivillius in 1905.

== Distribution ==
This species is known from Nigeria and Sudan or Chad

The larvae feed on Balanites aegyptiaca (Balanitaceae).

== Types ==
Taragama diluta and Streblote dysimata are the con-specific of the Streblota diluta, all found in the arid zones of Sudan. Only females of the species had been described; male of these species are still unknown. It is assumed that appearance of the males would be different according to pattern, color and size.
