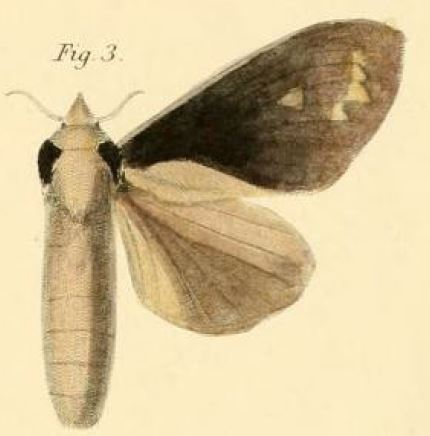
- Stoermeriana graberi

Scientific classification
- Kingdom: Animalia
- Phylum: Arthropoda
- Clade: Pancrustacea
- Class: Insecta
- Order: Lepidoptera
- Family: Lasiocampidae
- Subfamily: Lasiocampinae
- Genus: Stoermeriana de Freina & Witt, 1983

Type species
- Taragama regraguii Rungs, 1948

= Stoermeriana =

Genus of moths

Stoermeriana is a genus of moths in the family Lasiocampidae described by Josef J. de Freina and Thomas Joseph Witt in 1983.

== Species ==
Some species of this genus are:

- Stoermeriana abbayensis Rougeot, 1984
- Stoermeriana abyssinica (Aurivillius, 1909)
- Stoermeriana aculeata (Walker, 1865)
- Stoermeriana acuminata (Walker, 1865)
- Stoermeriana amblycalymma (Tams, 1936)
- Stoermeriana amphilecta (Tams, 1936)
- Stoermeriana basale (Walker, 1855)
- Stoermeriana callizona (Tams, 1931)
- Stoermeriana camerunicum (Aurivillius, 1902)
- Stoermeriana cervina (Aurivillius, 1927)
- Stoermeriana chavalloni Rougeot, 1984
- Stoermeriana coilotoma (Bethune-Baker, 1911)
- Stoermeriana collenettei (Tams, 1931)
- Stoermeriana congoense (Aurivillius, 1909)
- Stoermeriana craterum (Tams, 1929)
- Stoermeriana das (Hering, 1928)
- Stoermeriana directa (Mabille, 1893)
- Stoermeriana distinguenda (Aurivillius, 1905)
- Stoermeriana eccrita (D. S. Fletcher, 1968)
- Stoermeriana fuliginosa (Holland, 1893)
- Stoermeriana fusca (Aurivillius, 1905)
- Stoermeriana gamma (Aurivillius, 1909)
- Stoermeriana graberii (Dewitz, 1881)
- Stoermeriana laportei (Rougeot, 1977)
- Stoermeriana livida (Holland, 1893)
- Stoermeriana makomanum (Strand, 1912)
- Stoermeriana mirabilis (Distant, 1897)
- Stoermeriana muriniscolor Rougeot, 1984
- Stoermeriana nabatea de Freina, 2003
- Stoermeriana ocellata (Tams, 1929)
- Stoermeriana oinopa (Tams, 1936)
- Stoermeriana omana de Freina & Witt, 1988
- Stoermeriana pachyla (Tams, 1936)
- Stoermeriana pamphenges (Tams, 1936)
- Stoermeriana pygmaeorum (Tams, 1929)
- Stoermeriana regraguii (Rungs, 1950)
- Stoermeriana saanayetae Rougeot, 1984
- Stoermeriana singulare (Aurivillius, 1893)
- Stoermeriana sjostedti (Aurivillius, 1902)
- Stoermeriana sminthocara (Tams, 1936)
- Stoermeriana superba (Aurivillius, 1909)
- Stoermeriana tamsi (Rougeot, 1977)
- Stoermeriana tessmanni (Strand, 1912)
- Stoermeriana thomensis (Talbot, 1929)
- Stoermeriana versicolora Kühne, 2008
- Stoermeriana viettei (Rougeot, 1977)
- Stoermeriana vinacea (Tams, 1929)
