= Phoberopsis =

Scientific classification
- Kingdom: Animalia
- Phylum: Arthropoda
- Clade: Pancrustacea
- Class: Insecta
- Order: Lepidoptera
- Family: Lasiocampidae
- Subfamily: Lasiocampinae
- Genus: Phoberopsis; Lajonquière, 1972
- Species: P. ferox

Binomial name
- Phoberopsis ferox (Kenrick, 1914)

Synonyms
- Gonometa ferox Kenrick, 1914

Genus of moths

Phoberopsis is a monotypic genus of moth in the family Lasiocampidae first described by Yves de Lajonquière in 1972. Its only species, Phoberopsis ferox, described by George Hamilton Kenrick in 1914, is native to Madagascar.

The male has a wingspan of 70 mm. Its head, antennae, palpi and the front of its thorax are fiery orange. The legs and thorax are black. The abdomen is black ringed with pale orange. The wings are dull black without markings.
