= Apatelopteryx =

Scientific classification
- Kingdom: Animalia
- Phylum: Arthropoda
- Clade: Pancrustacea
- Class: Insecta
- Order: Lepidoptera
- Family: Lasiocampidae
- Subfamily: Lasiocampinae
- Genus: Apatelopteryx de Lajonquière, 1968

Genus of moths

Apatelopteryx is a genus of moths in the family Lasiocampidae. The genus was erected by Yves de Lajonquière in 1968.

== Species ==
Some species of this genus are:

- Apatelopteryx deceptrix (Kenrick, 1914)
- Apatelopteryx meloui
- Apatelopteryx pentheter De Lajonquière, 1968
- Apatelopteryx phenax De Lajonquière, 1968
