= Leipoxais batesi =

Scientific classification
- Domain: Eukaryota
- Kingdom: Animalia
- Phylum: Arthropoda
- Class: Insecta
- Order: Lepidoptera
- Family: Lasiocampidae
- Genus: Leipoxais
- Species: L. batesi

Binomial name
- Leipoxais batesi Bethune-Baker, 1927

Synonyms
- Leipoxais nervosa Berio, 1937; Leipoxais typodes Tams, 1931

Species of moth

Leipoxais batesi is a moth in the family Lasiocampidae. It was described by George Thomas Bethune-Baker in 1927. It is found in Cameroon, the Democratic Republic of the Congo, Kenya and Uganda.

The wingspan is about 44 mm. The forewings are reddish brown, with a subbasal ochreous stripe, very irregularly and strongly dentate in the cell. There is a small dark spot in the cell and a postmedian broadish, irregular, ochreous stripe, through which a highly crenulate dark red line runs obliquely. There is also a very irregular, somewhat crenulate, broken, ochreous submarginal stripe. All these stripes have a more or less fine dark external edging. The termen is finely dark reddish, with paler fringes. The hindwings are ochreous, with the termen and costa broadly reddish brown, the latter with a crenulate ochreous dash. The basal area is pinkish ochreous.
