= Miresa sibinoides =

Scientific classification
- Domain: Eukaryota
- Kingdom: Animalia
- Phylum: Arthropoda
- Class: Insecta
- Order: Lepidoptera
- Family: Limacodidae
- Genus: Miresa
- Species: M. sibinoides

Binomial name
- Miresa sibinoides Hering, 1931

Species of moth

Miresa sibinoides is a moth of the family Limacodidae first described by Hering in 1931. It is found in Sri Lanka and India.
