= Miresa albipuncta =

Scientific classification
- Domain: Eukaryota
- Kingdom: Animalia
- Phylum: Arthropoda
- Class: Insecta
- Order: Lepidoptera
- Family: Limacodidae
- Genus: Miresa
- Species: M. albipuncta

Binomial name
- Miresa albipuncta Herrich-Schäffer, 1854

Synonyms
- Nyssia albipuncta Herrich-Schäffer, 1854

Species of moth

Miresa albipuncta is a moth of the family Limacodidae first described by Gottlieb August Wilhelm Herrich-Schäffer in 1854. It is found in Sri Lanka, India and Nepal.

Adult wingspan is 40 mm. Palpi not reaching beyond frontal tuft. Male antennae of male half-serrated distally. Mid and hind tibiae have terminal spur pairs. Head yellowish. Thorax fulvous yellow, whereas abdomen ochreous fulvous. Forewings reddish brown. A silvery-white spot found beyond the lower angle of cell. An ill-defined faint silver postmedial line present. Hindwings ochreous. Underside also ochreous. Both wings are suffused with reddish brown towards costa.

Eggs hatch 2 to 5 days after laying, usually between July and October. The caterpillar undergoes five instars and completes the stage after 18–32 days. Then it undergo 2–3 days of prepupal stage and then 7–14 days of pupal stage. Emergence of adults was observed in July. The caterpillar is a pest on Diospyros melanoxylon.
