= Callopizoma =

Scientific classification
- Domain: Eukaryota
- Kingdom: Animalia
- Phylum: Arthropoda
- Class: Insecta
- Order: Lepidoptera
- Family: Lasiocampidae
- Subfamily: Lasiocampinae
- Genus: Callopizoma de Lajonquière, 1972

Genus of moths

Callopizoma is a genus of moths in the family Lasiocampidae. The genus was erected by Yves de Lajonquière in 1972. It is known to be found in Madagascar.

== Species ==
Some species of this genus are:

- Callopizoma malgassica (Kenrick, 1914)
- Callopizoma micans De Lajonquière, 1972
