= Ochanella =

Ochanella hova

Scientific classification
- Kingdom: Animalia
- Phylum: Arthropoda
- Class: Insecta
- Order: Lepidoptera
- Family: Lasiocampidae
- Subfamily: Lasiocampinae
- Genus: Ochanella; Aurivillius, 1927
- Species: O. hova

Binomial name
- Ochanella hova (Butler, 1882)

Synonyms
- Ocha hova Butler, 1882

Genus of moths

Ochanella is a genus of moths in the family Lasiocampidae from Madagascar. This is a monotypic genus: its only species is Ochanella hova.

== Subspecies ==
- Ochanella hova hova (Butler, 1882)
- Ochanella hova tsaratanensis De Lajonquière, 1970
