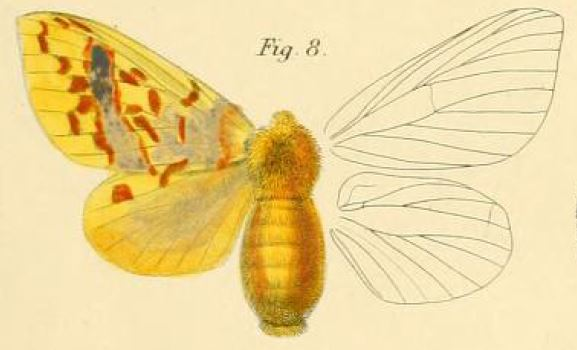

Scientific classification
- Domain: Eukaryota
- Kingdom: Animalia
- Phylum: Arthropoda
- Class: Insecta
- Order: Lepidoptera
- Family: Lasiocampidae
- Subfamily: Lasiocampinae
- Genus: Chrysopsyche; Butler, 1880

Synonyms
- Protogenes Saalmüller, 1884; Trabaloides Kirby, 1892

= Chrysopsyche =

Genus of moths

Chrysopsyche is a genus of moths in the family Lasiocampidae. The genus was erected by Arthur Gardiner Butler in 1880.

== Species ==
Some species of this genus are:

- Chrysopsyche albicilia Bethune-Baker, 1911
- Chrysopsyche antennifera Strand, 1912
- Chrysopsyche bivittata Aurivillius, 1927
- Chrysopsyche imparilis Aurivillius, 1905
- Chrysopsyche jefferyi Tams, 1926
- Chrysopsyche lamani Aurivillius, 1906
- Chrysopsyche lutulenta Tams, 1923
- Chrysopsyche mirifica (Butler, 1878)
- Chrysopsyche pauliani Viette, 1962
- Chrysopsyche pyriplecta Tams, 1930
- Chrysopsyche pyrodes Tams, 1931
- Chrysopsyche viridescens (Holland, 1893)
- Chrysopsyche wilsoni Tams, 1928
- Chrysopsyche yaundae Bethune-Baker, 1927
