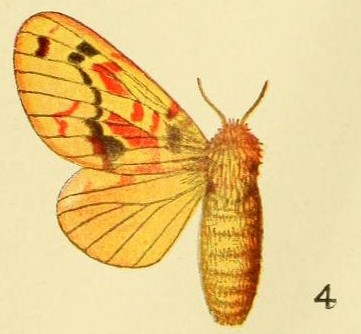

Scientific classification
- Kingdom: Animalia
- Phylum: Arthropoda
- Class: Insecta
- Order: Lepidoptera
- Family: Lasiocampidae
- Genus: Chrysopsyche
- Species: C. lamani

Binomial name
- Chrysopsyche lamani Aurivillius, 1906

= Chrysopsyche lamani =

Species of moth

Chrysopsyche lamani is a moth of the family Lasiocampidae first described by Per Olof Christopher Aurivillius in 1906. It is found in the Democratic Republic of the Congo.
