= Eucraera magna =

Scientific classification
- Domain: Eukaryota
- Kingdom: Animalia
- Phylum: Arthropoda
- Class: Insecta
- Order: Lepidoptera
- Family: Lasiocampidae
- Genus: Eucraera
- Species: E. magna

Binomial name
- Eucraera magna (Aurivillius, 1909)

Synonyms
- Ceratopacha magna Aurivillius, 1909

Species of moth

Eucraera magna is a species of Lasiocampidae moth, it is known from Sierra Leone and Eritrea.

== Taxonomy ==
Some authors also count Eucraera minor (Gaede, 1915) as a synonym of Eucraera magna.
