= Miresa argentifera =

Scientific classification
- Kingdom: Animalia
- Phylum: Arthropoda
- Class: Insecta
- Order: Lepidoptera
- Family: Limacodidae
- Genus: Miresa
- Species: M. argentifera

Binomial name
- Miresa argentifera Walker, 1855

Species of moth

Miresa argentifera is a moth of the family Limacodidae first described by Francis Walker in 1855. It is found in Sri Lanka.

The former subspecies Miresa argentifera kwantungensis Hering, 1931 was lifted to full species status in 2011.
