= Miresa gilba =

Scientific classification
- Kingdom: Animalia
- Phylum: Arthropoda
- Class: Insecta
- Order: Lepidoptera
- Family: Limacodidae
- Genus: Miresa
- Species: M. gilba

Binomial name
- Miresa gilba Karsch, 1899

Species of moth

Miresa gilba is a moth species in the family of Limacodidae found in Ghana. The type provided from Kete Kratje.

This species has a wingspan of 28mm.
