= Chrysopsyche pauliani =

Scientific classification
- Kingdom: Animalia
- Phylum: Arthropoda
- Class: Insecta
- Order: Lepidoptera
- Family: Lasiocampidae
- Genus: Chrysopsyche
- Species: C. pauliani

Binomial name
- Chrysopsyche pauliani Viette, 1962

Species of moth

Chrysopsyche pauliani is a moth of the family Lasiocampidae first described by Pierre Viette in 1962. It is found in Madagascar.
