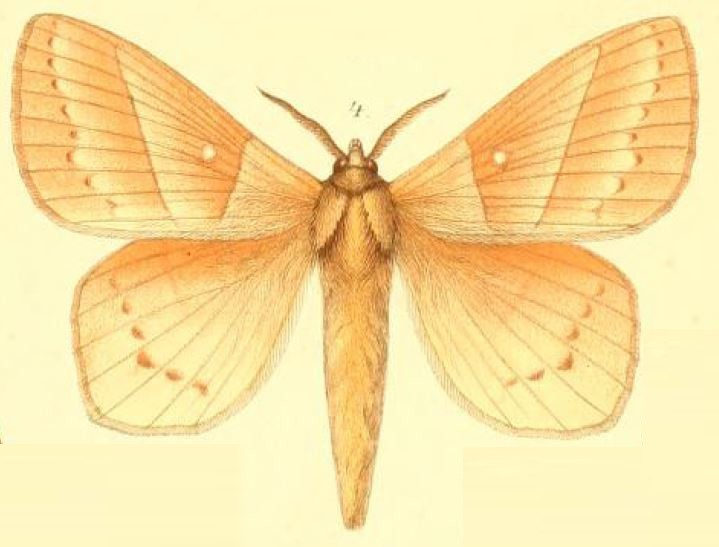

Scientific classification
- Domain: Eukaryota
- Kingdom: Animalia
- Phylum: Arthropoda
- Class: Insecta
- Order: Lepidoptera
- Family: Lasiocampidae
- Subfamily: Lasiocampinae
- Genus: Philotherma; Möschler, 1887

Type species
- Philotherma jacchus Möschler, 1887

Synonyms
- Mariaeia Dufrane, 1945

= Philotherma =

Genus of moths

Philotherma is a genus of moths in the family Lasiocampidae. The genus was erected by Heinrich Benno Möschler in 1887.

== Species ==
- Philotherma apithana Hering, 1928
- Philotherma brunnea (Aurivillius, 1909)
- Philotherma clara Bethune-Baker, 1908
- Philotherma fusca Aurivillius, 1909
- Philotherma fuscescens Hampson, 1910
- Philotherma goliath (Viette, 1962)
- Philotherma grisea Aurivillius, 1915
- Philotherma heringi Szent-Ivány, 1942
- Philotherma jacchus Möschler, 1887
- Philotherma kittenbergeri Szent-Ivány, 1942
- Philotherma leucocyma (Hampson, 1909)
- Philotherma media Aurivillius, 1909
- Philotherma melambela Tams, 1936
- Philotherma rectilinea Strand, 1912
- Philotherma rennei (Dewitz, 1881)
- Philotherma rosa (Druce, 1887)
- Philotherma rufescens Wichgraf, 1921
- Philotherma simplex Wichgraf, 1914
- Philotherma sordida Aurivillius, 1905
- Philotherma spargata (Holland, 1893)
- Philotherma tandoensis Bethune-Baker, 1927
- Philotherma thoracica (Butler, 1895)
- Philotherma unicolor (Walker, 1855)
- Philotherma vulpecula Strand, 1918
