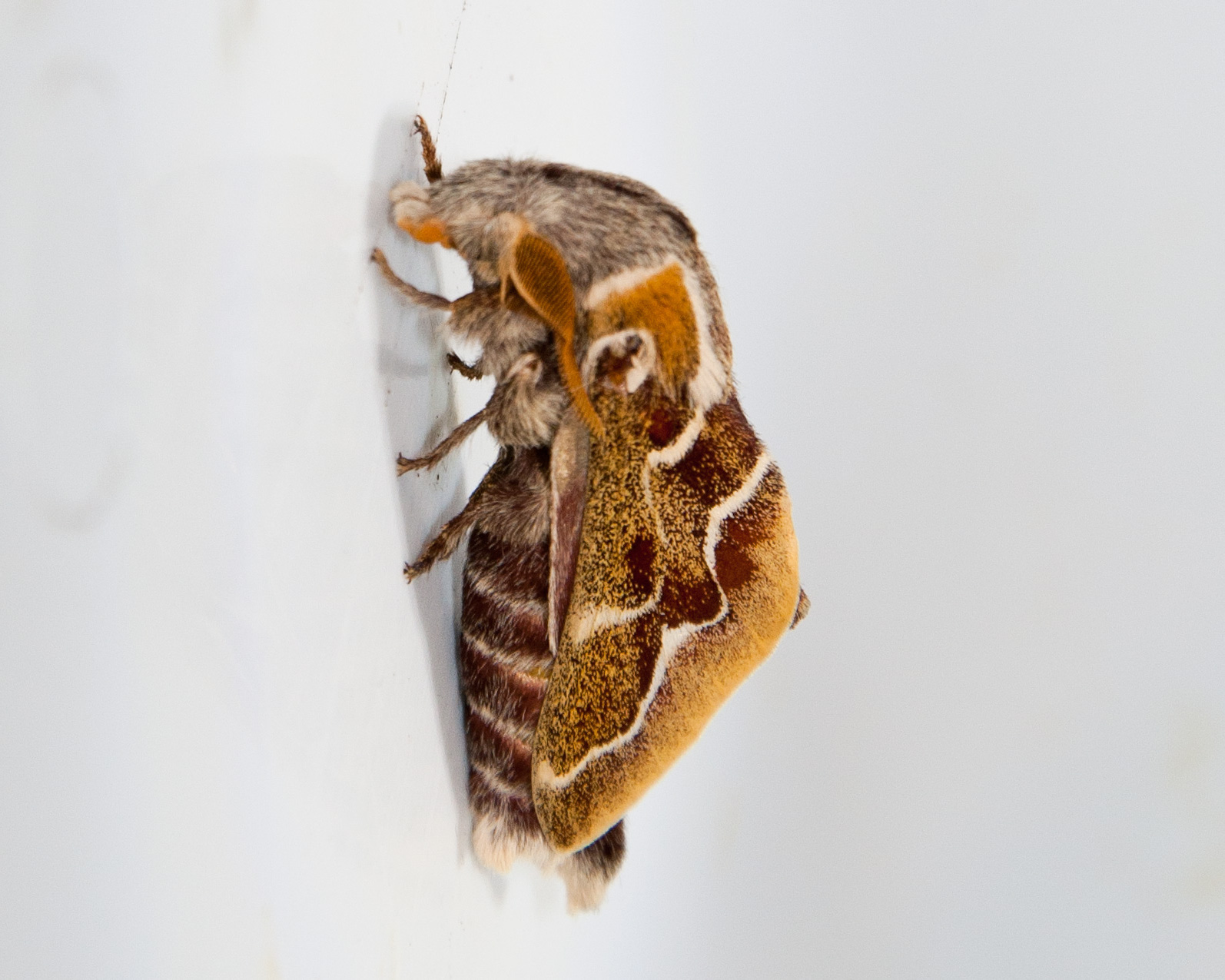
- Side view, wings fully developed

Scientific classification
- Kingdom: Animalia
- Phylum: Arthropoda
- Class: Insecta
- Order: Lepidoptera
- Family: Lasiocampidae
- Genus: Streblote
- Species: S. cristata

Binomial name
- Streblote cristata (Stoll, 1782)

Synonyms
- Phaleana Bombyx cristata Stoll, 1782

= Streblote cristata =

Species of moth

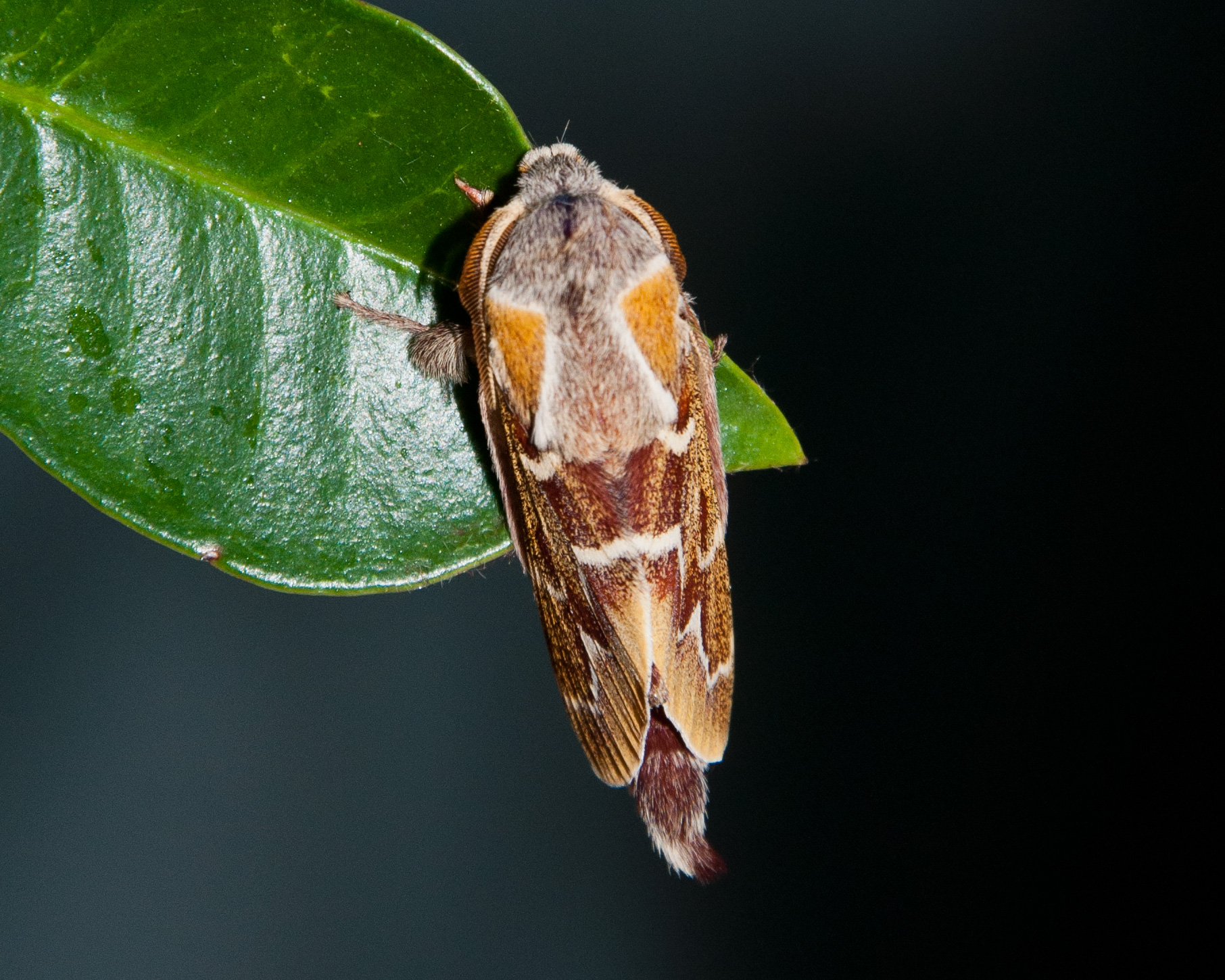
Top view

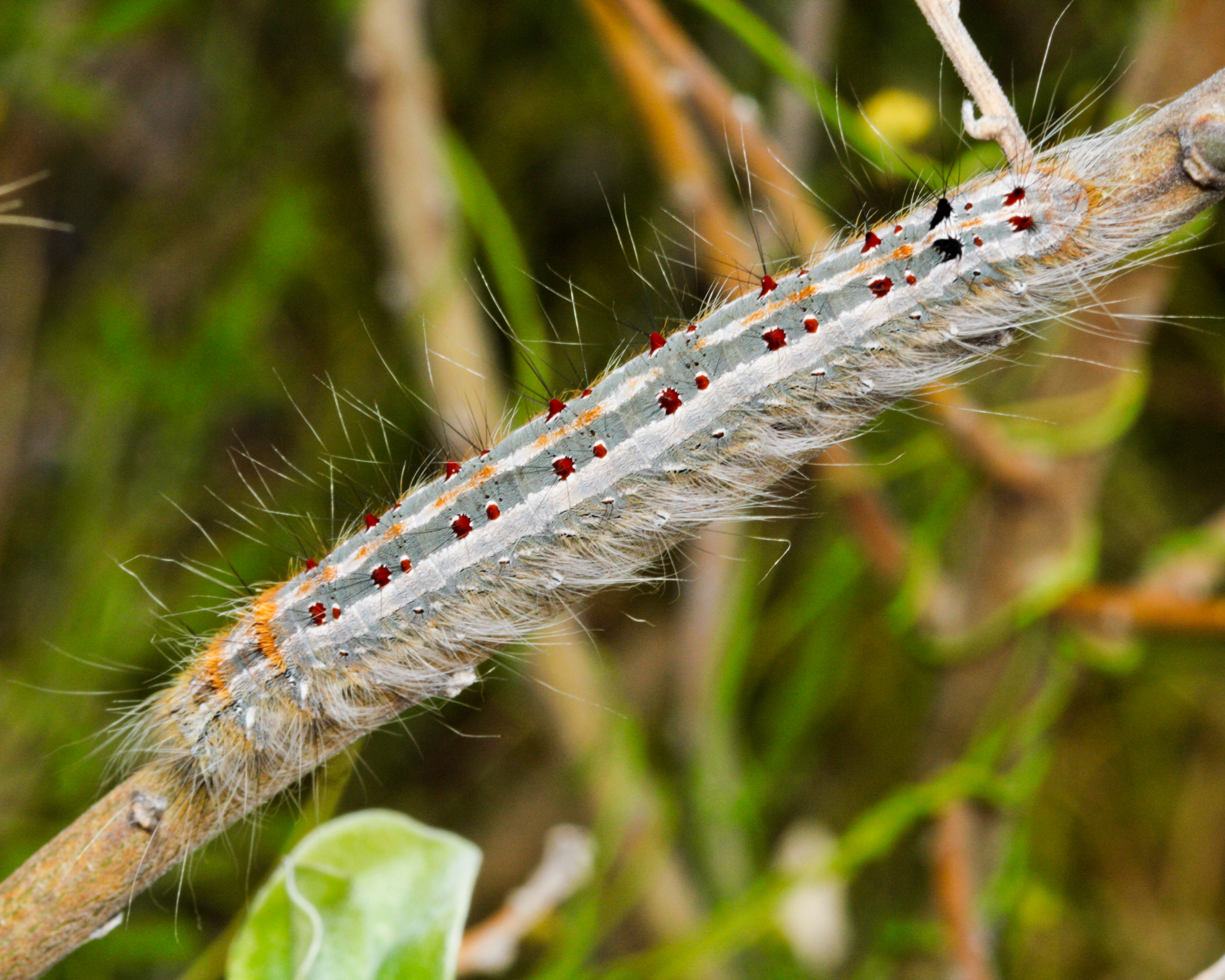
Final instar larva

Streblote cristata is a species of moth in the family Lasiocampidae, the so-called eggars, snout moths or lappet moths. The species was first described by Caspar Stoll in 1782.

Streblote cristata occurs in the fynbos of the far south Western Cape Province of South Africa, where it has been observed on fynbos species such as members of the Podalyria and Erica genera. It also has been found on domestic thyme. Such a varied range of food plants, but without much tendency for any single larva to migrate to a different species during its development, is common among the Lasiocampidae.
