= Chrysopsyche imparilis =

Scientific classification
- Kingdom: Animalia
- Phylum: Arthropoda
- Class: Insecta
- Order: Lepidoptera
- Family: Lasiocampidae
- Genus: Chrysopsyche
- Species: C. imparilis

Binomial name
- Chrysopsyche imparilis Aurivillius, 1905

Synonyms
- Chrysopsyche ladburyi Bethune-Baker, 1911

Species of moth

Chrysopsyche imparilis is a moth of the family Lasiocampidae first described by Per Olof Christopher Aurivillius in 1905. It is found in Nigeria, Senegal and South Africa.

== Biology ==
Food plants of this species are Terminalia species (Combretaceae), Combretum species and Gossypium.
