= Sena (moth) =

Scientific classification
- Kingdom: Animalia
- Phylum: Arthropoda
- Class: Insecta
- Order: Lepidoptera
- Family: Lasiocampidae
- Subfamily: Lasiocampinae
- Genus: Sena; Walker, 1862

Genus of moths

Sena is a genus of moths belonging to the family Lasiocampidae.

The species of this genus are found in Africa.

Species:

- Sena augustasi Zolotuhin, Saldaitis & Ivinskis, 2009
- Sena breyeri Aurivillius, 1922
- Sena cardinalli Tams, 1931
- Sena cuneata Brandt, 1938
- Sena donaldsoni Holland & Smith, 1901
- Sena levenna Wallengren, 1876
- Sena mendax Berio, 1939
- Sena meyi Zolotuhin, 2007
- Sena oberthueri Lucas, 1909
- Sena oberthuri (Lucas D., 1909)
- Sena parva Aurivillius, 1921
- Sena poecila Hering, 1932
- Sena prompta Walker, 1855
- Sena proxima Staudinger, 1894
- Sena punctulata Aurivillius, 1914
- Sena quirimbo Tams, 1936
- Sena scotti Tams, 1931
- Sena sikarama Ebert, 1969
- Sena strigifascia Hampson, 1909
- Sena zolotuhini Hacker, 2016
