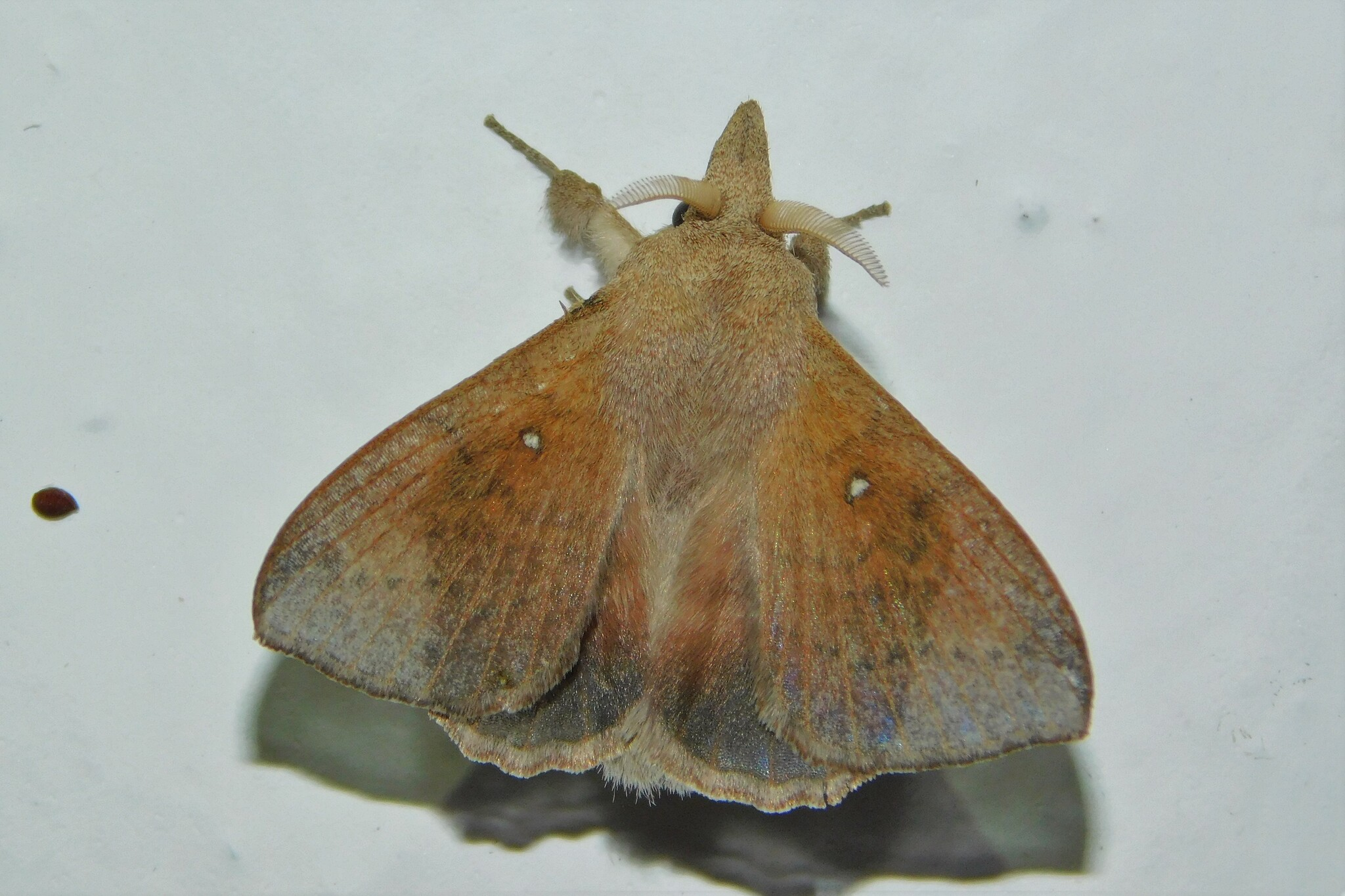
- Leipoxais peraffinis

Scientific classification
- Domain: Eukaryota
- Kingdom: Animalia
- Phylum: Arthropoda
- Class: Insecta
- Order: Lepidoptera
- Family: Lasiocampidae
- Subfamily: Lasiocampinae
- Genus: Leipoxais; Holland, 1893

Synonyms
- Leipaxis Bethune-Baker, 1911

= Leipoxais =

Genus of moths

Leipoxais is a genus of moths in the family Lasiocampidae. The genus was erected by William Jacob Holland in 1893.

== Species ==
Based on Afromoths:

- Leipoxais acharis Hering, 1928
- Leipoxais adoxa Hering, 1928
- Leipoxais batesi Bethune-Baker, 1927
- Leipoxais compsotes Tams, 1937
- Leipoxais directa (Walker, 1865)
- Leipoxais dives Aurivillius, 1915
- Leipoxais dolichoprygma Tams, 1931
- Leipoxais emarginata Aurivillius, 1911
- Leipoxais fuscofasciata Aurivillius, 1909
- Leipoxais haematidea (Snellen, 1872)
- Leipoxais humfreyi Aurivillius, 1915
- Leipoxais ituria Bethune-Baker, 1909
- Leipoxais lipophemisma Tams, 1929
- Leipoxais major Holland, 1893
- Leipoxais makomona Strand, 1912
- Leipoxais manica Hering, 1928
- Leipoxais marginepunctata Holland, 1893
- Leipoxais miara Hering, 1928
- Leipoxais obscura Aurivillius, 1909
- Leipoxais peraffinis Holland, 1893
- Leipoxais proboscidea (Guérin-Méneville, 1832)
- Leipoxais proboscifera Strand, 1912
- Leipoxais regularis Strand, 1912
- Leipoxais roxana (Fawcett, 1915)
- Leipoxais rufobrunnea Strand, 1912
- Leipoxais siccifolia Aurivillius, 1902
- Leipoxais strandi Aurivillius, 1927
- Leipoxais tamsi Fletcher D. S., 1968
- Leipoxais tolmera Tams, 1929
