= Callopizoma malgassica =

Scientific classification
- Kingdom: Animalia
- Phylum: Arthropoda
- Class: Insecta
- Order: Lepidoptera
- Family: Lasiocampidae
- Genus: Callopizoma
- Species: C. malgassica

Binomial name
- Callopizoma malgassica (Kenrick, 1914)

Synonyms
- Gastropacha malgassica Kenrick, 1914

Species of moth

Callopizoma malgassica is a species of Lasiocampidae moth native to Madagascar.

They have a wingspan of 66 mm.
