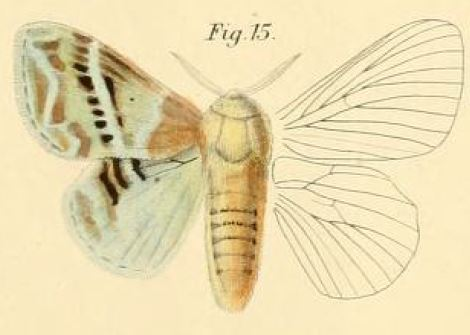

Scientific classification
- Domain: Eukaryota
- Kingdom: Animalia
- Phylum: Arthropoda
- Class: Insecta
- Order: Lepidoptera
- Family: Lasiocampidae
- Genus: Eucraera
- Species: E. koellikerii

Binomial name
- Eucraera koellikerii (Dewitz, 1881)

Synonyms
- Lasiocampa köllikerii Drewitz,

= Eucraera koellikerii =

Species of moth

Eucraera koellikerii is a species of Lasiocampidae moth found in Angola, the Congo, Equatorial Guinea, Kenya, Mozambique, South Africa and Tanzania.
