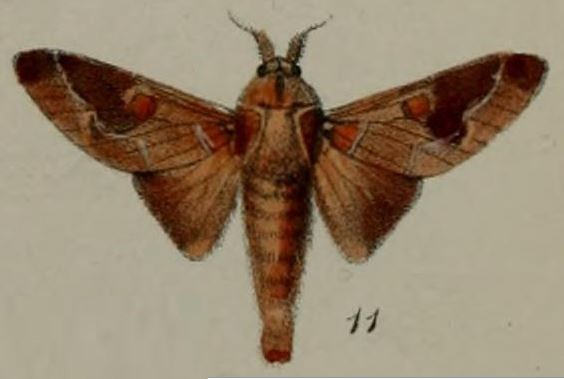

Scientific classification
- Domain: Eukaryota
- Kingdom: Animalia
- Phylum: Arthropoda
- Class: Insecta
- Order: Lepidoptera
- Family: Lasiocampidae
- Genus: Streblote
- Species: S. polydora

Binomial name
- Streblote polydora (H. Druce, 1887)

Synonyms
- Megasoma polydora H. Druce, 1887

= Streblote polydora =

Species of moth

Streblote polydora is a moth of the family Lasiocampidae first described by Herbert Druce in 1887. It is found in Angola, the Democratic Republic of the Congo, Eritrea, Mozambique, South Africa, Tanzania and Zimbabwe.

The larvae feed on Piliostigma thonningii.
