= Opisthodontia (moth) =

Scientific classification
- Kingdom: Animalia
- Phylum: Arthropoda
- Clade: Pancrustacea
- Class: Insecta
- Order: Lepidoptera
- Family: Lasiocampidae
- Subfamily: Lasiocampinae
- Tribe: Gastropachini
- Genus: Opisthodontia; Aurivillius, 1895

Genus of moths

Opisthodontia is a genus of moths in the family Lasiocampidae. The genus was erected by Per Olof Christopher Aurivillius in 1895.

== Species ==
- Opisthodontia afroio Zolotuhin & Prozorov, 2010
- Opisthodontia arnoldi Aurivillius, 1908
- Opisthodontia avinoffi Tams, 1929
- Opisthodontia axividia Zolotuhin & Prozorov, 2010
- Opisthodontia budamara Zolotuhin & Prozorov, 2010
- Opisthodontia cardinalli Tams, 1926
- Opisthodontia cymographa Hampson, 1910
- Opisthodontia dannfelti Aurivillius, 1895
- Opisthodontia dentata Aurivillius, 1900
- Opisthodontia denticulata Romieux, 1943
- Opisthodontia diva Zolotuhin & Prozorov, 2010
- Opisthodontia flavipicta Tams, 1929
- Opisthodontia haigi Tams, 1935
- Opisthodontia hollandi Tams, 1929
- Opisthodontia jordani Tams, 1936
- Opisthodontia kahli Tams, 1929
- Opisthodontia micha Druce, 1899
- Opisthodontia obscura Hering, 1941
- Opisthodontia ochrosticta Kiriakoff, 1963
- Opisthodontia pygmy Zolotuhin & Prozorov, 2010
- Opisthodontia rothschildi Tams, 1936
- Opisthodontia rotundata Berio, 1937
- Opisthodontia sidha Zolotuhin & Prozorov, 2010
- Opisthodontia sonithella Zolotuhin & Prozorov, 2010
- Opisthodontia spodopasta Tams, 1931
- Opisthodontia superba Aurivillius, 1915
- Opisthodontia supramalis Zolotuhin & Prozorov, 2010
- Opisthodontia tamsi Kiriakoff, 1963
- Opisthodontia tessmanni Hering, 1928
- Opisthodontia varezhka Zolotuhin & Prozorov, 2010
- Opisthodontia vensani Zolotuhin & Prozorov, 2010
