= Miresa habenichti =

Scientific classification
- Domain: Eukaryota
- Kingdom: Animalia
- Phylum: Arthropoda
- Class: Insecta
- Order: Lepidoptera
- Family: Limacodidae
- Genus: Miresa
- Species: M. habenichti

Binomial name
- Miresa habenichti (Wichgraf, 1913)

Synonyms
- Ctenolita habenichti Wichgraf, 1913

Species of moth

Miresa habenichti is a moth species in the family of Limacodidae found in Mozambique.

This species has a wingspan of 34mm and a body length of 18mm and was named after its collector Mr. Habenicht from Delagoa Bay.
