= Europtera pandani =

Scientific classification
- Kingdom: Animalia
- Phylum: Arthropoda
- Class: Insecta
- Order: Lepidoptera
- Family: Lasiocampidae
- Genus: Europtera
- Species: E. pandani

Binomial name
- Europtera pandani De Lajonquière, 1972

Species of moth

Europtera pandani is a species of Lasiocampidae moth native to Madagascar.
