= Dinometa =

Scientific classification
- Domain: Eukaryota
- Kingdom: Animalia
- Phylum: Arthropoda
- Class: Insecta
- Order: Lepidoptera
- Family: Lasiocampidae
- Subfamily: Lasiocampinae
- Genus: Dinometa; Aurivillius, 1927

Genus of moths

Dinometa is an Afrotropical genus of moths in the family Lasiocampidae. It was erected by Per Olof Christopher Aurivillius in 1927, containing at the time only the species Dinometa maputuana, originally described by Wichgraf in 1906 as Gastroplakaeis maputuana. Two additional species, Dinometa abigailae and Dinometa ethani, were described in 2024 by Alexey Prozorov et al.

== Species ==
- Dinometa abigailae Prozorov et al., 2024 – Kenya, Tanzania
- Dinometa ethani Prozorov et al., 2024 – Tanzania
- Dinometa maputuana (Wichgraf, 1906) – Mozambique, South Africa and Tanzania.
