= Beralade obliquata =

Scientific classification
- Kingdom: Animalia
- Phylum: Arthropoda
- Class: Insecta
- Order: Lepidoptera
- Family: Lasiocampidae
- Genus: Beralade
- Species: B. obliquata

Binomial name
- Beralade obliquata (Klug, 1830)

Species of moth

Beralade obliquata is a moth of the family Lasiocampidae first described by Johann Christoph Friedrich Klug in 1830. It is found from Morocco to Egypt and Sudan.

The wingspan is 15–18 mm. The moths are on wing from February to April and from April to September in two generations.

The larvae feed on Acacia raddiana.

== Subspecies ==
- P. b. candens
- P. b. bouillonae
