= Symphyta (moth) =

Scientific classification
- Domain: Eukaryota
- Kingdom: Animalia
- Phylum: Arthropoda
- Class: Insecta
- Order: Lepidoptera
- Family: Lasiocampidae
- Subfamily: Lasiocampinae
- Genus: Symphyta; Turner, 1902

Genus of moths

Symphyta is a genus of moths in the family Lasiocampidae. The genus was erected by Alfred Jefferis Turner in 1902. All species were described from Australia.

== Species ==
From Lepidoptera and Some Other Life Forms:

- Symphyta psaropis Turner, 1902
- Symphyta nyctopis Turner, 1902
- Symphyta colpodes Turner, 1924
- Symphyta oxygramma (Lower, 1902)
- Symphyta nephelodes (Turner, 1924)
