= Lenodora =

Scientific classification
- Kingdom: Animalia
- Phylum: Arthropoda
- Class: Insecta
- Order: Lepidoptera
- Family: Lasiocampidae
- Subfamily: Lasiocampinae
- Genus: Lenodora (Moore, 1883)

Genus of moths

Lenodora is a genus of moths in the family Lasiocampidae confined to India, Sri Lanka and Myanmar. The genus was erected by Frederic Moore in 1883.

== Description ==
Palpi rather short and thickly clothed with hair. Antennae with long branches in male and short in female. Legs thickly clothed with hair. Minute terminal pairs of spurs to mid and hind tibia. Forewings are broad and rounded. veins 6 and 7 stalked. The stalk of veins 8 and 9 rather short. Hindwings with veins 4 and 5 from angle of cell. Vein 8 curved and met by a bar from vein 7. The accessory costal veinlets are prominent and numerous.

== Species ==
- Lenodora crenata
- Lenodora fia
- Lenodora hyalomelaena
- Lenodora oculata
- Lenodora semihyalina
- Lenodora signata
- Lenodora vittata
