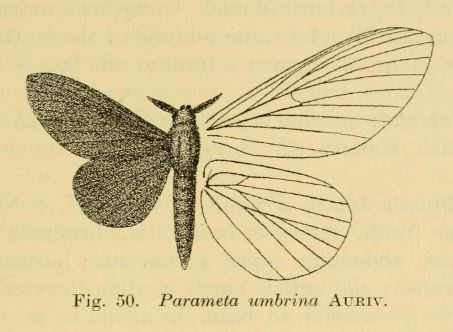

Scientific classification
- Kingdom: Animalia
- Phylum: Arthropoda
- Clade: Pancrustacea
- Class: Insecta
- Order: Lepidoptera
- Family: Lasiocampidae
- Genus: Pehria
- Species: P. umbrina

Binomial name
- Pehria umbrina (Aurivillius, 1909)

Synonyms
- Parameta umbrina Aurivillius, 1909

= Pehria umbrina =

Species of moth

Pehria umbrina is a species of lasiocampid moth. It has a wingspan of 47 mm (1.9 in).

== Distribution ==
It is known from Kouilou in Congo-Brazzaville.
