= Streblote dorsalis =

Scientific classification
- Kingdom: Animalia
- Phylum: Arthropoda
- Class: Insecta
- Order: Lepidoptera
- Family: Lasiocampidae
- Genus: Streblote
- Species: S. dorsalis

Binomial name
- Streblote dorsalis Walker, 1866

Synonyms
- Streblote helpsi Holloway, 1987; Taragama castanoptera Moore, 1888; Taragama hyperantherae Moore, 1883; Taragama igniflua Moore, 1882; Taragama intensa Moore, 1883

Species of moth

Streblote dorsalis is a moth of the family Lasiocampidae first described by Francis Walker in 1866. It is found in India, Sri Lanka, the Philippines, Borneo, Indonesia and Java.

== Description ==
As in most Lepidoptera, the female is larger than the male. The wingspan of the male is 60 mm and 75 mm in the female. Antennae fulvous, with the branches becoming abruptly short at middle in male, but short throughout in female. Body greyish white with dark reddish-brown tegulae. Abdomen reddish brown in each segment with greyish tinge. Legs are without spurs. Forewings dark reddish brown with a white spot at base. Hindwings dark reddish brown in males, and pale in females. Caterpillars are known to feed on Ziziphus mauritiana.

== Subspecies ==
There are two subspecies.

- Streblote dorsalis dorsalis (Walker, 1866)
- Streblote dorsalis pallida (Rothschild, 1915)
