= Beralade =

Scientific classification
- Kingdom: Animalia
- Phylum: Arthropoda
- Class: Insecta
- Order: Lepidoptera
- Family: Lasiocampidae
- Subfamily: Lasiocampinae
- Genus: Beralade; Walker, 1855

Synonyms
- Beralada Janse, 1917; Berelade Walker, 1865; Labea Walker, 1865; Lahea Aurivillius, 1905

Genus of moths

Beralade is a genus of moths in the family Lasiocampidae first described by Francis Walker in 1855.

== Species ==
- Beralade bettoni Aurivillius, 1905
- Beralade bistrigata Strand, 1909
- Beralade continua Aurivillius, 1905
- Beralade convergens Hering, 1932
- Beralade curvistriga Hering, 1929
- Beralade fulvostriata Pagenstecher, 1903
- Beralade gibbonsi Wiltshire, 1947
- Beralade jordani Tams, 1936
- Beralade niphoessa Strand, 1909
- Beralade obliquata Klug, 1830
- Beralade pelodes Tams, 1937
- Beralade perobliqua Walker, 1855
- Beralade pulla Strand, 1909
- Beralade pygmula Strand, 1911
- Beralade sabrina (Druce, 1900)
- Beralade signinervis Strand, 1912
- Beralade simplex Aurivillius, 1905
- Beralade sobrina Druce, 1900
- Beralade sorana Le Cerf, 1922
- Beralade unistriga Hering, 1928
- Beralade wallengreni (Aurivillius, 1892)
