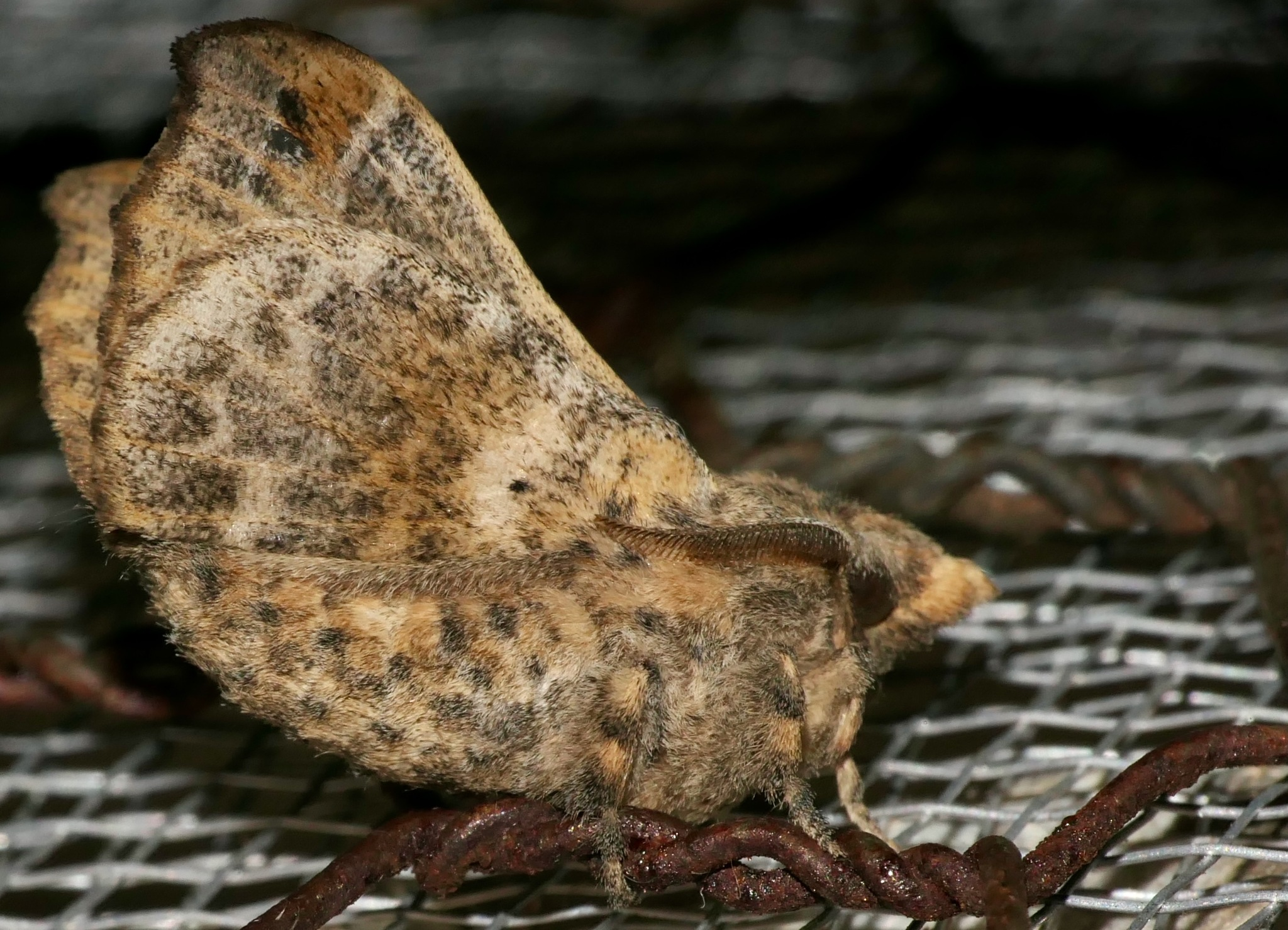

Scientific classification
- Kingdom: Animalia
- Phylum: Arthropoda
- Class: Insecta
- Order: Lepidoptera
- Family: Lasiocampidae
- Genus: Odontopacha
- Species: O. fenestrata

Binomial name
- Odontopacha fenestrata Aurivillius, 1909

= Odontopacha fenestrata =

Species of moth

Odontopacha fenestrata is a species of moth in the family Lasiocampidae. The species was first described by Per Olof Christopher Aurivillius in 1909. It is found in Somalia and Tanzania.
