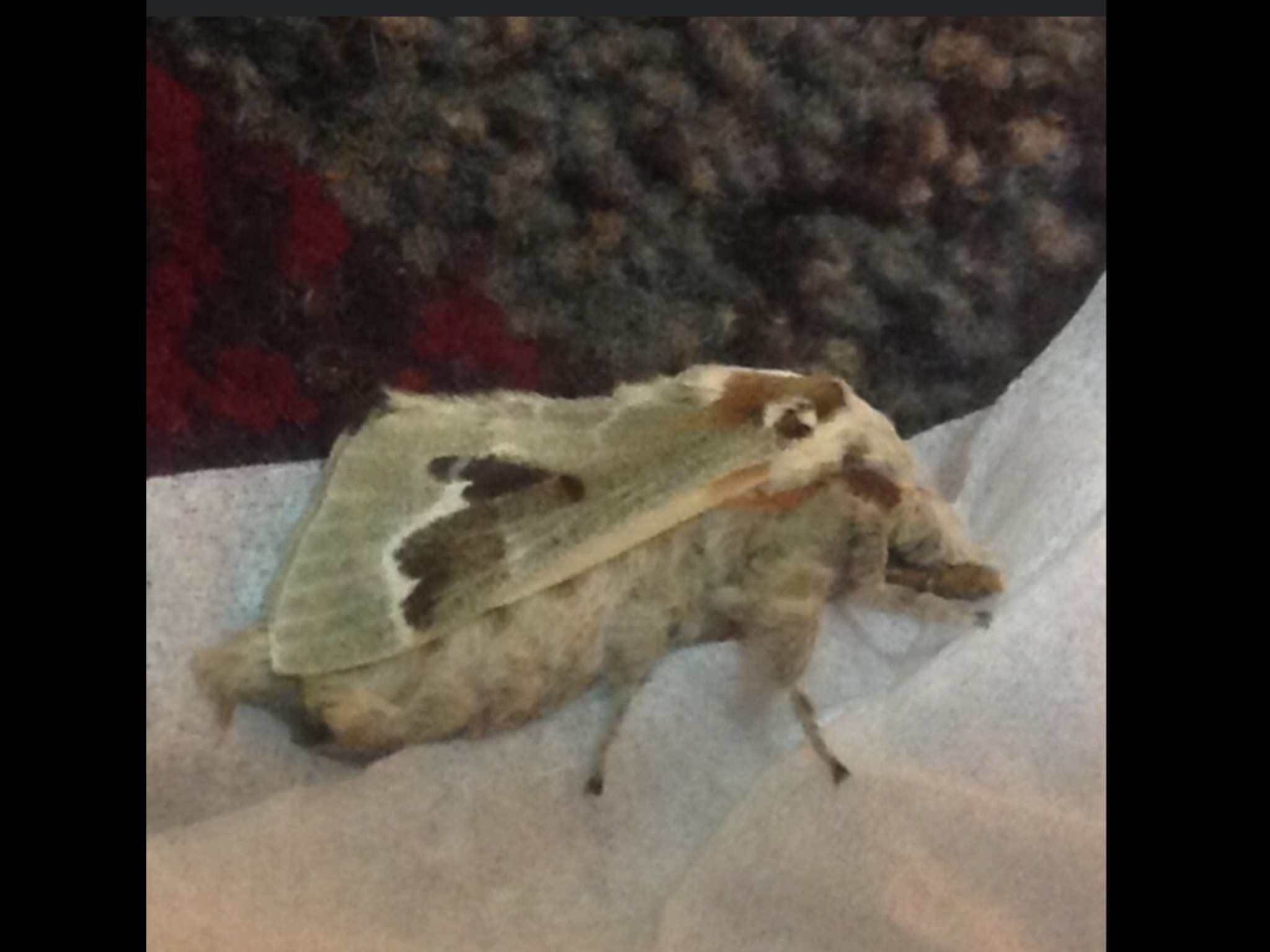
- A male specimen of S. siva

Scientific classification
- Domain: Eukaryota
- Kingdom: Animalia
- Phylum: Arthropoda
- Class: Insecta
- Order: Lepidoptera
- Family: Lasiocampidae
- Genus: Streblote
- Species: S. siva

Binomial name
- Streblote siva (Lefèbvre, 1827)

Synonyms
- Bombyx ganesa Lefèbvre, 1827; Megasoma albicans Walker, 1855; Megasoma pallidium Walker, 1855

= Streblote siva =

Jujube lappet

Species of moth

Streblote siva, the jujube lappet moth, is a medium-sized moth, a widespread Arabic species. It has been documented in the UAE, Bahrain, and Qatar. The species was introduced to Iran. It belongs to the family Lasiocampidae. The species was first described by Lefèbvre in 1827. The species primarily consumes plants of the genus Ziziphus as well as Acacias.

== Description ==
S. siva is a medium-sized moth with a wingspan of about 4–8 cm (1.6–3.1 in). The body is rubble-grey with white stripes on the abdomen. The wings are either ash with mottled brown (in the case of males) and a chestnut brown with subtle white markings in the case of the females.

S. siva is sexually dimorphic, so it is not difficult to distinguish male individuals and females. The larvae of this species are large, and grow up to 10 centimetres. Like other members of the family, the mouthparts are lost in the pupal stage and the adults do not feed.
