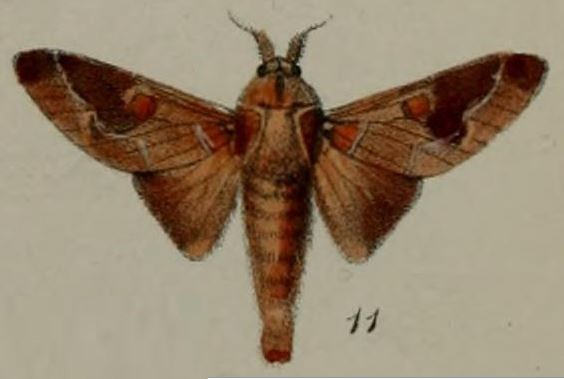

Scientific classification
- Kingdom: Animalia
- Phylum: Arthropoda
- Clade: Pancrustacea
- Class: Insecta
- Order: Lepidoptera
- Family: Lasiocampidae
- Subfamily: Lasiocampinae
- Genus: Streblote; Hübner, [1820]

Synonyms
- Concaedes Wallengren, 1865; Megamosa Collier, 1936; Megasoma Boisduval, 1833; Nadiasa Walker, 1855; Streblota Geyer, 1832; Taragama Moore, 1860; Ticera Swinhoe, 1892

= Streblote =

Genus of moths

Streblote is a genus of moths in the family Lasiocampidae. It was described by Jacob Hübner in 1820.

== Description ==
Palpi broad and obliquely porrect (projecting forward). Antennae with branches becoming abruptly short at middle in males which is short throughout in females. Legs lack spurs. Forewing is long and narrow. Veins 6, 7 and 8 stalked. The stalks of 9 and 10 are long. Hindwing with veins 4 and 5 is stalked and vein 8 is almost touching vein 7. Slight accessory costal veinlets present.

== Species ==
Some species of this genus are:

- Streblote acaciae (Klug, 1829)
- Streblote aegyptiaca (Bang-Haas, 1906)
- Streblote alpherakyi (Christoph, 1885)
- Streblote badaglioi (Berio, 1937)
- Streblote bakeri (Riel, 1911)
- Streblote bimaculatum (Walker, 1865)
- Streblote butiti (Bethune-Baker, 1906)
- Streblote capensis (Aurivillius, 1905)
- Streblote carinata (Wallengren, 1860)
- Streblote castanea (Swinhoe, 1892)
- Streblote concavum (Strand, 1912)
- Streblote concolor (Walker, 1855)
- Streblote cristata (Stoll, 1782)
- Streblote cuprea (Distant, 1899)
- Streblote diluta (Aurivillius, 1905)
- Streblote diplocyma (Hampson, 1909)
- Streblote dorsalis (Walker, 1866)
- Streblote fainae (Gerasimov, 1931)
- Streblote finitorum Tams, 1931
- Streblote guineanum (Strand, 1912)
- Streblote groenendaeli
- Streblote helpsi Holloway
- Streblote igniflua (Moore, 1883)
- Streblote jansei (Tams, 1936)
- Streblote jordani (Tams, 1936)
- Streblote madibirense (Wichgraf, 1921)
- Streblote misanum (Strand, 1912)
- Streblote nyassanum (Strand, 1912)
- Streblote pallida
- Streblote pancala (Tams, 1936)
- Streblote panda Hübner, 1822
- Streblote polydora (Druce, 1887)
- Streblote postalbida (Schaus, 1897)
- Streblote primigenum Staudinger, 1887
- Streblote rufaria (Bethune-Baker, 1908)
- Streblote siva (Lefèbvre, 1827)
- Streblote sodalium (Aurivillius, 1915)
- Streblote solitaria Zolotuhin, 1991
- Streblote stupidum (Staudinger, 1887)
- Streblote tessmanni (Strand, 1912)
- Streblote uniforme (Aurivillius, 1927)
