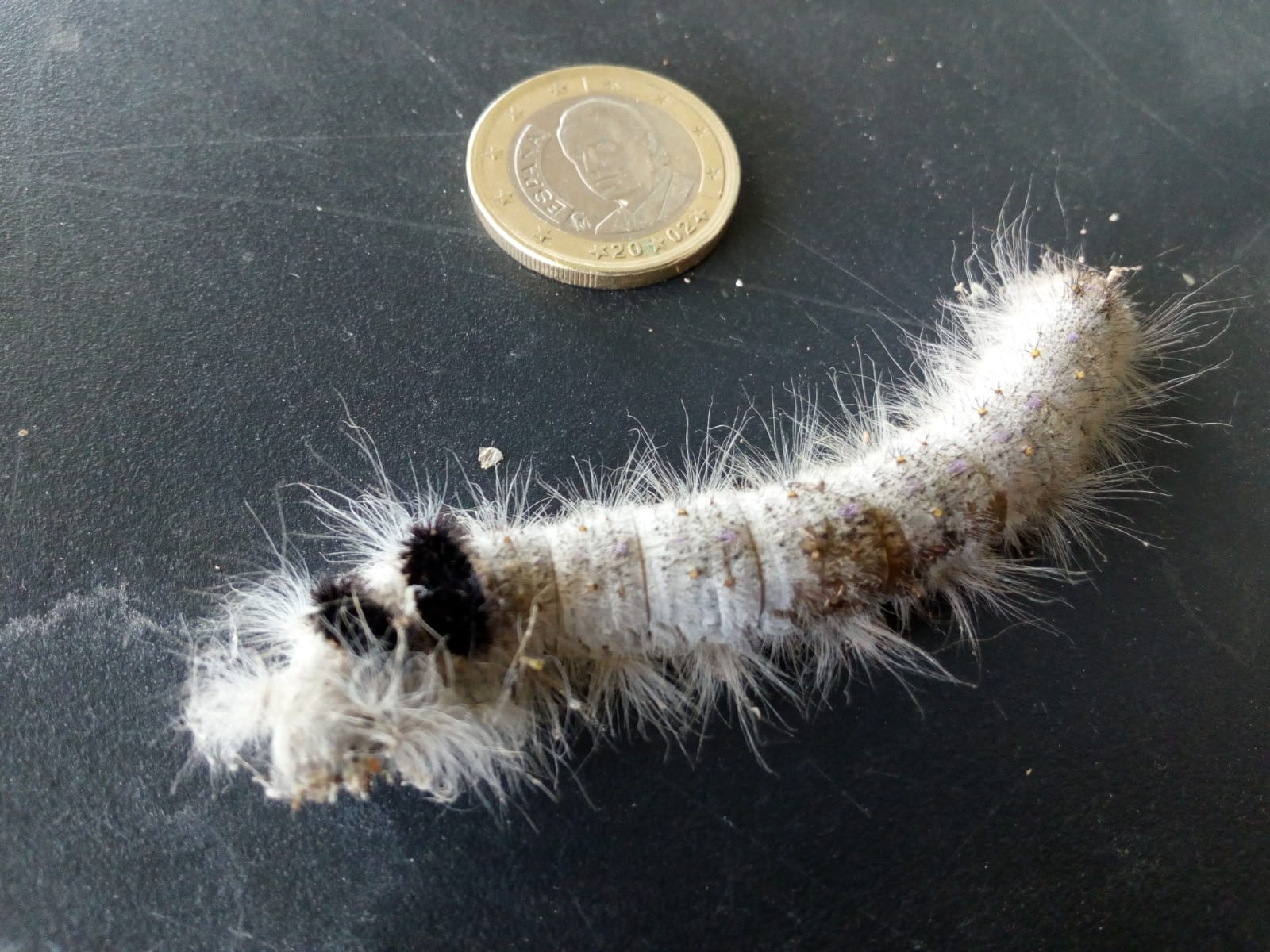

Scientific classification
- Kingdom: Animalia
- Phylum: Arthropoda
- Clade: Pancrustacea
- Class: Insecta
- Order: Lepidoptera
- Family: Lasiocampidae
- Genus: Streblote
- Species: S. panda

Binomial name
- Streblote panda Hübner, 1820

Synonyms
- Bombyx repanda Hübner, 1802/08; Taragama roseoclara Schawerda, 1928; Taragama tenebrosa Rothschild, 1917

= Streblote panda =

Species of moth

Streblote panda is a moth of the family Lasiocampidae.
