= Cyclophragma centralistrigata =

Scientific classification
- Kingdom: Animalia
- Phylum: Arthropoda
- Class: Insecta
- Order: Lepidoptera
- Family: Lasiocampidae
- Genus: Cyclophragma
- Species: C. centralistrigata

Binomial name
- Cyclophragma centralistrigata (Bethune-Baker, 1904)

Synonyms
- Odonestis centralistrigata Bethune-Baker, 1904

Species of moth

Cyclophragma centralistrigata is a moth of the family Lasiocampidae. It is found in Australia.
