= Chilena strigula =

Scientific classification
- Kingdom: Animalia
- Phylum: Arthropoda
- Class: Insecta
- Order: Lepidoptera
- Family: Lasiocampidae
- Genus: Chilena
- Species: C. strigula

Binomial name
- Chilena strigula Walker, 1865

Species of moth

Chilena strigula is a moth of the family Lasiocampidae first described by Francis Walker in 1865. It is found in India and Sri Lanka. Caterpillars are known to feed on Acacia species.
