= Philotherma tandoensis =

Scientific classification
- Domain: Eukaryota
- Kingdom: Animalia
- Phylum: Arthropoda
- Class: Insecta
- Order: Lepidoptera
- Family: Lasiocampidae
- Genus: Philotherma
- Species: P. tandoensis

Binomial name
- Philotherma tandoensis Bethune-Baker, 1927

Species of moth

Philotherma tandoensis is a moth in the family Lasiocampidae. It was described by George Thomas Bethune-Baker in 1927. It is found in Angola.

The wingspan is about 72 mm. The wings are very pale grey, with a slight cinnamon tinge. The forewings have a slightly curved brown median line and an oblique straight postmedian line not reaching quite to the costa. Beyond this, the wing is clouded with cinnamon, and there is a submarginal row of nine indefinite internervular grey spots, broken outwards below the sixth. There is also a brown spot in the cell pupilled with white, and the median area is somewhat clouded with cinnamon. The hindwings have a postmedian brown line across the wing and a series of eight grey internervular spots that are more prominent on the underside. The central area is clouded with cinnamon.
