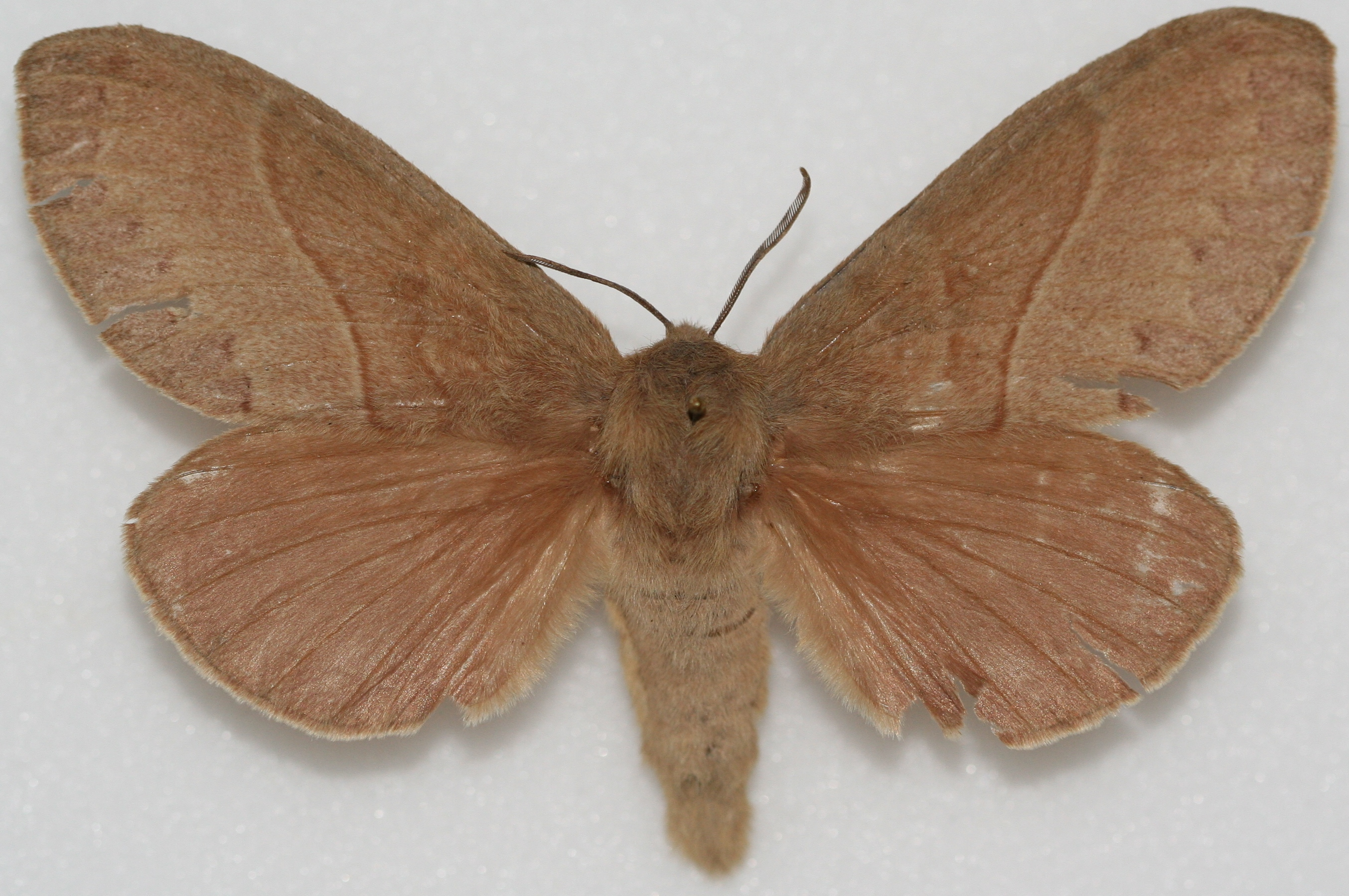

Scientific classification
- Kingdom: Animalia
- Phylum: Arthropoda
- Clade: Pancrustacea
- Class: Insecta
- Order: Lepidoptera
- Family: Lasiocampidae
- Subfamily: Lasiocampinae
- Genus: Dicogaster; Barnes & McDunnough, 1911
- Species: D. coronada

Binomial name
- Dicogaster coronada (Barnes, 1904)

Synonyms
- Gloveria coronada Barnes, 1904; Gloveria valens Dyar, 1906

= Dicogaster =

Genus of moths

Dicogaster is a genus of moths in the family Lasiocampidae first described by William Barnes and James Halliday McDunnough in 1911. Its only species, Dicogaster coronada, was first described by Barnes in 1904. It is found in Arizona.

The wingspan is 70–130 mm. Adults are on wing from June to August.

Larvae have been reared on Quercus oblongifolia and Quercus emoryi.
