= Europtera =

Scientific classification
- Domain: Eukaryota
- Kingdom: Animalia
- Phylum: Arthropoda
- Class: Insecta
- Order: Lepidoptera
- Family: Lasiocampidae
- Subfamily: Lasiocampinae
- Genus: Europtera de Lajonquière, 1970

Genus of moths

Europtera is a genus of moths in the family Lasiocampidae. The genus was erected by Yves de Lajonquière in 1970.

== Species ==
Some species of this genus are:

- Europtera pandani De Lajonquière, 1972
- Europtera punctillata (Saalmüller, 1884)
