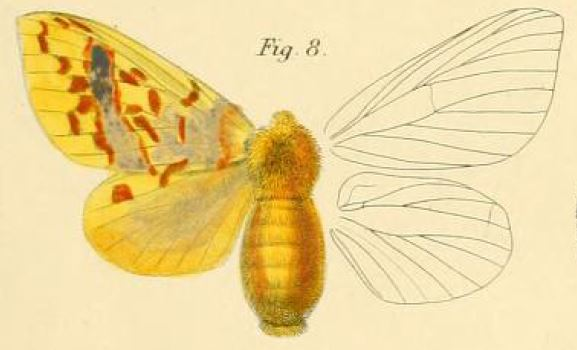

Scientific classification
- Kingdom: Animalia
- Phylum: Arthropoda
- Clade: Pancrustacea
- Class: Insecta
- Order: Lepidoptera
- Family: Lasiocampidae
- Genus: Chrysopsyche
- Species: C. mirifica

Binomial name
- Chrysopsyche mirifica (Butler, 1878)

Synonyms
- Choerotriche mirifica Butler, 1878; Chrysopsyche mirifica leptophyes Tams, 1936; Lasiocampa maera Schaus, 1893; Lasiocampa radei Dewitz, 1881

= Chrysopsyche mirifica =

Species of moth

Chrysopsyche mirifica is a moth of the family Lasiocampidae first described by Arthur Gardiner Butler in 1878. It is found in Angola, Sierra Leone, Cameroon and Nigeria.

== Biology ==
Food-plants of this species are Alchornea cordifolia, Eucalyptus species, Neoboutonia species, Quisqualis indica and Rosa species.
