= Chrysopsyche yaundae =

Scientific classification
- Kingdom: Animalia
- Phylum: Arthropoda
- Class: Insecta
- Order: Lepidoptera
- Family: Lasiocampidae
- Genus: Chrysopsyche
- Species: C. yaundae

Binomial name
- Chrysopsyche yaundae Bethune-Baker, 1927

Species of moth

Chrysopsyche yaundae is a moth in the family Lasiocampidae. It was described by George Thomas Bethune-Baker in 1927. It is found in Cameroon.

The wingspan is about 38 mm. The forewings are very dark olive-green, with a trace of a dark subbasal transverse stripe and also a trace of a median stripe. The hindwings are dark sooty brown with paler fringes.
