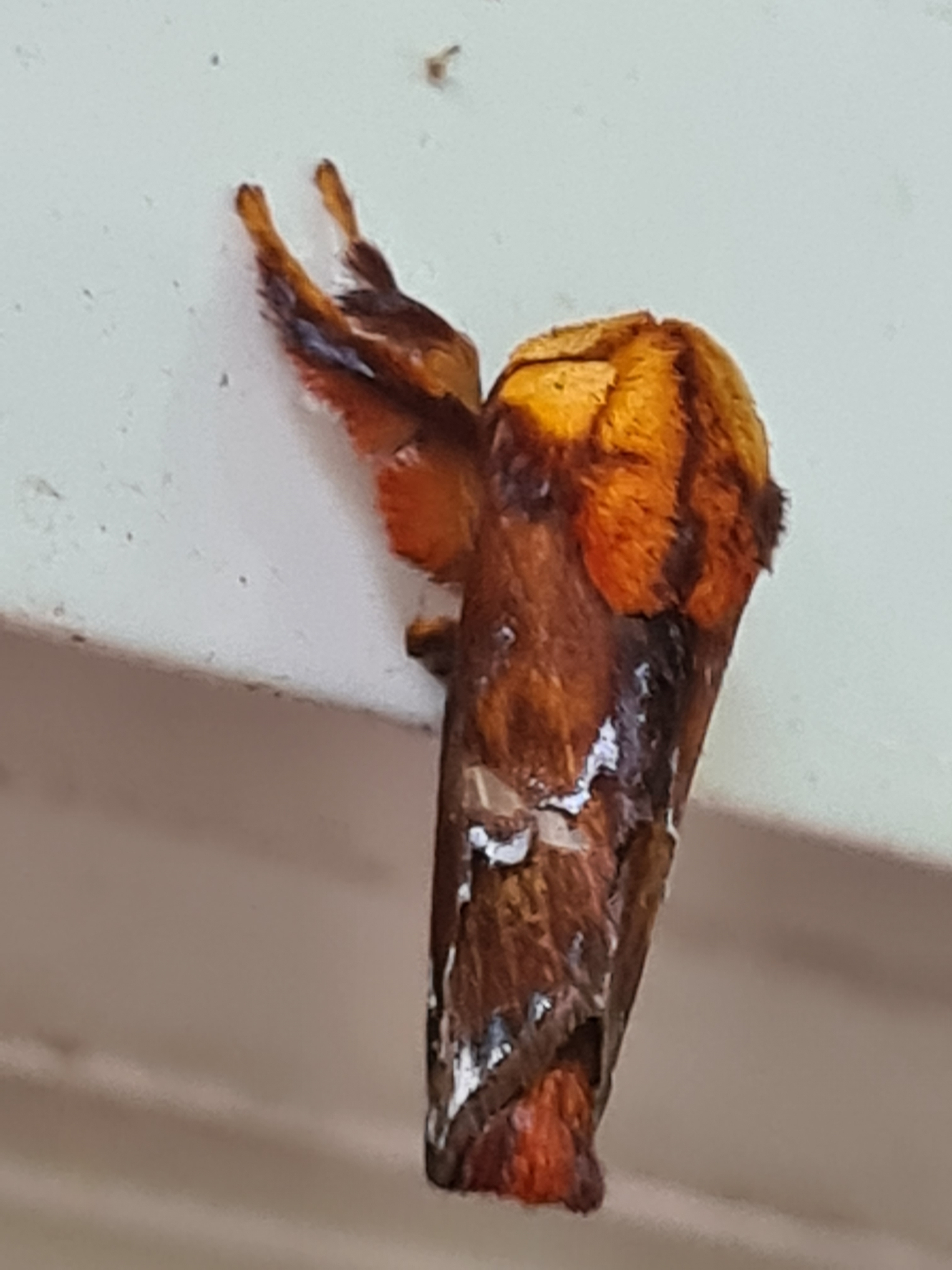

Scientific classification
- Kingdom: Animalia
- Phylum: Arthropoda
- Class: Insecta
- Order: Lepidoptera
- Family: Limacodidae
- Genus: Miresa
- Species: M. clarissa

Binomial name
- Miresa clarissa (Stoll, 1790)

= Miresa clarissa =

Species of moth

Miresa clarissa is a species of moth from the genus Miresa. The species was first described by Caspar Stoll in 1790.

== Range ==
When the species was initially described it was mentioned that the range is in Dutch Guiana (former name of Suriname) and Brazil. Recent observation of the species suggests a range that extends beyond the Amazon basin extending up to Honduras.
