= Apatelopteryx deceptrix =

Scientific classification
- Kingdom: Animalia
- Phylum: Arthropoda
- Clade: Pancrustacea
- Class: Insecta
- Order: Lepidoptera
- Family: Lasiocampidae
- Genus: Apatelopteryx
- Species: A. deceptrix

Binomial name
- Apatelopteryx deceptrix (Kenrick, 1914)

Synonyms
- Taragama deceptrix Kenrick, 1914

Species of moth

Apatelopteryx deceptrix is a moth of the family of Lasiocampidae. It is found in Madagascar.

The wingspan of this moth is 46 mm.
