= Closterothrix =

Scientific classification
- Kingdom: Animalia
- Phylum: Arthropoda
- Clade: Pancrustacea
- Class: Insecta
- Order: Lepidoptera
- Family: Lasiocampidae
- Subfamily: Lasiocampinae
- Genus: Closterothrix (Mabille, 1879)

Genus of moths

Closterothrix is a genus of moths in the family Lasiocampidae. The genus was erected by Paul Mabille in 1879.

== Species ==
Based on Afromoths:

- Closterothrix bosei (Saalmüller, 1880)
- Closterothrix bruncki De Lajonquière, 1974
- Closterothrix diabolus (Hering, 1928)
- Closterothrix fulvipuncta (Viette, 1962)
- Closterothrix funebris De Lajonquière, 1970
- Closterothrix gambeyi Mabille, 1879
- Closterothrix goliath (Viette, 1962)
- Closterothrix goudoti Viette, 1962
- Closterothrix insularis Viette, 1962
- Closterothrix leonina (Butler, 1882)
- Closterothrix nigrosparsata Viette, 1962
- Closterothrix peyrierasi Viette, 1988
- Closterothrix secernenda De Lajonquière, 1969
- Closterothrix sikorae Aurivillius, 1909
