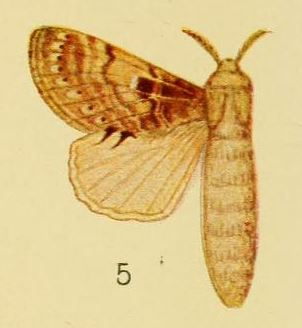
- Odontocheilopteryx maculata

Scientific classification
- Kingdom: Animalia
- Phylum: Arthropoda
- Clade: Pancrustacea
- Class: Insecta
- Order: Lepidoptera
- Family: Lasiocampidae
- Genus: Odontocheilopteryx; Wallengren, 1860

= Odontocheilopteryx =

Genus of moths

Odontocheilopteryx is a genus of moths in the family Lasiocampidae. The genus was first described by Wallengrenin 1860.

== Species ==
Based on Afromoths:

- Odontocheilopteryx conzolia Gurkovich & Zolotuhin, 2009
- Odontocheilopteryx corvus Gurkovich & Zolotuhin, 2009
- Odontocheilopteryx cuanza Gurkovich & Zolotuhin, 2009
- Odontocheilopteryx dollmani Tams, 1930
- Odontocheilopteryx eothina Tams, 1931
- Odontocheilopteryx ferlina Gurkovich & Zolotuhin, 2009
- Odontocheilopteryx foedifragus Gurkovich & Zolotuhin, 2009
- Odontocheilopteryx gracifica Gurkovich & Zolotuhin, 2009
- Odontocheilopteryx haribda Gurkovich & Zolotuhin, 2009
- Odontocheilopteryx lajonquieri Rougeot, 1977
- Odontocheilopteryx maculata Aurivillius, 1905
- Odontocheilopteryx malagassy Viette, 1962
- Odontocheilopteryx meridionalis Viette, 1962
- Odontocheilopteryx myxa Wallengren, 1860
- Odontocheilopteryx obscura Aurivillius, 1927
- Odontocheilopteryx pattersoni Tams, 1926
- Odontocheilopteryx phoneus Hering, 1928
- Odontocheilopteryx pica Gurkovich & Zolotuhin, 2009
- Odontocheilopteryx politzari Gurkovich & Zolotuhin, 2009
- Odontocheilopteryx similis Tams, 1929
- Odontocheilopteryx spicola Gurkovich & Zolotuhin, 2009
- Odontocheilopteryx stokata Gurkovich & Zolotuhin, 2009
