= Anastrolos =

Scientific classification
- Kingdom: Animalia
- Phylum: Arthropoda
- Class: Insecta
- Order: Lepidoptera
- Family: Lasiocampidae
- Genus: Anastrolos; Fletcher, 1982

Genus of moths

Anastrolos is a genus of moths in the family Lasiocampidae. The genus was erected by Fletcher in 1982. All species are found in Australia.

== Species ==
Based on Lepidoptera and Some Other Life Forms:

- Anastrolos apasta (Turner, 1924)
- Anastrolos zoristis (Turner, 1924)
- Anastrolos holopolia (Turner, 1924)
- Anastrolos porphyrica (Turner, 1941)
