= Cyclophragma =

Scientific classification
- Kingdom: Animalia
- Phylum: Arthropoda
- Class: Insecta
- Order: Lepidoptera
- Family: Lasiocampidae
- Genus: Cyclophragma; Turner, 1911

Genus of moths

Cyclophragma is a genus of moths in the family Lasiocampidae. It was erected by Turner in 1911.

== Species ==
Based on Lepidoptera and Some Other Life Forms:

- Cyclophragma cyclomela (Lower, 1903) - Australia
- Cyclophragma centralistrigata (Bethune-Baker, 1904) - Australia
