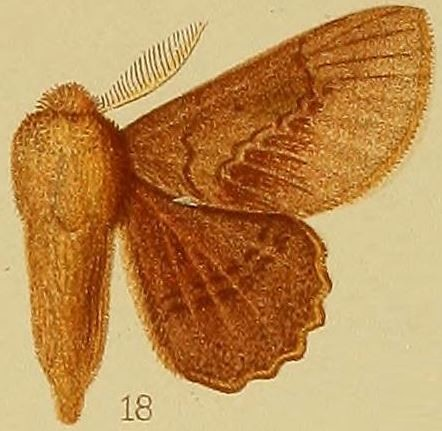
- Stenophatna cymographa

Scientific classification
- Kingdom: Animalia
- Phylum: Arthropoda
- Class: Insecta
- Order: Lepidoptera
- Family: Lasiocampidae
- Genus: Stenophatna; Aurivillius, 1909

= Stenophatna =

Genus of moths

Stenophatna is a genus of moths in the family Lasiocampidae. The genus was erected by Per Olof Christopher Aurivillius in 1909.

== Species ==
- Stenophatna accolita Zolotuhin & Prozorov, 2010
- Stenophatna foedifraga Zolotuhin & Prozorov, 2010
- Stenophatna libera Aurivillius, 1914
- Stenophatna marshalli Aurivillius, 1909
- Stenophatna proxima Romieux, 1943
