= Anadiasa =

Scientific classification
- Kingdom: Animalia
- Phylum: Arthropoda
- Class: Insecta
- Order: Lepidoptera
- Family: Lasiocampidae
- Genus: Anadiasa; Aurivillius, 1904

Genus of moths

Anadiasa is a genus of moths in the family Lasiocampidae. The genus was erected by Per Olof Christopher Aurivillius in 1904.

== Species ==
Based on Lepidoptera and Some other Life Forms:

- Anadiasa undata (Klug, 1832, 1939) Mauritania, Sahara, Egypt
- Anadiasa obsoleta (Klug, 1830) Sudan, Egypt
