= Syrastrenopsis =

Scientific classification
- Kingdom: Animalia
- Phylum: Arthropoda
- Class: Insecta
- Order: Lepidoptera
- Family: Lasiocampidae
- Genus: Syrastrenopsis; Grünberg, 1914

Genus of moths

Syrastrenopsis is a genus of moths in the family Lasiocampidae. The genus was erected by Karl Grünberg in 1914.

== Species ==
Based on Lepidoptera and Some Other Life Forms:

- Syrastrenopsis moltrechti Grünberg, 1914 Ussuri, Russia
- Syrastrenopsis kawabei Kishida Taiwan
- Syrastrenopsis imperiatus Zolotuhin, 2001 Yunnan, China
- Syrastrenopsis inthanonensis Orhant, 2001 northern Thailand
