= Pellecebra =

Scientific classification
- Kingdom: Animalia
- Phylum: Arthropoda
- Clade: Pancrustacea
- Class: Insecta
- Order: Lepidoptera
- Family: Lasiocampidae
- Genus: Pellecebra; Prozorov & Zolotuhin, 2012
- Species: P. superba

Binomial name
- Pellecebra superba Prozorov & Zolotuhin, 2012

Genus of moths

Pellecebra is an Afrotropical monotypic genus of moths in the family Lasiocampidae. Its sole species, Pellecebra superba, is found in the Democratic Republic of the Congo—which is its type locality—the Republic of the Congo, Cameroon, Gabon and Nigeria.

The holotype of P. superba is part of the collection of Lepidoptera specimen at Museum Witt Munich.
