= Caloecia =

Scientific classification
- Kingdom: Animalia
- Phylum: Arthropoda
- Class: Insecta
- Order: Lepidoptera
- Family: Lasiocampidae
- Genus: Caloecia; Barnes & McDunnough, 1911

Genus of moths

Caloecia is a genus of moths in the family Lasiocampidae. The genus was erected by William Barnes and James Halliday McDunnough in 1911. Both species are known from the US state of Arizona.

== Species ==
Based on Lepidoptera and Some Other Life Forms:

- Caloecia juvenalis (Barnes & McDunnough, 1911)
- Caloecia entima Franclemont, 1973
