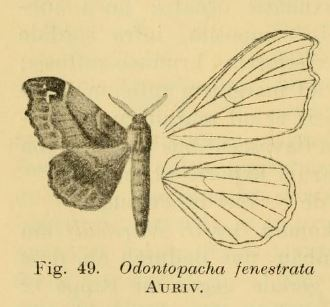
- Odontopacha fenestrata

Scientific classification
- Domain: Eukaryota
- Kingdom: Animalia
- Phylum: Arthropoda
- Class: Insecta
- Order: Lepidoptera
- Family: Lasiocampidae
- Genus: Odontopacha; Aurivillius, 1909

= Odontopacha =

Genus of moths

Odontopacha is a genus of moths in the family Lasiocampidae. The genus was erected by Per Olof Christopher Aurivillius in 1909.

== Species ==
- Odontopacha fenestrata Aurivillius, 1909 (Somalia/Tanzania)
- Odontopacha kilwana Strand, 1911 (Eritrea/Zimbabwe)
- Odontopacha phaula Tams 1929 (Cameroon)
- Odontopacha spissa Tams 1929 (Angola/Cameroon)
