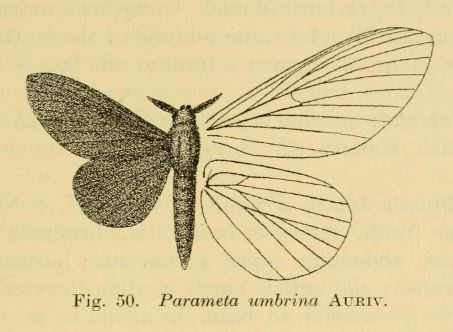
- Pehria umbrina

Scientific classification
- Domain: Eukaryota
- Kingdom: Animalia
- Phylum: Arthropoda
- Class: Insecta
- Order: Lepidoptera
- Family: Lasiocampidae
- Genus: Pehria; Strand, 1910 (repl.name)

Synonyms
- Parameta Aurivillius, 1909

= Pehria =

Genus of moths

Pehria is a genus of moths in the family Lasiocampidae. The genus was erected by Embrik Strand in 1910.

== Species ==
- Pehria electrophaea Tams 1929
- Pehria strandi Tams 1929
- Pehria umbrina Aurivillius, 1909 (from Congo (Kouilou)
