= Chilena =

Scientific classification
- Kingdom: Animalia
- Phylum: Arthropoda
- Class: Insecta
- Order: Lepidoptera
- Family: Lasiocampidae
- Subfamily: Lasiocampinae
- Tribe: Selenepherini
- Genus: Chilena; Walker, 1855

Genus of moths

Chilena is a genus of moths in the family Lasiocampidae. It was described by Francis Walker in 1855. They are distributed in Nepal, central India, and Sri Lanka.

== Description ==
Palpi short and slight. Antennae with branches of nearly equal length in both sexes. Abdomen tufted at extremity in male. Mid and hind tibia with minute terminal pairs of spurs. Forewings are broad, the outer margin is oblique. Veins 6 and 7 stalked. Stalk of veins 9 and 10 rather long. Hindwings with veins 4 and 5 are stalked and vein 8 almost touching vein 7. There are slight necessary costal veinlets.

== Species ==
- Chilena similis
- Chilena sordida
- Chilena strigula
