= Phoenicladocera =

Scientific classification
- Kingdom: Animalia
- Phylum: Arthropoda
- Class: Insecta
- Order: Lepidoptera
- Family: Lasiocampidae
- Genus: Phoenicladocera; De Lajonquière, 1970

Type species
- Phoenicladocera merina De Lajonquière, 1970

Genus of moths

Phoenicladocera is a genus of moths in the family Lasiocampidae from Madagascar. The genus was erected by Yves de Lajonquière in 1970.

== Species ==
Some species of this genus are:

- Phoenicladocera griveaudi De Lajonquière, 1972
- Phoenicladocera herbuloti De Lajonquière, 1972
- Phoenicladocera lajonquierei Viette, 1981
- Phoenicladocera merina De Lajonquière, 1970
- Phoenicladocera nitescens De Lajonquière, 1972
- Phoenicladocera parvinota (Hering, 1929)
- Phoenicladocera toulgoeti De Lajonquière, 1972
- Phoenicladocera turtur De Lajonquière, 1972
- Phoenicladocera viettei De Lajonquière, 1970
- Phoenicladocera vulpicolor (Kenrick, 1914)
- Phoenicladocera wintreberti De Lajonquière, 1972
- Phoenicladocera xanthogramma De Lajonquière, 1972
