= Somadasys =

Scientific classification
- Kingdom: Animalia
- Phylum: Arthropoda
- Clade: Pancrustacea
- Class: Insecta
- Order: Lepidoptera
- Family: Lasiocampidae
- Genus: Somadasys (Gaede, 1932)

Genus of moths

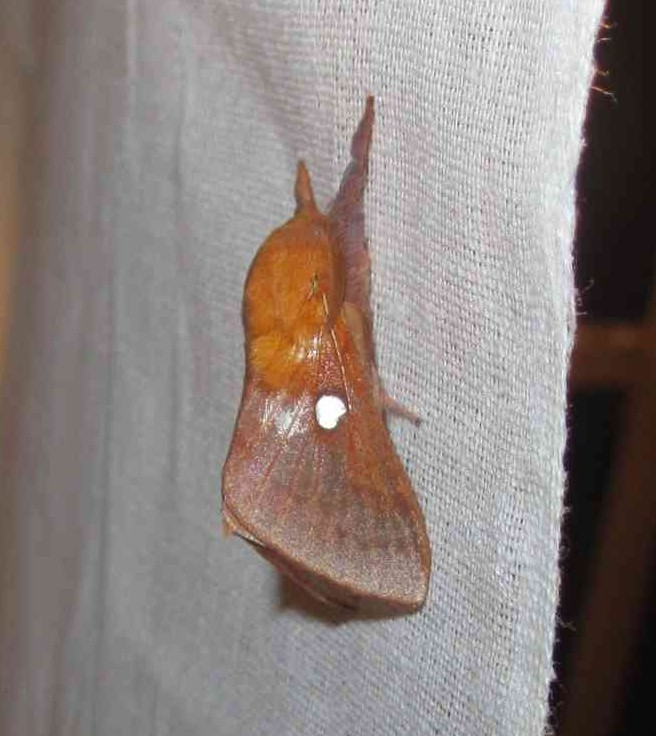
Somadasyas catocoides moth photographed in Wangxiang, Xinyi, Nantou, Taiwan

Somadasys is a genus of moths in the family Lasiocampidae. The genus was erected by Max Gaede in 1932.

== Species ==
- Somadasys brevivenis
- Somadasys catacoides (or Somadasys catocoides)
- Somadasys daisensis
- Somadasys kibunensis
- Somadasys lunatus
- Somadasys takamukui
- Somadasys saturatus
- Somadasys yatsugadakensis
