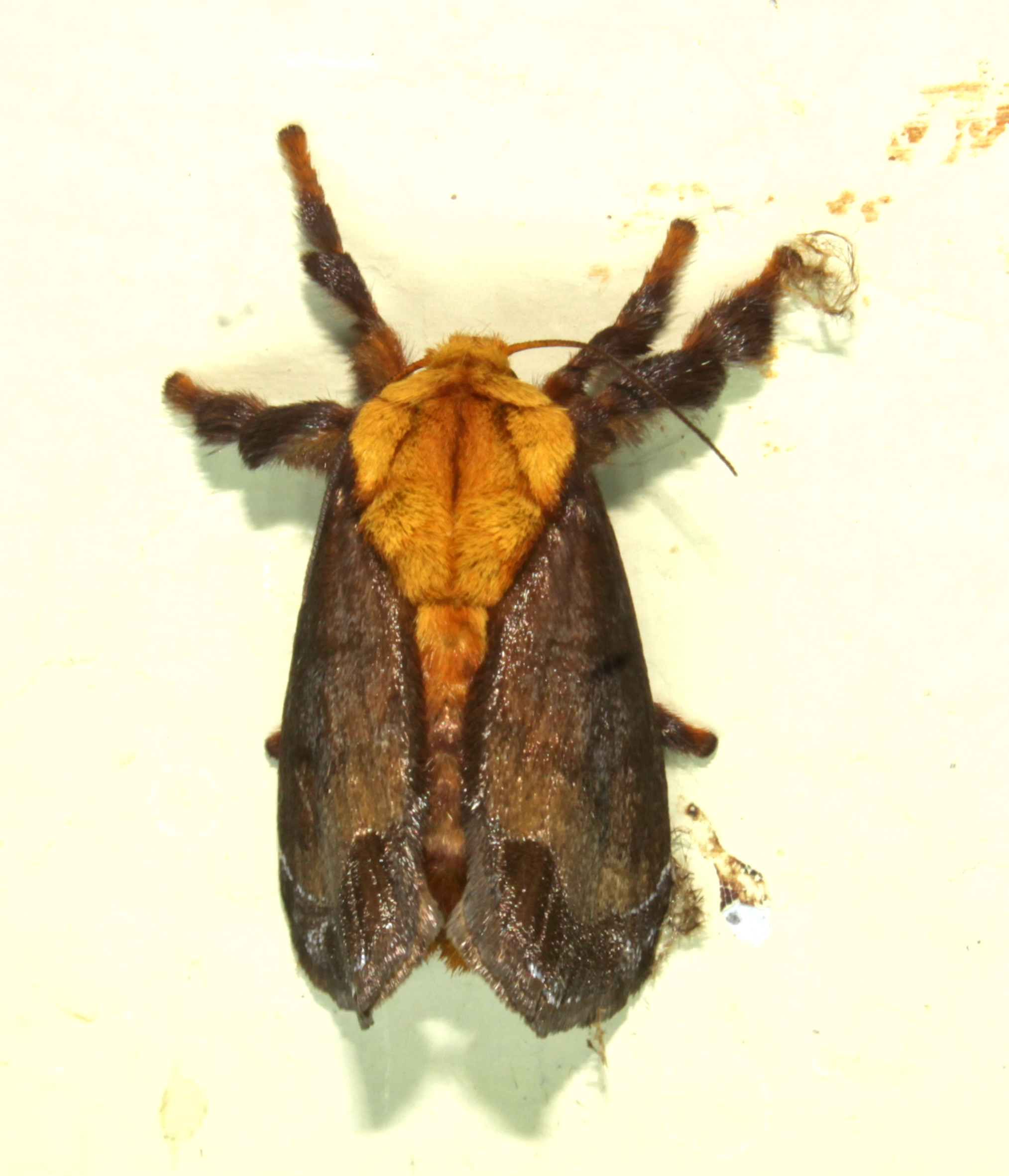
- Miresa bracteata

Scientific classification
- Domain: Eukaryota
- Kingdom: Animalia
- Phylum: Arthropoda
- Class: Insecta
- Order: Lepidoptera
- Family: Limacodidae
- Subfamily: Limacodinae
- Genus: Miresa; Walker, 1855

Type species
- Nyssia albipuncta Herrich-Schäffer, 1854

Synonyms
- Nyssia Herrich-Schäffer, 1854; Miresopsis Matsumura, 1927; Neomiresa Butler

= Miresa =

Genus of moths

Miresa is a genus of moths in the family Limacodidae that was first described by Francis Walker in 1855.

== Description ==
Palpi not reaching beyond frontal tuft. Antennae of male with serrated distal half, mid and hind tibia with terminal pairs of spurs. Forewings with veins 7, 8 and 9 stalked. Hindwings with veins 6 and 7 on a short stalk or from cell.

== Species ==
- Miresa albipuncta Herrich-Schäffer, 1854 - India, Sri Lanka
- Miresa argentifera Walker - Sri Lanka
- Miresa basirufa Hering, 1941 - Congo
- Miresa bilineata Hering, 1928
- Miresa bracteata Butler, 1880 - India, Indonesia, Malaysia, Thailand
- Miresa burmensis Hering - China, Laos, Myanmar, Thailand, Vietnam
- Miresa clarissa (Stoll, 1790) - Costa Rica, French Guiana
- Miresa demangei de Joannis - Bhutan, China, Myanmar, Vietnam
- Miresa exigua - China, Myanmar
- Miresa fangae Wu & Solovyev, 2011 - China
- Miresa fulgida Wileman - China, Taiwan, Vietnam
- Miresa gilba Karsch, 1899 - Ghana
- Miresa gliricidiae Hering, 1933 - Sierra Leone
- Miresa habenichti Wichgraf, 1913 - Mozambique
- Miresa kwangtungensis Hering, 1931 - China, Laos, Vietnam
- Miresa livida West, 1940 - Congo
- Miresa polargenta Wu & Solovyev, 2011 - Vietnam
- Miresa rorida - Laos, Thailand
- Miresa sagitovae - Myanmar, Thailand, Vietnam
- Miresa semicalida Hampson, 1910 - Congo, Zambia
- Miresa sibinoides Hering, 1931
- Miresa strigivena Hampson, 190 - Nigeria
- Miresa urga Hering, 1933 - China
