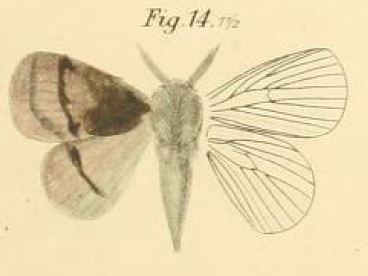
- Euwallengrenia reducta

Scientific classification
- Kingdom: Animalia
- Phylum: Arthropoda
- Class: Insecta
- Order: Lepidoptera
- Family: Lasiocampidae
- Subfamily: Lasiocampinae
- Genus: Euwallengrenia; D. S. Fletcher, 1968

Synonyms
- Olyra Wallengren, 1865

= Euwallengrenia =

Genus of moths

Euwallengrenia is a genus of moths in the family Lasiocampidae. It was described by David Stephen Fletcher in 1968.

Some species in this genus are:

- Euwallengrenia rectilineata (Aurivillius, 1905)
- Euwallengrenia reducta (Walker, 1855)
