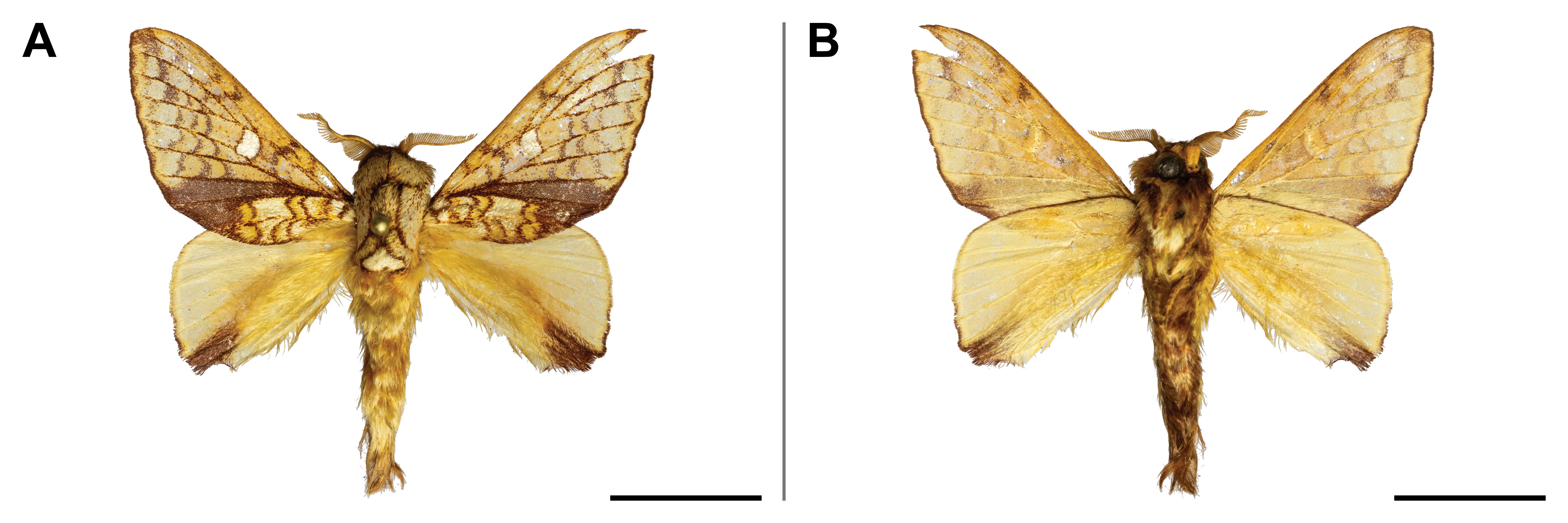

Scientific classification
- Kingdom: Animalia
- Phylum: Arthropoda
- Class: Insecta
- Order: Lepidoptera
- Family: Lasiocampidae
- Genus: Hypotrabala; Holland, 1893

= Hypotrabala =

Genus of moths

Hypotrabala is a genus of moths in the family Lasiocampidae. The genus was erected by William Jacob Holland in 1893.

== Species ==
Some species of this genus are:

- Hypotrabala castanea Holland, 1893
- Hypotrabala odonestioides Berio, 1937
- Hypotrabala regalis Tams, 1953
- Hypotrabala regius (De Lajonquière, 1973)
- Hypotrabala sanguicincta (Aurivillius, 1901)
