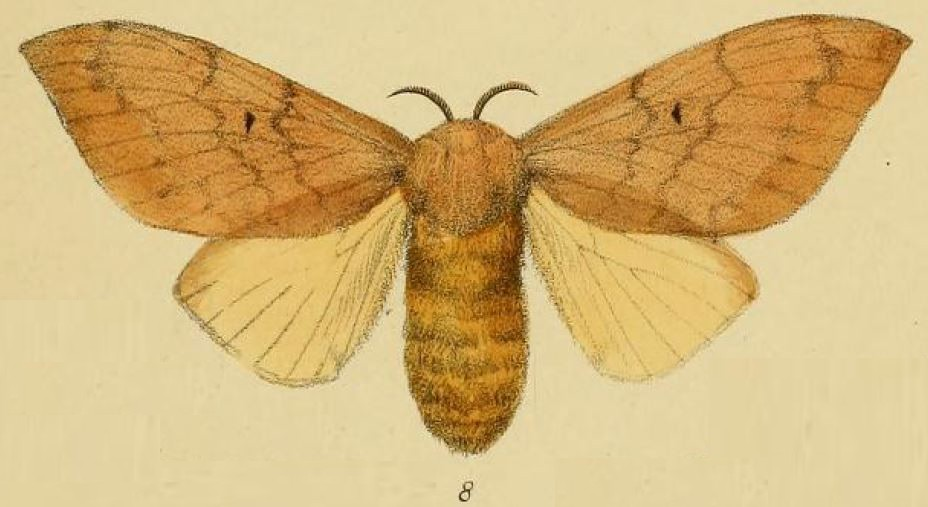
- Leptometa matuta

Scientific classification
- Kingdom: Animalia
- Phylum: Arthropoda
- Class: Insecta
- Order: Lepidoptera
- Family: Lasiocampidae
- Genus: Leptometa; Aurivillius, 1927

= Leptometa =

Genus of moths

Leptometa is a genus of moths in the family Lasiocampidae. The genus was erected by Per Olof Christopher Aurivillius in 1927.

== Species ==
Some species of this genus are:

- Leptometa hintzi Hering, 1928
- Leptometa matuta (Schaus & Clements, 1893)
- Leptometa sapelensis Aurivillius, 1927
