= Gastromega =

Scientific classification
- Kingdom: Animalia
- Phylum: Arthropoda
- Class: Insecta
- Order: Lepidoptera
- Family: Lasiocampidae
- Genus: Gastromega; Saalmüller, 1884

Type species
- Gastromega badia (Saalmüller, 1878)

Genus of moths

Gastromega is a genus of moth in the family Lasiocampidae.

== Species ==
Some species of this genus are:

- Gastromega badia (Saalmüller, 1878)
- Gastromega robusta De Lajonquière, 1972
- Gastromega sordida (Mabille, 1879)
