= Ergolea =

Scientific classification
- Kingdom: Animalia
- Phylum: Arthropoda
- Class: Insecta
- Order: Lepidoptera
- Family: Lasiocampidae
- Genus: Ergolea; Dumont, 1922

Genus of moths

Ergolea is a genus of moths in the family Lasiocampidae first described by Constantin Dumont in 1922.

== Species ==
Based on Lepidoptera and Some Other Life Forms:

- Ergolea reneae Dumont, 1922 found in Algeria
- Ergolea geyri (Rothschild, 1916)
