= Quadrina =

Scientific classification
- Kingdom: Animalia
- Phylum: Arthropoda
- Class: Insecta
- Order: Lepidoptera
- Family: Lasiocampidae
- Genus: Quadrina; Grote, 1881
- Species: Q. diazoma

Binomial name
- Quadrina diazoma Grote, 1881

Genus of moths

Quadrina is a monotypic moth genus in the family Lasiocampidae described by Augustus Radcliffe Grote in 1881. Its single species, Quadrina diazoma, described by the same author in the same year, is found in the US states of Arizona and New Mexico.
