= Eremaea (moth) =

Scientific classification
- Kingdom: Animalia
- Phylum: Arthropoda
- Class: Insecta
- Order: Lepidoptera
- Family: Lasiocampidae
- Genus: Eremaea; Turner, 1915

Genus of moths

Eremaea is a genus of moths belonging to the family Lasiocampidae.

The species of this genus are found in Australia.

Species:

- Eremaea coralliphora (Lower, 1900)
- Eremaea zonospila (Lower, 1893)
