= Fauna of Nepal =

Native animals of Nepal

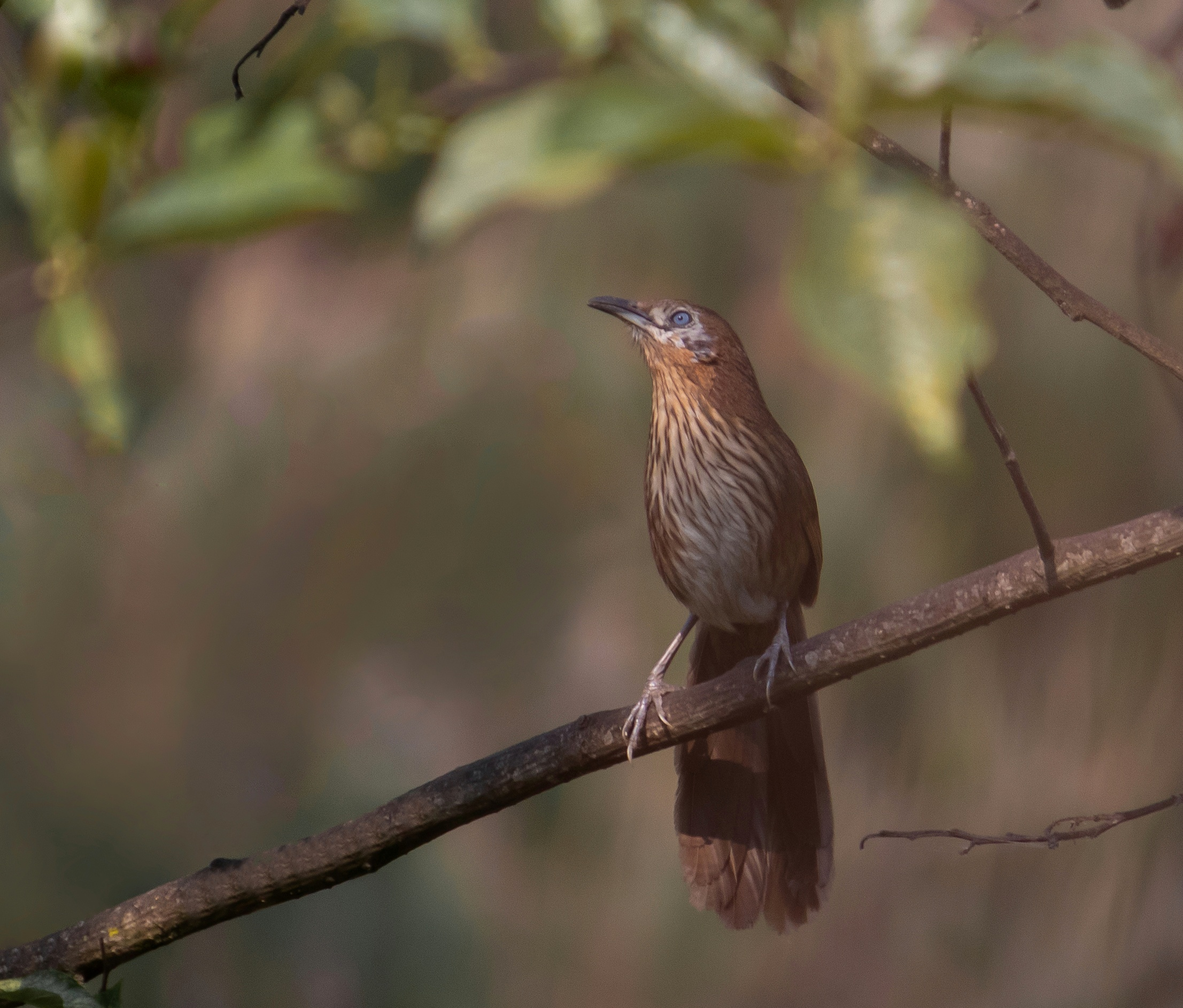
Spiny babbler - endemic bird of Nepal

The Fauna of Nepal includes 3.96% of mammals, 3.72% of butterflies and 8.9% of birds among the total number of species found in the world. The protected species in Nepal include 26 mammals, nine birds and three reptiles. The endemic fauna are: Himalayan field mouse, Spiny babbler, Nepali kalij, 14 herpetofauna, and six types of fishes.

== Taxonomic lists and indices ==
=== Vertebrates ===
- Birds of Nepal
- Mammals of Nepal
- Reptiles of Nepal
- Amphibians of Nepal

=== Invertebrates ===
- Butterflies of Nepal
- List of moths of Nepal (Bombycidae)
- List of moths of Nepal (Brahmaeidae)
- List of moths of Nepal (Drepanidae)
- List of moths of Nepal (Eupterotidae)
- List of moths of Nepal (Lasiocampidae)
- List of moths of Nepal (Limacodidae)
- List of moths of Nepal (Saturniidae)
- List of moths of Nepal (Sphingidae)
- List of moths of Nepal (Uraniidae)
- List of moths of Nepal (Zygaenidae)
- List of beetles of Nepal (Carabidae: Paussinae)
- List of beetles of Nepal (Cerambycidae)
- List of beetles of Nepal (Coccinellidae)
- List of bugs of Nepal (Scutelleridae)
- List of Odonata of Nepal
- Non-marine molluscs of Nepal

== See also ==
- Flora of Nepal
- Wildlife of Nepal
