= List of beetles of Nepal (Carabidae: Paussinae) =

The following is a list of beetles of subfamily Paussinae of the family Carabidae of Nepal. Sixteen different species are listed.

This list is primarily based on Peter Nagel's 2018 "Flanged Bombardier Beetles of Nepal (Insecta: Coleoptera: Carabidae: Paussinae), with nomenclatural and taxonomic notes and descriptions of new species".

== Tribe Ozaenini ==
- Eustra nageli
- Dhanya bioculata
- Itamus castaneus

== Tribe Protopaussini ==
- Protopaussus almorensis
- Protopaussus vignai

== Tribe Paussini ==
=== Subtribe Cerapterina ===
- Cerapterus quadrimaculatus

=== Subtribe Platyrhopalina ===
- Platyrhopalus denticornis
- Platyrhopalus acutidens
- Platyrhopalus paussoides

=== Subtribe Ceratoderina ===
- Ceratoderus bifasciatus
- Melanospilus chitwanensi

=== Subtribe Paussina ===
- Paussus hardwickii
- Paussus (Scaphipaussus) tibialis
- Paussus (Scaphipaussus) schiodtii
- Paussus (Scaphipaussus) cardoni
- Paussus (Paussus) yubaki

== See also ==
- List of butterflies of Nepal
- List of moths of Nepal (Bombycidae)
- List of moths of Nepal (Brahmaeidae)
- List of moths of Nepal (Drepanidae)
- List of moths of Nepal (Eupterotidae)
- List of moths of Nepal (Lasiocampidae)
- List of moths of Nepal (Limacodidae)
- List of moths of Nepal (Saturniidae)
- List of moths of Nepal (Sphingidae)
- List of moths of Nepal (Uraniidae)
- List of moths of Nepal (Zygaenidae)
- List of beetles of Nepal (Cerambycidae)
- List of beetles of Nepal (Coccinellidae)
- List of bugs of Nepal (Scutelleridae)
- List of Odonata of Nepal
