= List of moths of Nepal (Lasiocampidae) =

The following is a list of Lasiocampidae of Nepal. Fifty-six species are listed.

This list is primarily based on Colin Smith's 2010 Lepidoptera of Nepal, which is based on Toshiro Haruta's Moths of Nepal (Vol. 1-6) with some recent additions and a modernized classification.

- Alompra ferruginea ferruginea
- Amurilla subpurpurea
- Argonestis flammans
- Arguda decurtata
- Arguda vinata nepalina
- Baodera khasiana
- Bharetta cinnamomea
- Chilena similis
- Cosmotriche discitincta szini
- Dendrolimus himalayanus
- Dendrolimus phantom
- Euthrix decisa
- Euthrix inobtusa
- Euthrix isocyma
- Euthrix laeta
- Eteinopla signata
- Euthrix vulpes
- Gastropacha eberti
- Gastropacha encausta
- Gastropacha pardale
  - Gastropacha pardale philippinensis
- Gastropacha sikkima
- Gastropacha xenapates xenapates
- Kosala flavosignata
- Kunugia ampla
- Kunugia fulgens
- Kunugia latipennis
- Kunugia lineata
- Kunugia undans
- Lebeda nobilis nobilis
- Lebeda trifascia
- Lenodora castanea
- Lenodora semihyalina
- Malacosoma indica
- Malacosoma parallela
- Metanastria gemella
- Metanastria hyrtaca syn. Metanastria repanda
- Micropacha lidderdalii
- Odonestis bheroba
- Odonestis pruni
- Paradoxopla sinuata
- Paradoxopla undulifera
- Paralebeda femorata karmata
- Paralebeda plagifera syn. Paralebeda urda
- Pyrosis fulviplaga
- Pyrosis hreblayi
- Pyrosis sp. (unknown species from the east)
- Pyrosis undulosa
  - Pyrosis undulosa gadragana
- Radhica flavovittata
- Streblote dorsalis syn. Taragama igniflua
- Streblote siva
- Suana concolor
- Syrastrena lajonquieri fortelineata
- Syrastrena sumatrana sinensis
- Syrastrenopsis bilinea
- Trabala vishnou
  - Trabala vishnou f. viridis

== See also ==
- List of butterflies of Nepal
- Odonata of Nepal
- Cerambycidae of Nepal
- Wildlife of Nepal
