= List of moths of Nepal (Limacodidae) =

The following is a list of Limacodidae of Nepal. Fifty-seven different species are listed.

This list is primarily based on Colin Smith's 2010 "Lepidoptera of Nepal", which is based on Toshiro Haruta's "Moths of Nepal (Vol. 1-6)" with some recent additions and a modernized classification.

- Altha subnotata
- Althonarosa horisyaensis
- Aphendala cana
- Aphendala mechiensis
- Atosia himalayana
- Belippa horrida
- Belippa ochreata
- Belippa thoracica
- Caissa gambita
- Caissa medialis
- Cania himalayana
- Ceratonema retractata
- Chalcoscelides castaneipars
- Cheromettia apicata
- Dactylorhynchides rufibasale
- Dermonarosa rufotessellata
- Euphlyctinides albifuscum
- Hampsoniella marvelosa
- Hyphorma minax
- Mahanta quadrilinea
- Miresa argentifera
- Miresa bracteata
- Miresa decedens
- Monema coralina
- Narosa conspersa
- Nirmides cuprea
- Nephelimorpha argentilinea
- Parasa bicolor
- Parasa gentilis
- Parasa herbifera
- Paraas hilaris
- Paraas himalepida
- Parasa latifascia
- Parasa pastoralis
- Parasa punica
- Parasa repanda
- Phlossa conjuncta
- Phlossa crispa
- Phlossa fasciata
- Phocoderma velutina
- Phrixolepia similis
- Praesetora albitermina
- Praesetora divergens
- Prapata scotopepla
- Scopelodes testacea
- Scopelodes venosa
- Scopelodes vulpina
- Setora baibarana
- Setora postornata
- Squamosa ocellata
- Susica himalayana
- Susica pallida
- Tetrapleba brevilinia
- Thosea magna
- Thosea sevastropuloi
- Trichogyria circulifera
- Triplophleps inferma

== See also ==
- List of butterflies of Nepal
- Odonata of Nepal
- Cerambycidae of Nepal
- Zygaenidae of Nepal
- Wildlife of Nepal
