= Flora of Nepal =

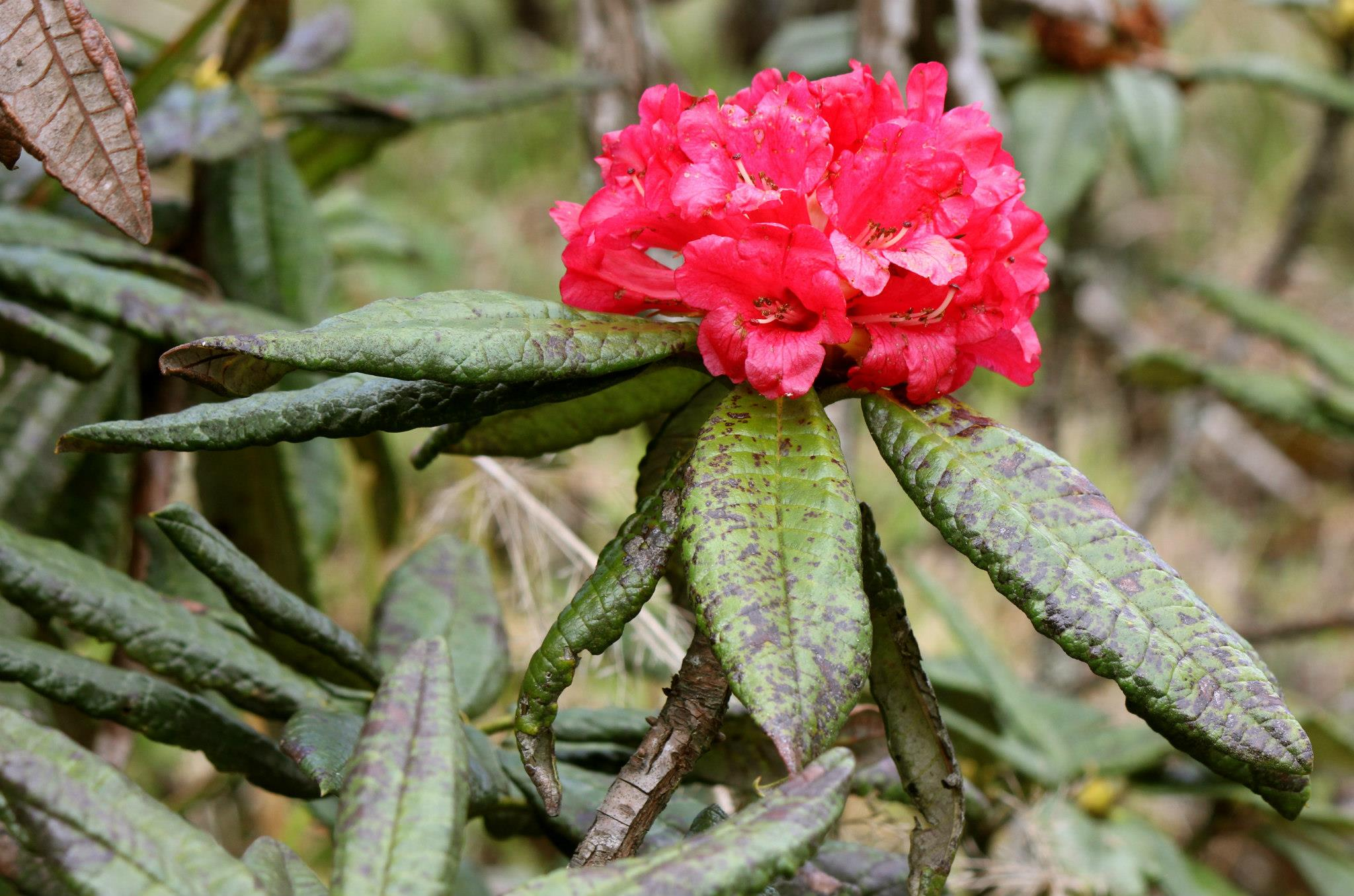
rhododendron (arboreum), the national flower of Nepal

The flora of Nepal is one of the richest in the world due to the diverse climate, topology and geography of the country. Research undertaken in the late 1970s and early 1980s documented 5067 species of which 5041 were angiosperms and the remaining 26 species were gymnosperms. The Terai area has hardwood, bamboo, palm, and sal trees. Notable plants include the garden angelica, Luculia gratissima, Meconopsis villosa, and Persicaria affinis. However, according to ICOMOS checklist (as of 2006), in the protected sites, there are 2,532 species of vascular plants under 1,034 genera and 199 families. The variation in figures is attributed to inadequate floral coverage filed studies. Some of the plants contain medicinal values. It contains certain chemical which is used to heal wound by There are 400 species of vascular plants which are endemic to Nepal. Of these, two in particular are orchids Pleione coronaria and Oreorchis porphyranthes. The most popular endemic plant of Nepal is rhododendron (arboreum) which in Nepali language is called lali guras.

== Human consumption ==
93% of human diet depend upon plants and remaining 7% of food rely on animals that directly or indirectly depends upon plants. Nepalese people consume plants according to the geographical structure of Nepal. Human consume seed, root, whole plants, flower as their food.

=== Seeds ===
Seeds consumed in Nepal usually are:

- Wheat
- Rice
- Barley
- Buckwheat
- Oats
- Maize
- Chickpea
- Pumpkin seed
- Millet
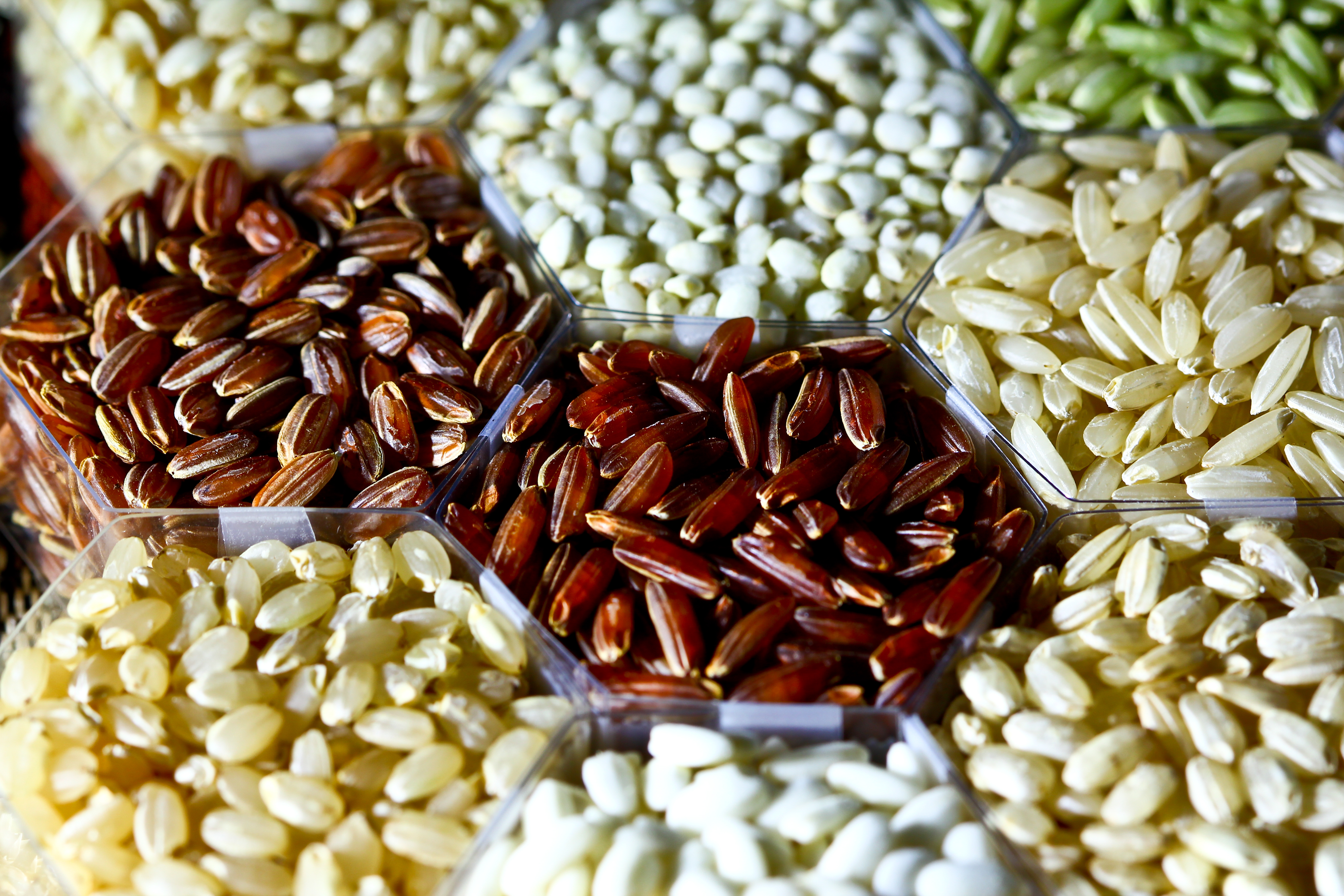
Rice

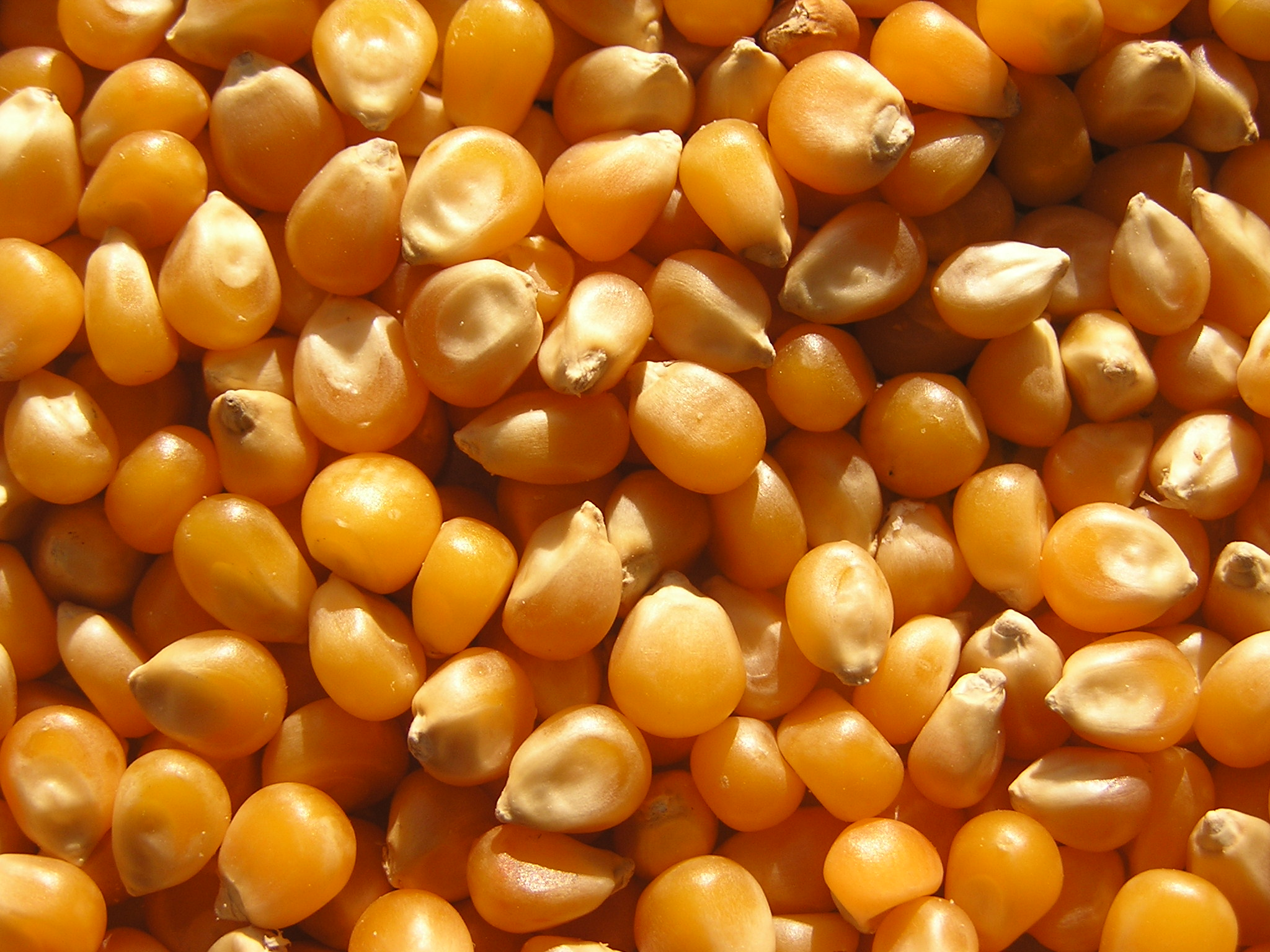
Maize

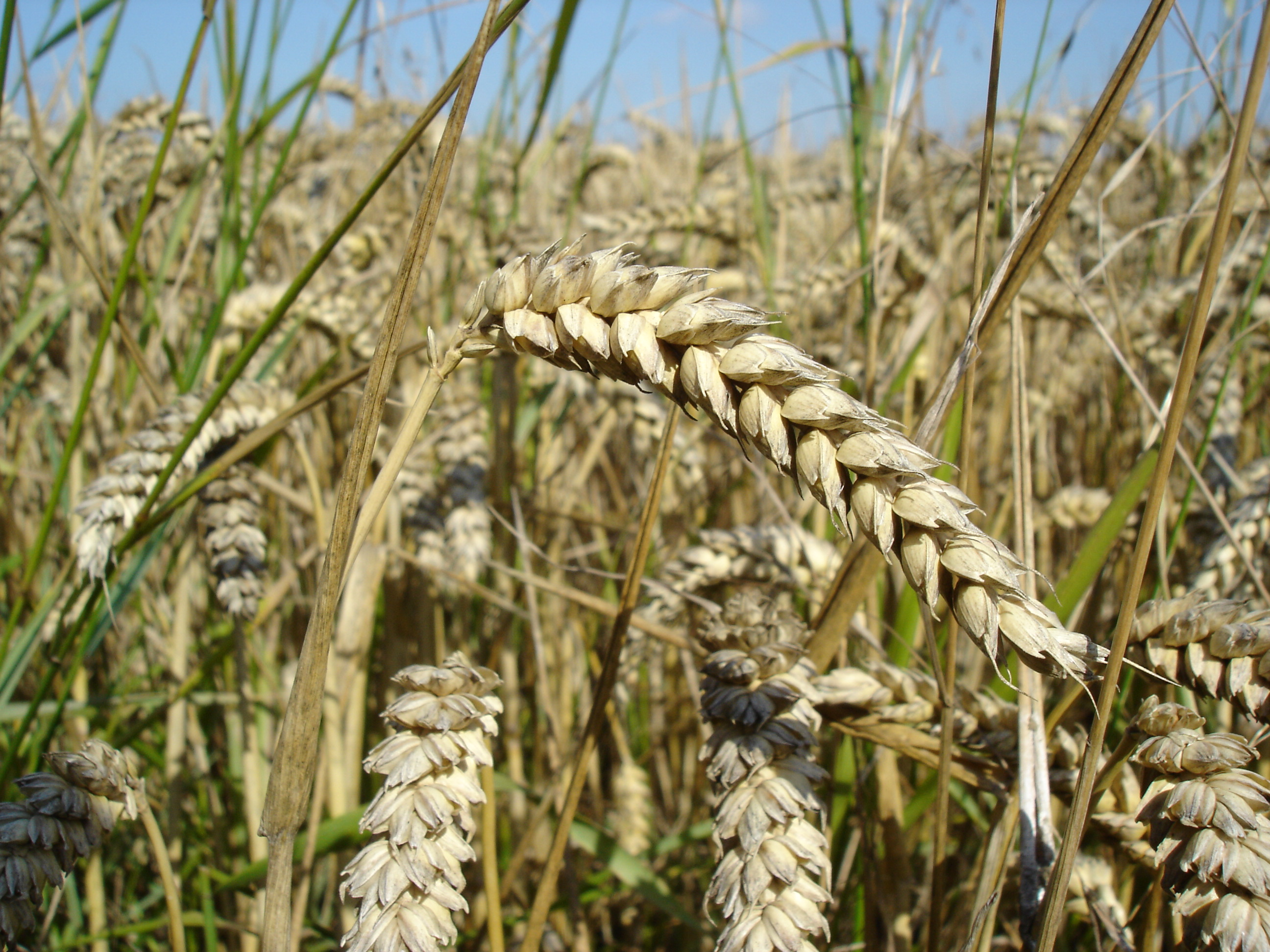
Wheat

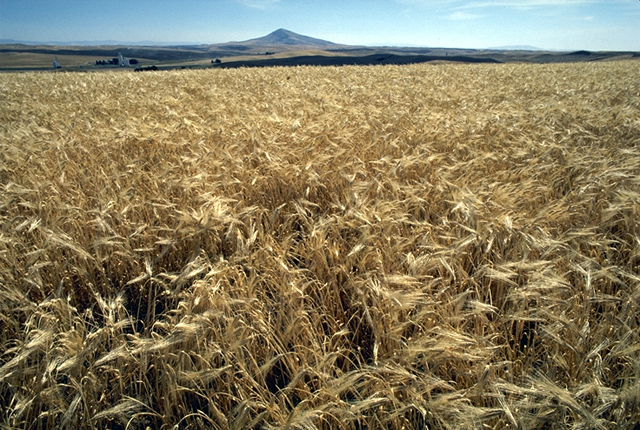
Barley

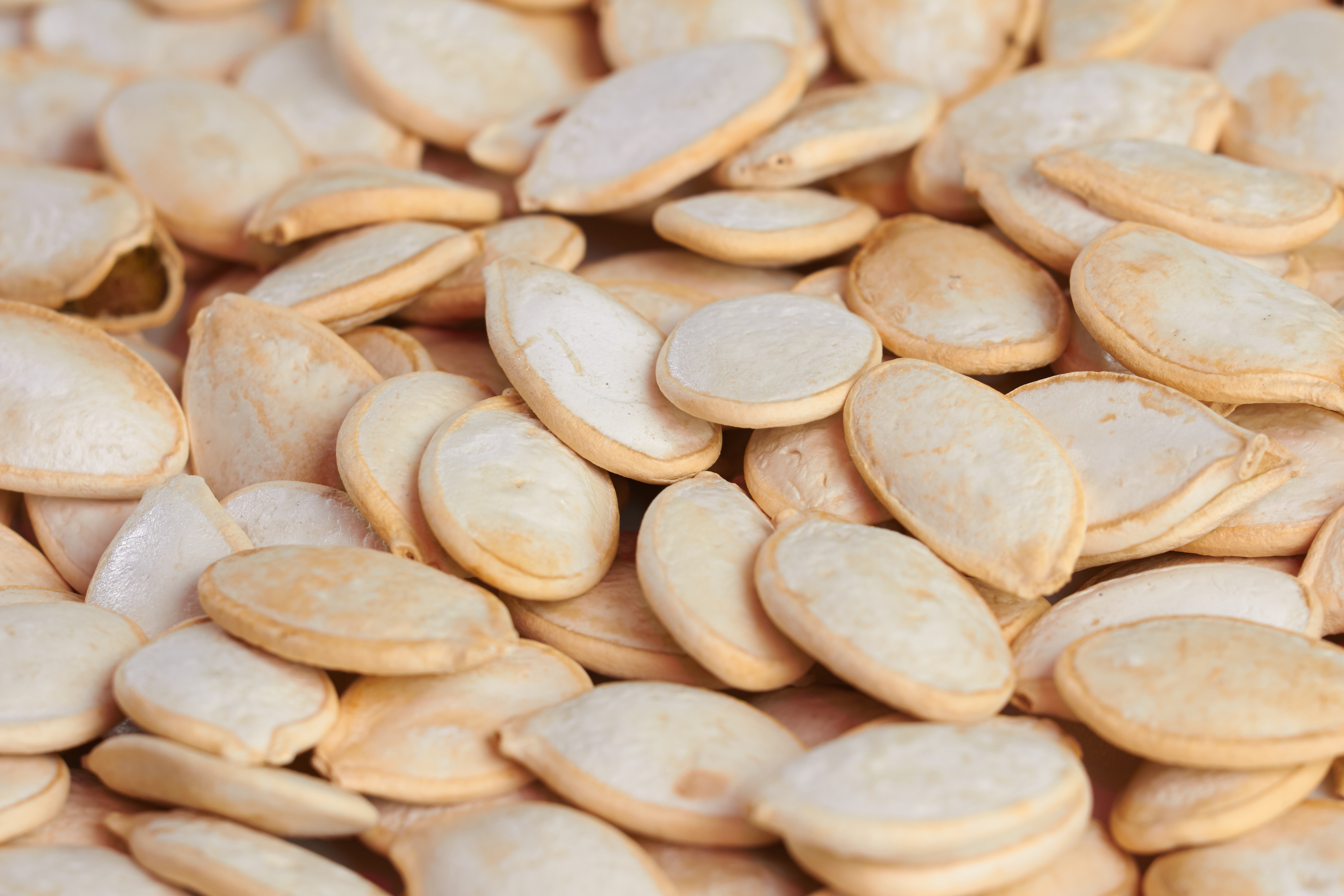
Pumpkin

=== Leaves ===
Leaves consumed in Nepal usually includes:

- Cabbage
- Spinach
- Mustard leaves
- Lettuce
- Mint

=== Fruits ===
Fruits of Nepal usually includes:

- Banana
- Apple
- Mango
- Guava
- Tomato

=== Roots ===
Some of the roots consumed as food in Nepal are:

- Potato
- Carrot
- Turnip
- Radish
- Beetroot

== Medical usage ==
Plants were the main source of therapy till the middle of the 19th century. More than 50% of world population depends on traditional medicine. There are between 1600 and 1900 plant species present in Nepal, and a large variety of them are frequently used in traditional medical practices. These plants are used for their medical benefits and have a profound cultural impact on the nation. The oldest repository that is known to record the medicinal plants used in the Himalayas is known as Rigveda (4500 BC and 1600 BC), which explained the medical usage of 67 plants. The Ayurveda (the foundation of science of life and the art of healing of Hindu culture) explain the therapeutic properties of 1200 plants.

S.N	Scientific name (family)	English name	Nepali Name	Part	Usage
1.	Abies spectabilis(Pinaceae)	Himalayan salla	Gobre salla	leaves	used to cure cough and cold
2.	Acacia catechu(Mimosaceae)	Cutch tree	Khair	wood	used to cure cough and cod
3.	Aconitum Ferox (Ranunculaceae)	Himalayan monkshook	Bikh	roots	paste is used for joint pain
4.	Aconitum heterophyllum (Ranunculaceae)	Aconites	Bish	rhizome	used to cure fever, body ache cold, cough, running nose etc.
5.	Aesculus indica (Sapindaceae)	Indian horse chestnut	Karu	seed	oil extracted from seed is used for joint pain skin
6.	Ageratum conyzoides(Asteraceae)	Ageratum	Gandhe Jhar	leaf	juice extracted is applied to cure wounds. docoction is also use for diarrhea, dysentery etc.
7.	Amaranthus spinosus(Amaranthaceae)	Prickly amaranth	Bagani dhap	root	paste is applied to heal cuts and wounds
8.	Andrographis paniculata(Acanthaceae)	Kalmegh	Kariyat	whole plant	Plant juice is used to cure infections
9.	Acorus calamus L. (Araceae)	Sweet flag	Bojho	root	paste is used to heal wounds in cattles
10.	Ageratum conyzoides L.(Asteraceae)	Goat weed	Gandhe jhar	leaf	juice is used to cure wounds
11.	Aloe Barbadensis Miller Asphodelaceae(Lilaceae)	Aloe vera	Ghiu kumari	leaf	gel extracted from leaf is applied to heal wounds
12.	Artemisia dubia Wall. ex Besser (Asteraceae)	Mugwort	Titepati	leaf and rhizome	applied on wounds to stop bleeding
13.	Azadirachta indica A. Juss (Meliaceae)	Margosa	Neem	leaf	leaf decoction is applied to wounds of cattle and human
14.	Cannabis sativa L. (Cannabineae)	Hemp	Bhang	Leaf	extracted juice from leaf applied to wounds
15.	Centella Asiatical(l.) Urb.	Pennywort	Ghodtapre	leaf	juice is used to treat wounds
16.	Curcuma Augustifolia Roxb. (Zingiberaceae)	Turmeric	Beshar	root	paste made of turmeric powder and oil is applied to wounds
17.	Cynodon dactylon(L.) Pers. (Poaceae)	Bermuda grass	Dubo	whole plant	paste of whole plant is applied to wounds
18.	Jatropha curcas L.(Euphoriaceae)	Physic nut	Saruwa	Latex	Latex is used to care gums infection
19.	Ocimum tenuflorum L. (Lamiaceae)	Holy basil	Tulashi	leaf	leaf juice is applied to wounds
20.	Oxalis corniculata L. (Oxalidaceae)	Indian sorrel	Chari amilo	plant	the juice of the plant is applied to heal wounds

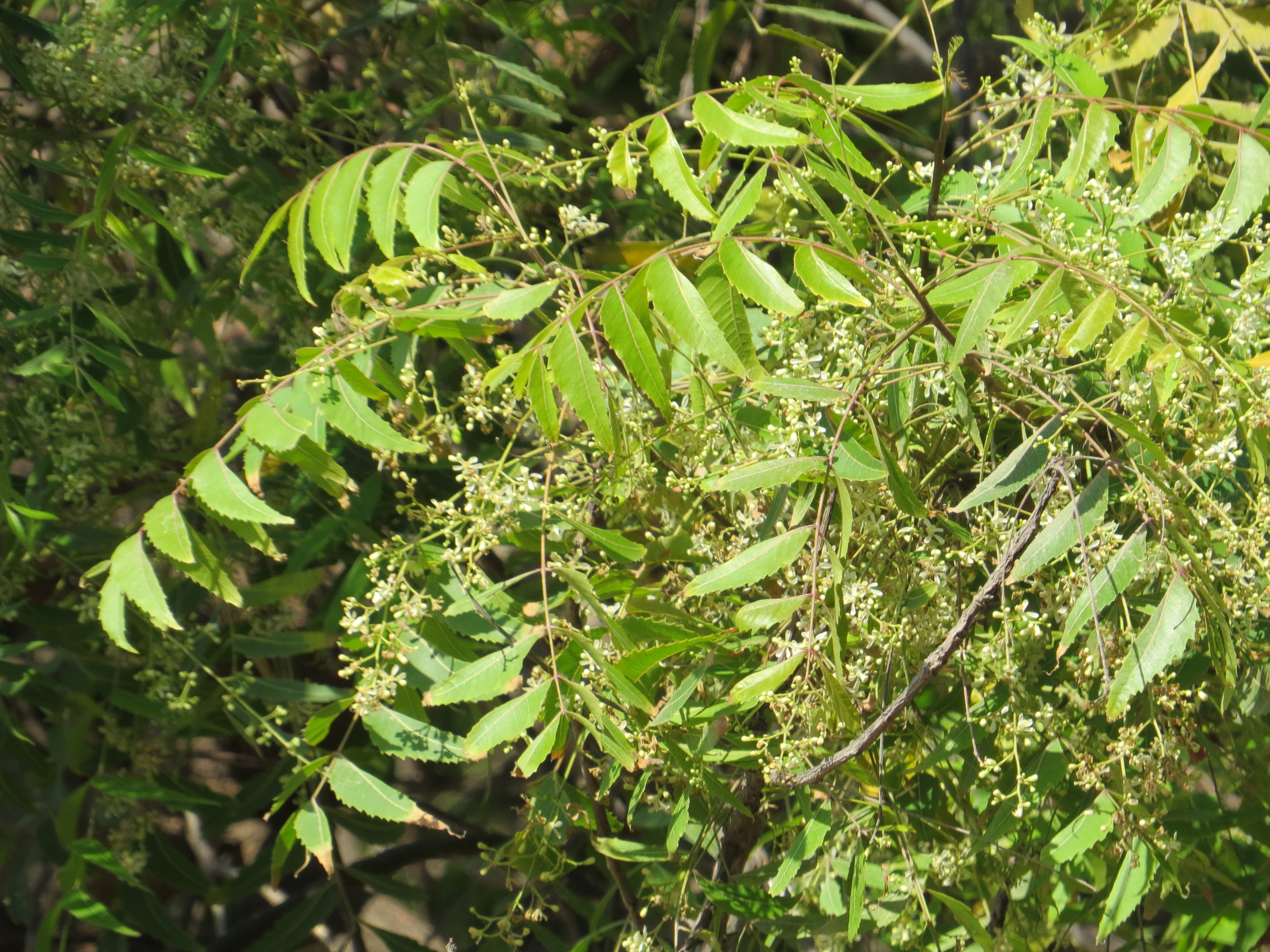
Azadirachta indica

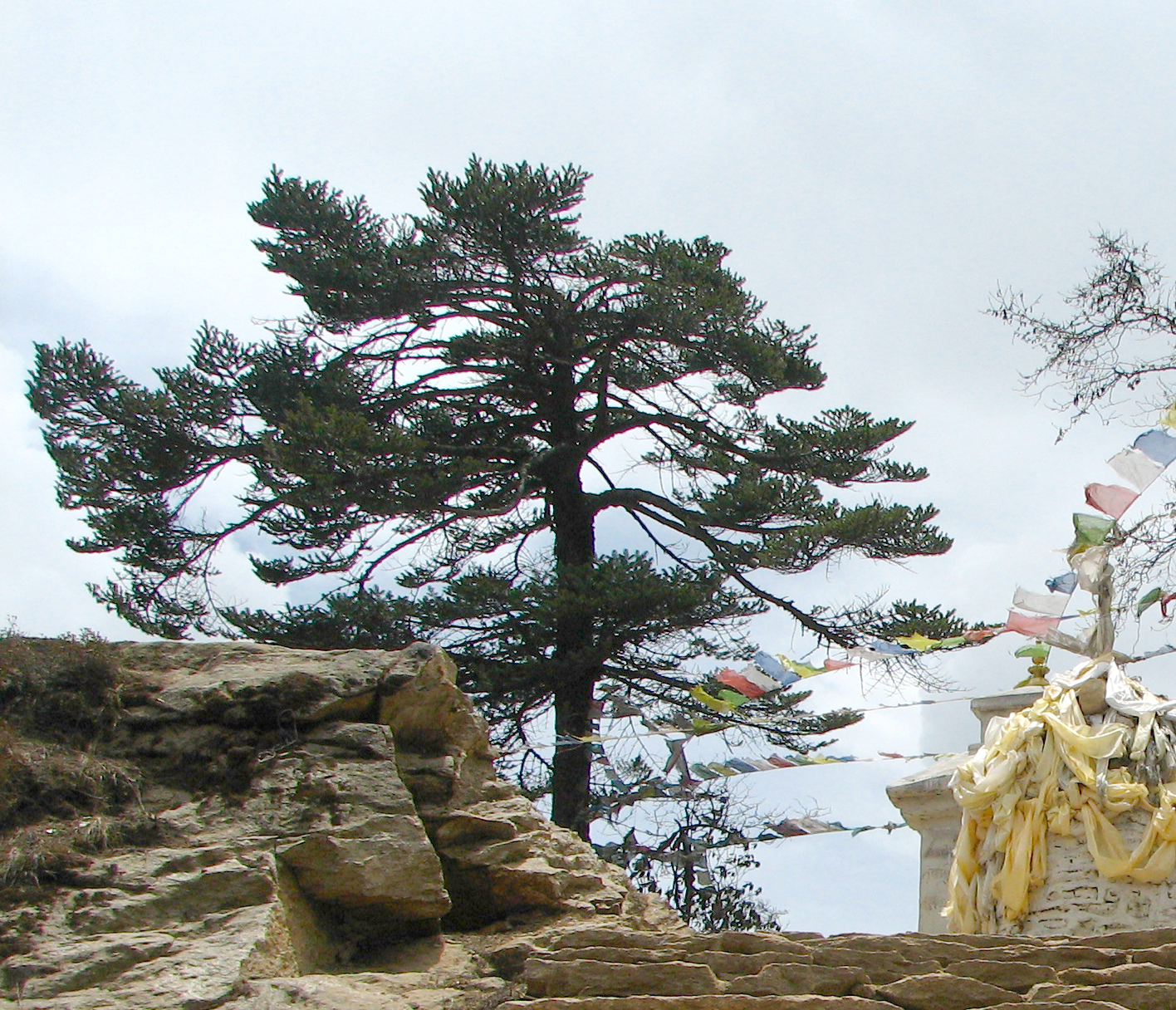
Abies spectabiis

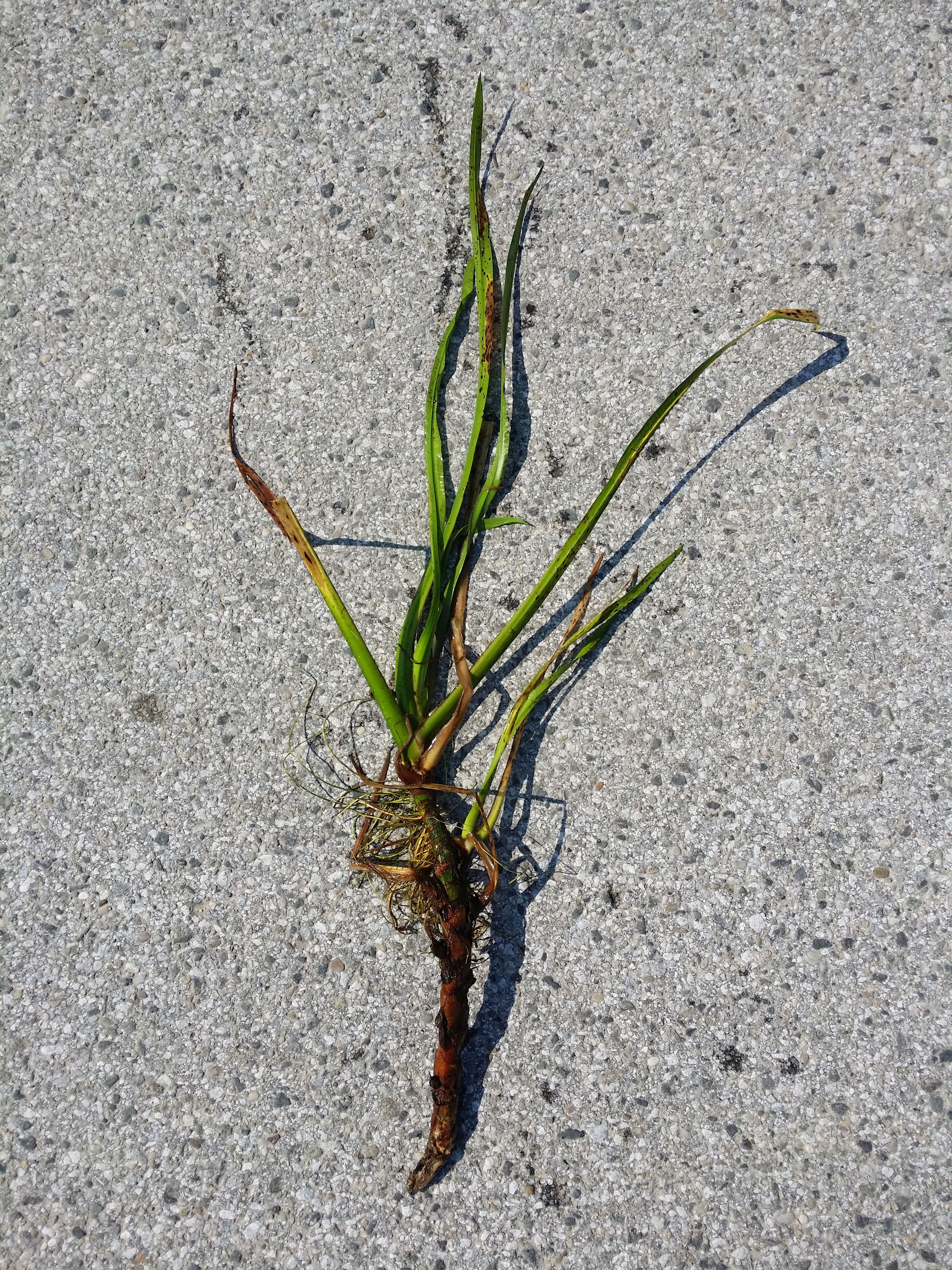
Acorus calamus

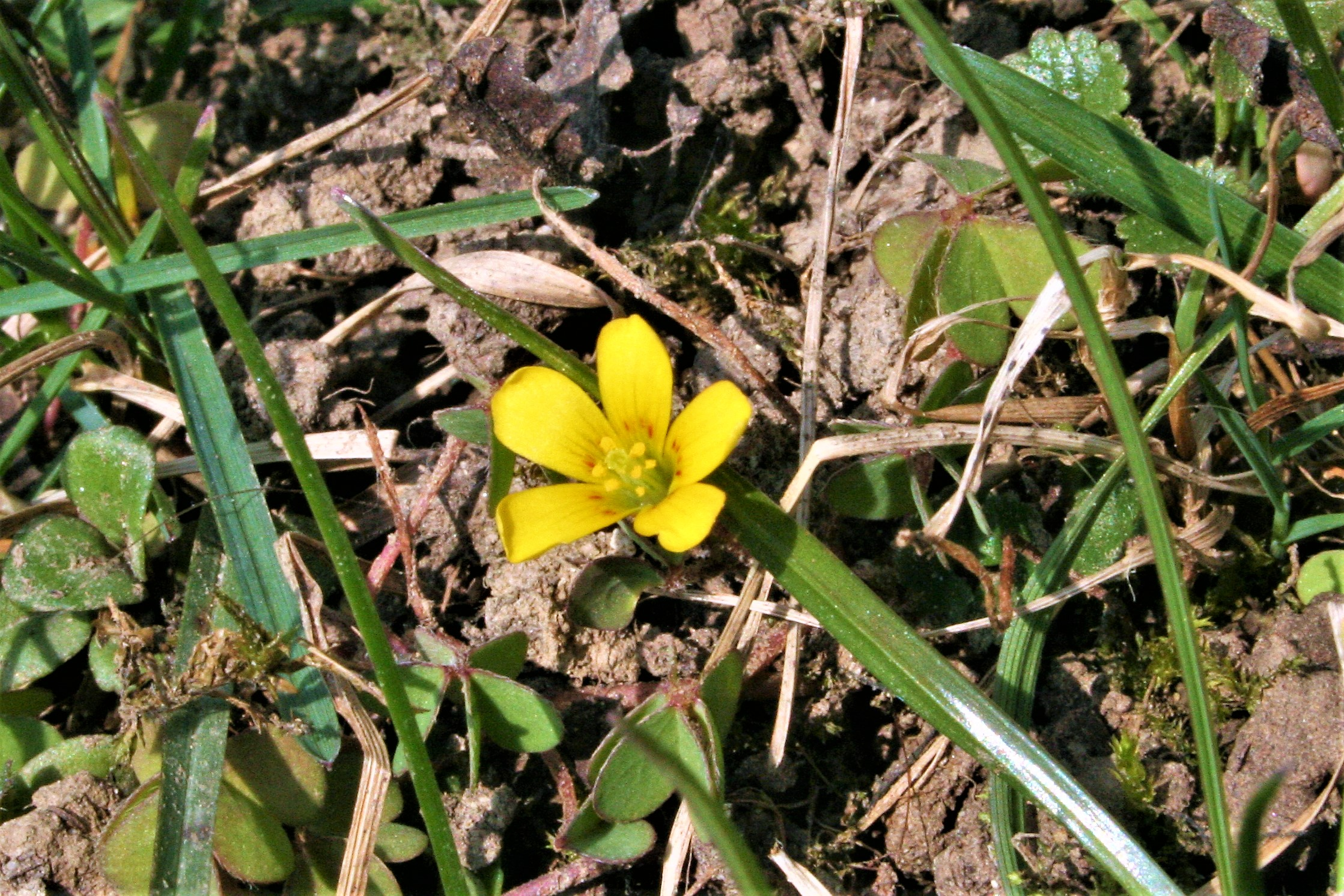
Oxalis corniculata

=== Spices ===
Herbs and spices are food additives used to enhance taste, color, aroma and to preserve food. Most of the spices have health benefits and are used as traditional medicine. Following are the list of plants used as spices

S.N	Scientific name (Family)	English name	Nepali Name	part use as spices
1.	Acorus calamus L. (Acoraceae)	Sweet flag	Bojo	leaves, steam and rhizomes
2.	Allium hypsistum stearn (Amarylidaceae)	Jimbu	Jimbhu	Dried leaves
3.	Allium sativum L. (Amarylidaceae)	Garlic	Lasun	Leaves and cloves
4.	Allium cepa L. (Amarylidaceae)	Onion	Pyaj	Leaf and bulb
5.	Amomum subulatum Roxb. (Zingiberaceae)	Black cardamom	Alichi	Dried seed
6.	Cinnamomum tamala (Buch.-Ham.) T.Nees &Eberm (Lauceae)	Bay leaf	Tejpat	fresh or dried leaf
7.	Cinnamomum verum J. Presl (LAuraceae)	Cinnamon	Dalchini	Dried bark
8.	Coriandrum sativum L. (Apiaceae)	Coriander	Dhaniya	Fresh leaves and dried seed
9.	Cuminum cyminum L. (Apiaceae)	Cummin	Jeera	Seed
10.	Curcuma Longa L. (Zingiberaceae)	Turmeric	Besar	rhizome
11.	Elettaria cardamomum L. Maton (Zingiberaceae)	True cardamom	Sukmel	dried seed
12.	Ferula assa-foetida L. (Apiaceae)	Asafetida	Hing	rhizome
13	Mentha arvensis L. (Lamiaceae)	Wild mint	pudina/barbari	leaves
14.	Myristica fragrans Houtt. (Myristicaceae)	Nutmeg	Jaiphal	seed
15.	Nigella sativa L. (Rananculaceae)	Black cumin	Mungrelo	seed
16.	Piper nigrum L. (Piperaceae)	Black pepper	Marich	fruit
17.	Sesamum indicum L. (Pedaliaceae)	Sesame	Til	seed
18.	Syzygium aromaticum (L.)Merr. & L.M. Perry	Clove	Lwang	flower bud
19.	Trigonella foenumgraecum L. (Fabaceae)	Fenugreek	Methi	dried fruits
20.	Zingiber officinale Roscoe(Zingiberaceae)	Ginger	Aduwa	fresh and dried rhizome

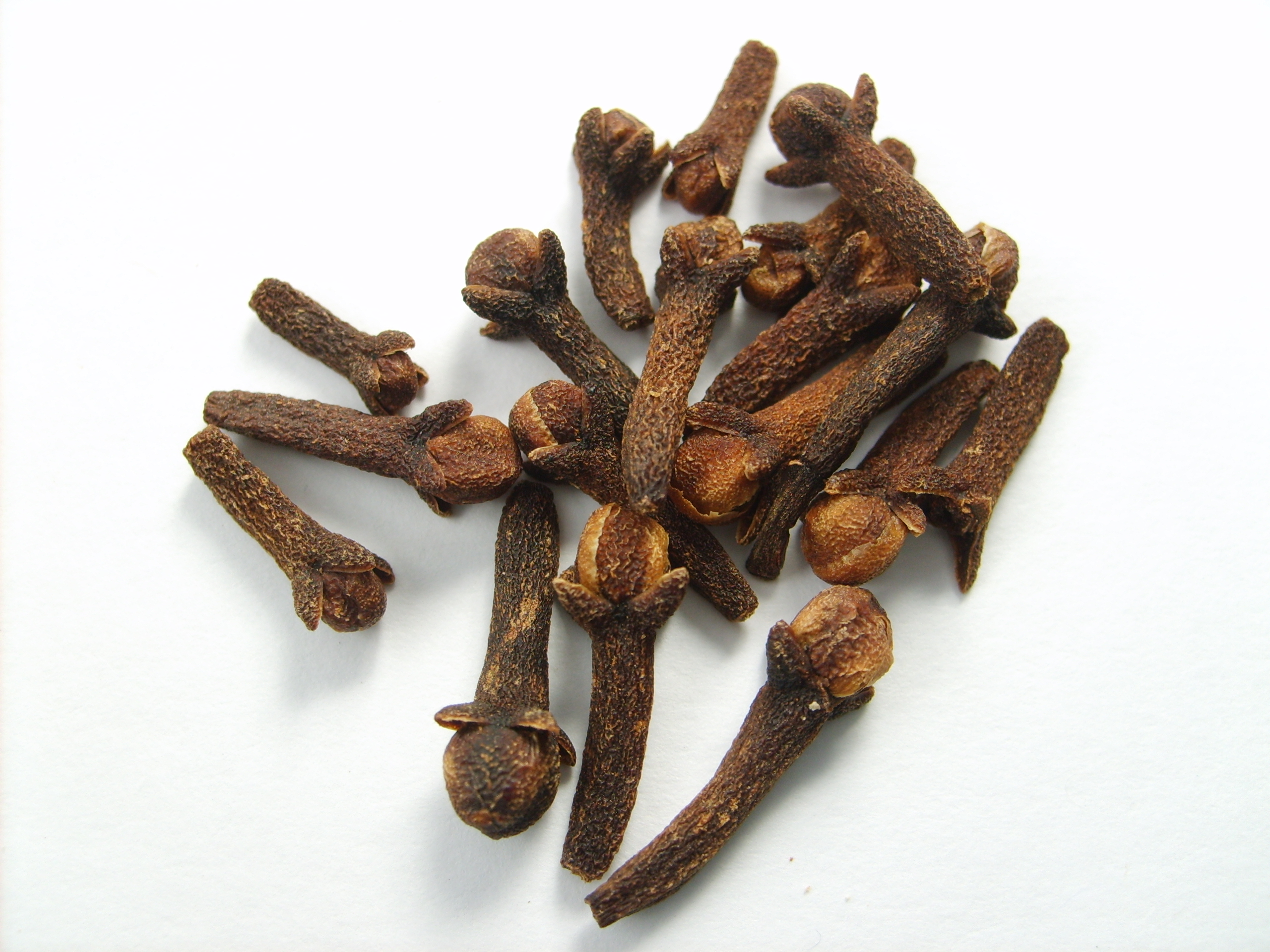
Syzygium aromaticum

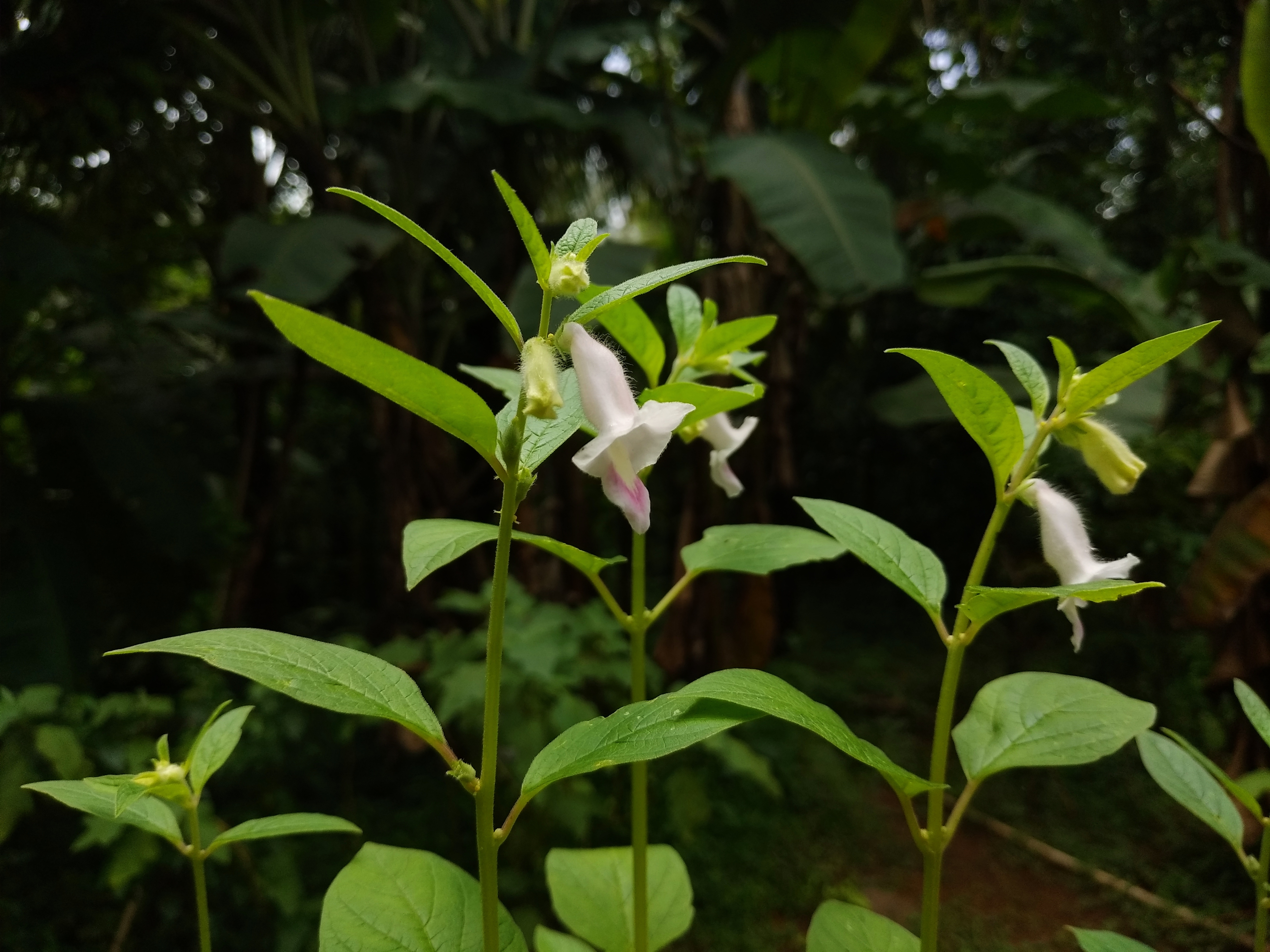
Sesamum indicum L.

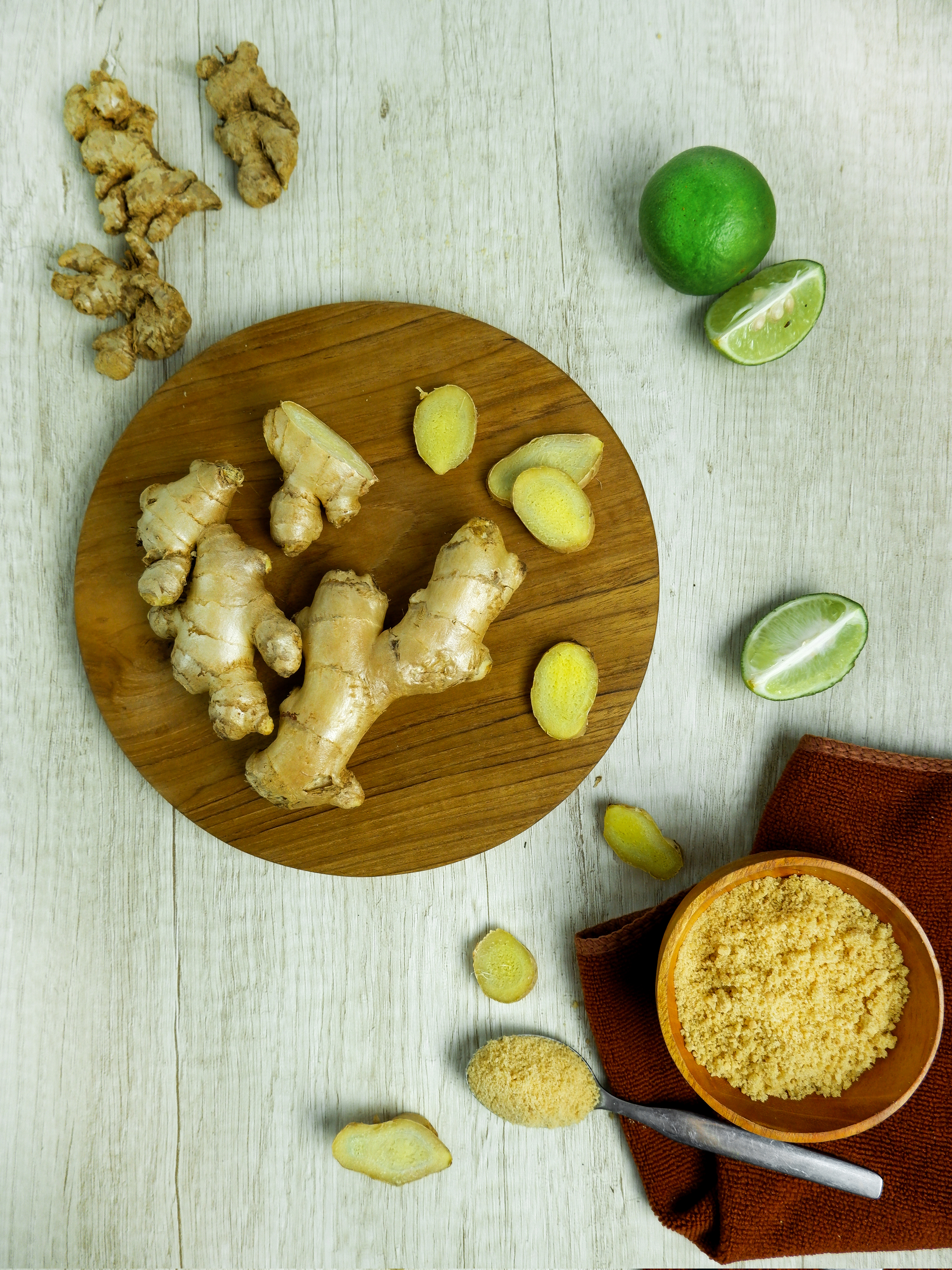
Zingiber officinale

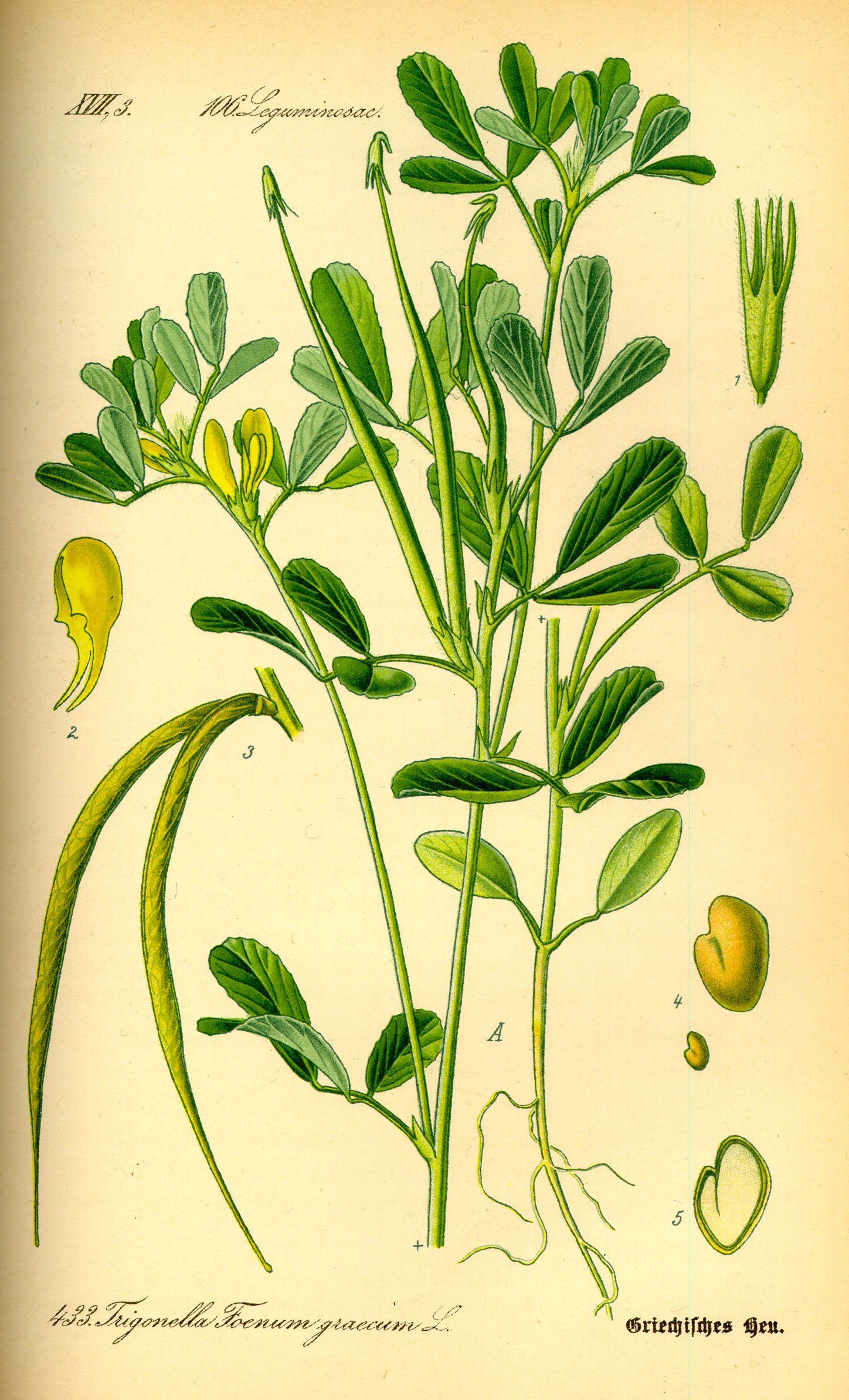
Trigonella foenumgraecum L.

== See also ==
- Fauna of Nepal
- Wildlife of Nepal
