= List of moths of Nepal (Uraniidae) =

The following is a list of moths of the family Uraniidae of Nepal. Twenty-three different species are listed.

This list is primarily based on Colin Smith's 2010 "Lepidoptera of Nepal", which is based on Toshiro Haruta's "Moths of Nepal (Vol. 1-6)" with some recent additions and a modernized classification.

== Subfamily Auzeinae ==
- Auzea arenosa
- Auzea rufifrontata
- Dirades theclata

== Subfamily Epipleminae ==
- Epiplema adamantina
- Epiplema arcuata
- Epiplema bicaudata
- Epiplema fulvilinea
- Epiplema fuscifrons
- Epiplema himala
- Epiplema indignaria
- Epiplema nivea
- Epiplema ocusta
- Epiplema puncticulosa
- Epiplema restricta
- Epiplema reticulata
- Epiplema ruptaria
- Gathynia simulans
- Metorthocheilus emarginata
- Orudiza protheclaria
- Paradecetia albistellaria

== Subfamily Microniinae ==
- Micronia aculeata
- Micronia simplicata

== Subfamily Uraniinae ==
- Lyssa zampa zampa

== See also ==
- List of butterflies of Nepal
- Odonata of Nepal
- Cerambycidae of Nepal
- Wildlife of Nepal
