= List of moths of Nepal (Saturniidae) =

The following is a list of Saturniidae of Nepal. Twenty-three different species are listed.

This list is primarily based on Colin Smith's 2010 "Lepidoptera of Nepal", which is based on Toshiro Haruta's "Moths of Nepal (Vol. 1-6)" with some recent additions and a modernized classification.

- Attacus atlas
- Archaeoattacus edwardsii
- Samia canningi
- Actias maenas
- Actias selene
- Antheraea assamensis
- Antheraea frithi
  - Antheraea frithi f. pedunculata
- Antheraea helferi f. pernyi
- Antheraea helferi f. roylei
- Loepa diversiocellata
- Loepa katinka
- Loepa miranda
- Loepa sikkima
- Rhodinia newara
- Cricula trifenestrata
- Caligula anna
- Caligula grotei
- Caligula lindia
- Caligula simla
- Caligula thibeta
- Saturnia zuleika
- Saturnia cidosa
- Salassa lola
- Salassa royi

== See also ==
- List of butterflies of Nepal
- Odonata of Nepal
- Cerambycidae of Nepal
- Zygaenidae of Nepal
- Wildlife of Nepal
