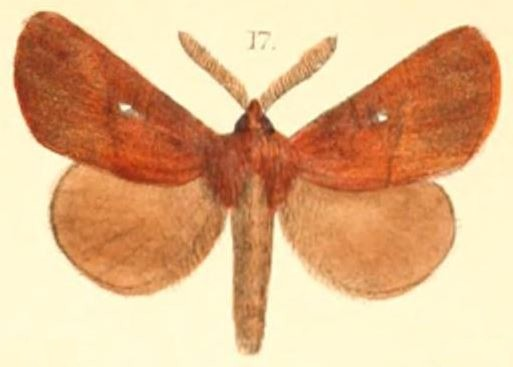
- Kosala flavosignata

Scientific classification
- Domain: Eukaryota
- Kingdom: Animalia
- Phylum: Arthropoda
- Class: Insecta
- Order: Lepidoptera
- Family: Lasiocampidae
- Genus: Kosala; Moore, 1879

Type species
- Kosala sanguinea Moore 1879

= Kosala (moth) =

Genus of moths

Kosala is a genus of moths in the family Lasiocampidae. The genus was erected by Frederic Moore in 1879.

== Species ==
- Kosala flavosignata (Moore, 1879) (India, Vietnam)
- Kosala kadoi Hauenstein, S. Ihle, Sinjaev & Zolotuhin, 2011 (Bhutan)
- Kosala reducta Zolotuhin & Witt, 2000 (Vietnam)
- Kosala rufa Hampson, 1892 (Thailand)
- Kosala sanguinea Moore, 1879 (India, Thailand)
