= List of moths of Nepal (Brahmaeidae) =

The following is a list of Brahmaeidae of Nepal. Only two different species are known.

This list is primarily based on Colin Smith's 2010 "Lepidoptera of Nepal", which is based on Toshiro Haruta's "Moths of Nepal (Vol. 1-6)" with some recent additions and a modernized classification.

- Brahmaea hearseyi
- Brahmaea wallichii

== See also ==
- List of butterflies of Nepal
- Odonata of Nepal
- Cerambycidae of Nepal
- Wildlife of Nepal
