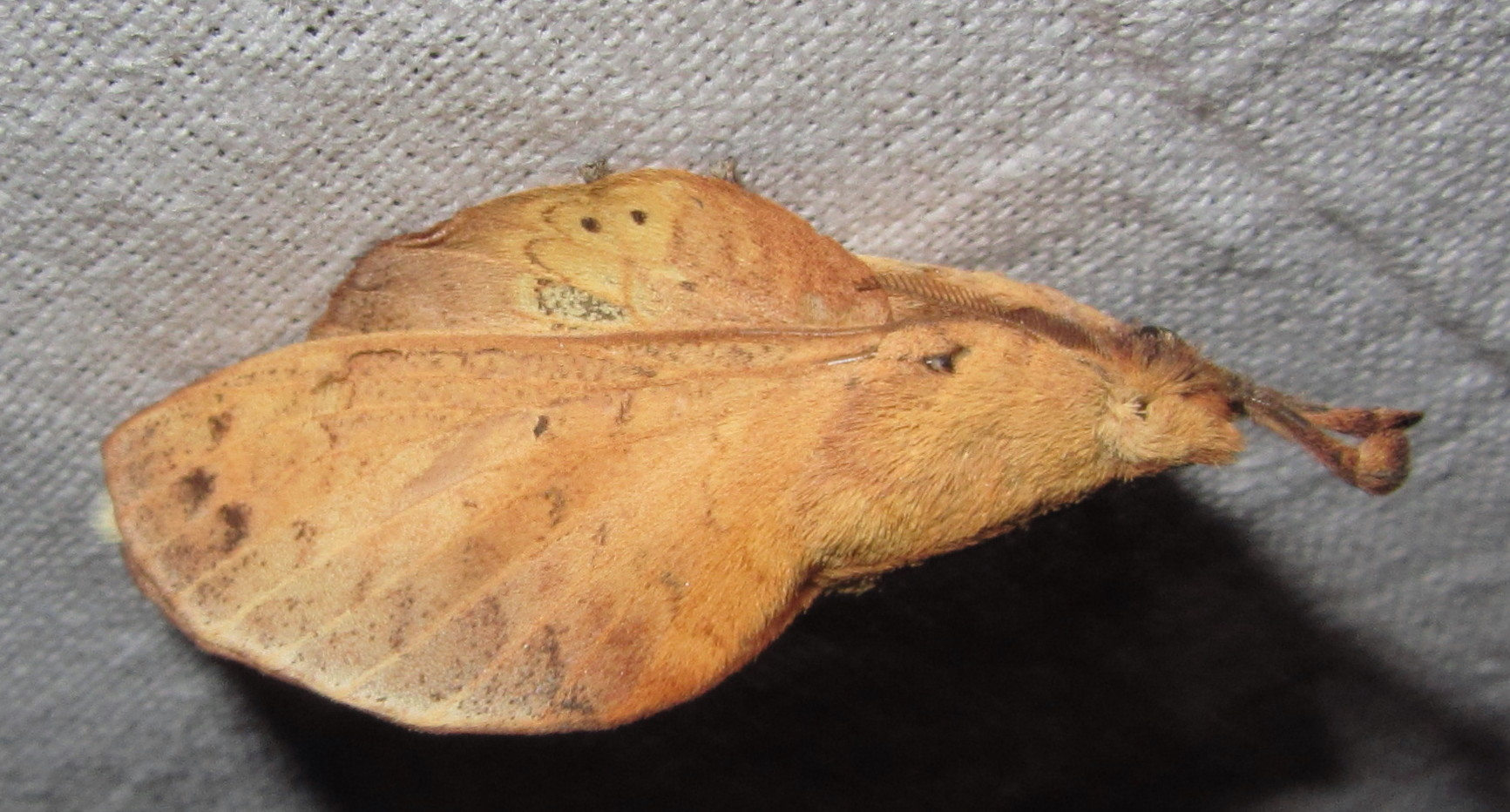
- Gastropacha pardale - Langka, East Kameng, Arunachal Pradesh, India 12 April 2012

Scientific classification
- Kingdom: Animalia
- Phylum: Arthropoda
- Class: Insecta
- Order: Lepidoptera
- Family: Lasiocampidae
- Genus: Gastropacha
- Species: G. pardale

Binomial name
- Gastropacha pardale Walker, 1855

Synonyms
- Lebeda scriptiplaga Walker, 1865; Gastropacha abstracta Walker 1865

= Gastropacha pardale =

Species of moth

Gastropacha pardale, the brown lapped moth, is a moth of the family Lasiocampidae. The species was first described by Francis Walker in 1855.

== Distribution ==
It is found in South Asian countries like India, Sri Lanka, towards Russian Far-east of China, Hong Kong to South East Asian Indonesia and some parts of the Middle East.

== Description ==
Head and thorax are red brown, with a dark stripe on the vertex. Abdomen pale reddish brown. Pale ochreous-brown forewings are narrow and long with a rounded outer margin. Four indistinct waved dark lines suffused. There is a black speck at end of cell. Hindwings ochreous or red brown with three indistinct waved lines in inner area. A large ochreous patch can be found below the costa. Palpi are slender, very long and black. Antennae pectinate (comb like). Legs possess minute spurs. Sexes dimorphic, where female lack the ochreous patch on the hindwing.

The caterpillar is a voracious leaf eater which feeds on Cinnamomum camphora, Mangifera, Erythrina, Albizia, Camellia, Crataegus and Pyracantha species. The mature larva is about 7 cm in length. It is dull brown with creamy tufts of hairs at the sides. Its life cycle is about 38–51 days and usually ranges from September to October.

== Subspecies ==
Nine subspecies are recognized.

- Gastropacha pardale andamana Tams, 1935
- Gastropacha pardale formosana Tams, 1935
- Gastropacha pardale koniensis Tams, 1935
- Gastropacha pardale leopoldi Tams, 1935
- Gastropacha pardale nandina Moore, 1859
- Gastropacha pardale pardale Tams, 1935
- Gastropacha pardale philippinensis Tams, 1935
- Gastropacha pardale sinensis Tams, 1935
- Gastropacha pardale swanni Tams, 1935
