= Nebria molendai =

Scientific classification
- Domain: Eukaryota
- Kingdom: Animalia
- Phylum: Arthropoda
- Class: Insecta
- Order: Coleoptera
- Suborder: Adephaga
- Family: Carabidae
- Genus: Nebria
- Species: N. molendai

Binomial name
- Nebria molendai Huber & Schmidt, 2007

Species of beetle

Nebria molendai is a species of black coloured ground beetle in the Nebriinae subfamily that is endemic to Rolwaling valley, Nepal.
