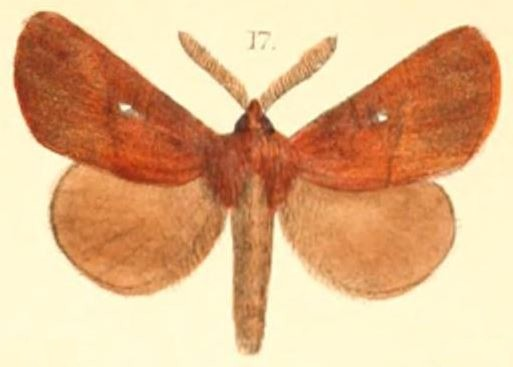

Scientific classification
- Domain: Eukaryota
- Kingdom: Animalia
- Phylum: Arthropoda
- Class: Insecta
- Order: Lepidoptera
- Family: Lasiocampidae
- Genus: Kosala
- Species: K. flavosignata

Binomial name
- Kosala flavosignata (Moore, 1879)

Synonyms
- Eutricha flavosignata Moore, 1879

= Kosala flavosignata =

Species of moth

Kosala flavosignata is a moth of the family Lasiocampidae. It is found in India, Vietnam and China.
