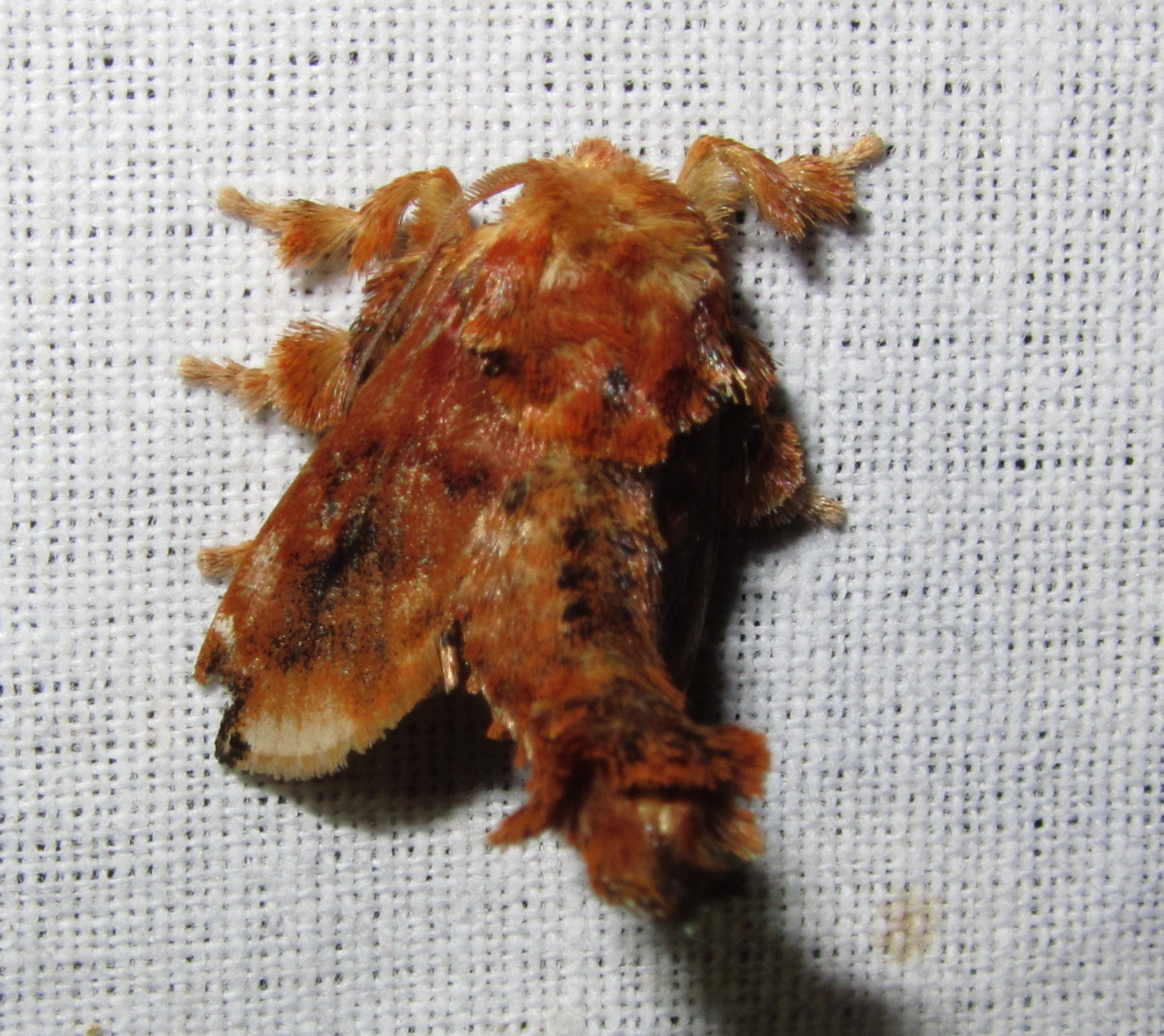

Scientific classification
- Kingdom: Animalia
- Phylum: Arthropoda
- Class: Insecta
- Order: Lepidoptera
- Family: Limacodidae
- Genus: Cheromettia
- Species: C. apicata

Binomial name
- Cheromettia apicata (Moore, 1879)

Synonyms
- Parasa laleana Moore, 1859; Belippa laleana Moore, 1859

= Cheromettia apicata =

Species of moth

Cheromettia apicata is a moth of the family Limacodidae first described by Frederic Moore in 1879. It is found in Oriental tropics such as Sri Lanka and India.

Larval host plants are Camellia sinensis, Ceiba pentandra, Cocos nucifera, Gliricidia sepium, Schleichera oleosa, Schleichera trijuga, Vernicia fordii, Aleurites fordii, Butea monosperma, Coffea arabica, Derris elliptica, Juglans regia Pyrus communis, Theobroma cacao, Toona ciliata and Malus pumila.
