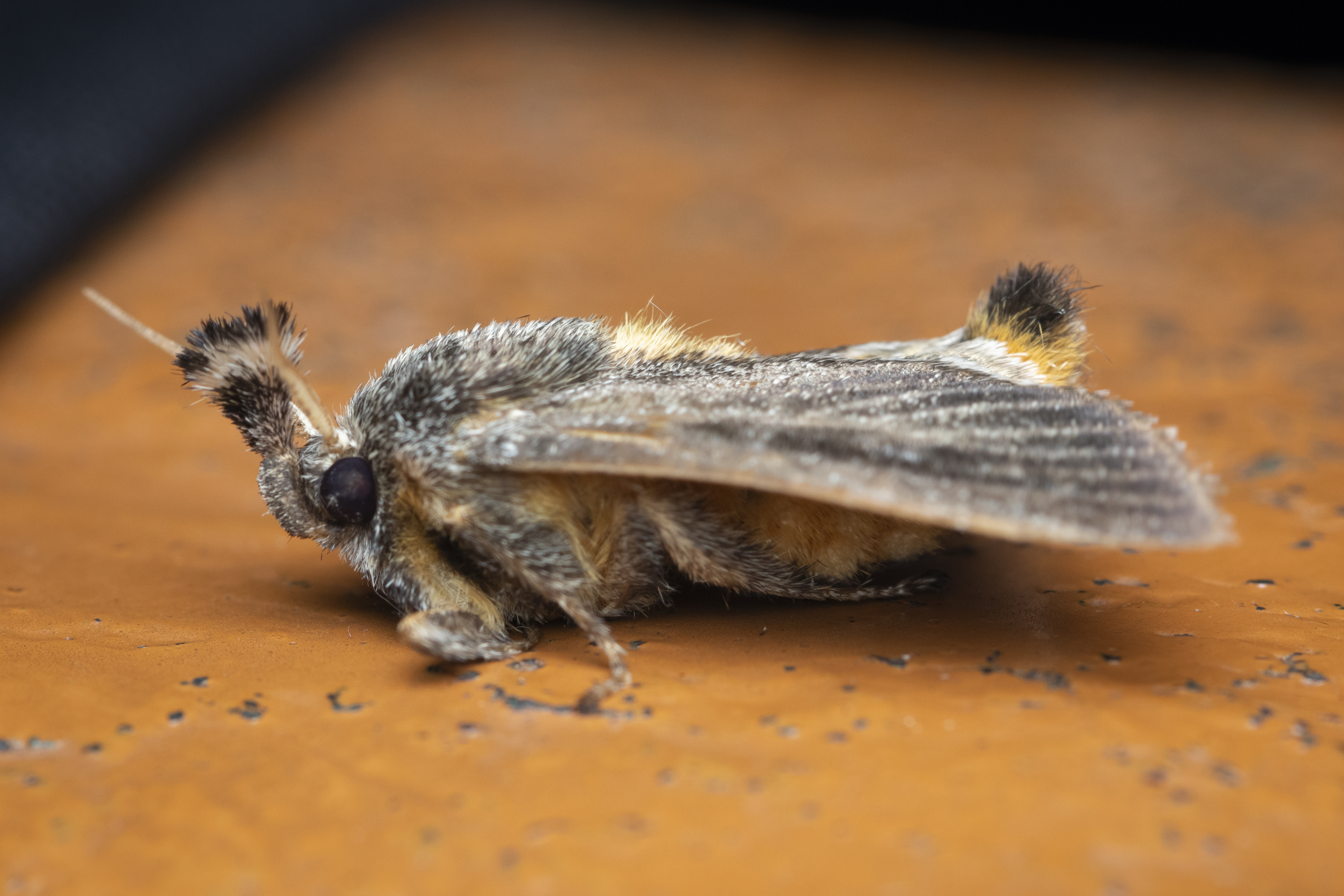

Scientific classification
- Kingdom: Animalia
- Phylum: Arthropoda
- Clade: Pancrustacea
- Class: Insecta
- Order: Lepidoptera
- Family: Limacodidae
- Genus: Scopelodes
- Species: S. venosa

Binomial name
- Scopelodes venosa Walker, 1855

Synonyms
- Scopelodes aurogrisea Moore, 1883; Scopelodes brunnea Hering, 1931

= Scopelodes venosa =

Species of moth

Scopelodes venosa is a moth of the family Limacodidae, first described by Francis Walker in 1855. It is found in Sri Lanka, China, India, northern Myanmar, northern Thailand, northern Laos, Vietnam and Nepal.

The caterpillar is yellowish green, and its body is semiovoid, flat dorsally. There are diamond-shaped markings with dark green edges on its dorsum. Black lines run on most lateral ridges on segments. The tip of lateral tubercle is jet black.

A single subspecies is recorded - Scopelodes venosa kwangtungensis Hering, 1931.
