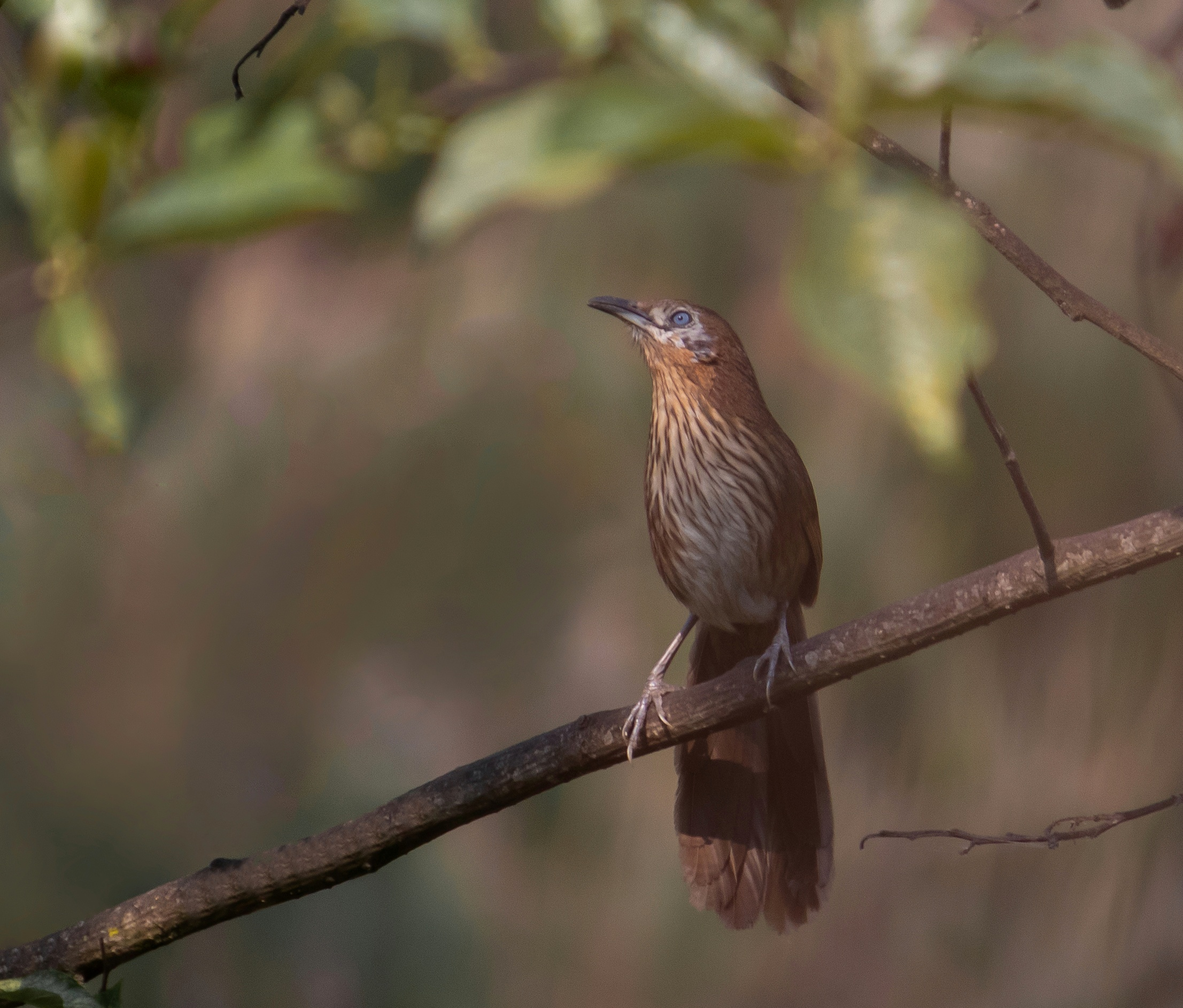
- Spiny babbler in Shivapuri Nagarjun NP

Conservation status
- Least Concern (IUCN 3.1)

Scientific classification
- Kingdom: Animalia
- Phylum: Chordata
- Class: Aves
- Order: Passeriformes
- Family: Leiothrichidae
- Genus: Turdoides
- Species: T. nipalensis

Binomial name
- Turdoides nipalensis (Hodgson, 1836)

Synonyms
- Timalia nipalensis Acanthoptila nipalensis

= Spiny babbler =

Species of bird

The spiny babbler (Turdoides nipalensis) is a species of bird in the family Leiothrichidae. Found only in the Middle Hills of Nepal, it can for example be seen around the Kathmandu valley, specifically around the Godavari and Phulchoki area close to the city of Lalitpur.

Also known locally as the (Nepali: काँडे भ्याकुर), Kande Bhyakur, literally translated "thorny bird". It was first scientifically described by Brian Houghton Hodgson in the mid-19th century, then never seen again and even feared extinct until famously rediscovered by Sidney Dillon Ripley, an American ornithologist, in the late 1940s.

It is predominantly a shy bird but can be seen in the early breeding season when the males sing out in the open. It lives in dense scrubs and mounts branches of bushes and small trees to sing.

It is threatened by the clearance of scrub for agriculture and expansion of urban areas.
