= Wildlife of Nepal =

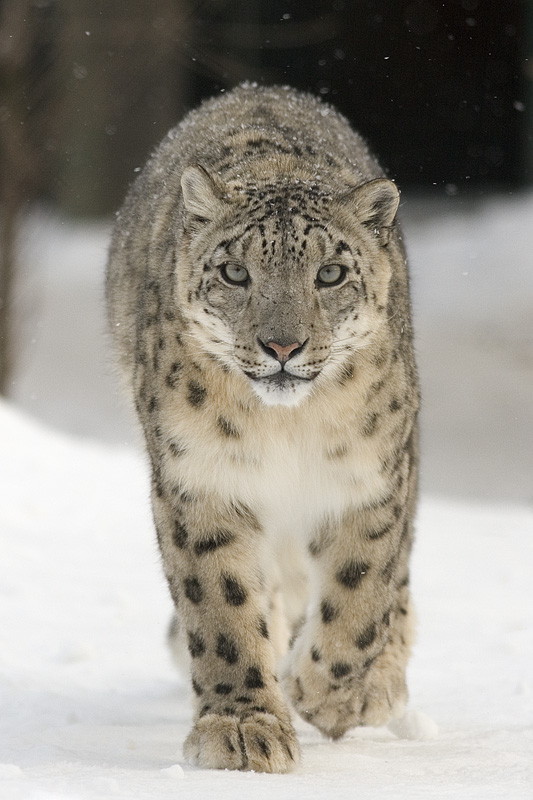
A Nepalese snow leopard

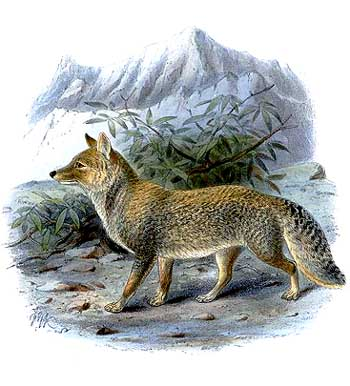
The Tibetan fox

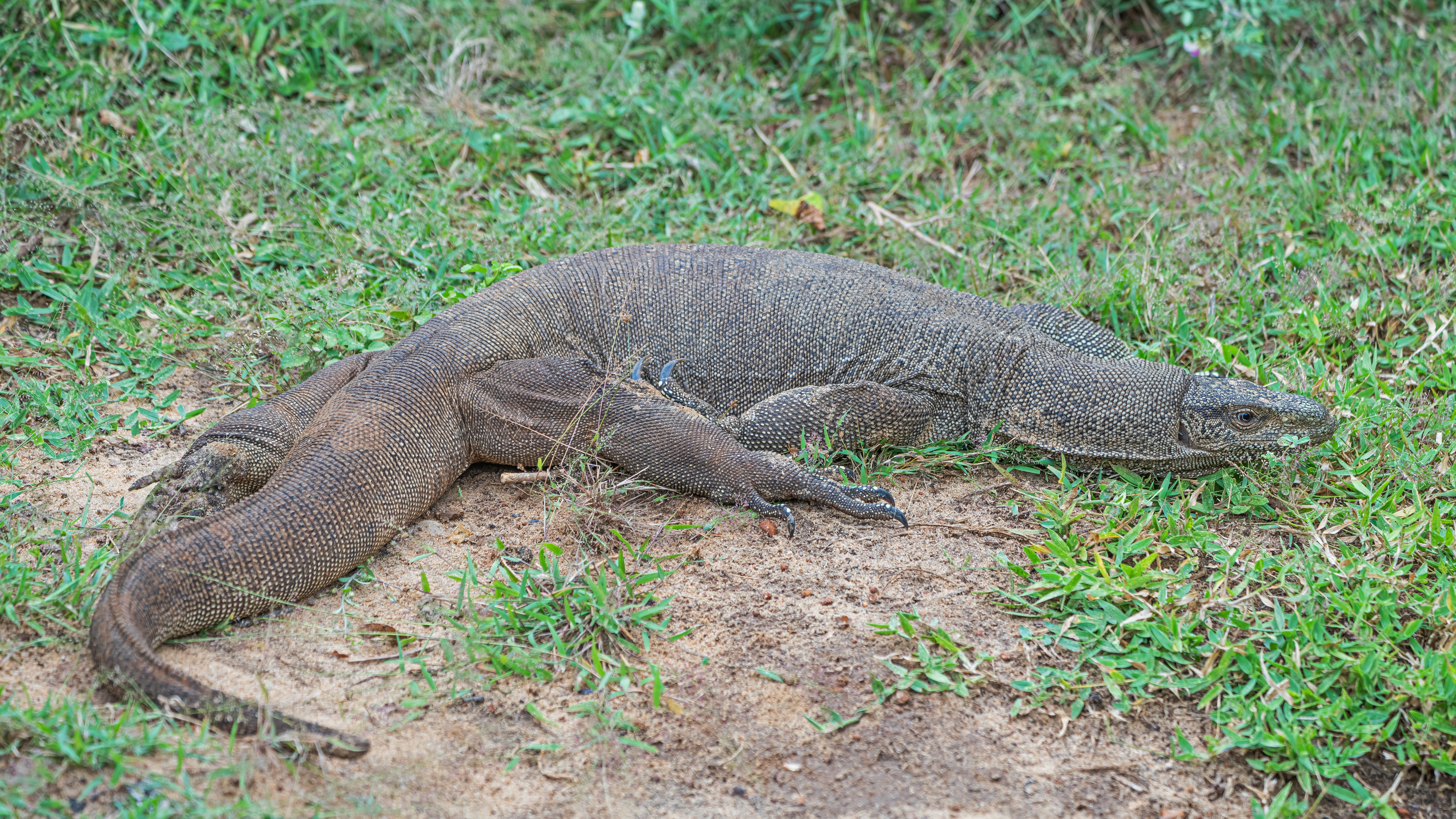
The Bengal monitor

Wildlife diversity is a notable feature of Nepal. Because of the variance in climate, from tropical to arctic, Nepal has a large variety of plants and animals. Wildlife tourism is a major source of tourism in the country. There are some animal species which are unique to Nepal, such as the spiny babbler. Nepal is also host to many rhododendron species. Nepal has numerous national parks and reserves to protect its diverse fauna. Nepal is a biodiversity hot spot with ecoregions broadly comprising the mountainous ecoregion, the savanna and grasslands ecoregion of the Terai , and the Rara Lake ecoregion.

== Legal protection ==
With the 1973 passing of the National Parks and Wildlife Conservation Act 2029 BS, Nepal has established numerous national parks and reserves in order to protect its fauna. There are four different classes of protection, ranging from national parks and nature reserves to wildlife and hunting reserves. By 1992 Nepal had established seven national parks, protecting in total over 893,200 hectares (3,449 mi^{2}) of land. Under these classes as of 2002 there were 23 protected areas: nine national parks, three wildlife reserves, three conservation areas, one hunting reserve, three additional Ramsar sites, and four additional World Heritage Sites. The most noted world heritage sites are Sagarmatha National Park and Chitwan National Park. In addition, the World Heritage Site in the Kathmandu Valley covers zones of significant biodiversity.

== Animals ==
=== Mammals ===
There are 208 mammal species reported including 28 species outside the limits of the protected areas but excluding four known extinct species. The smooth-coated otter and Eurasian otter are present in the country, and there are historical records of the Asian small-clawed otter. Among the mammal species in Nepal are the Bengal fox, Bengal tiger, clouded leopard, corsac fox, Indian rhinoceros, Asiatic elephant, marbled cat, Indian pangolin, Chinese pangolin, red panda, snow leopard, Tibetan fox and Tibetan wolf. The wild yak, thought to be regionally extinct in the 1970s, was rediscovered in 2014.

=== Reptiles ===
There are several types of reptile native to the country, ranging from pit vipers to monitor lizards. Some of the more prominent examples include the Bengal monitor, Gloydius himalayanus (a pit viper), the elongated tortoise (Indotestudo elongata), Trimeresurus septentrionalis, and the yellow monitor. Although the above are found elsewhere in southeast Asia, there are quite a few reptile species unique to the country, including Sitana fusca and Cyrtodactylus nepalensis. Sitana sivalensis, Japalura tricarinata, the Annapurna ground skink (Scincella capitanea), the lidless skink (Ablepharus nepalensis), geckos (Cyrtodactylus martinstolli), Shah's bamboo pit viper (Trimeresurus karanshahi) and the Tibetan pit viper (Gloydius strauchi) are also reptiles found in Nepal.

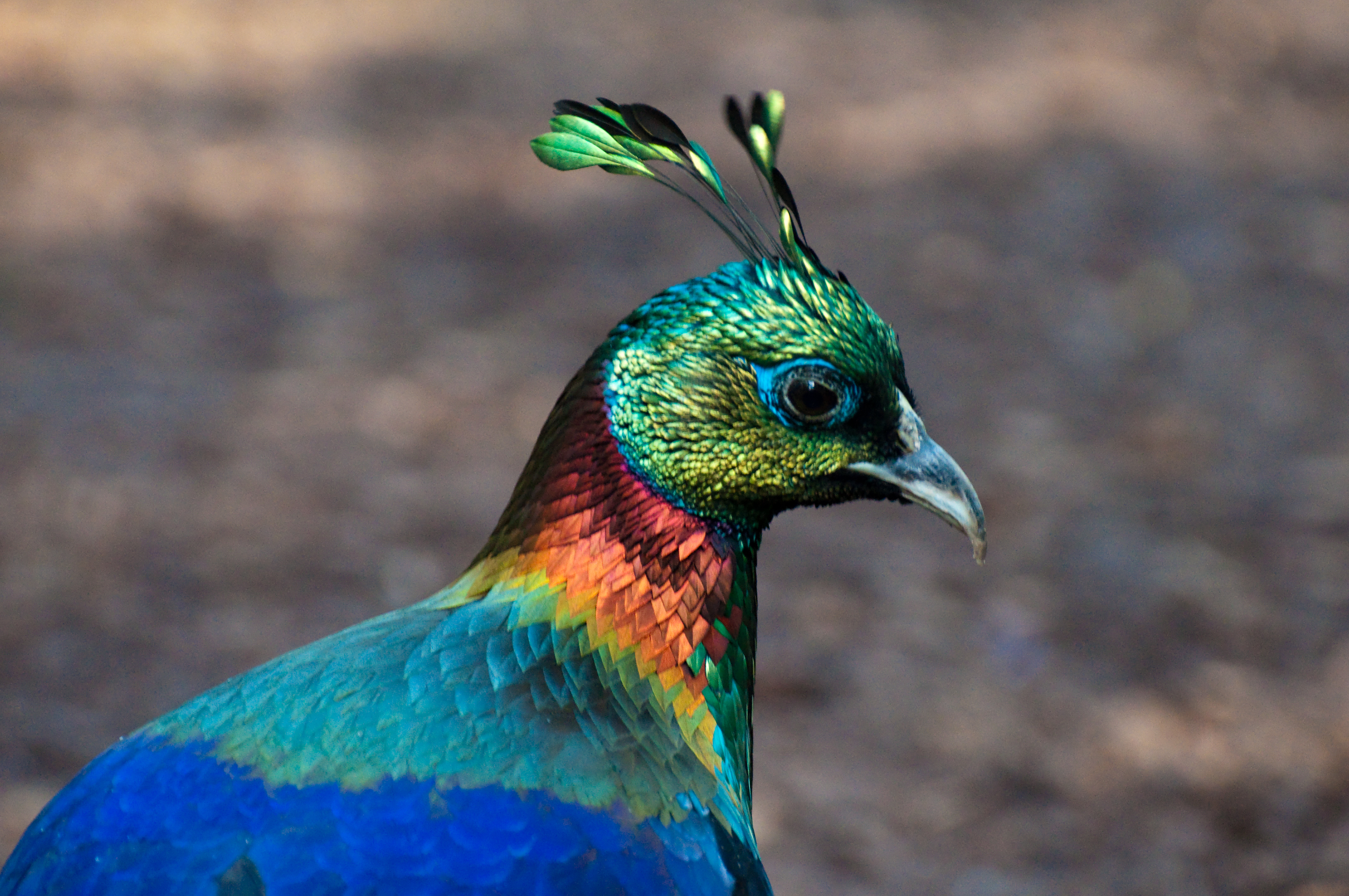
The danphe is the national bird of Nepal.

In 2019, the first successful gharial reproduction since 1982 was confirmed.

=== Avifauna ===
There are approximately 27 Important Bird Areas in the country and over 900 bird species (as of 2012) in Nepal of which 30 are globally threatened, 1 is endemic and 1 is introduced. The danphe, the national bird, is a type of pheasant. In addition, there are eight species of stork, five other species of pheasant, six minivets, seventeen cuckoos, thirty flycatchers, and sixty species of warblers. The spiny babbler is the only species endemic to Nepal.

=== Aquatic fauna ===
The aquatic faunal species reported from the water bodies in Nepal are: Pharping catfish (Myersglanis blythii), Psilorhynchus nepalensis, goonch catfish (Bagarius yarrelli), Nepalese minnow (Psilorhynchus pseudecheneis), Nepalese snowtrout (Schizothorax macrophthalmus), Turcinoemacheilus himalaya, erethistid catfishes (Erethistoides ascita and Erethistoides cavatura), bagrid catfish (Batasio macronotus) and sisorid catfishes (such as Pseudecheneis eddsi, Pseudecheneis crassicauda and Pseudecheneis serracula).

=== Invertebrates ===
Some of the important insect species reported are: ground beetles (Cychropsis nepalensis), Nebria molendai, dung beetles (Caccobius scheuerni), longhorned beetles (Hesperoclytus katarinae), moths (Heterolocha mariailgeae), katydids (Isopsera caligula), mole crickets (Gryllotalpa pygmaea), grasshoppers (Nepalocaryanda latifrons), bees (Andrena kathmanduensis), ant-mimicking thrips (Franklinothrips strasseni) and damselflies (Calicnemia nipalica). Other invertebrates reported are tarantulas (Haplocosmia nepalensis), goblin spiders (Brignolia ankhu), jumping spiders (Euophrys omnisuperstes), scorpions (Heterometrus nepalensis), centipedes (Cryptops nepalensis), land snails (Darwininitium shiwalikianum and Laevozebrinus nepalensis), and freshwater snails (Tricula mahadevensis).

== Flora ==
Emblem of Nepal with a wreath of red rhododendron enclosing the other symbols of the country

Research undertaken in the late 1970s and early 1980s documented 5,067 species of which 5041 were angiosperms and the remaining 26 species were gymnosperms. The Terai area has hardwood, bamboo, palm, and sal trees. Notable plants include the garden angelica, Luculia gratissima, Meconopsis villosa, and Persicaria affinis. However, according to ICOMOS checklist (as of 2006), in the protected sites, there are 2,532 species of vascular plants under 1,034 genera and 199 families. The variation in figures is attributed to inadequate floral coverage filed studies.

There are 400 species of vascular plants which are endemic to Nepal. Of these, two in particular are orchids Pleione coronaria and Oreorchis porphyranthes.

=== National flower ===
The most popular endemic plant of Nepal is rhododendron (arboreum) which in Nepali language is called guras. Lali guras (red rhododendron) is especially popular. It is grown extensively throughout Nepal, and particularly in the elevation range of 1,400–3,600 m. The flower is a national symbol and part of the cultural and religious ethos of the country. It symbolizes "national unity and people's sovereignty" and "reflects the spirit of Lok tantra (democracy) marked by inclusiveness and gender parity." The red rhododendron flowers forms the decorative ring in the form of wreath around the national emblem of Nepal which comprise the flag of Nepal, Mount Everest, green mountains, yellow colour representing the fertile Terai and with hands of male and female joined representing gender equality, and with an outline of the map of Nepal in the background. Below this emblem there is an inscription in Sanskrit which reads jananī janmabhūmiśca svargādapi garīyasī, which means "Mother and the motherland are greater than heaven." It is also used in traditional medicine to cure dysentery.

== Protected species of fauna ==
There are 38 protected wildlife species of fauna including birds of which 50% are in various stages of threat. These are the following:

- Vulnerable: blackbuck, gaur, Tibetan wolf, clouded leopard, Gangetic dolphin, Python molurus
- Endangered: wild yak, wild water buffalo, hispid hare, swamp deer, Eurasian lynx, Bengal tiger, snow leopard, Bengal florican, gharial, Himalayan musk deer, cheer pheasant
