= List of Odonata species of Nepal =

The following is a list of Odonata of Nepal. One hundred and eighty-five species from seventeen families are listed.

This list is primarily based on Graham Vick's 1989 list with some recent additions and a modernized classification.

== Suborder Anisozygoptera ==
=== Family Epiophlebiidae ===
- Epiophlebia laidlawi - Himalayan relict dragonfly

== Suborder Zygoptera – damselflies ==
=== Family Amphipterygidae – diplebiidae ===
- Philoganga montana

=== Family Calopterygidae – jewelwings ===
- Neurobasis chinensis chinensis - stream glory
- Caliphaea confusa
- Vestalis gracilis gracilis - clear-winged forest glory

=== Family Chlorocyphidae ===
- Aristocypha cuneata syn A. bifenestrata
- Aristocypha quadrimaculata
- Aristocypha trifasciata syn A. bifasciata
- Aristo (Para) cypha unimaculata
- Libellago lineata lineata - river heliodor
- Heliocypha biforata

=== Family Euphaeidae ===
- Allophaea (Euphaea) ochracea
- Anisopleura comes
- Anisopleura lestoides
- Anisopleura subplatystyla
- Bayadera indica
- Bayadera longicauda
- Bayadera hyaline

=== Family Synlestidae ===
- Megalestes major - giant green spreadwing
- Megalestes irma

=== Family Lestidae ===
- Indolestes cyaneus
- Lestes dorothea
- Lestes praemorsus praemorsus - sapphire-eyed spreadwing

=== Family Coenagrionidae ===
- Aciagrion hisopa
- Aciagrion olympicum
- Aciagrion pallidum - pale slender dartlet
- Aciagrion occidentale - green-striped slender dartlet
- Aciagrion approximans - Indian violet dartlet
- Agriocnemis clauseni
- Agriocnemis lacteola - milky dartlet
- Agriocnemis pygmaea - pygmy dartlet
- Agriocnemis femina - pinhead dartlet
- Enallagma parvum - azure dartlet
- Paracercion calamorum - dusky lilysquatter
- Paracercion malayanum - Malay lillysquatter
- Ceriagrion azureum - azure marsh dart
- Ceriagrion cerinorubellum - orange-tailed marsh dart
- Ceriagrion fallax fallax - black-tailed marsh dart
- Ceriagrion fallax cerinomelas
- Ceriagrion coromandelianum - Coromandel marsh dart
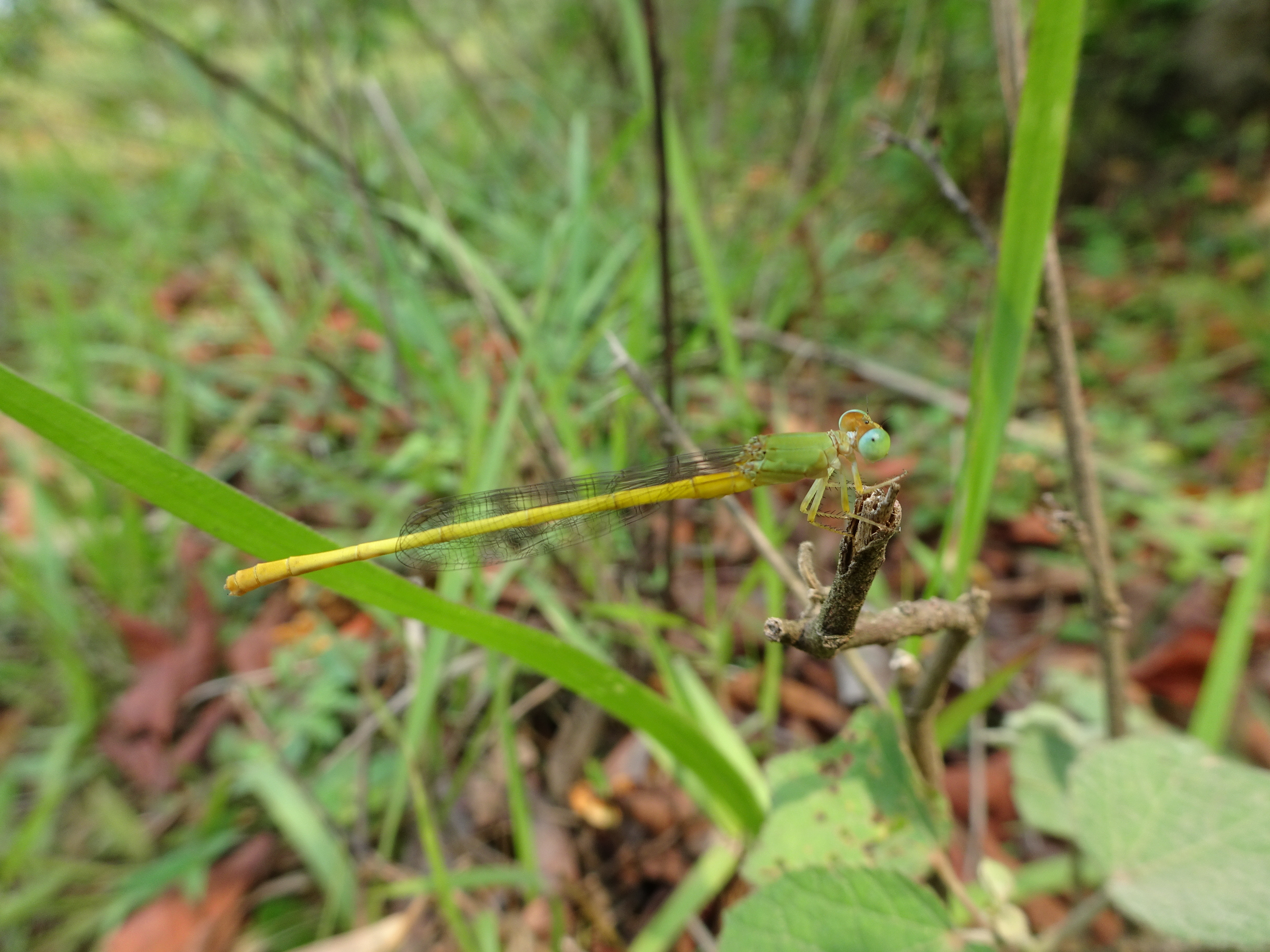
  Ceriagrion coromandelianum (Coromandel marsh dart)
- Ceriagrion olivaceum - rusty marsh dart
- Coenagrion exclamationis
- Ischnura rubilio - western golden dartlet
- Ischnura montana
- Ischnura elegans - common bluetail
- Ischnura forcipata - forcipate dartlet
- Ischnura rufostigma - ruby dartlet
- Ischnura nursei - pixie dartlet
- Onychargia atrocyana - black marsh dart
- Pseudagrion australasiae
- Pseudagrion decorum - three-lined dart
- Pseudagrion microcephalum - blue grass dart
- Pseudagrion rubriceps - saffron-faced blue dart
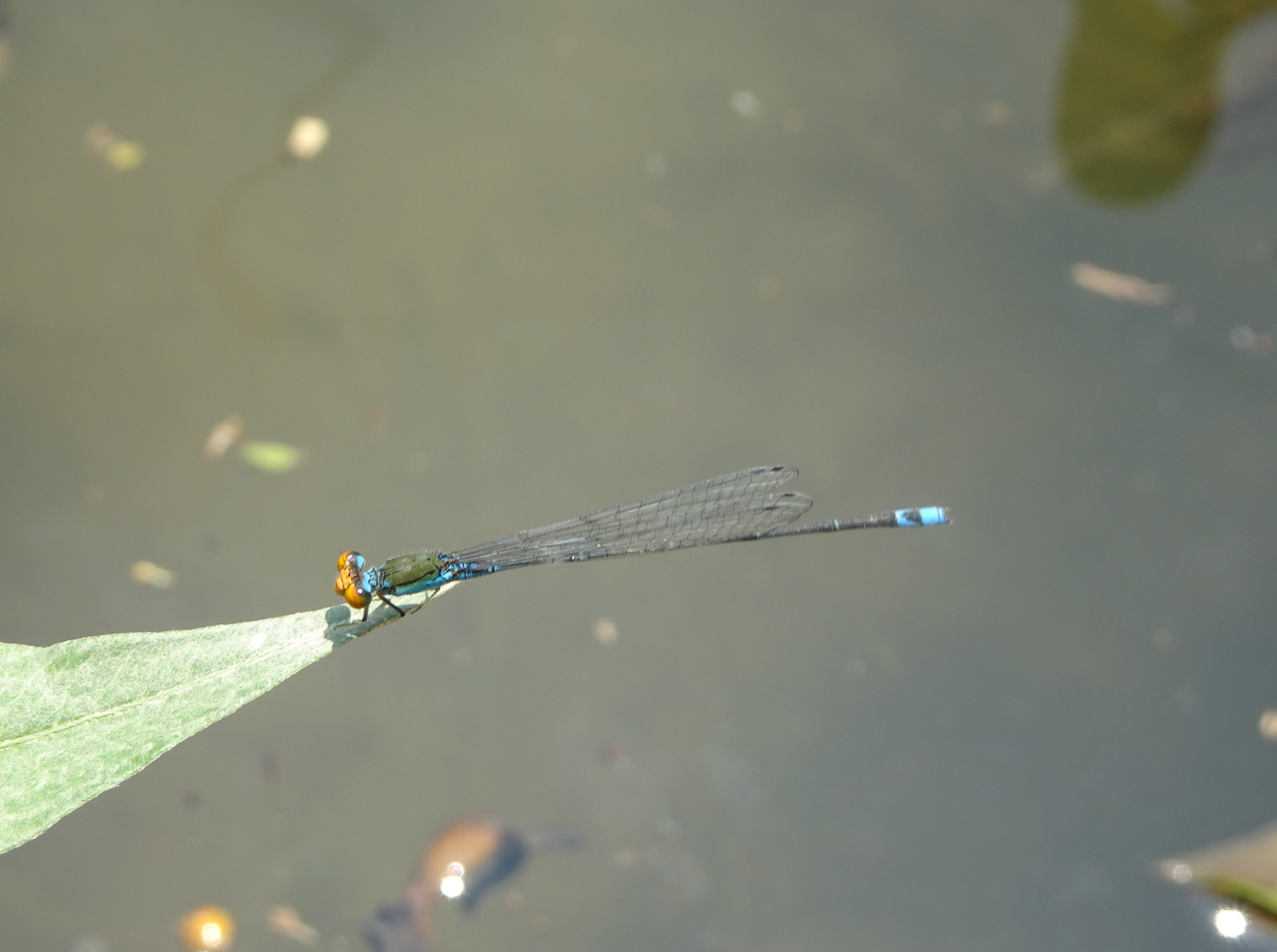
  Pseudagrion rubriceps (saffron-faced blue dart) from Phewa Lake, Lakeside, Pokhara
- Pseudagrion spencei

=== Family Platycnemididae – featherlegs ===
- Coeliccia renifera
- Calicnemia doonensis carmine
- Calicnemia eximia
- Calicnemia miniata
- Calicnemia mortoni
- Calicnemia nipalica

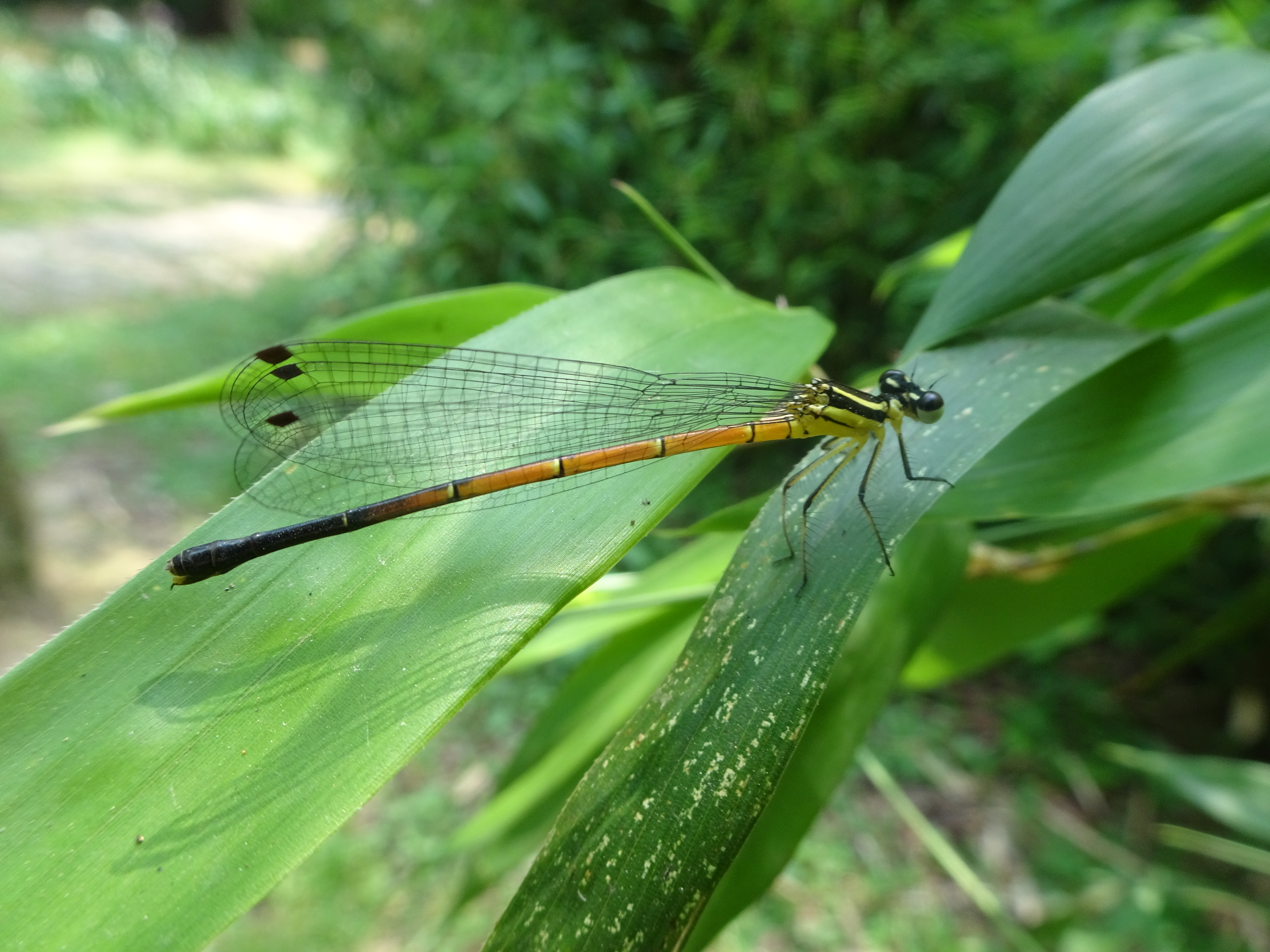
Calicnemia nipalica

- Calicnemia pulverulans
- Copera vittata - blue bush dart
- Copera marginipes - yellow bush dart

=== Family Platystictidae – forest damsels ===
- Drepanosticta carmichaeli - Indo-Chinese blue reedtail

=== Family Protoneuridae ===
- Prodasineura autumnalis - black threadtail
- Prodasineura odoneli

== Suborder Anisoptera – dragonflies ==
=== Family Gomphidae ===
- Anisogomphus bivittatus
- Anisogomphus occipitalis - Shivalik clubtail
- Anisogomphus orites
- Burmagomphus hasimaricus
- Burmagomphus sivalikensis
- Davidius aberrans aberrans
- Davidius delineates
- Ictinogomphus angulosus
- Ictinogomphus kishori
- Ictinogomphus pertinax
- Ictinogomphus rapax - Indian common clubtail
- Macrogomphus montanus
- Macrogomphus seductus
- Microgomphus phewataali
- Nepogomphus modestus
- Lamelligomphus biforceps
- Scalmogomphus bistrigatus
- Onychogomphus cerastes
- Nychogomphus duaricus
- Onychogomphus risi
- Onychogomphus schmidti
- Onychogomphus saundersii
- Paragomphus lindgreni
- Paragomphus lineatus
- Perissogomphus stevensi
- Platygomphus dolabratus
- Stylogomphus inglisi

=== Family Aeshnidae ===
- Aeshna petalura petalura
- Anaciaeschna jaspidea - rusty darner
- Anaciaeschna martini
- Anaciaeschna donaldi
- Anax guttatus - blue-tailed green darner
- Anax indicus - lesser green emperor
- Anax nigrofasciatus nigrolineatus
- Anax immaculafrons
- Anax parthenope
- Cephalaeschna acutifrons
- Cephalaeschna klapperichi
- Cephalaeschna masoni
- Cephalaeschna orbifrons
- Cephalaeschna viridifrons
- Gynacantha bayadera - parakeet darner
- Gynacantha incisura
- Gynacantha khasiaca
- Gynacanthaeschna sikkima
- Oligoaeschna martini
- Periaeschna unifasciata
- Polycanthagyna erythromelas

=== Family Cordulegastridae ===
- Anotogaster basalis palampurensis
- Anotogaster gregoryi
- Anotogaster nipalensis
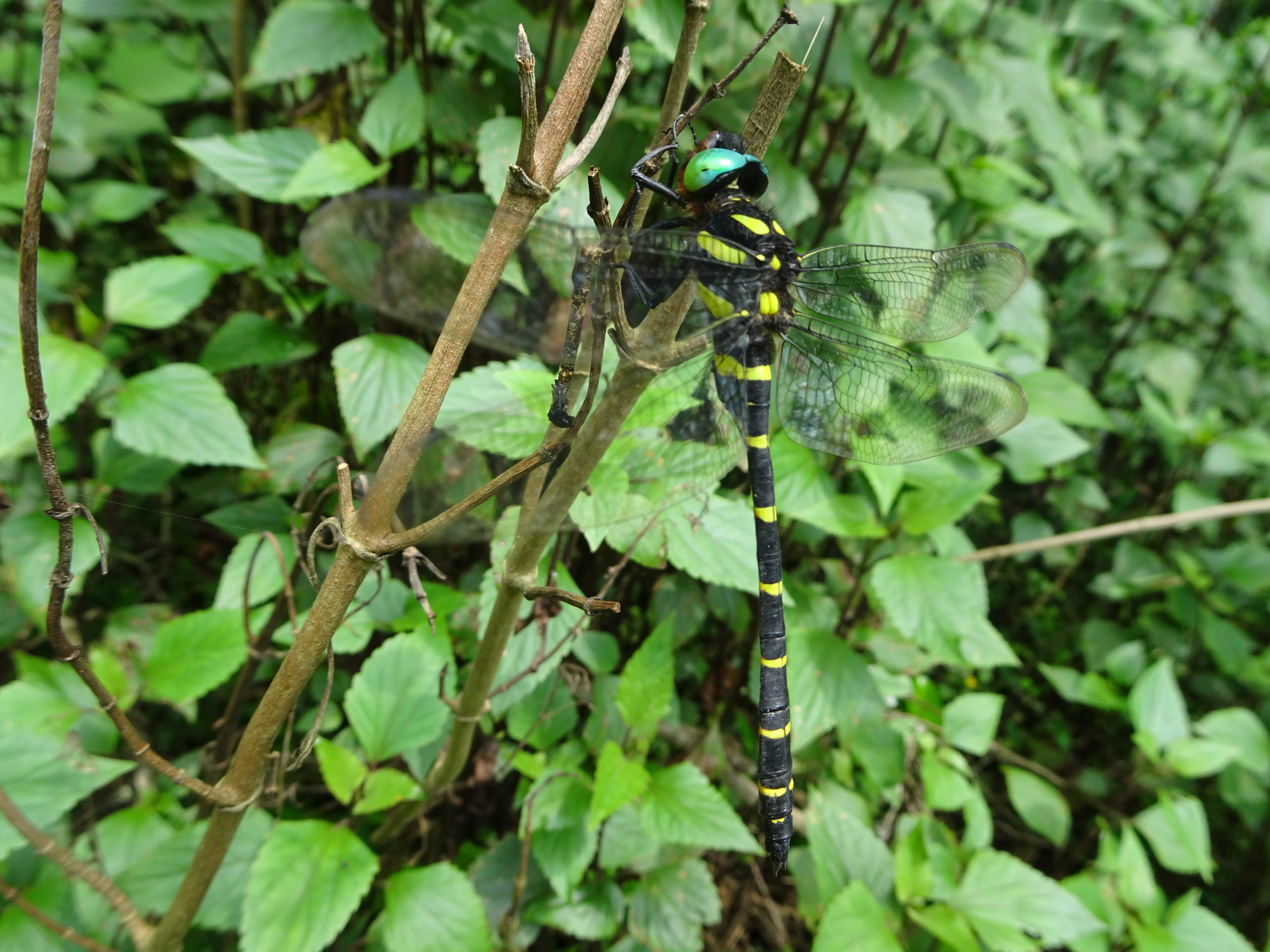
  Anotogaster nipalensis
- Chlorogomphus atkinsoni
- Chlorogomphus mortoni
- Chlorogomphus olympicus
- Chlorogomphus preciosus
- Chlorogomphus selysi
- Cordulegaster brevistigma brevistigma
- Neallogaster hermionae
- Neallogaster latifrons
- Neallogaster ornata

=== Family Corduliidae ===
- Epophthalmia frontalis frontalis
- Idionyx stevensi

=== Family Macromiidae ===
- Macromia cingulata
- Macromia flavocolorata
- Macromia moorei moorei
- Macromia sombui
- Somatochlora nipalensis

=== Family Libellulidae ===
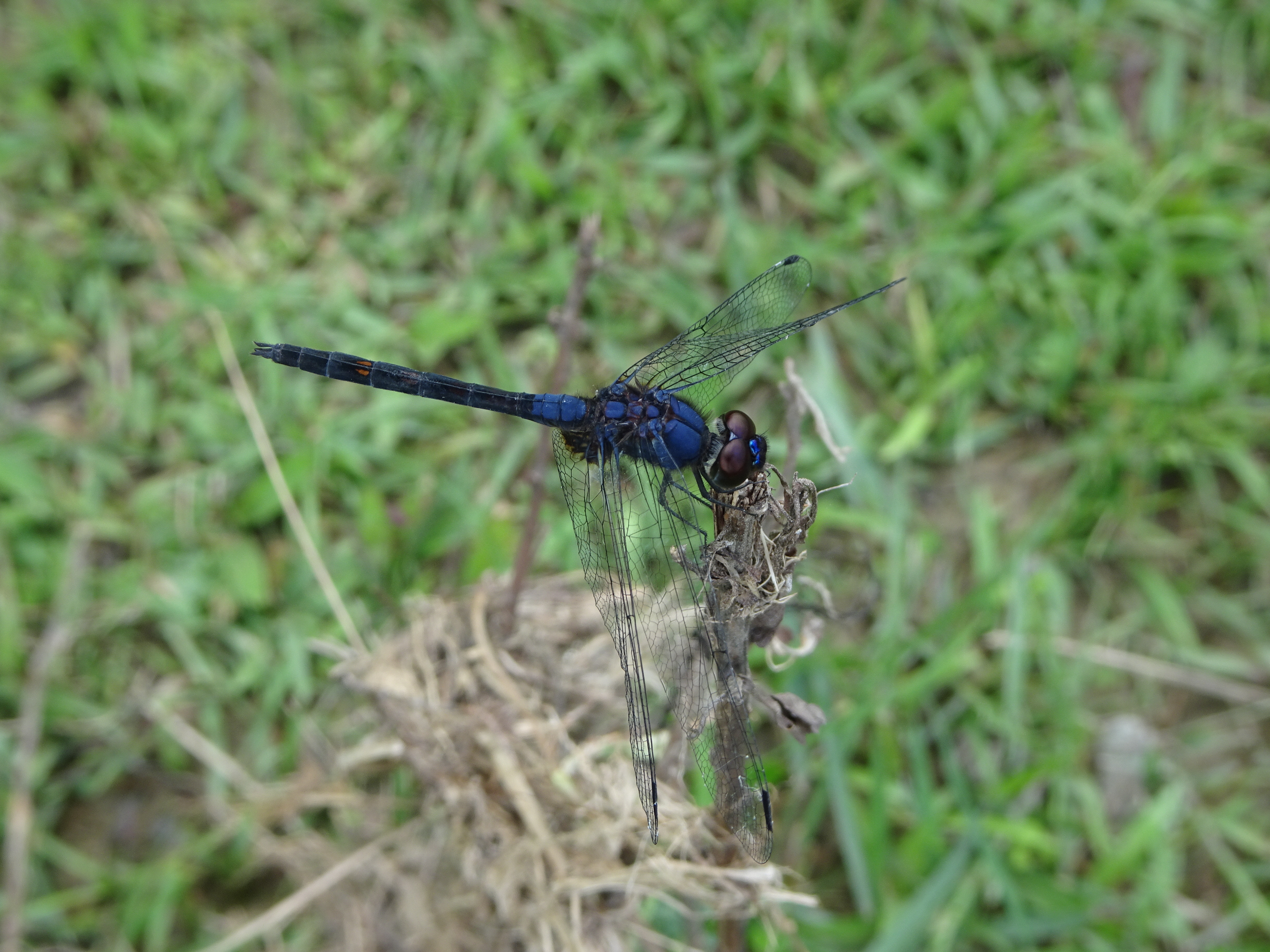
Trithemis festiva (black stream glider)

- Acisoma panorpoides panorpoides - trumpet-tail
- Aethriamanta brevipennis - scarlet marsh hawk
- Brachythemis contaminata - ditch jewel
- Brachydiplax sobrina - little blue marsh hawk
- Barchydiplax chalybea - rufous-backed marsh hawk
- Bradinophyga geminata - granite ghost
- Cratilla lineata - emerald-banded skimmer
- Cratilla metallica
- Crocothemis erythaea - broad skimmer
- Crocothemis servilia - scarlet skimmer
- Diplacodes lefebvreii
- Diplacodes nebulosa - black-tipped ground skimmer
- Diplacodes trivialis - blue ground skimmer
- Libellula quadrimaculata
- Lyriothemis bivittata
- Nannophya pygmaea
- Neurothemis fulvia - fulvous forest skimmer
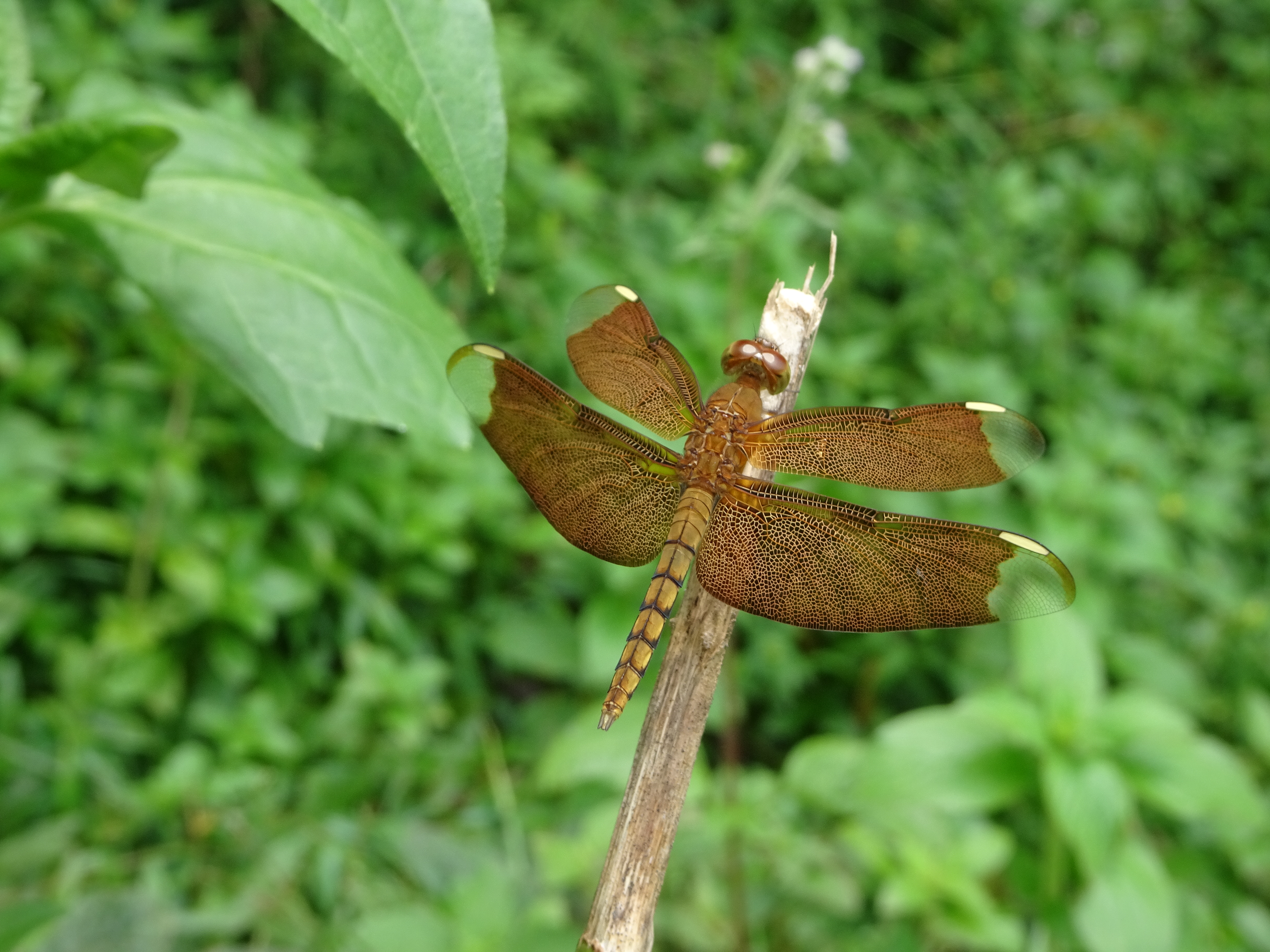
  Female Neurothemis fulvia (fulvous forest skimmer)
- Neurothemis intermedia - paddyfield parasol
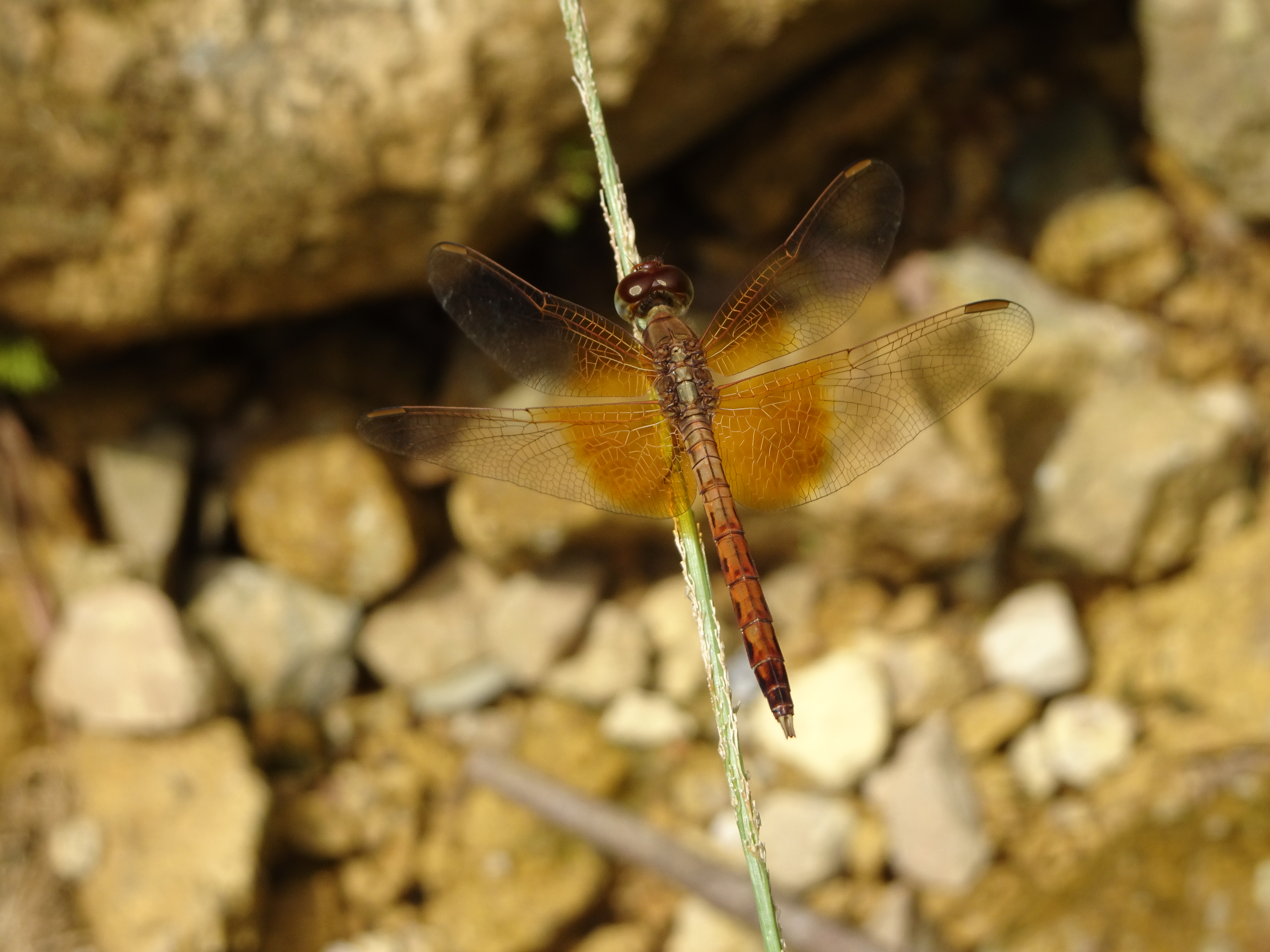
  Neurothemis intermedia (paddyfield parasol)
- Neurothemis tullia tullia - pied paddy skimmer
- Orthetrum glaucum- blue marsh hawk
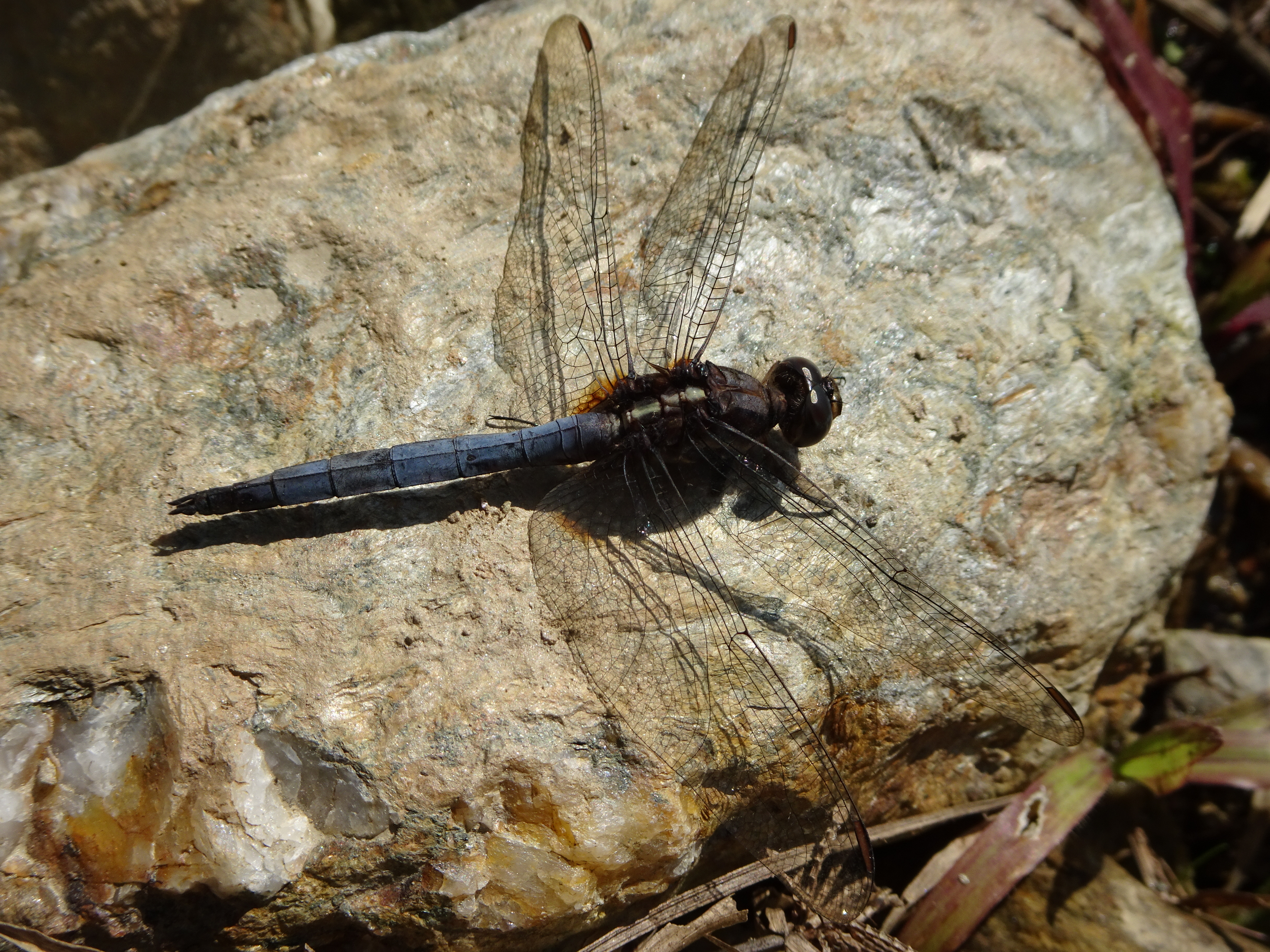
  Male Orthetrum glaucum (blue marsh hawk)
- Orthetrum japonicum internum
- Orthetrum luzonicum - tri-coloured marsh hawk
- Orthetrum pruinosum neglectum - crimson-tailed marsh hawk
- Orthetrum coerulescens anceps - keeled skimmer
- Orthetrum sabina - green marsh hawk
- Orthetrum taeniolatum - small skimmer
- Orthetrum triangulare triangulare - blue-tailed forest hawk
- Orthetrum lineostigma
- Onychothemis testaceum testaceum
- Palpopleura sexmaculata sexmaculata - blue-tailed yellow skimmer
- Pantala flavescens - wandering glider
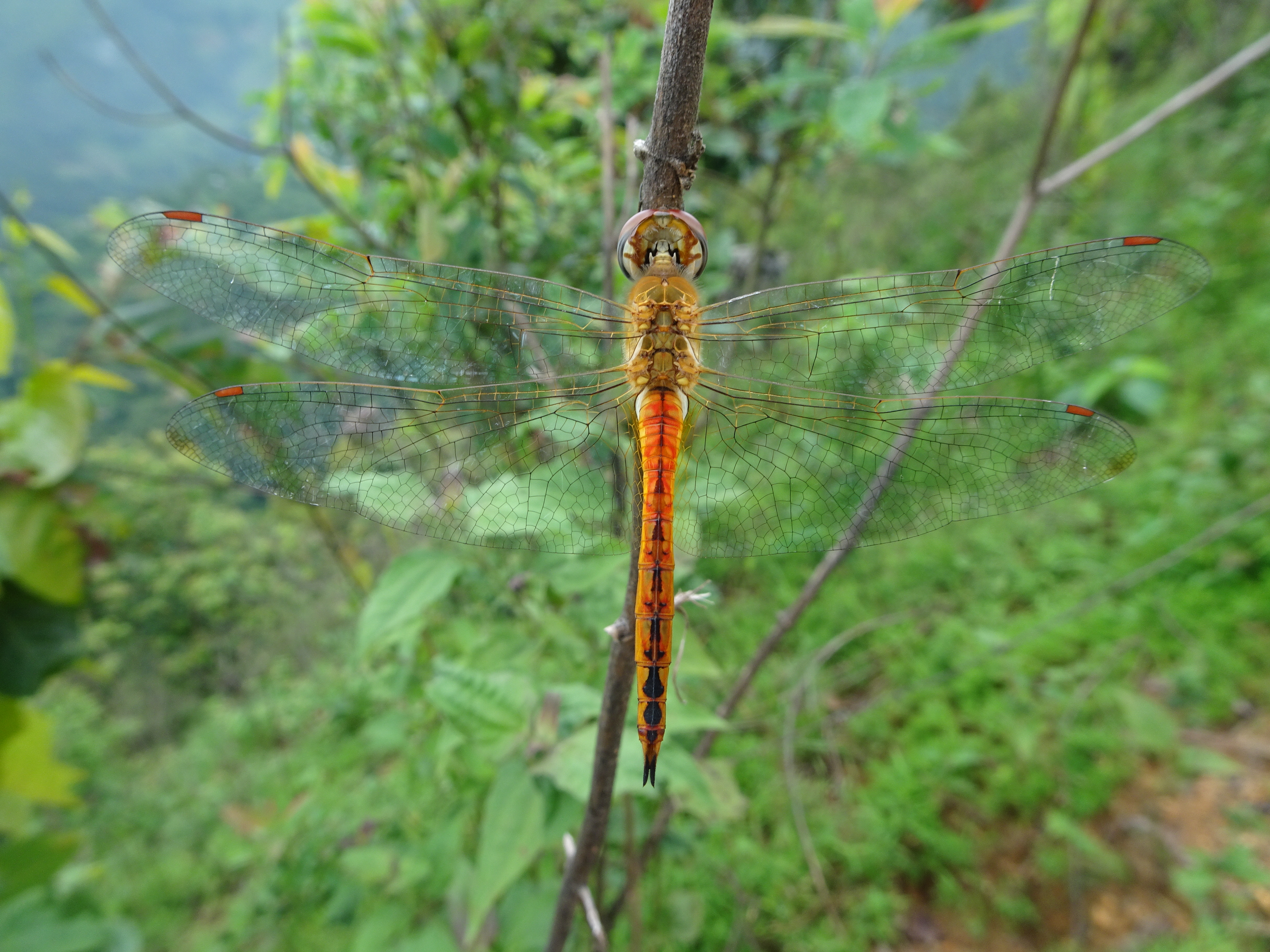
  Pantala flavescens (wandering glider)
- Potamarcha congenera - yellow-tailed ashy skimmer
- Pseudotramea prateri
- Rhodothemis rufa - rufous marsh glider
- Rhyothemis plutonia - greater blue-wing
- Rhyothemis triangularis - lesser blue-wing
- Rhyothemis variegata variegata - common picturewing
- Selysiothemis nigra
- Sympetrum commixtum
- Sympetrum decoloratum
- Sympetrum fonscolombei
- Sympetrum haematoneura
- Sympetrum hypomelas
- Sympetrum orientale
- Tholymis tillarga
- Tramea basilaris burmeisteri - red marsh trotter
- Tramea limbata simiata - black marsh trotter
- Tramea virginia
- Trithemis aurora - crimson marsh glider
- Trithemis festiva - black stream glider
- Trithemis pallidinervis - long-legged marsh glider
- Urothemis signata signata - greater crimson glider
- Zygonyx iris - emerald cascader

== See also ==
- List of butterflies of Nepal
- Cerambycidae of Nepal
- Zygaenidae of Nepal
- Wildlife of Nepal
