= Titanic (disambiguation) =

Titanic was an ocean liner that struck an iceberg and sank in the North Atlantic Ocean in 1912.

Titanic may also refer to:

== Arts, entertainment, and media ==
=== Films ===
- Titanic (1915 film), a silent Italian film unrelated to the RMS Titanic disaster
- Titanic (1943 film), a German film by Werner Klingler
- Titanic (1953 film), a film by Jean Negulesco
- S.O.S. Titanic, a 1979 British-American film by William Hale
- Titanic (1997 film), an American film by James Cameron
- Titanic (2026 film), a 2026 Indian film unrelated to the RMS Titanic disaster
- Titanic: The Legend Goes On, a 2000 Italian animated film
- Titanic II (film), a 2010 film
- Titanic 666, a 2022 horror film

=== Games ===
- Hidden Expedition: Titanic (2010), an app developed by Big Fish Games
- Starship Titanic (1998), a computer game designed by Douglas Adams and produced by The Digital Village
- Titanic: Adventure Out of Time, a 1996 computer game developed by Cyberflix
- Titanic: Honor and Glory (TBA), developed by Vintage Digital Revival
- Titanic: The Board Game (1998), a board game designed by Sandra Gentry and Valen Brost and published by Universal Games

=== Literature ===
- Titanic, a 1912 book by Filson Young
- The Titanic: (An Ode of Immortality), a 1912 book by Ronald Campbell Macfie
- Titanic, 15. April 1912, a 1913 book by Irene von Schellander
- Titanic: Eine Ozean-Phantasie, a 1928 book by Marie Eugenie delle Grazie
- Titanic and Other Ships, a 1935 autobiography by Charles Lightoller
- Titanic (German: Der Titanensturz), a 1937 novel by Robert Friedlaender-Prechtl
- Titanic: The Long Night, a 1998 novel by Diane Hoh

=== Music ===
==== Albums ====
- Titanic (Nautilus Pompilius album), a 1994 album by Nautilus Pompilius
- Titanic (Mark Seymour album), a 2007 album by Mark Seymour
- Titanic, a 1982 album by Francesco De Gregori
- RMS Titanic, a 2016 soundtrack album by Adam Young of Owl City
- Titanic: Music from the Motion Picture, a soundtrack album from the 1997 film

==== Songs ====
- "Titanic" (Falco song), a song by Falco from Nachtflug
- "Titanic", a song by Frederik
- "Titanic", a song by Goodnight Mr. Mackenzie from their album Five
- "Titanic", a song by Juice WRLD from his album Legends Never Die
- "Titanic", a song by No Knife from their album Drunk on the Moon
- "Titanic", a song by Robin Schulz from his album Sugar
- "The Titanic" (song), an American folk song
- "Titanic", a song by Earl Sweatshirt from his album SICK!
- "Titanic", a track from the soundtrack of the 2014 Indian film Jigarthanda
- "The Titanic", a song by Moving Hearts from their album The Storm

==== Other uses in music ====
- Titanic (Norwegian band), a Norwegian rock band
- Titanic (American band)
- "Titanic", a method used in change ringing; when on 11 bells called "Titanic cinques" (pronounced "sinks")
- Titanic Records, an American record label

=== Television ===
- Titanic (1996 miniseries), an American-Canadian television miniseries
- Titanic (2012 TV series), a British-Canadian-Hungarian television drama
- Titanic: Blood and Steel (2012), a 12-part television costume drama series about the construction of the RMS Titanic

=== Other uses in arts, entertainment, and media ===
- Titanic (magazine), a German satirical magazine
- Titanic (musical), a 1997 Broadway musical
- Titanic (play), a 1974 play by Christopher Durang
- Titanic, a fictitious luxury space liner on "Voyage of the Damned", a 2007 episode of Doctor Who

== Brands and enterprises ==
- RMS Titanic Inc., company with salvor-in-possession rights to the wreck which displays the salvaged wreck pieces around the world
- Titanic Brewery, a UK producer of beer in Burslem, near Stoke-on-Trent

== People ==
- Titanic Sinclair (born 1987), stage name of musician Corry Michael Mixter
- Titanic Thompson (1892–1974), American gambler, golfer, and hustler
- Jinx Titanic (born 1968), American singer-songwriter
- Morris Titanic (born 1953), retired NHL ice hockey player with the Buffalo Sabres
- "Titanic", nickname of Salman Raduyev, Chechen warlord

== Places ==
- Titanic, Oklahoma, United States
- Titanic, Saskatchewan, Canada
- Titanic Quarter, Belfast, Northern Ireland

== Ships ==
- SS Titanic (1888), built by M'Ilwaine, Lewis & Co. for H. J. Scott & Co; see List of ship launches in 1888
- MY Titanic, named after the RMS Titanic
- Replica Titanic, the concept of creating a modern replica of the RMS Titanic
  - Titanic II, a proposed replica of the original Titanic
  - Romandisea Titanic, a replica under construction in Sichuan, China

== Other uses ==
- Titanic acid, a chemical compound

== See also ==
- Halomonas titanicae, the Titanic rusticle bacteria
- Itanic, a derisive nickname for the Intel Itanium processor
- Sinking of the Titanic (disambiguation)
- Titan (disambiguation)
- Titan submersible implosion
- Titania (disambiguation)
- Titanium (disambiguation)
