= Titanica (disambiguation) =

Titanica may refer to:

- Titanica (film), a 1992 IMAX documentary film about the RMS Titanic
- Encyclopedia Titanica, an online reference work about the RMS Titanic
- Titanica, a fictional band in Mr. Show
- Titanica, a fictional city in the 1960s TV show Stingray
- Titanica, a fictional character from the animated TV show Yu-Gi-Oh! Zexal II
- Arctesthes titanica (A. titanica), a moth species
- Dysdera titanica (D. titanica), a spider species
- Eublemma titanica (E. titanica), a moth species
- Holcocera titanica (H. titanica), a moth species
- Kenrickodes titanica (K. titanica), a moth species
- Lepanthes titanica (L. titanica), a species of orchid; see List of Lepanthes species
- Paralebeda femorata titanica (P. f. titanica), a subspecies of moth
- Ringicula titanica (R. titanica), a species of sea snail
- Stelis titanica (S. titanica), a species of orchid; see List of Stelis species

== See also ==
- Halomonas titanicae (H. titanicae), the Titanic rusticle bacteria
- Titanic (disambiguation)
- Titania (disambiguation)
- Titan (disambiguation)
