= Titan =

Titan most often refers to:

- Titan (moon), the largest moon of Saturn
- Titans, a generation of deities in Greek mythology

Titan or Titans may also refer to:

== Arts and entertainment ==
=== Fictional entities ===
==== Fictional locations ====
- Titan in fiction, fictionalized depictions of the moon of Saturn
- Titan (Marvel Comics location), a moon
  - Titan (Marvel Cinematic Universe), its Marvel Cinematic Universe counterpart
- Titan, a moon in the list of locations of the DC Universe
- Titan, a Fighting Fantasy gamebooks world

==== Fictional characters ====
- Titan (Dark Horse Comics), a superhero
- Titan (Imperial Guard), a Marvel Comics superhero
- Titan (New Gods), from DC Comics' Darkseid's Elite
- Titan, in the Infershia Pantheon
- Titan, in Megamind
- Titan, in Sym-Bionic Titan
- King Titan, on Stingray (1964 TV series)
- Titan, in Invincible (comics)

==== Fictional species and groups ====
- Titan (Dune)
- Titan (Dungeons & Dragons)
- Titans (Attack on Titan)
- Teen Titans, a DC superhero team
- Titan Legions, units in the tabletop game Epic
- Titans, in All Tomorrows
- Titans, in Brütal Legend
- Titans, in Deltarune
- Titans, in Destiny (video game)
- Titans, in the Monsterverse franchise, introduced in Godzilla: King of the Monsters
- Titans, in the Marvel Universe, the fictional race of supervillain Thanos
- Titans, in Mobile Suit Zeta Gundam
- Titans, in Skibidi Toilet
- Titans, in The Owl House
- Titans, in Titanfall

==== Other fictional entities ====
- Titan, a chemical in Batman: Arkham Asylum
- Titan, a class of ship in Eve Online
- Titan (Battlefield 2142), a type of ship in Battlefield 2142 and a game mode based on them
- Titan, a ship in the 1898 novel The Wreck of the Titan: Or, Futility noted for similarities to the Titanic
- Titan Off-Planet Construction, in the video games DOOM (2016) and DOOM Eternal

=== Film and television ===
- The Titan (film), a 2018 science fiction film directed by Lennart Ruff
- The Titan: Story of Michelangelo, a 1950 German documentary film
- Titan A.E., a 2000 animated film
- Titans (film), a Malayalam-language film
- Titans (2000 TV series), a 2000 American soap opera
- Titans (2018 TV series), a 2018 live-action superhero series
- Titans (Canadian TV series), a 1981–1982 docudrama series

=== Games ===
- Titan (1988 video game), a puzzle game by Titus
- Titan (cancelled video game), a cancelled massively multiplayer game planned by Blizzard Entertainment
- Titan, the original name of a cancelled massively multiplayer game based on Halo; see Unreleased Halo games § Halo MMO
- Titan (board game)
- Titan (eSports), an electronic sports team
- Age of Mythology: The Titans, an expansion pack for the Age of Mythology computer game
- Planetary Annihilation: Titans, an expansion pack RTS for Planetary Annihilation

=== Literature ===
- Titan (Baxter novel), a 1997 science fiction novel by Stephen Baxter
- Titan (Bova novel), by Ben Bova in the Grand Tour series
- Titan (Jean Paul novel), a novel by the German writer Jean Paul
- Titan (John Varley novel), a 1979 novel in the Gaea Trilogy
- Titan (Fighting Fantasy book), a 1986 fantasy encyclopedia edited by Marc Gascoigne
- Titan: The Life of John D. Rockefeller, Sr., a 1998 non-fiction book by Ron Chernow
- Star Trek: Titan, a novel series
- The Game-Players of Titan, a 1963 science fiction novel by Philip K. Dick
- The Sirens of Titan, a 1959 science fiction novel by Kurt Vonnegut Jr.
- The Titan (collection), a collection of short stories by P. Schuyler Miller
- The Titan (novel), 1914, by Theodore Dreiser
- The Titans (comic book) (1999–2003), published by DC Comics, featuring the Teen Titans superhero team
- The Titans (novel), in the Kent Family Chronicles series by John Jakes
- Titan (novel), a 2026 novel by Rob Grant and Andrew Marshall

=== Music ===
- Titán (band), a Mexican band
- Tytan (band), a British rock band
- Titan (album), 2014, by Septicflesh
- Symphony No. 1 (Mahler), given the working title Titan
- "Titan" (song), 2023, by Besa Kokëdhima
- "Titan", by Bright from The Albatross Guest House
- "Titan", by HammerFall from Threshold
- The Titan (EP), by Oh, Sleeper
- "The Titan", by In Vain from The Latter Rain
- "The Titan", by Iron Savior from Firestar
- "Titans", by Major Lazer featuring Sia and Labyrinth from Music Is the Weapon (Reloaded)
- "Titans", a 2015 song by Aero Chord and Razihel

=== Roller coasters ===
- Titan (Six Flags Over Texas), a steel hyper coaster at Six Flags Over Texas, Arlington, Texas, US
- Titan (Space World), a steel roller coaster at Space World, Kitakyushu, Japan

== Brands and enterprises ==
=== Entertainment and media companies ===
- Titan (transit advertising company), an American advertising company
- Titan Corporation, a US–based information technology company
- Titan Entertainment Group, a British media company that includes Titan Books and Titan Comics
- Titan Media, a pornographic film company
- Titan Studios, a video game company
- Titan Productions, defunct film dubbing studio originally known as Titra Studios
- Titan Content

=== Manufacturers ===
- Titan Aircraft, an aircraft kit manufacturer
- Titan Cement, a Greek building materials company
- Titan Chemical Corp, a Malaysian chemical company
- Titan Company, an Indian watchmaking and luxury goods company
- Titan Formula Cars, a race car manufacturer from 1967 to 1976
- Titan Tire Corporation

=== Other brands and enterprises ===
- Titan (ice hockey), a hockey equipment brand by The Hockey Company
- Titan, a line of locks by Kwikset
- Titan Airways, an airline
- Titan Advisors, an American asset management firm
- TITAN Salvage, a marine salvage and wreck removal company

== People ==
- Titán (wrestler) (born 1990), Mexican masked wrestler
- Paula Titan (born 1990), Brazilian politician
- Oliver Kahn (born 1969), German footballer known as Der Titan
- Titan Leeds (1699–1738), American almanac publisher

== Places ==
- Titan (cave), Derbyshire, England
- Titan, Saghar District, Afghanistan
- Titan, Bucharest, a neighborhood of Bucharest, Romania
  - Titan metro station
- Titan, Russia, a rural locality in Murmansk Oblast, Russia
- Titan Tower (Fisher Towers), a natural tower in Utah, US
- Titan Stadium (disambiguation), name of a number of stadiums

== Science and technology ==
=== Computing ===
==== Smartphones ====
- HTC Titan (Windows Mobile phone), running the Windows Mobile operating system
- HTC Titan, running the Windows Phone operating system
- HTC TyTN
- Moto G (2nd generation), a Motorola smartphone with the codename Titan running the Android operating system

==== Other uses in computing ====
- Titan (1963 computer), a 1960s British computer
- Titan (email), an email service
- Titan (microprocessor), a scrapped family of 32-bit PowerPC–based microprocessor cores
- Titan (supercomputer), an American supercomputer
- Titan, a Facebook messaging platform
- GTX Titan, a GPU by NVIDIA
- TITAN2D, a geoflow simulation software application
- Titan (security token), a security chip and key from Google

=== Cranes ===
- Herman the German (crane vessel), former nickname for the floating crane Titan in the Panama Canal Zone
- Titan (crane), an Australian floating crane
- Titan crane, a type of block setting crane
  - Titan Clydebank, a cantilever crane in Scotland

=== Natural sciences ===
- Titan (moon), the largest moon of Saturn
- "-titan", a commonly used taxonomic suffix to describe large animals
- Titan beetle
- Titan test, an intelligence test

=== Other technologies ===
- Tactical Intelligence Targeting Access Node (TITAN), a US Army program

== Sports ==
=== Sports teams ===
==== American football ====
- Tennessee Titans
- Titans of New York

==== Basketball ====
- Dresden Titans, Germany
- Titanes de Barranquilla, Colombia
- Victoria Titans, Australia

==== Rugby ====
- Gold Coast Titans, an Australian rugby league team
- Taunton Titans, first XV team of Taunton Rugby Football Club
- Titans RLFC, a Welsh rugby league team
- Ulster Titans, a Northern Irish rugby team

==== Other sports ====
- Acadie–Bathurst Titan, a 1998–2025 Canadian ice hockey team
- Kotka Titans, a Finnish ice hockey team
- New York Titans (lacrosse), a 2006–2009 American lacrosse team
- Orlando Titans, a 2010 American lacrosse team
- Titanes F.C., a Venezuelan football team
- Titans (cricket team), a South African cricket team

=== Championships ===
- Titan Cup, a triangular cricket series between India, South Africa and Australia in 1996

== Vehicles ==
=== Air- and spacecraft ===
- Titan (rocket family)
  - Titan I
  - Titan II
- Airfer Titan, a Spanish paramotor design
- Cessna 404 Titan, a light aircraft
- Ellipse Titan, a hang glider
- Titan Tornado, a family of cantilever high-wing, pusher configuration, tricycle gear-equipped kit aircraft manufactured by Titan Aircraft

=== Land vehicles ===
- Titan Armoured Vehicle Launching Bridge, an Armoured Bridge Launcher used by the British Army
- Apple electric car project, codenamed Titan
- Chevrolet Titan, a cabover truck made 1968–1988
- Leyland Titan (B15), a bus made 1977–1984
- Leyland Titan (front-engined double-decker), a bus chassis made 1927–1969
- Mazda Titan, a cabover truck sold in Japan
- Nissan Titan, a pickup truck sold 2004–2024
- Terex 33-19 "Titan", a haul truck
- Volkswagen Titan, a truck in the Volkswagen Constellation line sold in Brazil

=== Maritime vessels ===
- Titan (steam tug 1894), a Dutch steam tug
- Titan (submersible), imploded during a descent to observe the wreck of RMS Titanic in 2023
  - Titan submersible implosion
- Titan (yacht), a 2010 Abeking & Rasmussen built yacht
- Titan (crane), an Australian floating crane
- Empire Titan, a tugboat
- USNS Titan (T-AGOS-15), a 1988 U.S. Navy ship
- Titan, a floating crane in the Panama Canal Zone long known as Herman the German

=== Rail ===
- Titan, a South Devon Railway Gorgon class locomotive

== Other uses ==
- Titans, a generation of deities in Greek mythology
- Titan test, an intelligence test
- Titan (dog), the world's tallest dog
- Titan (prison), a proposed new classification of prison in England and Wales
- Titan, a Bank of England £100,000,000 note of the pound sterling
- Titan language, a language of Manus Island, Papua New Guinea
- Titan the Robot, a costume
- HMH-769, a helicopter squadron, nicknamed Titan
- Grand Titan, a high-ranking title in the white supremacist Ku Klux Klan

== See also ==
- The Titan Games, an American television series
- Game Titan, a former American Video Game development studio
- Remember the Titans, a 2000 American sports drama film
- Project Titan (disambiguation)
- Teen Titans (disambiguation)
- Titanic (disambiguation)
- Titanium (disambiguation)
- Titian (disambiguation)
- Titin, a protein
