= Titanic of The Skies =

Titanic of the Skies may refer to:

- Hindenburg:Titanic of the Skies (film), a 2007 documentary film about the 6 May 1937 crash of the Hindenburg dirigeable at Lakehurst, NJ, USA
  - Hindenburg disaster (6 May 1937) at Lakehurst, NJ, USA
    - LZ 129 Hindenburg, a German Zeppelin airship destroyed on 6 May 1937, crashing at Lakehurst, NJ, USA
- TITANIC of the Skies! — The Untold Story of Air France 447 (film), a documentary film about the 1 June 2009 mid-Atlantic inter-tropical-zone crash of Air France Flight 447

== See also ==
- "Titanic in the Sky" (episode), a 2014 documentary TV episode of Mayday! Air Disaster about the 4 November 2010 flight of an Airbus A380 operating as Qantas Flight 32; see List of Mayday episodes
  - Qantas Flight 32
- Sinking of the Titanic
- Titanic (disambiguation)
