= Tytan =

Tytan may refer to:

- Tytan (band), a British rock band of the early 1980s
- Tytan Teepprasan (born 1999), Thai singer, songwriter, and actor
- FC Tytan Donetsk, the Tytan soccer team from Donetsk, Ukraine
- FC Tytan Armyansk, the Tytan soccer team from Armyansk, Ukraine
- Projekt TYTAN, a Polish military future soldier system project
- TyTAN, a support program for the Eurofighter Typhoon

== See also ==
- HTC TyTN, a smartphone
- Titan (disambiguation)
