= List of shipwrecks in July 1890 =

The list of shipwrecks in July 1890 includes ships sunk, foundered, grounded, or otherwise lost during July 1890.

== 1 July ==
List of shipwrecks: 1 July 1890
Ship	State	Description
Tacito	Austria-Hungary	The brigantine was driven ashore and wrecked near Oulu, Grand Duchy of Finland. She was on a voyage from Cette, Hérault, France to Oulu.

== 2 July ==
List of shipwrecks: 2 July 1890
Ship	State	Description
D. J. Foley	United States	The steamship was destroyed by fire on Lake Ontario.
Galveston	United Kingdom	The steamship ran aground in the Saint Lawrence River at Contrecoeur, Quebec, Dominion of Canada. She was refloated and taken in to Montreal, Quebec on 4 July.
James Martin	United Kingdom	The barque was driven ashore at Valparaíso, Chile. She was on a voyage from Newcastle, New South Wales to Vaparaíso. She was a total loss.
Unnamed	United Kingdom	The steamship ran aground at Oran, Algeria.

== 3 July ==
List of shipwrecks: 3 July 1890
Ship	State	Description
Flying Childers	United Kingdom	The paddle tug was run into by the steamship Baria (Germany) in the River Wear at Sunderland, County Durham and was beached.
Regius	United Kingdom	The steamship collided with another ship and sank in the Hooghly River. She was on a voyage from Calcutta, India to London
Sir Galahad	United Kingdom	The steamship ran aground near Huelva, Spain. She was refloated and taken in to Huelva.

== 4 July ==
List of shipwrecks: 4 July 1890
Ship	State	Description
Alexander Lawrence	United Kingdom	The barque arrived at Mauritius on fire. The fire was extinguished. She was on a voyage from Calcutta, India to Boulogne, Pas-de-Calais, France.
Ann Widnall	United Kingdom	The schooner collided with the tug Hercules (United Kingdom) and sank in the River Mersey. Her crew were rescued by Hercules. Ann Widnall was on a voyage from Annalong, County Down to Garston, Lancashire.
Cambridge	United Kingdom	The steamship ran aground and was wrecked at Aveiro, Portugal. Her crew were rescued. She was on a voyage from Cardiff, Glamorgan to Gibraltar.
Santa Rosa	Italy	The barque ran aground at Santa Rosa, Argentina.
Nova Sympathia	Brazil	The barque was driven ashore and wrecked on the Valdés Peninsula, Argentina. She was on a voyage from Rio de Janeiro to Paranaguá.

== 5 July ==
List of shipwrecks: 5 July 1890
Ship	State	Description
Berar	United Kingdom	The barque was driven ashore at Ostend, West Flanders, Belgium. She was refloated on 31 July and taken in to Ostend.
Henry	United Kingdom	The Mersey flat was wrecked on the North Bank, in Liverpool Bay.
NMS Joultache, and Vulcan	Royal Romanian Navy; Germany	The gunboat Joultache and the steamship Vulcan collided at Galaţi. Both vessels were damaged.
Newcombe	United Kingdom	The barque was driven ashore at Ostend. Her crew were rescued.
Unnamed	United Kingdom	The hulk was torpedoed off the Isle of Wight in a demonstration of a Brennan torpedo.
Unnamed	Victoria	The lighter sank at Melbourne.

== 6 July ==
List of shipwrecks: 6 July 1890
Ship	State	Description
Americus	United States	The brig was driven ashore and wrecked on Sandy Island, Anguilla. She was on a voyage from New York to Antigua.
Lily	United Kingdom	The steam launch sank a Spithead, Hampshire.
Vooruyt	Netherlands	The schooner was driven ashore on Ameland, Friesland. Her crew were rescued. She was on a voyage from Gothenburg, Sweden to Groningen. She was a total loss..

== 7 July ==
List of shipwrecks: 7 July 1890
Ship	State	Description
George D. Fullerton	United Kingdom	The schooner sprang a leak and foundered 10 nautical miles (19 km) west south west of the Smalls Lighthouse. Her crew took to a boat; they were rescued by the steamship Milford. George D. Fullerton was on a voyage from Newport, Monmouthshire to Cork.
Pauline	Netherlands	The barque sprang a leak and was beached 40 nautical miles (74 km) west of Cape Fear, North Carolina, United States. Her crew were rescued. She was on a voyage from Apalachicola, Florida, United States to Delfzijl, Groningen. She subsequently became a wreck.
Saratoga	United States	The school ship ran aground on the Duke Rock. She was refloated and taken in to Plymouth Sound.

== 8 July ==
List of shipwrecks: 8 July 1890
Ship	State	Description
Eureka	United Kingdom	The Thames barge was abandoned off Eastbourne, Sussex. All four people on board were rescued by the Eastbourne Lifeboat William and Mary (Royal National Lifeboat Institution). Eureka was on a voyage from London to Poole, Dorset. She came ashore 2 nautical miles (3.7 km) east of Eastbourne. She was refloated the next day with the assistance of a tug and towed in to Newhaven, Sussex.
Fram	Norway	The steamship ran aground on the Middelgrunden. She was on a voyage from Ipswich, Suffolk, United Kingdom to Libau, Russia. She was refloated with assistance and resumed her voyage.
Hibernian	United Kingdom	The steamship collided with an iceberg. She was on a voyage from the Clyde to Philadelphia, Pennsylvania, United States. She completed her voyage.
Mirella	United Kingdom	The schooner collided with the paddle steamer Rouen (United Kingdom) at Newhaven and sank. All seven people on board were rescued. Mirella was on a voyage from Havre de Grâce, Seine-Inférieure, France to Newhaven. She was refloated on 10 July.
Penny	United Kingdom	The sloop was driven ashore at Penarth Head, Glamorgan. Her crew were rescued.

== 9 July ==
List of shipwrecks: 9 July 1890
Ship	State	Description
Edith	United Kingdom	The Thames barge struck the wreck of the Thames barge Ontario in the River Thames at Silvertown, London and was damaged. She was beached.
Ontario	United Kingdom	The Thames barge capsized and sank in the River Thames at Silvertown. Her crew were rescued.

== 11 July ==
List of shipwrecks: 11 July 1890
Ship	State	Description
Tioga	United States	The steam barge exploded and sank partially submerged in 14 feet (4.3 m) of water in the Chicago River at the foot of Washington Street, Chicago, Illinois after a crewman with a lantern accidentally ignited fumes from her cargo of naptha and benzine. She was raised the next day, but suffered another explosion of her cargo and sank again. Raised later, repairs completed and returned to service in September. At least 25 killed; three or four crew , the rest were stevedores unloading the cargo.

== 12 July ==
List of shipwrecks: 12 July 1890
Ship	State	Description
Broomhaugh	United Kingdom	The ship was driven ashore at Bandar Lingah, Iran. She was refloated on 14 July.
County of Salop	United Kingdom	The steamship was driven ashore at "Rashdib", Egypt. She was on a voyage from South Shields, County Durham to Madras, India. She was refloated on 19 July.
Henri IV	France	The steamship was driven ashore and wrecked near Le Croisic, Loire-Inférieure. She was on a voyage from Havre le Grâce, Seine-Inférieure to Nantes, Loire-Inférieure and Halifax, Nova Scotia, Dominion of Canada.

== 13 July ==
List of shipwrecks: 13 July 1890
Ship	State	Description
Louisa	Sweden	The sloop sprang a leak and was beached at Oskarshamn.
Minerva	United Kingdom	The steamship was wrecked at "Messida", near "La Galle", Algeria with the loss of nine of her 22 crew. She was on a voyage from Messida to Swansea, Glamorgan.
Sea Wing	United States	The steamship capsized in a storm in the Mississippi River, Lake Pepin. Ninety-eight people died including the captain's wife and son. She was refloated, rebuilt and returned to service.
Unnamed	Flag unknown	The steamship was driven ashore at the Ashraffi Lighthouse, Egypt.

== 14 July ==
List of shipwrecks: 14 July 1890
Ship	State	Description
Bernadotte	Norway	The barque was driven ashore and wrecked at Onega, Russia. She was on a voyage from London, United Kingdom to Onega.
Royal Shepherd	United Kingdom	The steamship collided with the steamship Hesketh (United Kingdom) and sank off the Sydney Heads, New South Wales. She was on a voyage from Melbourne to Woolongong, New South Wales.

== 15 July ==
List of shipwrecks: 15 July 1890
Ship	State	Description
Ino	Norway	The barque was abandoned in the Atlantic Ocean. Her crew were rescued. She was on a voyage from Liverpool, Lancashire, United Kingdom to Rio de Janeiro, Brazil.
Royal Norman	United Kingdom	The paddle trawler struck the anchor of HMS Clyde (Royal Navy) and sank at Aberdeen.

== 16 July ==
List of shipwrecks: 16 July 1890
Ship	State	Description
Zodiac	United Kingdom	The barque was abandoned off Camden Head, New South Wales. Her crew were rescued by the steamship Konoowarra (United Kingdom). Zodiac was on a voyage from Kaipara Harbour, New Zealand to Sydney, New South Wales.

== 17 July ==
List of shipwrecks: 17 July 1890
Ship	State	Description
Anlandhu	United Kingdom	The steamship ran aground in the River Mersey. She was on a voyage from Riga, Russia to Liverpool, Lancashire. She was refloated with assistance from the tug Agincourt (United Kingdom) and completed her voyage.
Elderslie	United Kingdom	The steamship caught fire 40 nautical miles (74 km) off Albany, Western Australia. She was on a voyage from Fremantle to Albany.
Gil	Portugal	The barque was driven ashore and wrecked 5 leagues (15 nautical miles (28 km)) north of Maceió, Brazil. She was on a voyage from Rio de Janeiro to Pernambuco, Brazil.
Lois	United Kingdom	The barque was driven ashore and wrecked in Roebuck Bay, Western Australia.
Matthew Owen	United Kingdom	The schooner sprang a leak and sank in the Irish Sea 5 nautical miles (9.3 km) north west of Skerries, County Dublin. Her crew were rescued. She was on a voyage from Liverpool to Roscarberry, County Cork.
Panay	United States	The full-rigged ship was driven ashore and wrecked on Simara Island, Spanish East Indies. She was on a voyage from Manila to Yloilo.
Unnamed	United Kingdom	The steam barge sank at Limerick. Her four crew survived.

== 18 July ==
List of shipwrecks: 18 July 1890
Ship	State	Description
City of Detroit, and Kasota	United States	The steamships collided in the Detroit River. Kasota sank; City of Detroit put in to Chicago, Illinois in a severely damaged condition.
Egypt	United Kingdom	The steamship was destroyed by fire in the Atlantic Ocean 1,100 nautical miles (2,000 km) off Land's End, Cornwall. She was on a voyage from New York, United States to Liverpool, Lancashire.
Industry	United Kingdom	The fishing lugger was driven ashore at Dymchurch, Kent. Her four crew were rescued by rocket apparatus.
Jenny	Norway	The brig ran aground at Shoreham-by-Sea, Sussex, United Kingdom. She was on a voyage from Sandarne, Sweden to Shoreham-by-Sea.

== 19 July ==
List of shipwrecks: 19 July 1890
Ship	State	Description
Fitzclarence	United Kingdom	The steamship was severely damaged by fire at Ratcliffe, London.
Grace Butler	United Kingdom	The brig capsized, was driven ashore and wrecked on the south west point of Puerto Rico. All on board were rescued. She was on a voyage from Halifax, Nova Scotia, Dominion of Canada to Puerto Rico.
Gulf of St. Vincent	United Kingdom	The steamship struck a sunken rock or wreck off the West Mouse, off the coast of Anglesey. Her passengers were taken off by the Holyhead Lifeboat Thomas Fielder ( Royal National Lifeboat Institution), which subsequently also rescued her captain a pilot. Gulf of St. Vincent was on a voyage from Liverpool, Lancashire to Valparaíso, Chile. She subsequently broke in two with the loss of a crew member.
Hilding	Sweden	The steamship collided with another ship and sank at Ottendorf, Germany. She was on a voyage from Halmstad to Hamburg, Germany.
Ianthe	United Kingdom	The barque was wrecked 15 nautical miles (28 km) north of Port Nolloth, Cape Colony with the loss of two or three of her crew. She was on a voyage from Port Nolloth to Swansea, Glamorgan.
Jubilee	United Kingdom	The smack caught fire at Stornoway, Isle of Lewis and was scuttled.
Kirkstall	United Kingdom	The steamship ran aground in the River Blaivet, Morbihan, France and was severely damaged. She was on a voyage from the River Tees to Hennebon Morbihan.
Marie	France	The barque was wrecked on the Molasses Reef, in the Caicos Islands. She was on a voyage from Monte Christi, Dominican Republic to Falmouth, Cornwall, United Kingdom.
Muncaster	United Kingdom	The steamship ran aground at Garston, Lancashire. She was on a voyage from Huelva, Spain to Liverpool, Lancashire. She was later refloated with assistance and completed her voyage.
Ogmore	United Kingdom	The steamship ran aground at Widnes, Cheshire. She was refloated.
Rockhurst	United Kingdom	The ship was driven ashore at Goeree, Zeeland, Netherlands. She was on a voyage from Pascagoula, Mississippi to Dordrecht, South Holland, Netherlands. She was refloated in late July.
Silding	Sweden	The steamship collided with the steamship Persian Prince (United Kingdom) and sank with the loss of two of her crew. Silding was on a voyage from Halmstadt to Hamburg, Germany.
S. W. Kelly	United Kingdom	The steamship was driven ashore at Rosendaël, Nord, France. She was on a voyage from Bilbao, Spain to Dunkerque, Nord. She was later refloated with the assistance of a number of tugs and taken in to Dunkerque.

== 20 July ==
List of shipwrecks: 20 July 1890
Ship	State	Description
Ohurg, or Shwig	Ottoman Empire	The steamship ran aground and sank off Jeddah, Hejaz Vilayet. All on board survived.
Ribble	United Kingdom	The steamship collided with the steamship Pedro (Spain) in the River Mersey and was severely damaged. Ribble was on a voyage from Liverpool, Lancashire to Harrington, Cumberland. She put back to Liverpool.
Tam o'Shanter	United Kingdom	The full-rigged ship ran aground in the River Liffey. She was on a voyage from San Francisco, California, United States to Dublin.
Thorn Holme	United Kingdom	The steamship was driven ashore in the Saint Lawrence River at Rivière-du-Loup, Quebec, Dominion of Canada. She was on a voyage from Pictou, Nova Scotia to Montreal, Quebec. She was refloated on 29 July, and take in to Quebec City in a leaky condition.
Truth	Norway	The barque collided with the steamship Altmore (United Kingdom) and sank in the Grand Banks of Newfoundland. Her crew were rescued. Truth was on a voyage from Christiania to New York, United States.
Washington	France	The steamship became waterlogged at Saint-Nazaire due to a valve being left open.

== 21 July ==
List of shipwrecks: 21 July 1890
Ship	State	Description
George W. Elder	United States	The steamship was driven ashore 2 nautical miles (3.7 km) west of Point Wilson, Washington. She was later refloated and taken in to Victoria, British Columbia, Dominion of Canada.
Hirondelle	France	The schooner was wrecked in the Faroe Islands. Her nine crew survived.
Naiaden	United Kingdom	The barque ran aground on the Maplin Sands, in the North Sea off the coast of Essex.

== 22 July ==
List of shipwrecks: 22 July 1890
Ship	State	Description
Mary Jameson	United Kingdom	The brig was driven ashore and wrecked at Opobo, Oil Rivers Protectorate. Her crew were rescued. She was on a voyage from Rotterdam, South Holland, Netherlands to the west coast of Africa, or from the Opobo River to Rotterdam.
Milo	United Kingdom	The steamship ran aground at West Hartlepool, County Durham. She was on a voyage from West Hartlepool to Wismar, Germany.
M. H. Clift	United States	The steamship was destroyed by fire in the Tennessee River.
Musgrave	United Kingdom	The steamship was driven ashore at Gammon Head, Devon. She was refloated and resumed her voyage.
Verge	Norway	The brigantine ran aground on the Scroby Sands, in the North Sea off the coast of Norfolk, United Kingdom. She was refloated and resumed her voyage.
Unnamed	Flag unknown	The steamship ran aground on the Gunfleet Sand, in the North Sea off the coast of Suffolk, United Kingdom.

== 23 July ==
List of shipwrecks: 23 July 1890
Ship	State	Description
Changsha	United Kingdom	The steamship was driven ashore on Rattray Island, Queensland.
Emma	United Kingdom	The ketch struck the Cairnbulg Reef, in the North Sea off the coast of Aberdeenshire. She consequently foundered off Rattray Head. Her two crew took to a boat; they were rescued by Margaret and Elizabeth (United Kingdom). Emma was on a voyage from Cullen, Banffshire to the Firth of Forth.
Egypt	United Kingdom	The steamship caught fire at sea. Her crew were rescued by the steamship Manhattan (United Kingdom. Egypt was on a voyage from New York to Liverpool, Lancashire.
Idaho	United Kingdom	The steamship ran aground 3.5 nautical miles (6.5 km) off South Point, Anticosti Island, Quebec, Dominion of Canada and was wrecked. She was on a voyage from Montreal, Quebec to Bristol, Gloucestershire.
Lewisman	United Kingdom	The fishing boat was driven ashore near Stornoway, Isle of Lewis.
Mary Ellen	Dominion of Canada	The schooner was wrecked on a reef at Sand Point, District of Alaska. She later was sold, refloated, and sold again.
Maud Hawthorn	United Kingdom	The paddle steamer Arran collided with the schooner Matilda (United Kingdom) in the River Thames. She then collided with the Thames barge Maud Hawthorn, which sank. Her crew were rescued.
Sarah	United Kingdom	The fishing smack was run down and sunk by the fishing trawler Primrose (United Kingdom) 5 nautical miles (9.3 km) off Skerries, County Dublin with the loss of three of her four crew. The survivor was rescued by Primrose.
Victoria	New South Wales	The schooner was run into by the steamship Fiado (United Kingdom) at Sydney and sank.

== 24 July ==
List of shipwrecks: 24 July 1890
Ship	State	Description
Buenos Aires	Germany	The steamship was wrecked on "Rosa Island". She was on a voyage from Hamburg to a port in Brazil.
Unnamed	United Kingdom	The coble sank off Scarborough, Yorkshire with the loss of both crew.

== 25 July ==
List of shipwrecks: 25 July 1890
Ship	State	Description
Vorwarts	Germany	The steamship was destroyed by fire off Savona, Italy. She was on a voyage from New York to Savona.

== 26 July ==
List of shipwrecks: 26 July 1890
Ship	State	Description
Charles Morand	United States	The steamship sank without loss of life in 160 feet (49 m) of water in the North Atlantic Ocean east of Cape May, New Jersey, after colliding with the schooner Zacheus Sherman (United States). She was on a voyage from New York to Vera Cruz, Mexico.
Fu Yew	China	The steamship was driven ashore and wrecked on the Shantung Promontory. She was on a voyage from Shanghai to Newchwang.

== 27 July ==
List of shipwrecks: 27 July 1890
Ship	State	Description
Charles Morand	United Kingdom	The steamship collided with a schooner and sank off the Delaware Breakwater, United States. Her crew were rescued
Seatoller	United Kingdom	The barque was lost off Staten Island, New York United States with the loss of eight of her thirteen crew. She was on a voyage from Glasgow, Renfrewshire to Valparaíso, Chile.

== 28 July ==
List of shipwrecks: 28 July 1890
Ship	State	Description
Snow Queen	Dominion of Canada	The schooner was wrecked off Anticosti Island, Quebec. Her crew survived.
Thomas Pope	United States	The 226.86-ton, 100.6-foot (30.7 m) whaling bark was wrecked in the Chukchi Sea on the coast of the District of Alaska near Point Hope during a gale. Her twelve crew members all survived and were rescued by the steamship William Lewis and the brig F. A. Barstow (both United States).

== 29 July ==
List of shipwrecks: 29 July 1890
Ship	State	Description
Franconia	United States	The steamship was destroyed by fire at Fernandina Beach, Florida. She was on a voyage from New York to Fernandina Beach.

== 30 July ==
List of shipwrecks: 30 July 1890
Ship	State	Description
Annie	United Kingdom	The lighter foundered in the Bristol Channel. Both crew were rescued by the tug O.O.K.P. (United Kingdom). Annie was being towed from Briton Ferry to Swansea, Glamorgan.
Jane Radcliffe	United Kingdom	The steamship caught fire at Penarth, Glamorgan. The fire was extinguished.

== 31 July ==
List of shipwrecks: 31 July 1890
Ship	State	Description
Agnes	United Kingdom	The fishing boat was run into by another vessel. Her crew were rescued. She was towed in to Lamlash, Isle of Arran.
Esca	United Kingdom	The steam launch sank in Lune Bay. Her crew were rescued by the fishing smack Lily (United Kingdom). Esca was on a voyage from Liverpool, Lancashire to Glasgow, Renfrewshire.
Grimsby	United Kingdom	The steamship ran aground on the "Marne Sands". She was refloated and resumed her voyage.
Isabella Stewart	United Kingdom	The schooner ran aground at Ballynass, County Londonderry. She was on a voyage from Ballynass to Runcorn, Cheshire. She was refloated.
Oliver Ann	United States	The schooner was wrecked at Burin, Newfoundland Colony.
St. Margaret'	Austria-Hungary	The full-rigged ship was sighted off Cape Horn, Chile. She was on a voyage from La Plata, Argentina to Valparaíso, Chile. No further trace, reported missing.
White Wings	United Kingdom	The yacht foundered off the coast of Aberdeenshire with the loss of all three people on board.

== Unknown date ==
List of shipwrecks: Unknown date in July 1890
Ship	State	Description
Auguste	Germany	The barque was driven ashore at Port Augusta, South Australia. She was refloated on 25 July.
Christoph Columb	France	The barque was run down and sunk in the Grand Banks of Newfoundland by the steamship Obdam (Netherlands) with the loss of four of her 26 crew. Survivors were rescued by Obdam.
Cito	Denmark	The schooner was abandoned at sea. She was taken in to Lillesand, Norway on 9 July.
Esperance	France	The cutter was discovered in the English Channel in a derelict condition. She was towed in to Jersey, Channel Islands by the steamship Commerce (United Kingdom of Great Britain and Ireland) Guernsey).
Fiducia	Germany	The steamship ran aground at Vensholmen, Denmark on or before 17 July. She was refloated and resumed her voyage.
Iddesleigh	United Kingdom	The ship was driven ashore in the Rio Grande. She was refloated and found to be severely leaky.
Ipenanza	Norway	The barque collided with an iceberg and sank in the Atlantic Ocean. Four of her crew took to a boat; they were rescued twelve days later by the barque Foynland (Norway).
Isaac May	Dominion of Canada	The steamship was destroyed by fire in the Atlantic Ocean. Her crew were rescued by Saranac (United States).
J. Alhana	Dominion of Canada	The schooner was crushed by ice and sank in the Strait of Belle Isle. Her crew survived.
John S. Emery	Flag unknown	The ship caught fire at Newcastle, New South Wales.
Julia	Sweden	The schooner was wrecked on the Sarwi Shoal in mid-July. She was on a voyage from Stockholm to Ostrobothnia.
Lalla Rookh	United Kingdom	The barque was driven ashore. She was on a voyage from Antwerp, Belgium to Valparaíso Chile. She was refloated and towed in to Dover, Kent.
Lowlands	United Kingdom	The steamship ran aground at Cape Pine, Newfoundland Colony. She was on a voyage from Coosaw Island, South Carolina, United States to Hamburg, Germany. She was refloated and put in to Saint John's, Newfoundland Colony in a leaky condition. She was placed under repair.
Novice	United Kingdom	The ship was driven ashore on the African coast. She was looted and wrecked by the local inhabitants.
Pioneer	Dominion of Canada	The steamship was wrecked in a hurricane at Bull River, British Columbia.
Regina	United Kingdom	The steamship collided with the steamship Main (Germany) and sank in the Hooghly River.
Sainte Nathalie	France	The schooner was driven ashore and wrecked on the coast of Iceland. She was on a voyage from Iceland to Gravelines, Nord.
Savona	Chile	The barque was driven ashore and wrecked at Point Rogers before 26 July. She was on a voyage from Valparaíso to Port Townsend, Washington, United States.
Signe	Norway	The steamship was wrecked on the Fish Cayes, in the Abaco Islands. She was on a voyage from Port Morant, Jamaica to Philadelphia, Pennsylvania, United States.
Sirene	United Kingdom	The barque caught fire at Brunswick, Georgia, United States. The fire was extinguished. She was on a voyage from Brunswick to Rotterdam, South Holland, Netherlands.
Speranza	Norway	The barque struck an iceberg and sank in the Atlantic Ocean. Her fourteen crew took to two boats; Ten were rescued ten days later by the barque Askow (Flag unknown). The other four were rescued by Foynland(Norway). Speranza was on a voyage from Shediac, New Brunswick, Dominion of Canada to Liverpool, Lancashire, or vice versa.
William Rice	United States	The fishing vessel was lost in the Atlantic Ocean with the loss of all sixteen crew.
