= List of Mighty Avengers story arcs =

Featured here is a chronological list of story arcs in the comic book series Mighty Avengers created by Brian Michael Bendis and Frank Cho. The series started after the Civil War cross over. Bendis left the series after issue #20 and moved to working on the Dark Avengers series.

== Brian Michael Bendis era ==
=== Ultron Initiative (Issues #1-6) ===
- Writer: Brian Michael Bendis, Artist: Frank Cho

Set during The Initiative storyline, the new team is introduced with Iron Man, The Wasp, Black Widow, Ms. Marvel, Wonder Man, The Sentry, and Ares. The team is assembled to fight Mole Man's creatures, while a series of natural disasters are reported around the world. In the heat of battle, Iron Man's systems are overloaded, morphing him into a beautiful woman who resembles Janet Van Dyne, The Wasp. It is she who figures out that this is the new and improved Ultron.

The Avengers battle Ultron, while Hank Pym is summoned by Black Widow, who has taken over the direction of S.H.I.E.L.D. Ultron distracts the Avengers with multiple versions of Iron Man's armor, while she disappears from the battlefield to attack The Sentry's wife. When the Sentry discovers what Ultron has done, he battles her while Ares develops a plan to defeat Ultron with Ant-Man's help. Ares infects Ultron with a virus, which causes her form to revert to Tony Stark's body. The Sentry's wife is revealed to be alive, and Spider-Woman arrives at the end to warn Tony Stark about the Skrull invasion.

=== Venombomb (Issues #7-11) ===
- Writer: Brian Michael Bendis, Artist: Mark Bagley

In a cross over with New Avengers, Spider-Woman reveals that Elektra was actually a Skrull in disguise. Tony Stark realizes this is a hint of a full-scale alien invasion. Spider-Woman joins the team, as The Avengers battle everyone in New York City, who have been transformed into symbiotes by a virus dropped from space after the Ultron attack. Iron Man discovers that the fallen satellite belongs to Victor Von Doom, so he gathers The Avengers and takes the fight to Latveria. Iron Man, The Sentry and Doom are sent into the past by Doom's time platform, and The Sentry battles The Thing, while Iron Man convinces Doom to return them to the present time. Once The Avengers return, they battle Doom and eventually arrest him for terrorist crimes against humanity.

=== Secret Invasion (Issues #12-19) ===
- Writer: Brian Michael Bendis, Artists: Alex Maleev, Khoi Pham, John Romita Jr., Stefano Caselli

During the Secret Invasion crossover, the Mighty Avengers featured a different tie-in story each month; each featuring a different character not necessarily in the Mighty Avengers Team.

Issue #12
- This issue dealt with Nick Fury and his part in Spider-Woman joining The Avengers.

Issue #13
- This issue featured Nick Fury and his new Howling Commandos.

Issue #14
- This issue featured The Sentry dealing with the Skrull invasion.

Issue #15
- This issue dealt with Hank Pym's abduction and replacement by a Skrull.

Issue #16
- This issue dealt with Elektra's abduction and replacement by a Skrull.

Issue #17
- This issue dealt with the Skrull who impersonated Hank Pym, and leads directly into his appearance in Mighty Avengers #3.

Issue #18
- This issue featured Nick Fury and his new Howling Commandos.

Issue #19

- This issue dealt with Khn'nr, the Skrull who impersonated the Kree Captain Marvel, and Noh-Varr, who becomes the new Captain Marvel.

=== Secret Invasion Epilogue (Issue #20) ===
This issue dealt with the aftermath of the Skrull invasion. Hank Pym deals with the loss of his wife The Wasp, while having to learn what has happened while he was imprisoned by the Skrulls (House of M, Civil War, the death of Captain America, and World War Hulk). At his wife's funeral he takes his anger out at Tony Stark, before Thor takes him away to mourn in private.

== Dan Slott era ==
=== Chaos Cascade (Issues #21-23) ===
- Writer: Dan Slott, Artist: Khoi Pham

With a series of events causing chaos around the world, the Scarlet Witch recruits a new team of Avengers while Hercules tries to do the same. Hank Pym assumes the identity of Wasp, and the Scarlet Witch sends the Avengers to deal with the threat at Mount Wundagore, where it becomes apparent that her brother Quicksilver is being used as a vessel for Chthon. Iron Man arrives after battling the Hulk in Wundagore and challenges Wasp for leadership, but leaves after helping them to defeat Chthon. The new team led by Wasp includes Hercules, Amadeus Cho, and the U.S. Agent, plus Stature and Vision from the Young Avengers. It is also revealed that the "Scarlet Witch" is actually Loki in disguise, who is manipulating the Avengers in order to embarrass Norman Osborn.

=== Chasing Ghosts (Issues #24) ===
- Writer: Dan Slott, Artist: Rafa Sandoval

The Mighty Avengers become an international team, following information from the "Scarlet Witch" to dozens of hot spots around the globe. Quicksilver, who initially did not want to join, chases the Avengers from country to country in search of his sister, and eventually joins the team after helping them defeat Titan.

=== Mighty/Fantastic (Issues #25-26) ===
- Writer: Dan Slott, Artist: Stephen Segovia

In escaping H.A.M.M.E.R. agents, Jocasta inadvertently untethered the Mighty Avengers' "PymPocket" base from reality, causing its dimensional doorways to slowly fade. Hank Pym contacts Reed Richards, hoping to borrow a device that had been left in the Fantastic Four's care by Bill Foster. Reed refuses, and Pym decides to have his team break in the Baxter Building and steal the device. Despite Reed's best attempts, Pym is successful, and manages to move the Pym Pocket to a new dimensional location. However, the degradation of the dimensional gateways requires Jocasta to be integrated into the system in order to hold it together.

=== The Unspoken (Issues #27-31) ===
- Writer: Dan Slott Artist: Khoi Pham

While the rest of the team settles into their new base, "The Infinite Avengers Mansion", U.S. Agent and Quicksilver encounter The Unspoken in China. Quicksilver explains that The Unspoken was the Inhumans' former king, before he was deposed and banished by his cousin Black Bolt for his power-hungry ways. Before the two can act, The People's Defense Force (China's Superteam) accost The Unspoken, demanding he leave the country. The Unspoken responds by defeating them in an instant, prompting U.S. Agent to suggest calling not just their team, but all the Avengers teams to combat such a threat.

Meanwhile, Stature desires revenge against the Scarlet Witch for the death of her father and has lured the Young Avengers to assist her. Ronin (Clint Barton) follows them, also desiring revenge against "Wanda". During the fight, Wiccan uses his powers to break through Loki's illusion, but the villain retreats before he is fully revealed.

While Hercules and Amadeus call the other Avengers teams for help, U.S. Agent, Quicksilver and the recovered Chinese heroes attack The Unspoken, who uses Xerogen Crystal powder to turn them into Alpha Primitives. The other Avengers (barring Osborn's groups) join the battle, but many of them also succumb to the powder's effects.

At the same time, Pym is exploring the outer reaches of existence. There, he encounters Eternity, who thanks him for saving his being from succumbing to the chaos wave, and tells him that he is the universe's Scientist Supreme. Upon his return to the universe, Pym marshalls the remaining Avengers, having Amadeus and Hercules infiltrate the "Slave Engine", which contains a supply of Xerogen Crystals, and disable it. Pym then uses the engine's chronal ray, used to accelerate the growth of the crystals, on The Unspoken, turning him into a weak old man.

=== Mighty/Dark (Issues #32-33) ===
- Writer: Dan Slott Artist: Khoi Pham

Loki engineers the escape of Crusher Creel, manipulating him into raiding Project Pegasus, bringing Norman Osborn's Dark Avengers to the scene. He also takes on Scarlet Witch's appearance once more in order to bring the Mighty Avengers to the same place. As Osborn's group is in the middle of a press conference, he can not afford to fight Pym's publicly popular team, and grudgingly joins forces with them. Creel then appears, having absorbed the power of a Cosmic Cube fragment. As their two teams attempt to stop Creel, Pym and Osborn both realise that Creel's wrecking ball, which shares his powers, has also turned into a Cosmic Cube, and race to retrieve it. Osborn is first, but Pym tricks him into believing that he had already gotten it, claiming that the Dark Reign was made possible by the Cube's power. Pym then knocks Osborn out, and uses the Cube as a weapon against Creel, with limited results. Loki then appears, and provides Osborn with a mystical blade, which has the ability to remove Creel's Asgardian-born powers. Using the weapon, Osborn defeats Creel, making himself look like a hero in the eyes of the watching media. Osborn uses his status as head of H.A.M.M.E.R to decommission U.S. Agent, removing him from the Mighty Avengers. Pym's Avengers return to the Infinite Mansion, where Pym consoles himself with the fact that he recorded Loki's image, and now has a scan of his retina.

=== Pre-Siege Mentality (Issue #34) ===
- Writer: Dan Slott Artist: Neil Edwards

Hank Pym is finally forced to tell Pietro that the "Scarlet Witch" is actually Loki in disguise. Desperate to find out where Wanda is, Pietro joins the team in an attempt to capture Loki. The Mighty Avengers go to the Isle of Silence, to a palace where Loki makes an annual pilgrimage. When Loki arrives, he is captured by device designed by Pym, which manages to nullify his magic, trapping him. Pietro demands to know where Wanda is, using Pym's device to torture Loki when he claims not to know. Loki mentally calls Thor for help, who briefly battles the Mighty Avengers. Pym agrees to release Loki, in return for him truthfully answer Pietro question. Loki truthfully answers that he does not know where Wanda is. Pym then requests that Loki join his team, to the shock and disgust of the others. Loki declines, and is taken by Thor to Balder, and the rest of the team decide to leave, believing Pym has gone too far. Back at the Infinity Mansion, Jocasta, who has been experiencing problems with her duplicate bodies, is overwhelmed by the programming of Ultron, her eyes glowing red.

=== Salvation (Issue #35-36) ===
Ultron is shown to infiltrate Jocasta and the Infinite Avengers Mansion. He names himself Ultron Pym and seeks to kill and replace his father before using his Infinite Mansion to conquer the universe. Amadeus Cho, now on his own after the death of Hercules, receives word that the Thunderbolts have been sent by Norman Osborn to steal a powerful spear belonging to Odin. He calls on U.S.Agent, Stature and Vision for help stopping them. Pym is eventually able to make Ultron leave by marrying him to Jocasta. He then goes to help Amadeus Cho and his team, battling as The Mighty Avengers one last time.
