= USS Titan =

USS Titan may refer to:

- USS Titan, a fictional aircraft carrier in Battlefield 4
- USS Titan (NCC-80102), a fictional spacecraft in the Star Trek universe
- USS Titan (NCC-80102-A), a fictional spacecraft in the Star Trek universe

== See also ==
- Star Trek: Titan, a novel series involving the USS Titan
- Titan (disambiguation)
