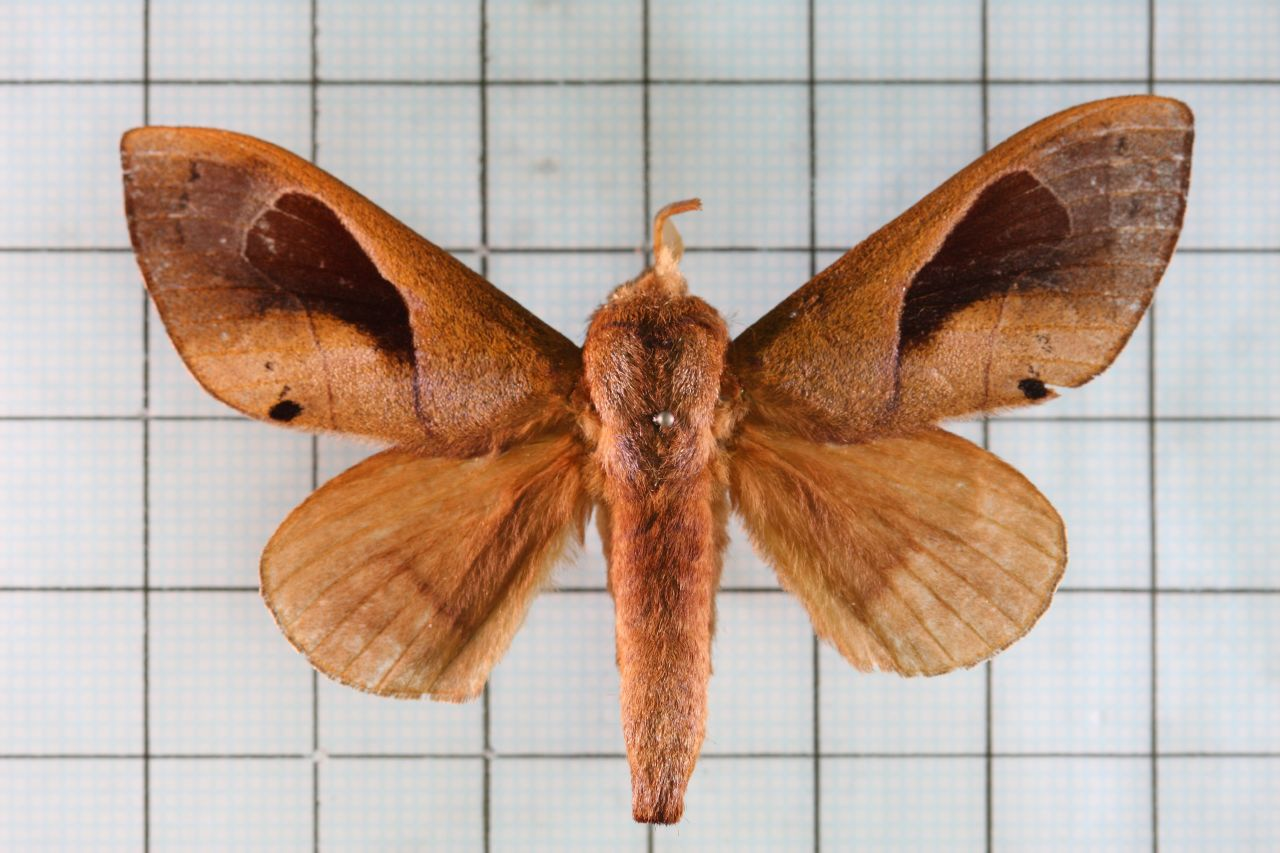

Scientific classification
- Kingdom: Animalia
- Phylum: Arthropoda
- Class: Insecta
- Order: Lepidoptera
- Family: Lasiocampidae
- Genus: Paralebeda
- Species: P. plagifera

Binomial name
- Paralebeda plagifera (Walker, 1855)

Synonyms
- Lebeda plagifera Walker, 1855; Odonestis urda Swinhoe, 1915; Paralebeda urda backi Lajonquiere, 1980

= Paralebeda plagifera =

Species of moth

Paralebeda plagifera is a moth of the family Lasiocampidae. It is found in northern and central India, Nepal, southern and south-eastern China, northern Thailand, northern Vietnam and Taiwan.

The wingspan is about 59–94 mm.

The larvae have been recorded feeding on Macaranga tanarius.
