= Teen Titans (disambiguation) =

Teen Titans is the name of a comic book series by DC Comics.

Teen Titans may also refer to:

- Teen Titans (TV series), an animated television series based on the comic book series
- Teen Titans Go!, a subsequent animated television series with the same characters
- Teen Titans (2005 video game), a video game released for the Game Boy Advance
- Teen Titans (2006 video game), a video game released for the GameCube, PlayStation 2, and Xbox

== See also ==
- "Teens and Titans", an episode of Super Café
- Titan (comics)
- Titan (disambiguation)
- Teen (disambiguation)
