= Project Titan =

Project Titan or Titan Project may refer to:

- Apple electric car project, with autonomous driving
- Project Titan (DEA), a 2004 international operation targeting drug trafficking and money laundering
- Tesla subsidiary SolarCity's project to secretly replace defective solar panels
- Titan (Blizzard Entertainment project).
- Time Crisis: Project Titan, a 2001 videogame
- "Project Titan", a fictional spacecraft from Titan A.E.
- "ProjectTitan" as the SmartGaGa project
- Titan Project, a defunct MMO videogame in the Halo (series)

== See also ==
- Titan (disambiguation)
- Titan Wind Project, windfarm
