= Titan (crane) =

Floating crane

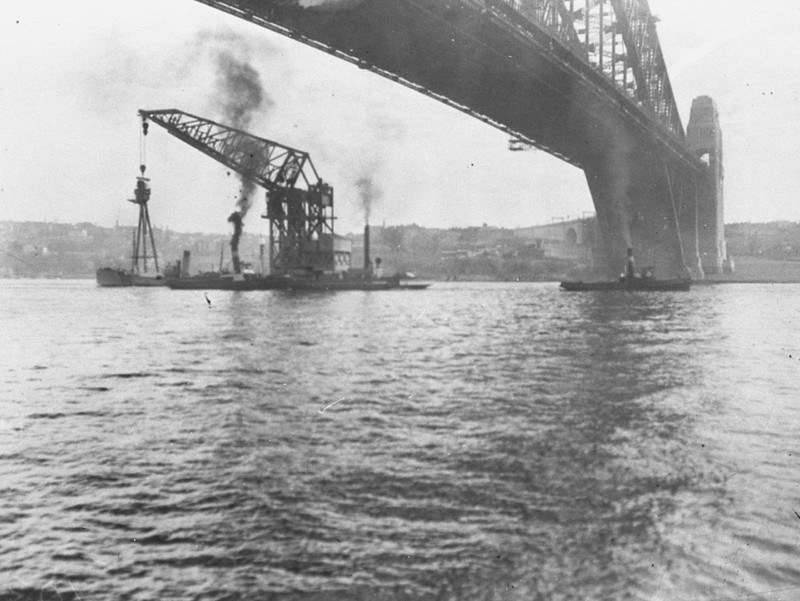
- The floating crane Titan, being towed under the Sydney Harbour Bridge with the foremast of HMAS Sydney in 1929. The mast is to be installed at Bradleys Head.

History

Australia
- Name: Titan
- Ordered: 5 October 1916
- Builder: Cowans, Sheldon & Co., Carlisle, England
- Launched: 5 December 1917
- Completed: 3 December 1919
- In service: 1919
- Out of service: 1991
- Home port: Cockatoo Island Dockyard
- Fate: Scuttled, 29 December 1992

General characteristics
- Type: Crane vessel
- Displacement: 2,125 tonnes (2,091 long tons; 2,342 short tons)
- Length: 176 ft (54 m)
- Beam: 79 ft 8 in (24.28 m)
- Draught: 13 ft (4.0 m)
- Propulsion: None
- Capacity: Lift of 150 tonnes (148 long tons; 165 short tons)
- Armament: None

Titan was a floating crane that operated in Sydney Harbour from 1919 until 1991. She was fabricated in Carlisle in the United Kingdom and then sent to Cockatoo Island Dockyard in Sydney for assembly before entering service with the Royal Australian Navy (RAN).

After being declared surplus to requirements, the crane became the property of Cockatoo Island Dockyard, which operated it until the dockyard's closure in 1991. Although heritage-listed, Titan was sold to a Singaporean company, and authorisation was given to tow her to Singapore in 1992. During the tow, the crane's barge inverted on 24 December, and the crane was scuttled five days later.

== Design and construction ==
Titan was fabricated in the United Kingdom during World War I by Cowans, Sheldon & Company of Carlisle, then transported to Australia in parts for assembly at Cockatoo Island Dockyard, Sydney. Ordered on 5 October 1916, construction at Cockatoo commenced on 7 March 1917. The crane was launched on 5 December 1917. However, during construction, the 40-ton lead screws for the crane's jib arm were lost when the merchant ship Africa was torpedoed. The crane could be used in a limited capability, although it was not until 1919 that replacement screws of sufficient quality were acquired. Titan was completed on 3 December 1919. On completion, the crane was handed over to the RAN.

Titan's cantilever-jib arm could reach 190 feet (58 m) above the surface at maximum extension. The crane could lift up to 150 tonnes (150 long tons; 170 short tons) at an arm radius of 90 feet (27 m), or 125 tonnes (123 long tons; 138 short tons) at 125 feet (38 m). Two 75-tonne (74-long-ton; 83-short-ton) counterweights were used to ballast the load; water ballast tanks could also be used, but this rarely occurred. The crane was supported by a lattice mast fitted to a riveted-steel pontoon barge that was 176 feet (54 m) long, 79 feet 8 inches (24.28 m) wide, and had a depth of 13 feet (4.0 m). The crane was not self-propelled, and required two or three tugboats to manoeuvre her around. Power for lifting and rotating was supplied by a coal-fired boiler supplying three steam generators (two 220 kilowatt generators and a 44 kilowatt auxiliary). The only connection between the crane arm and the lattice mast were drive shafts for the slewing (rotational) motors. Titan had a maximum displacement of 2,125 tonnes (2,091 long tons; 2,342 short tons).

== Operational history ==
Titan's main purpose was to provide heavy lifting services for Cockatoo Island Dockyard; installing ships' boilers and propulsion equipment, transporting heavy machinery to and from the island, and launching small craft. The crane also saw use unloading heavy deck cargo from ships, assisted in the construction of power plants, bridges, and other structures around Sydney Harbour and the attached tributaries, and was occasionally used for the salvage of vessels sunk in the harbour. Early in her career, the crane was used throughout the entire harbour, but the barge's poor seakeeping ability made it dangerous to tow the crane across Sydney Heads, and she was later banned from operating north and east of Bradleys Head.

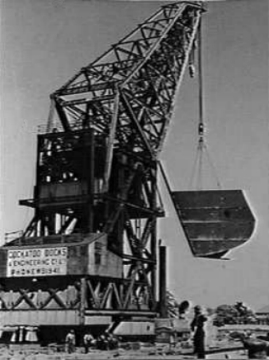
Titan lifting a replacement bow for USS New Orleans in 1943

A modernisation of Titan began in the late 1960s. During the modernisation, the RAN decided that the crane was surplus to requirements, and suspended the upgrade in 1975. Cockatoo Island Dockyard saw the value of keeping Titan in service, and continued the upgrades, including replacement of the steam-powered system with diesel generators.

In 1989, surveyors refused to renew the crane's port craft licence because of the age of the vessel; in particular, rivets used during the pontoon's construction were showing signs of wear-and-tear. The dwindling need for the crane's services and the cost of completely refurbishing the craft saw the dockyard remove Titan from commercial service in 1991. Approval for short-term projects was granted over the following two years, including the unloading and reloading of the locomotive Flying Scotsman during its visit to Australia, and the dismantling of a shore-based crane at Cockatoo Island.

== Sinking ==
After the closure of Cockatoo Island Dockyard in 1991, the Australian Government decided to sell Titan. She was initially sold in April 1992 to a New Zealand company, which originally intended to return her to service. However, there was no longer any demand for the crane's services in Sydney, and Titan was on-sold to the Singapore-based Wirana Shipping Corporation in December 1992. Although Titan was listed for protection under the Protection of Moveable Cultural Heritage Act 1986, permission to export the crane to Singapore was approved on the condition that she return to Sydney by July 1995. The crane left Sydney Harbour on 23 December 1992, towed by Wirana's Rapuhia, a former research vessel. Although Rapuhia was physically capable of towing the crane, she was unregistered, and several safety certifications had expired or lapsed.

10 minutes before 23:00 on 24 December, observers aboard Rapuhia felt the ship jerk, and noticed that the navigational lights on Titan were no longer visible; further inspection found that the tow-line had snapped, and the barge was found nearby, having rolled over. The official report states that Rapuhia towed the barge south to a suitable area for scuttling, but several people involved in the salvage and scuttling operation claim that the towing cable wrapped around the propeller shafts, and both Rapuhia and Titan drifted without control until divers cut the cable free. The crane arm fell off while the pontoon was inverted.

The barge was manoeuvred to a point 2 nautical miles (3.7 km; 2.3 mi) south-east of Camden Head. After several days inspection, it was determined that the remains could not be salvaged, and plans were made to scuttle her. A combination of a lift balloon and the cutting of holes in the bilges allowed the barge to be brought from an inverted position to roughly 90 degrees from vertical, before she was scuttled on 29 December at 09:00, sinking in 33 metres (108 ft) of water. 31.664267°S 152.873330°E Subsequent investigation by the Australian Department of Transport and Communication found that several rivets had failed on the starboard side of the pontoon, causing it to take large volumes of water. This loss of stability, combined with ocean and water conditions, plus the stresses of the tow, resulted in Titan rolling over and capsizing.
