= Titan (comics) =

Titan, in comic books, can refer to:

== DC Comics ==
- Titan, the moon of Saturn in DC Comics inhabited by telepaths in the 30th century of the Legion of Super-Heroes
- Titan (New Gods), a New Gods giant from Darkseid's Elite
- "Titan" or "Teen Titan", a member of the DC Comics superhero team Teen Titans

== Marvel Comics ==
- Titan (Marvel Comics location), the moon of Saturn in Marvel Comics and home to the Titanian Eternals
- Titan (Imperial Guard), a member of the Shi'ar Imperial Guard

== Other uses ==
- Titan (Dark Horse Comics), a Dark Horse Comics character
- Titan (Image Comics), an Image Comics character
- Titan Books, a publisher of comic reprints

== See also ==
- Teen Titans (disambiguation)
- Titan (disambiguation)
