= Sarah Deal =

United States Marine Corps officer and aviator

Sarah Deal Burrow
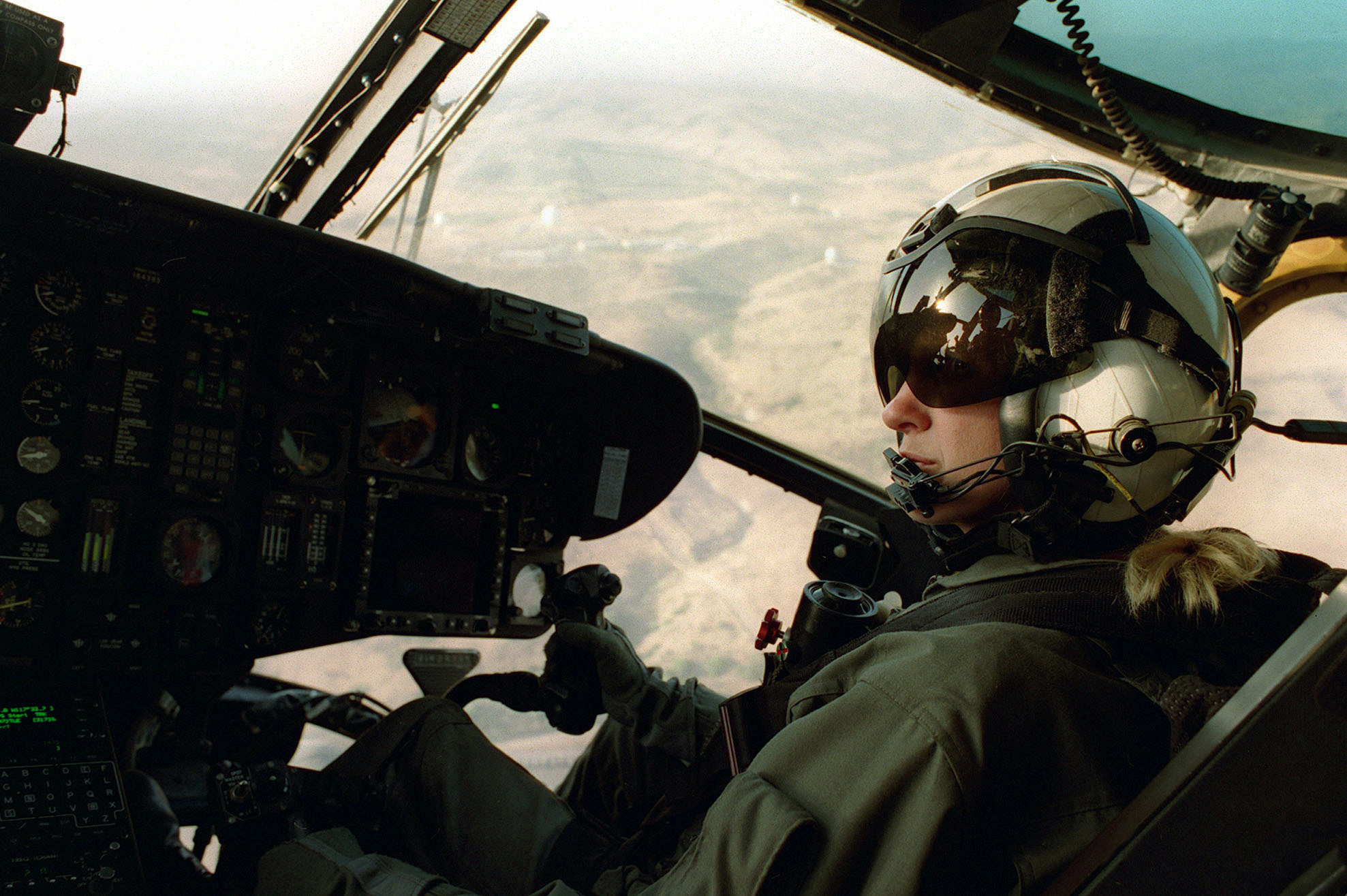
- Born: September 14, 1969 (age 57)
- Military career
- Allegiance: United States of America
- Branch: United States Marine Corps
- Service years: 1992 - present
- Rank: Lieutenant Colonel
- Units: HMH-466; HMH-769

Lieutenant Colonel Sarah Deal Burrow, United States Marine Corps, is the first female Marine who selected for Naval aviation training in 1993, and subsequently became the Marine Corps' first female aviator in 1995.

== Early life ==
Sarah Deal was born to Richard and Marjorie Deal, in Bowling Green, Ohio on 14 September 1969. The daughter of a Marine, she grew up in Pemberville, Ohio. She was an athlete, participating in cross country, track and basketball, as well as 4H and her church youth group. She also worked on a dairy farm and raised one pig a year she would sell at auction. Deal earned a Bachelor of Science degree in aerospace flight technology from Kent State University in 1992.

== Military career ==
Deal was commissioned as a second lieutenant in the Marine Corps in May 1992. Though she had already earned her pilot's license while in college, the Marine Corps did not yet have any female aviators. After The Basic School in Quantico, she attended air traffic control school. When U.S. military policy was changed to allow women to fly combat aircraft in 1993, Deal requested to become an aviator. She was selected for training in July 1993. She began her flight training at Naval Air Station Pensacola in the T-34C Turbo Mentor aircraft. She went on to helicopter training in the TH-57 Sea Ranger helicopter and earned her aviator's wings on April 21, 1995.

Deal was assigned to Marine Heavy Helicopter Squadron 466 as a CH-53E pilot.

Deal completed her active duty service in 2004 and transferred to the Marine Corps Reserve. In May 2006, Deal was assigned to HMH-769 where she served as a reserve CH-53E pilot.

In 2009, Deal deployed to Afghanistan with Marine Aircraft Group 40, supporting the 2d Marine Expeditionary Brigade during Operation Enduring Freedom.

As of July 2016, she was a LtCol serving in the Marine Corps Reserve.

== Personal life ==
Deal is married to Philip M. Burrow, a former Navy F-14 Tomcat pilot she met while in flight school. They are the parents of twins Troy and Brandon Burrow and Eric Burrow.

== Honors ==
Deal was inducted into the Ohio Women's Hall of Fame in 1999.

== See also ==
- Vernice Armour, first African-American female U.S. Marine Corps aviator (July 2001)
