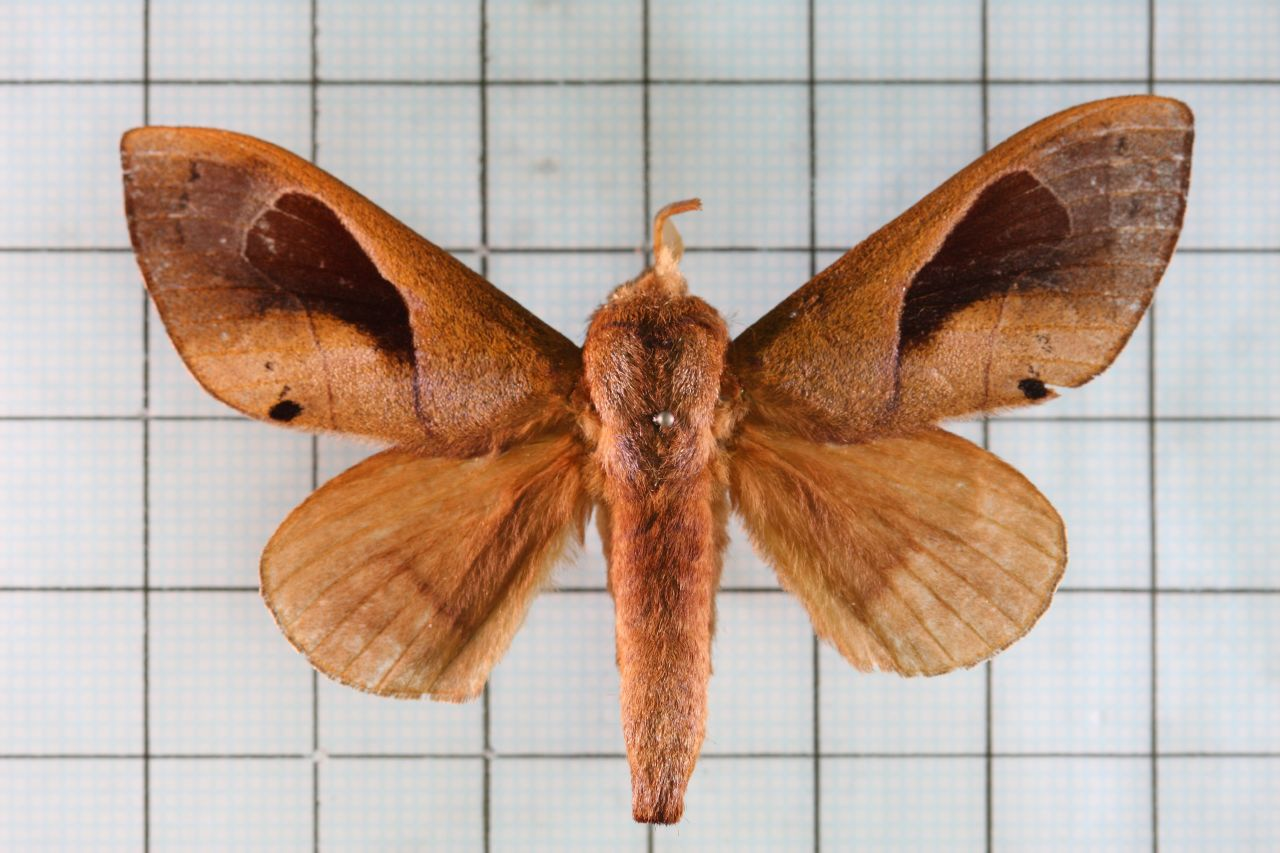
- Paralebeda plagifera

Scientific classification
- Domain: Eukaryota
- Kingdom: Animalia
- Phylum: Arthropoda
- Class: Insecta
- Order: Lepidoptera
- Family: Lasiocampidae
- Genus: Paralebeda; Aurivillius, 1894

= Paralebeda =

Genus of moths

Paralebeda is a genus of moths in the family Lasiocampidae. The genus was erected by Per Olof Christopher Aurivillius in 1894.

== Species ==
- Paralebeda achillesi Zolotuhin, Treadaway & Witt, 1998
  - Paralebeda achillesi mindoroensis Zolotuhin, Treadaway & Witt, 1998
- Paralebeda crinodes (Felder, 1868)
  - Paralebeda crinodes paos Zolotuhin, 1996
  - Paralebeda crinodes uniformis Holloway, 1976
- Paralebeda dimorpha Zolotuhin & Witt, 2005
- Paralebeda eggerti Zolotuhin & Witt, 2005
- Paralebeda femorata (Ménétriés, 1858)
- Paralebeda flores Zolotuhin & Witt, 2005
- Paralebeda lagua Zolotuhin, Treadaway & Witt, 1998
- Paralebeda lucifuga (Swinhoe, 1892)
- Paralebeda plagifera (Walker, 1855)
- Paralebeda pluto Zolotuhin, Treadaway & Witt, 1998
- Paralebeda sericeofasciata (Aurivillius, 1921)
- Paralebeda vritra Zolotuhin & J.D. Holloway, 2006
