= Titanic (Nautilus Pompilius album) =

Titanic（Russian:Титаник） is a 1994 album by the Russian band Nautilus Pompilius. The video clip of the title track "Titanic" was one of the most popular on Russian television that year.

== Track listing ==
No.	Title	Length
1.	"Тутанхамон (Tutankhamun)"	4:51
2.	"Титаник (Titanic)"	5:03
3.	"Утро Полины"	5:03
4.	"Негодяй и ангел (Scoundrel and Angel)"	3:45
5.	"К Элоизе (Eloise)"	5:04
6.	"Воздух (Air)"	5:16
7.	"Колёса любви (Wheels of Love)"	2:50
8.	"20 000"	5:08
9.	"Зверь (Beast)"	6:25
