= HMH-769 =

Marine Heavy Helicopter Squadron 769
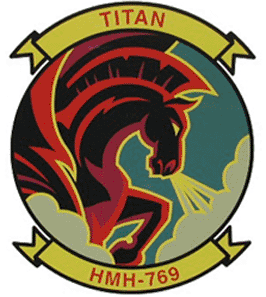
- HMH-769 Unit insignia
- Active: April 15, 1958 - August 2, 2008
- Country: United States
- Branch: USMCR
- Type: Marine Heavy Helicopter Squadron
- Role: Assault Support
- Part of: Marine Aircraft Group 46; 4th Marine Aircraft Wing; Marine Forces Reserve
- Garrison/HQ: Edwards Air Force Base
- Nicknames: "Heavy Haulers"" "Roadhogs"
- Tail Code: 7F (1958-1968) 5F (1968-1972) MS (1972-2008)
- Engagements: Operation Desert Storm; Operation Enduring Freedom

Aircraft flown
- Helicopter: HUP-2; UH-34; CH-53A/D/ RH-53D; CH-53E

Marine Heavy Helicopter Squadron 769 (HMH-769) was a United States Marine Corps CH-53E helicopter squadron. Nicknamed "Titan", the squadron was based at Edwards Air Force Base in California and fell under the command of Marine Aircraft Group 46 (MAG-46) and the 4th Marine Aircraft Wing (4th MAW). HMH-769 was deactivated on 2 August 2008.

== Mission ==
Provide assault support transport of combat troops, supplies and equipment during expeditionary, joint or combined operations. Be prepared for short-notice, worldwide employment in support of Marine Air-Ground Task Force operations.

== History ==
=== Early years ===
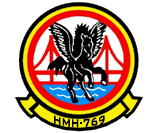
Original squadron patch

HMH-769 was originally activated as Marine Helicopter Transport Squadron (HMR) 769 on April 15, 1958. Based at Naval Air Station Oakland, HMR-769 flew the compact single radial engine, twin overlapping rotor utility helicopter developed and produced by Piasecki Helicopter Corporation.

In April 1959, HMR-769 transitioned to and began flying the Sikorsky built HSS-1/SH-34G.

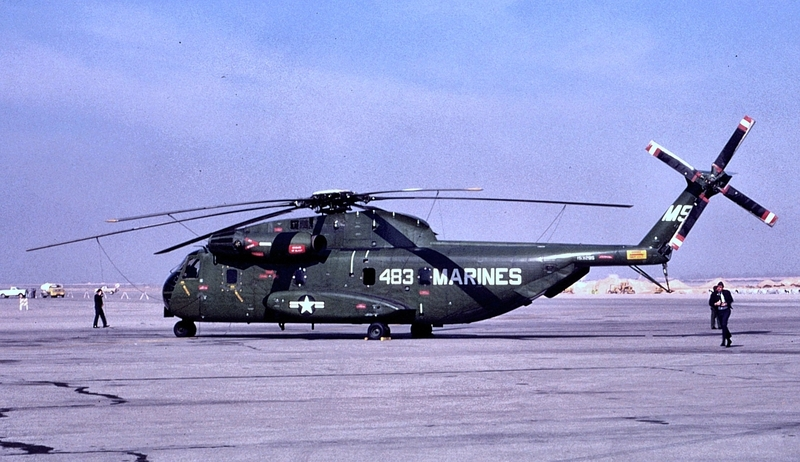
A HMH-769 CH-53A Sea Stallion, circa January 1979

On April 1, 1961, HMR-769 was redesignated Marine Medium Helicopter Squadron (HMM) 769 and relocated to Naval Air Station Alameda in July of that same year.

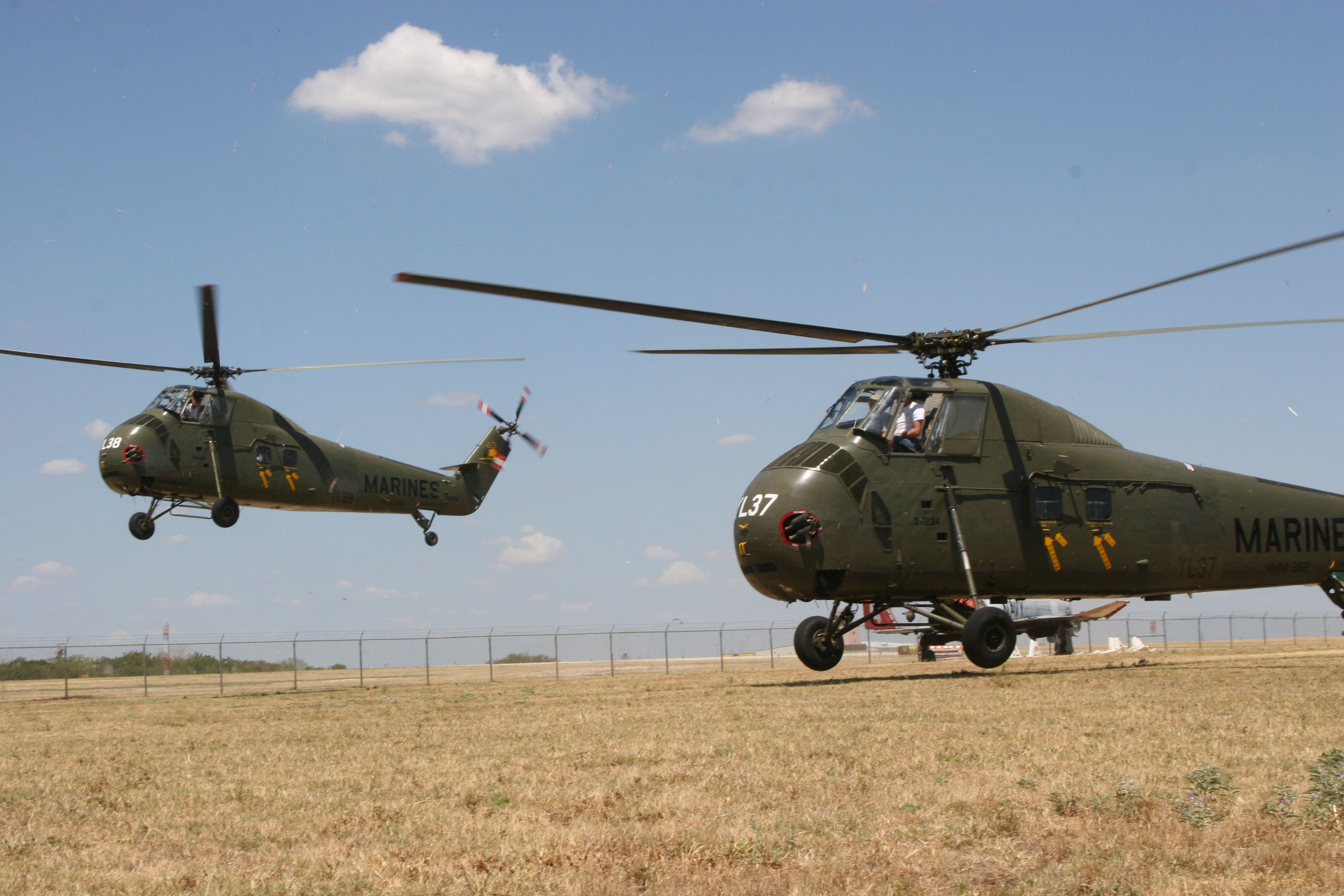
H-34Ds touching down

The squadron continued to fly the H-34 until 1971 when it transitioned to the Sikorsky built CH-53A "Sea Stallion" and on September 1, 1971, was redesignated Marine Heavy Helicopter Squadron (HMH) 769.

The squadron remained HMH-769 until June 1, 1980, when it was deactivated. The squadron's remaining personnel and aircraft were then consolidated into the other Marine Reserve Heavy Helicopter Squadron, HMH-772, redesignated HMH-772 Detachment A and given the callsign "Roadhogs".

=== Persian Gulf War and 1990s ===
In April 1990, HMH-772 Detachment A became the first Marine unit to transition to and fly the former minesweeper RH-53D. With its minesweeping gear removed, the RH-53D proved to be a powerful replacement to the aging CH-53A airframe.

On November 27, 1990, HMH-772 Det A was activated and deployed to Saudi Arabia in support of combat operations for Operations Desert Shield/Desert Storm and served under Marine Aircraft Group 26. HMH-772 operated from Al Jubayl and the expeditionary combat base "Lonesome Dove" while supporting the assault.

Upon conclusion of hostilities in the Persian Gulf, HMH-772 Det A embarked aboard the USS Tarawa (LHA-1) for the return to CONUS. While en route, the Roadhogs were called upon to provide humanitarian assistance and disaster relief (HA/DR) to the country of Bangladesh during Operation Sea Angel.

On 1 April 1993, HMH-772 Det A was redesigned as HMH-769.

On May 1, 1996, the Roadhogs relocated from NAS Alameda to Marine Corps Air Station El Toro. While there, the squadron received its first CH-53E "Super Stallion" on August 23, 1996, replacing its aging RH-53D with the newer, more powerful airframe.

In July 1998, the Roadhogs were the recipient of the Marine Corps Aviation Association's 1998 Pete Ross award for 4th MAW safety.

On May 1, 1999, the Roadhogs relocated to Edwards Air Force Base located in Rosamond, California.

=== Global War on Terror ===
In July 2001, the Roadhogs were the recipient of the Marine Corps Aviation Association's 2001 Pete Ross award for 4th MAW safety.

The Roadhogs were activated for a third time on January 27, 2002, and deployed two aircraft and 17 Marines with the 11th Marine Expeditionary Unit (SOC) to Djibouti in the Horn of Africa; detachment commanded by LtCol Jeff Freeman. This deployment marked the first time that a reserve squadron augmented an Active Forces MEU.

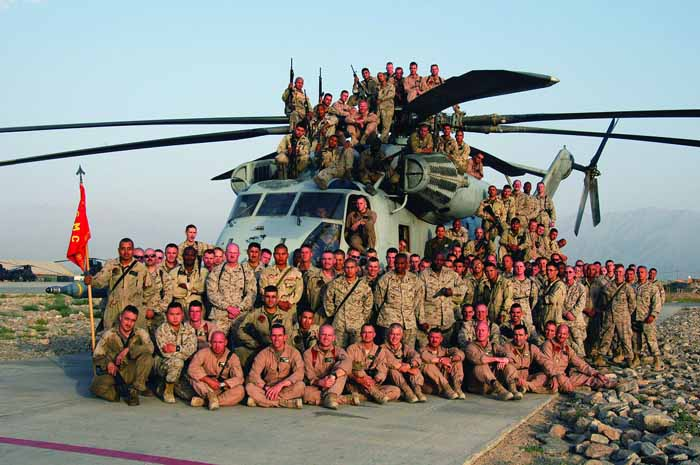
HMH-769 Squadron photo taken in Afghanistan 2005

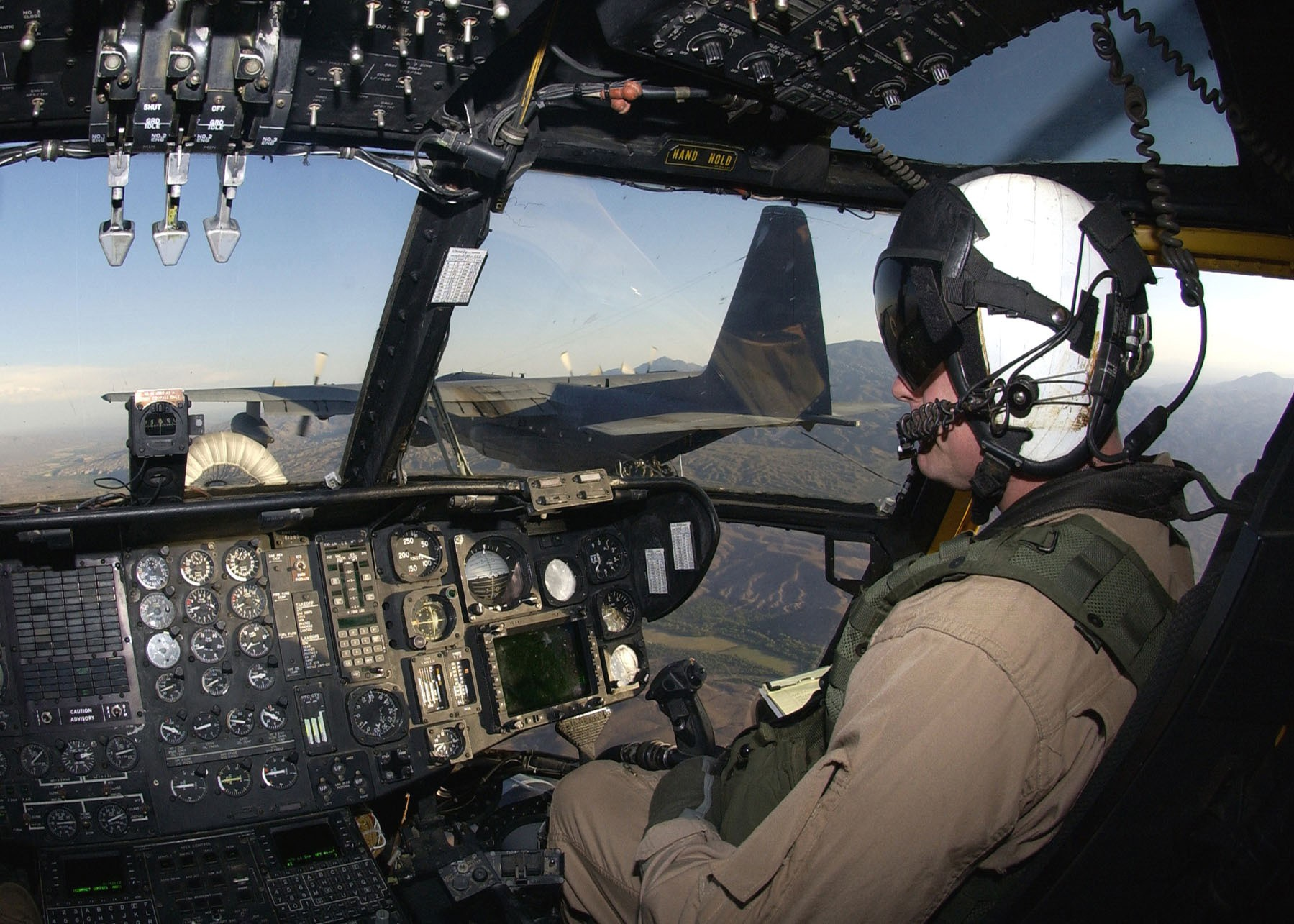
HMH-769 Pilot Maj. David Montesano aerial refuels during 2006 annual training.

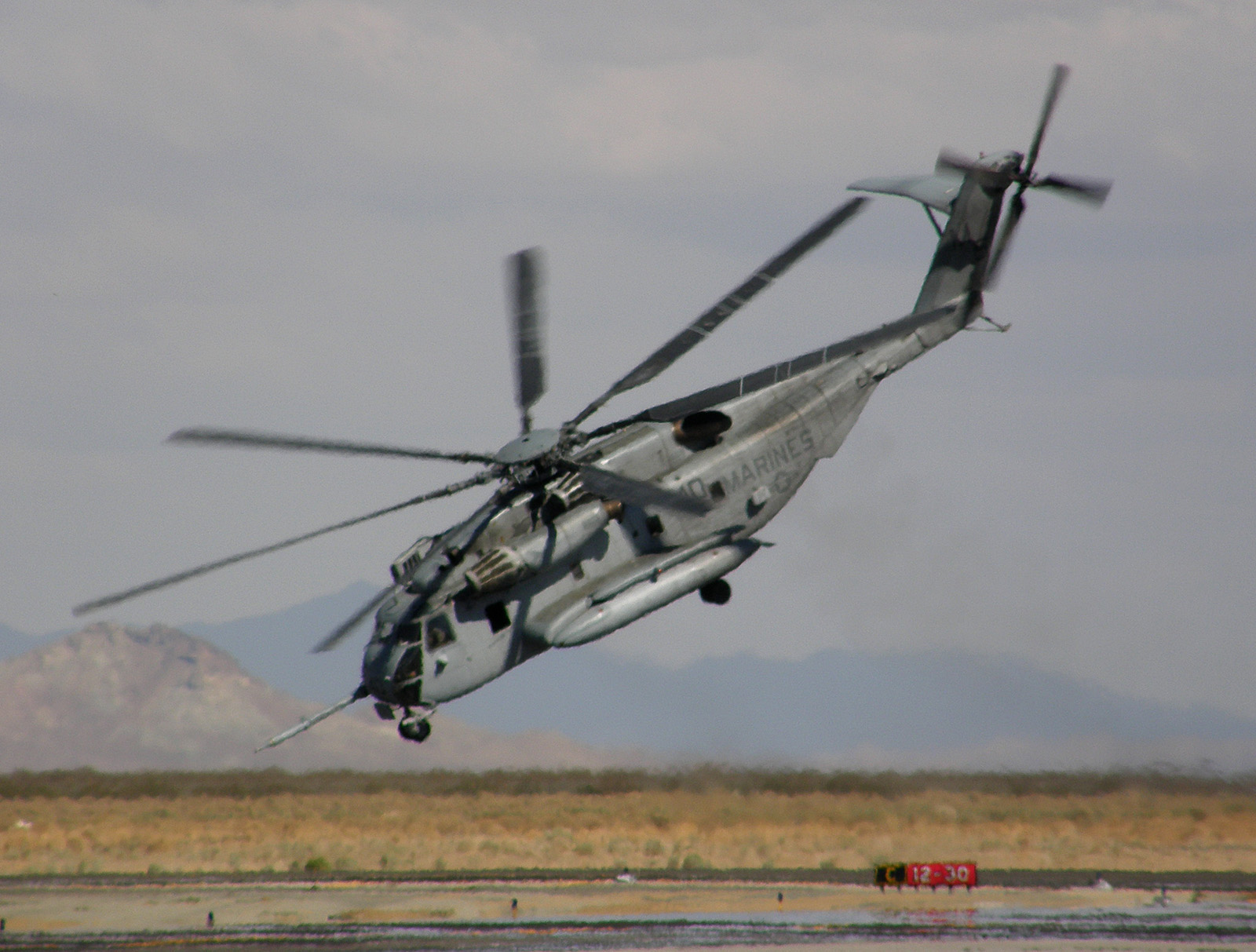
A Roadhog pilot executes a TERF take-off during a flight demonstration at the National Test Pilot School.

Activated for their final time on January 5, 2004, the Roadhogs commanded by LtCol Rick Mullen deployed in March of that same year to Bagram air base in Afghanistan for seven months in support of Combined Joint Task Forces 180/76 for Operation Enduring Freedom 4 and 5.

Midway through their deployment to Afghanistan, the Roadhogs were selected as the Marine Corps Aviation Association's 2005 Keith B. McCutcheon Marine Heavy Helicopter Squadron of the year.

On April 2, 2007, Headquarters Marine Corps directed the deactivation of HMH-772 Det A, with a completion date of no later than September 2008. The following year saw a flurry of activity as the squadron marched toward this milestone, transferring aircraft and personnel consistently throughout the year while still maintaining a rigorous schedule.

On July 23, 2008, aircraft 45 commanded by Major Jodi Maroney departed Edwards AFB for MCAS New River. Major Maroney and her crew arrived MCAS New River on July 27, 2008.

On the night of Saturday March 22, 2008, the Roadhogs began their last Annual Training period by executing section High Level Light (HLL) Night Vision Device (NVD) Confined Area Landings (CAL) in the local training area. Upon the section's return to base, the aircrew were informed that there was an injured climber located approximately 90 miles north on Mount Whitney. The aircrew gathered and reviewed all available information to include location and weather. After conducting deliberate planning and briefing the hop, the aircrew boarded their aircraft and took off for the injured climber.

Once airborne, the aircrew flew direct to Lone Pine Airport, landed and conducted a face-to-face brief with the ground rescue coordinator. When complete with the brief, the aircraft took off and headed direct for the 12,000 MSL plus landing zone (LZ) that had been identified by rescuers at the injured climbers location.

With both aircraft climbing to 14,000 MSL, the section was able to identify the LZ due to GPS coordinates and the headlamps that the ground rescuers were wearing. As lead started setting up to land, dash 2 remained in the overhead to provide coverage and radio relay.

After lead had been in the LZ for roughly 15 minutes, the aircraft departed the LZ with the injured climber aboard and both aircraft returned to Lone Pine Airport to execute the patient transfer to civilian medical services. Once transfer complete, both Roadhog aircraft took off from Lone Pine and headed south to return to Edwards AFB landing around 0300. Due to the quick actions and professionalism of the aircrew, the injured climber reportedly survived his traumatic injuries.

On Monday July 14, 2008, the Roadhogs launched their last two aircraft (section led by Col. Phillips) from Edwards AFB for MCAS New River in North Carolina. On Friday, July 18, 2008, the section landed at MCAS New River, where the aircraft were transferred to HMH-461, Marine Aircraft Group 26, 2nd Marine Aircraft Wing.

On August 2, 2008, HMH-769 was deactivated at Edwards AFB as part of the 2007 Marine Corps Aviation Plan.

=== Reactivation ===
The squadron will reactivate in 2026, equipped with the CH-53K King Stallion.

== Unit awards ==
A unit citation or commendation is an award bestowed upon an organization for the action cited. Members of the unit who participated in said actions are allowed to wear on their uniforms the awarded unit citation. Marine Heavy Helicopter Squadron 769 has been presented with the following awards:

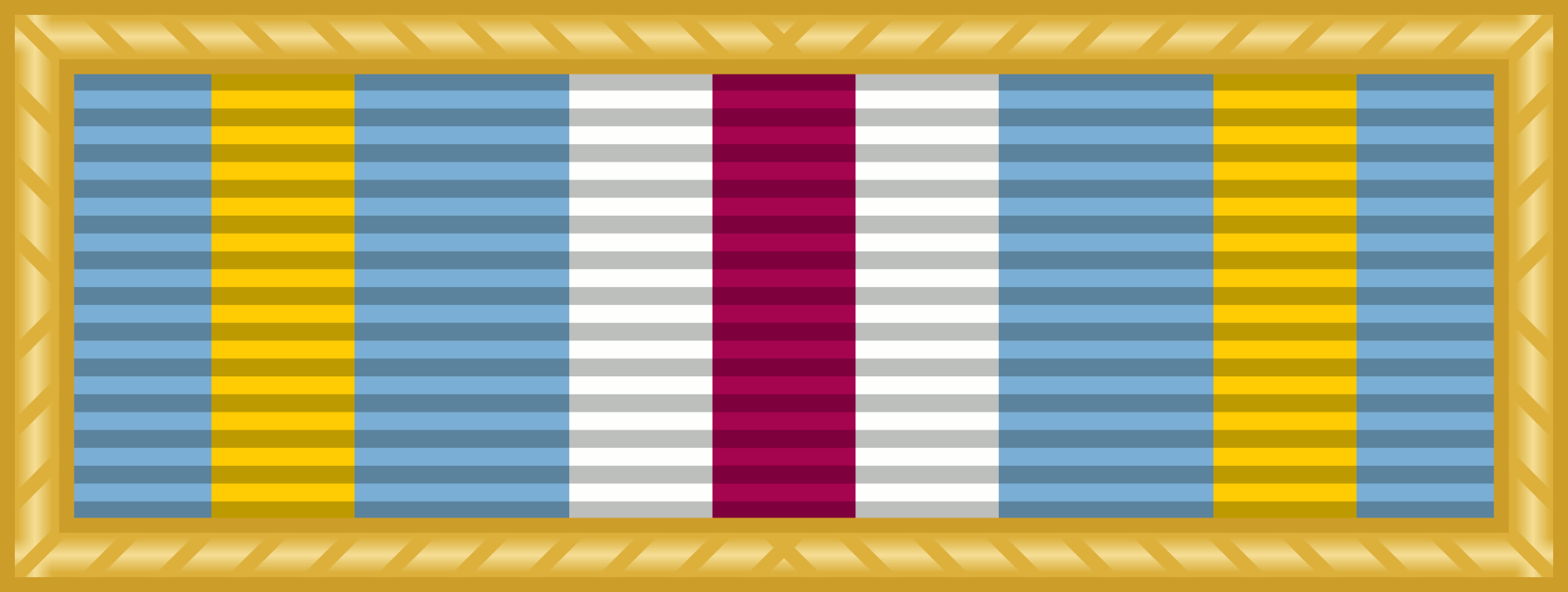

Joint Meritorious Unit Award

Meritorious Unit Commendation with one bronze service star

National Defense Service Medal with one bronze service star

Southwest Asia Service Medal

Global War on Terrorism Expeditionary Medal

== Notable former members ==
- Sarah Deal

== See also ==
- United States Marine Corps Aviation
- Organization of the United States Marine Corps
- List of active United States Marine Corps aircraft squadrons
- List of decommissioned United States Marine Corps aircraft squadrons

== Videos ==
- HMH-769 Combat Operations in Afghanistan
- Sikorsky CH-53E
