= Unreleased Halo games =

Video game series and media franchise

Halo franchise logo

Halo is a video game series and media franchise created by Bungie and operated by Halo Studios. Since the series began in 2001, there have been several unreleased games. Bungie owned the Halo brand from 2001 to 2010. During this period, Bungie partnered with filmmaker Peter Jackson to produce Halo Chronicles, a narrative-driven episodic game about a human character who slowly merges with alien technology. The Halo film Jackson was producing lost funding in October 2006, and shortly afterward Halo Chronicles was canceled. A Halo massively multiplayer online game was in development by Ensemble Studios, but publisher Microsoft Game Studios canceled the project in 2007 as Ensemble had not received approval to work on such a game. A Nintendo DS Halo game demo was showcased by IGN co-founder Matt Casamassina in 2007, and although some journalists have questioned the game's authenticity, former n-Space developers assert the project's existence, and claim Nintendo stopped development despite Microsoft's approval.

In 2011, Halo Studios—then known as 343 Industries—took ownership of the series. n-Space was brought on to develop a Halo game involving Mega Bloks, a construction set toy. The exact reason for the cancellation in 2013 is unknown, although journalists have speculated Microsoft was concerned that an Xbox 360 exclusive game would have limited appeal. Halo Online was a free-to-play Microsoft Windows multiplayer game exclusive to Russia. Although it did see an early access release, it did not receive an official release before its cancelation in 2016. The most recent known unreleased Halo game was a battle royale game mode for Halo Infinite. Reports indicate that developer Certain Affinity lacked the resources needed to compete with Fortnite Battle Royale and that the game engine was troublesome to work with. Coupled with mass layoffs at 343 in 2023, the game mode was canceled that same year.

== Bungie era (2001–2010) ==
=== Halo Chronicles ===
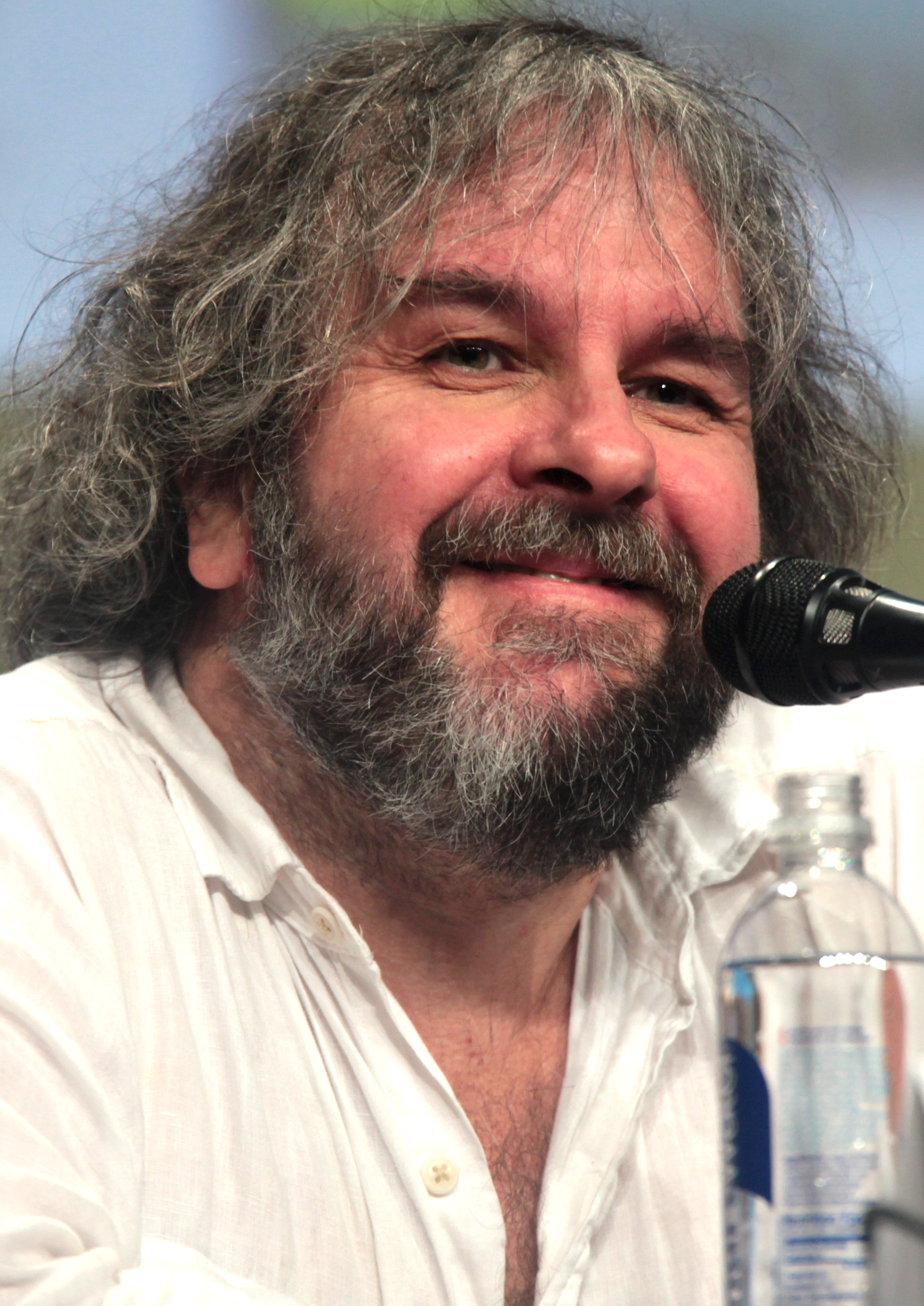
The development of Halo Chronicles would have been handled primarily by Peter Jackson's game studio Wingnut Interactive.

Halo Chronicles was intended to be a narrative-driven episodic game about a human character who slowly merges with alien technology. By the end of the story, the character would have been completely transformed into a Promethean, an alien race that would eventually be introduced in Halo 4. Bungie partnered with filmmaker Peter Jackson to produce Halo Chronicles, and development would have been handled primarily by Jackson's recently formed game studio Wingnut Interactive. Jackson was interested in the narrative capabilities of video games, and when Halo Chronicles was announced at the 2006 X trade show, he described it as "not quite a game, not quite a film ... Instead of making a film, we [will] make a form of entertainment that you can watch and enjoy like you would a film."

The origins of Halo Chronicles date to 2005, when Jackson first visited Bungie. At the time, Bungie was busy with the development of Halo 3 and preliminary work on Halo 4, and as a result, the only developers that routinely communicated with Jackson and Wingnut were Joseph Staten and Paul Bertone. Staten pitched a story that revolved around the premise "be the bullet". Bertone remarked, "We wanted to take the player on this emotional and gameplay journey from just being human to being a modified human. Not modified in the sense that you just put on power armor, but where there's biological shit actually happening to you." At one point in the story, the player would end up in orbit and destroy alien spacecraft by turning themselves into a missile. Gameplay would have differed significantly from mainline Halo games, as it would have focused on melee combat instead of gunfights. According to Bertone, the player could only deal damage with a powerful melee attack. The player was given access to weapons that would push enemies away and stun them. Additionally, they could double jump and dash midair. Due to the weaker main character, Bertone and developer Damian Isla reworked the enemy artificial intelligence (AI) so that the player would only deal with a few enemies at a time as opposed to an entire group. Isla called this system "kung-fu", and incorporated the system into Halo 3: ODST.

In October 2006, the Halo film that Jackson was producing was indefinitely postponed when 20th Century Fox and Universal Pictures dropped out of the project. Staten noted that although Halo Chronicles was not immediately affected by the postponement of the Halo film, it was understood the game would likely follow the same fate. Bungie and Wingnut were unable to coalesce their ideas for the game, and Halo Chronicles was abandoned without an official announcement. Bertone noted that although gameplay prototypes were developed, he was unable to design any levels since the story had yet to be finalized. In 2009 Microsoft effectively confirmed the cancelation of the game, when they stated that the game's developers had been moved onto other projects like Halo 3: ODST, Halo: Reach, and Halo Legends.

=== Halo MMO ===
A Halo massively multiplayer online game (MMO) was in development by Ensemble Studios until its cancelation in 2007. Little is known about what the gameplay or plot would have entailed. The game would have been set 100,000 years before the events of the franchise, and according to developer Dave Pottinger, the Covenant would have been fractured. Gameplay would have been more action-oriented than typical MMO's, and Pottinger compared it to real-time strategy (RTS) games. It would have featured a cover system similar to Star Wars: The Old Republic, and public quests that players could join as long as they were in the correct area. Leaked screenshots of the user interface drew comparisons to World of Warcraft, which Pottinger confirmed as an inspiration. In general, Pottinger noted Ensemble wanted the art direction to feel distinctly stylized when compared to mainline Halo games.

The Halo MMO began life as an unrelated MMO project called Titan. In a 2009 Gamasutra article, author N. Evan Van Zelfden claims designer Ian Fischer proposed the idea of a sci-fi MMO in 1998, soon after the release of Ultima Online. Fischer's proposal was greenlit, and the project was codenamed Titan. In 2017 game journalist Jason Schreier gave a different explanation as to the game's origins, and asserts that development began in the summer of 2004 when Ensemble chief executive officer Tony Goodman wanted to make an MMO similar to the upcoming World of Warcraft. By the end of the summer, Ensemble had greenlit three new projects, one of which was Titan, another was a role-playing game in the vein of Diablo, and the third was Phoenix, which would eventually become Halo Wars.

Many of the Ensemble developers wanted to work on Titan, as they disliked the idea of working on the RTS game Halo Wars after exclusively working on RTS games for several years. Schreier notes that although Ensemble's publisher Microsoft Game Studios had yet to formally approve Titan, company leadership decided to rebrand the game as a Halo MMO. According to Pottinger, "We realized that Microsoft wouldn't plunk that kind of money down on an unproven IP ... The idea to use the Halo IP was created as a way to get the game made. So, yeah, we didn't exactly ask permission, though they knew. We knew it was going to be a risky choice." For years, Microsoft was aware of the MMO's existence, but still had not formally approved development, and reports differ as to the publisher's knowledge of how big the project actually was. Developer Colt McAnlis remarked, "I remember there were some key meetings I was in where people were like, 'We didn't know you guys were putting resources on this. We thought these resources were over [on Halo Wars].'"

By 2007, the team working on Halo Wars was severely understaffed and those involved found the gameplay unfun. Coupled with an estimated budget of $90 million for the still unapproved game, Microsoft forced Ensemble to stop work on the Halo MMO and move the team onto Halo Wars. After the release of Halo Wars in 2009, Microsoft closed Ensemble, which Schreier believes was likely due to the company's decision to prioritize years of resources into a large game without publisher approval. Software engineer Dusty Monk also noted that Microsoft wanted to focus on the Xbox 360 and Xbox Live Arcade, and shifted focus away from computer games such as the Halo MMO.

=== Nintendo DS game ===
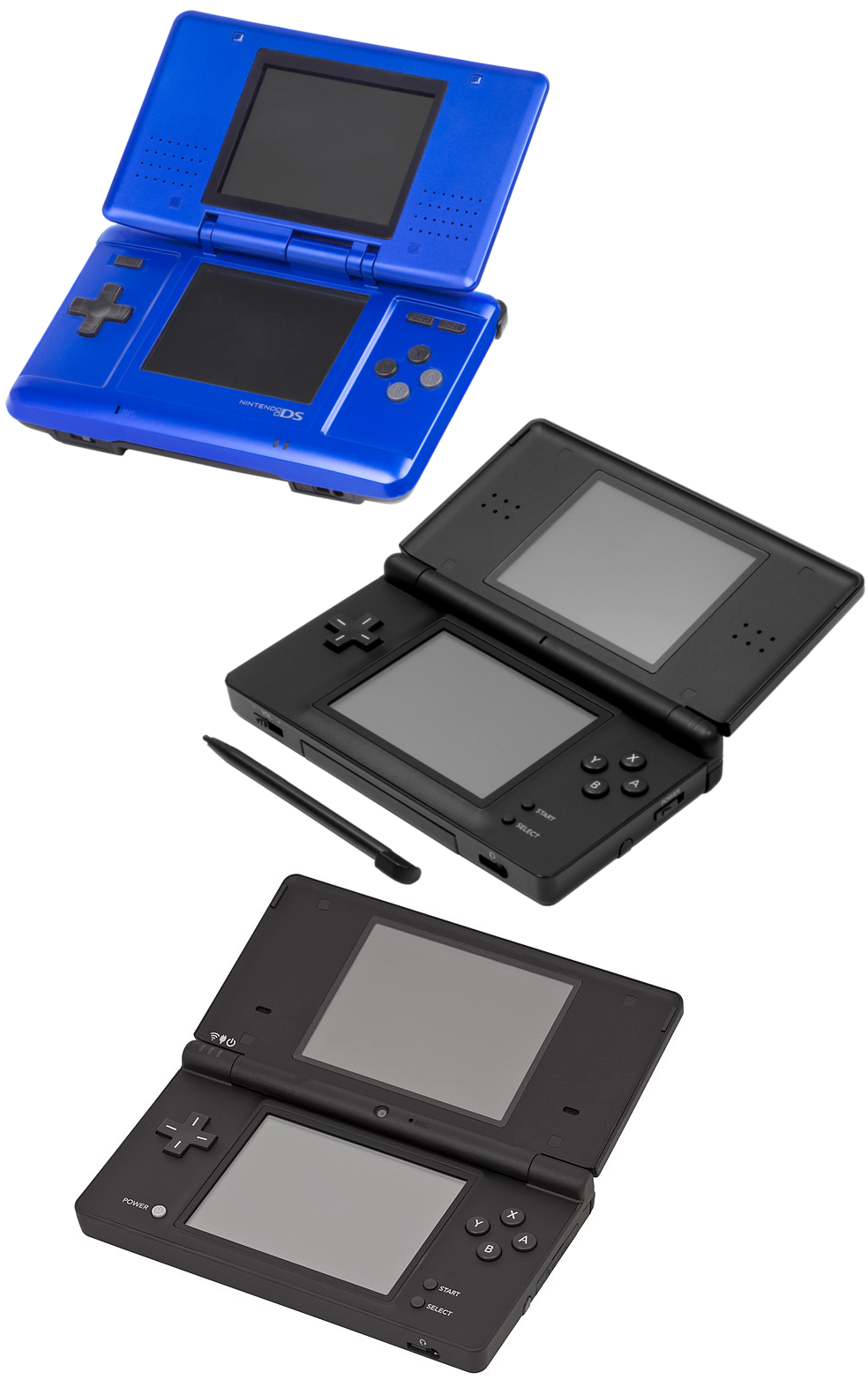
The various models of the Nintendo DS

In 2007, IGN co-founder Matt Casamassina wrote a blog post about a Halo game in development by n-Space for the Nintendo DS. Casamassina claimed to have played the game, and later uploaded a video to IGN's YouTube channel showcasing footage of a multiplayer match between him and IGN associate editor Mark Bozon. The game's existence was called into question by journalists, who speculated the footage was either completely fabricated or instead taken from a modded version of GoldenEye: Rogue Agent. When asked about the game's existence, Bungie developers Brian Gerard and Frank O'Connor stated that although studios would occasionally pitch Nintendo DS Halo games to Microsoft, no pitch had ever been approved.

For many years, the Nintendo DS Halo game was considered either fake or lost, as Casamassina did not keep a copy of the demo he was provided. In March 2025, the YouTube channel "Did You Know Gaming?" uploaded a video in which several n-Space developers were interviewed about the game, to which they asserted its existence. Visual effects James J. Inziello stated Microsoft had in fact greenlit production on the game, but Nintendo halted the project before development progressed past the prototype phase. Inziello believed Nintendo was dissatisfied with n-Space after the troubled development of the 2005 game Geist.

== 343 Industries/Halo Studios era (2011–present) ==
=== Halo Mega Bloks ===
Halo Mega Bloks would have revolved around the Halo line of Mega Bloks, a construction set toy owned by the Canadian company Mega Brands. Several journalists compared the gameplay to Lego games, as it featured a third-person perspective, toy brick renditions of Halo weapons and enemies, the ability to create structures with the bricks while in combat, and a general family friendly tone. Notable game mechanics would have included customizable vehicles, a cooperative mode, and a survival mode.

Development likely began in 2013 by the company n-Space, who was mostly known for porting games to the Nintendo DS and Wii. It went by the codename Haggar and ran on Unreal Engine 3. The exact reason for the cancellation is unknown, although Robert Purchese of Eurogamer speculates it may have been due to unfortunate timing. Halo Mega Bloks was developed as an Xbox 360 exclusive title, and 2013 saw the release of the Xbox One. Purchese believes Microsoft was concerned that an Xbox 360 exclusive game would have limited appeal. The existence of the game was not publicly known until 2017, when the YouTube channel "PtoPOnline" uploaded footage of the unfinished prototype. Head of 343 Industries Bonnie Ross later released a statement about the game, and noted, "Haggar had a lot of fun ideas and invention behind it, but ultimately didn't progress beyond the early prototyping levels that are shown in the recent video. This is just one example of several similar projects we have evaluated throughout the years – a process that we continue exploring on an ongoing basis."

=== Halo Online ===
Halo Online was a free-to-play Microsoft Windows multiplayer game exclusive to Russia. Set after the events of Halo 3, the premise of Halo Online revolved around a secret space installation where soldiers could train and test technology. The game featured multiplayer maps from Halo 3 as well as several new maps, and ran on a modified version of the Halo 3 engine. Halo Online was developed by Saber Interactive, who had previously worked on other games in the franchise such as Halo: Combat Evolved Anniversary and Halo: The Master Chief Collection.

Halo Online was announced in March 2015. Brian Albert of IGN noted that despite the strange circumstances surrounding the game, it was not uncommon for large franchises to release multiplayer games exclusively in non-Western countries, such as the Chinese exclusive Call of Duty Online. Sabre hosted closed alpha and beta tests in 2015, but disabled the servers by the end of the year to update the game. In August 2016, a developer who went by the online alias "Fogeyman" stated that Microsoft had canceled the game, and claimed the company had "failed to make decisions on the future of the project". When asked about the cancelation of Halo Online, a Microsoft spokesperson said, "The Halo Online closed beta test represented a great opportunity for us to learn how to deliver a great Halo experience to PC players ... We look forward to applying the beta learnings to future Halo PC experiences."

Before the cancellation of Halo Online, modders were able to bypass the regional lockout and released a mod known as ElDewrito, which allowed players outside of Russia to play the game. At its peak, the mod had over 12,000 concurrent players. Microsoft issued a DMCA takedowns in response, and in 2018 modders stopped active development on ElDewrito. In an online statement, 343 Industries noted that although they were impressed by the fandom's support of the mod, it was ultimately using Microsoft-owned assets that were never legally released. 343 brought on the ElDewrito modders as collaborators for the Windows release of Halo: The Master Chief Collection in 2019.

=== Halo Infinite battle royale game mode ===
According to developer Mike Clopper, the studio Certain Affinity was developing a battle royale mode as downloadable content for the 2021 game Halo Infinite. The gameplay would have been similar to other battle royale games such as Fortnite Battle Royale. Leaked source code indicated that it could have been played solo or as part of a team. It would have taken place on fragments of a megastructure known as the Zeta Halo ring, and players could fast travel to different biomes on each fragment. Other mechanics included in-game objectives that needed to be completed in order to unlock new equipment, and vehicles would be delivered by dropships during the match. The game mode would have been tied to the Halo Infinite's narrative.

Known internally by the codename Project Tatanka and later Project Ekhert, Microsoft privately canceled the game mode in 2023. Reports indicate that the studio lacked the resources needed to compete with Fortnite Battle Royale and that the game engine was troublesome to work with. Additionally, 343 Industries dealt with mass layoffs in 2023 as a result of Halo Infinite's troubled development, and a report from Bloomberg News stated that Project Tatanka would likely "evolve in different directions". Certain Affinity and Microsoft never publicly confirmed the existence of the game mode, but in October 2024, Clopper updated his LinkedIn resume by writing, "I led a large team of designers working on a cancelled Battle Royale mode for Halo. I believe this product could have been a game changer for the franchise. We loved playing it and working on it, was a fantastic experience in spite of its cancelation.
