= Titanium (disambiguation) =

Titanium is a chemical element with symbol Ti and atomic number 22.

Titanium may also refer to:

== The chemical element titanium ==
- Titanium (native), a natural occurrence of titanium
- Isotopes of titanium
- Titanium alloy
- Titanium dioxide, the naturally occurring oxide of titanium, also known as titanium white

== Music ==
- Titanium (band), a New Zealand boy-band formed in 2012
- "Titanium" (David Guetta song), a 2011 song by David Guetta featuring Sia
- "Titanium" (Davido song), 2025
- Tony Titanium (American rapper and producer), a stage name of Anthony Ian Berkeley, better known as Too Poetic, also known as Grym Reaper

== Other uses ==
- Appcelerator Titanium, a platform for developing mobile and desktop software
- Titanium (malware), advanced backdoor malware
- Titanium Metals, a manufacturer of titanium-based products
- Titanium, a Crayola color, See List of Crayola crayon colors#Metallic Crayons (Canada)

== See also ==
- Tytanium, 2009 album by Sonny Seeza
- Itanium, Intel microprocessor architecture
- Ti (disambiguation)
- Titan (disambiguation)
- Thaitanium, Thai-American hip hop music group
