= Sinking of the Titanic (disambiguation) =

The sinking of the Titanic was a maritime disaster in 1912.

Sinking of the Titanic may also refer to:

- The Sinking of the Titanic (Bryars), 1972 minimalist composition
- The Sinking of the Titanic and Great Sea Disasters, 1912 book by Logan Marshall
- Der Untergang der Titanic, 1978 poem by Hans Magnus Enzensberger
  - Der Untergang der Titanic, 1979 operatic adaptation by Wilhelm Dieter Siebert

== See also ==
- Titanic in popular culture
