= Titanic: The Board Game =

1998 board game

Box cover of the first edition, 1998

Titanic: The Board Game is a board game published by Universal Games in 1998 that is based on the 1912 sinking of the Titanic. The game was commercially popular, and a reprint was released in 2012. However, critical reviews towards its gameplay and strategy were mixed.

== Gameplay ==
=== Object of the game ===
The six players take the role of six fictitious passengers aboard the RMS Titanic. Moving around the Board, players must collect several items in order to move up to the First Class areas towards the lifeboats. Once all of these have been acquired, players can move to other areas of the Board and head to the Lifeboats. The first to reach the Lifeboats is the winner. The remaining survivor with the most money may be the second-place winner. Though the game continues until only one player has yet to reach their life boat; that player goes down with the ship.

=== Areas on the board ===
The board has a layout similar to the RMS Titanic. In the Second Class areas (where the game starts), there are several rooms for players to enter:

- Player's Suite
- Purser's Office
- Passport Office
- Safety Office
- Steerage (Players who enter Steerage must pay $200 to return to 2nd Class)
- Jail (Players in Jail lose a turn)

The Wireless Room cannot be accessed by Players, but is used for Telegram Cards, that instruct Players on where to go, whom to pay or who pays you money.

Once in 1st Class, players are paid $200, and must pass through a route towards the lifeboats:

- The Gymnasium
- The First Class Lounge
- The Captain's Quarters
- The Smoking Room
- The Dining Room
- The Bridge
- The Poop Deck

After this, players may enter the lifeboats and the game is over.

=== Other playing cards ===
- Gossip Cards - These cards act similarly to the Telegram cards, but in the form of passenger conversations. Payment, for example, is written in the form of bribery, or instructions on movement can be seen as instructing a Player to follow another more suspicious character.
- Bellhops - The Bellhop tokens can be used to evade Steerage or moving to an undesirable place. However, they cannot be used as an exchange for money. Bellhop tokens are given free of charge to players whenever they land on a Bellhop space on the Board or are gifted one via telegram.

== Publication history ==
Titanic: The Board Game was designed by Sandra Gentry and Valen Brost, and was released by Universal Games in 1998 in North America, the UK, and France (where it was titled Titanic: le jeu.)

To coincide with the centennial of the sinking, Universal released Titanic: The Board Game Centennial Edition in late 2012.

== Reception ==
The game was very successful in 1998, selling 300,000 units, and becoming one of the top five selling games at Toys "R" Us that year.

Not everyone was enamored of the game. Tom Snider, writing for the Mansfield News Journal, praised the game's artwork and presentation, but was uncomfortable with the concept of turning a tragedy into a game, finding "the subject matter and the game's object unsettling [...] I felt like I was belittling the memories of those who suffered during this disaster." He described the gameplay as "a bizarre mix of the stagnant meeting the complex."

Zillions gave the game an overall positive review, praising the game's variety and suspenseful, surprising gameplay, although criticizing the lengthy playing time and over-reliance on luck.
