= Titan (Space World) =

Former roller coaster at Space World, Japan

Titan V
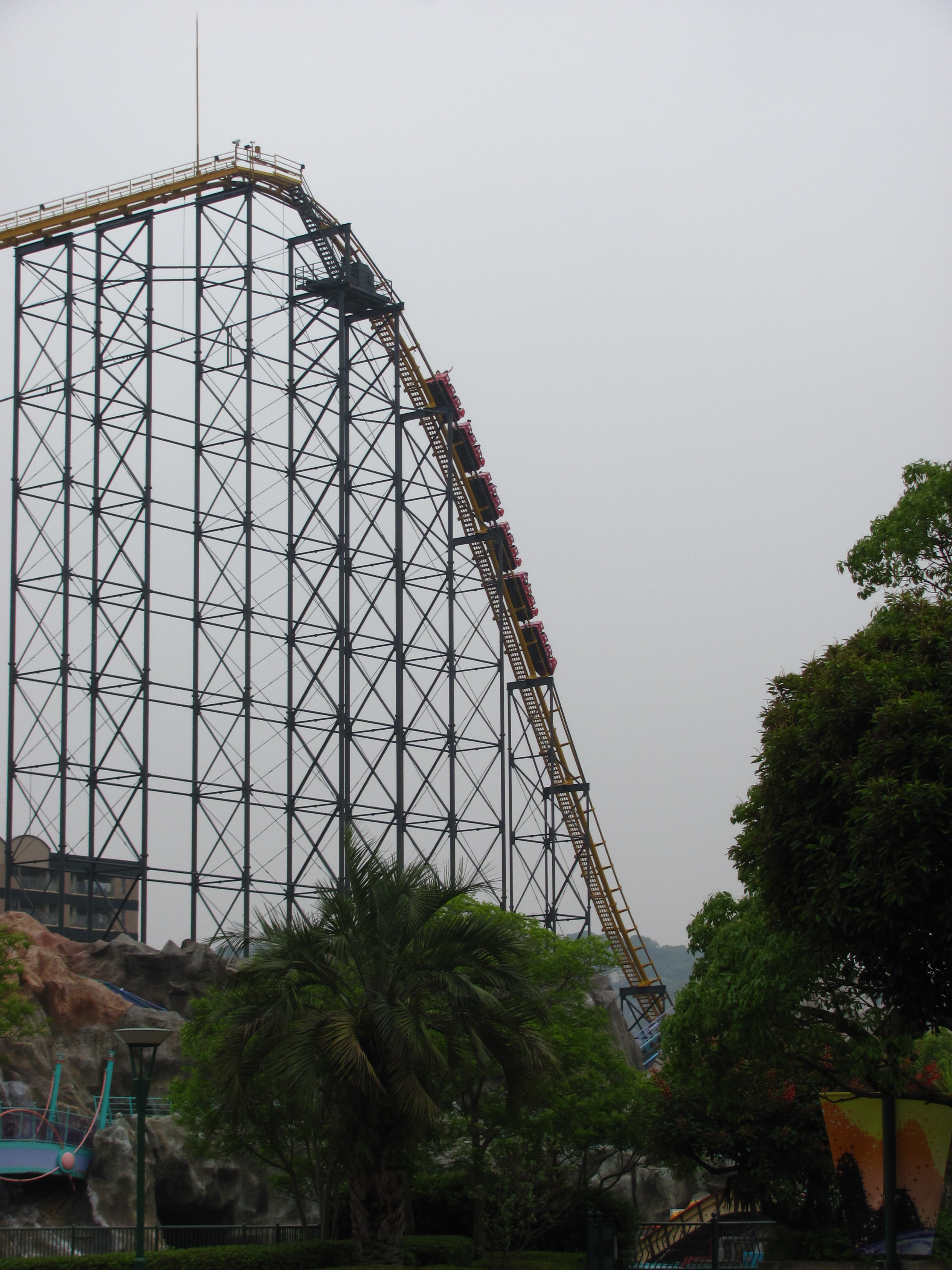

Space World
- Location: Space World
- Coordinates: 33°52′29″N 130°48′48″E
- Status: Removed
- Opening date: 5 March 1994
- Closing date: 31 December 2017

General statistics
- Type: Steel
- Manufacturer: Arrow Dynamics
- Designer: Werner Stengel
- Model: Hypercoaster
- Lift/launch system: chain lift hill
- Height: 166 ft (51 m)
- Drop: 178 ft (54 m)
- Length: 5,019 ft (1,530 m)
- Speed: 71.5 mph (115.1 km/h)
- Inversions: 0
- Duration: 2:25
- Max vertical angle: 60°
- Capacity: 1500 riders per hour
- G-force: 3.7
- Height restriction: 48 in (122 cm)
- Titan V at RCDB

Titan V was a steel roller coaster at Space World in Yahata Higashi ward, Kitakyushu, Japan. It opened in 1994. In 2015 the coaster was revamped and renamed Titan MAX. The coaster closed when Space World closed in 2017.
