= Titan Advisors =

Titan Advisors, LLC
- Industry: Finance
- Founded: 1992
- Headquarters: Stamford, Connecticut, United States
- Key people: George Fox (founder & president)
- Products: Financial services
- Website: titanadvisors.com

Titan Advisors is an American asset management firm.

== History ==
The firm was founded in 1992 by George Fox. In 2015 Titan Advisors merged with Saguenay Strathmore Capital. It is headquartered in Stamford, Connecticut.

In 2016, it had approximately US$5 billion under management.
