= Titan Stadium =

Titan Stadium may refer to:

- Titan Stadium (Cal State Fullerton) at the California State University, Fullerton
- Titan Stadium (UW–Oshkosh), at the University of Wisconsin–Oskhosh
- Nissan Stadium, the home of the Tennessee Titans American football team
- Alternate name of University of Detroit Stadium, a former football stadium in Detroit
