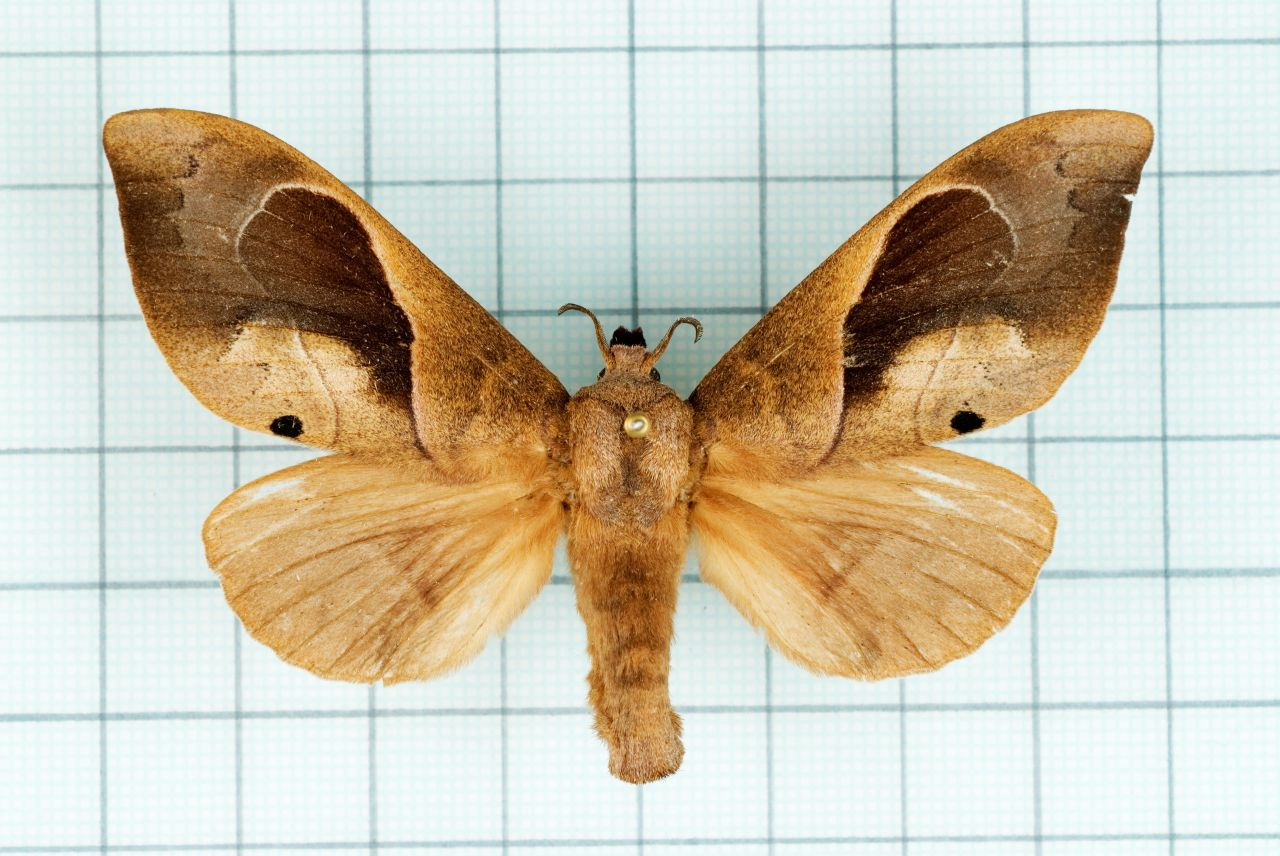
- Paralebeda femorata mirabilis

Scientific classification
- Domain: Eukaryota
- Kingdom: Animalia
- Phylum: Arthropoda
- Class: Insecta
- Order: Lepidoptera
- Family: Lasiocampidae
- Genus: Paralebeda
- Species: P. femorata

Binomial name
- Paralebeda femorata (Ménétriés, 1858)

Synonyms
- Lasiocampa femorata Ménétriés, 1858

= Paralebeda femorata =

Species of moth

Paralebeda femorata is a moth of the family Lasiocampidae. It is found from the Russian Far East, eastern Mongolia, Korea and north-eastern China over eastern and central China and Taiwan to Bhutan, Nepal, northern India, Pakistan and northern Vietnam.

The wingspan is 90–115 mm.

The larvae have been recorded feeding on Pithecellobium dulce, Quercus dentata and Quercus acutissima.

== Subspecies ==
- Paralebeda femorata femorata (Russian Far East)
- Paralebeda femorata karmata Zolotuhin, 1996 (Pakistan)
- Paralebeda femorata mirabilis Zolotuhin, 1996 (Taiwan)
- Paralebeda femorata titanica Zolotuhin & Witt, 2000 (Vietnam)
