= Titanic (American band) =

American heavy metal band

Titanic is an American Christian heavy metal band. They released three albums between 1996 and 2007, two of which on Retroactive Records, as well as a compilation album.

On their last album Full Steam Ahead (2007), Robert Sweet of Stryper played the drums on two tracks. Norway's Scream Magazine gave a good 4 out of 6 rating, recommending the album to fans of classical heavy metal owing to its "heavy-as-lead guitars, rhythmical riffs and powerful vocals". Individual tracks stood out, soliciting epithets like "majeestic" and "a monster of a tune". Powermetal.de commended the Las Vegas-based group for offering "traditional fare in its purest form, and at a remarkably high level". Despite the band's Christian leanings, they did apparently not "feel the need to bombard us with their religious pronouncements".

Full Steam Ahead was not well received by Rock Hard bestowing only 5 out of 10 points. In 2010, collectors' editions of Maiden Voyage (1996) and Screaming in Silence (2002) were released, garnering similar mediocre reviews from Powermetal.de. Among others, Titanic was called a "lame variant of old Savatage".

Christian website Angelic Warlord was positive throughout Titanic's career, issuing an 80/100 rating for Maiden Voyage, 75/100 for Screaming in Silence (collectors' edition, albeit only 65 for the original release) and 85/100 for Full Steam Ahead.

In 2007, Titanic also released a compilation album called Wreckage on Retroactive.

== External link ==
- Discogs
