= Camden Head, New South Wales =

Camden Head New South Wales
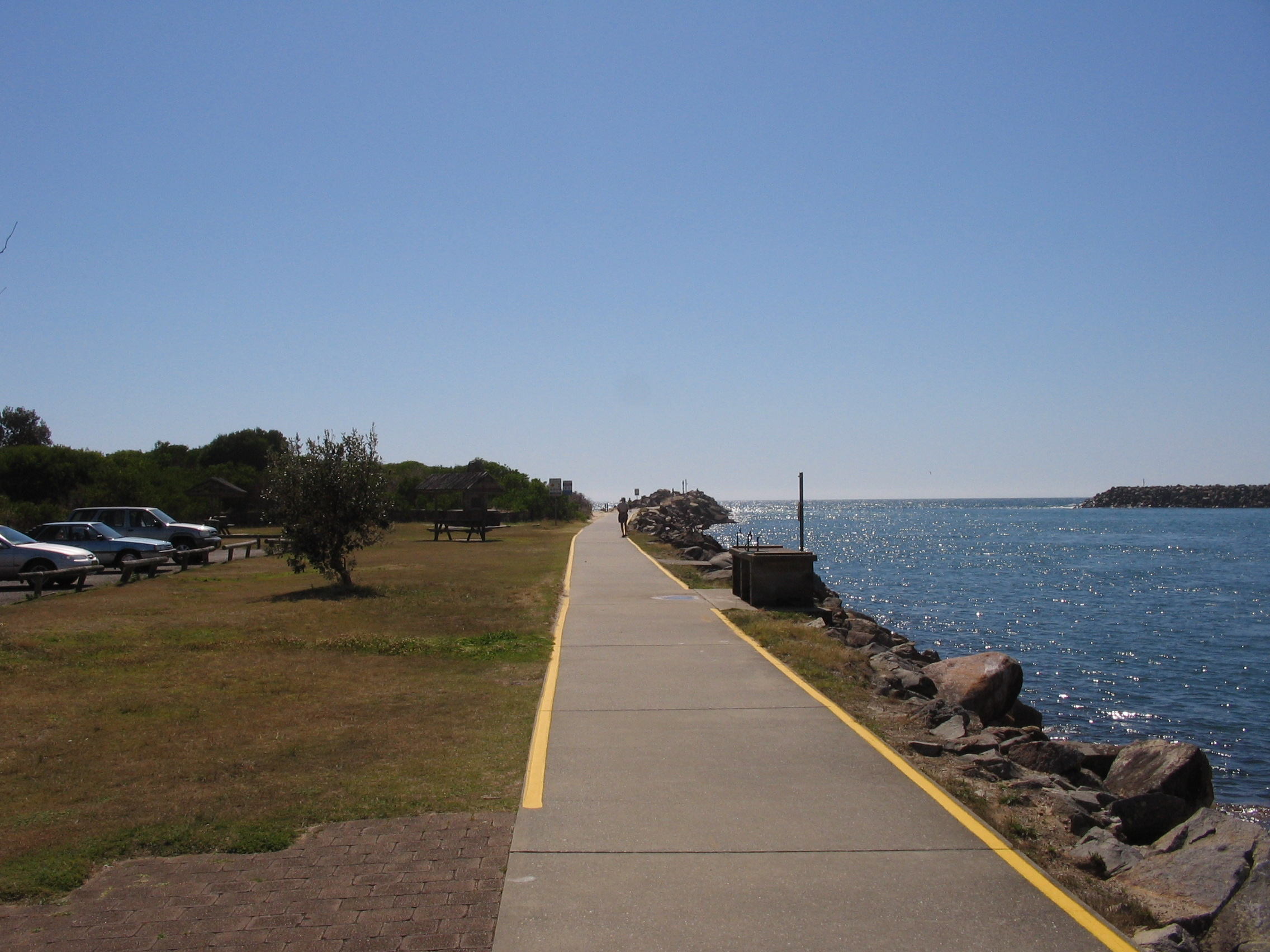

- Coordinates: 31°37′54″S 152°50′4″E
- Population: 152 (2016 census)
- Postcode(s): 2443
- Elevation: 1 m (3 ft)
- LGA(s): Port Macquarie-Hastings Council
- County: Macquarie
- State electorate(s): Port Macquarie
- Federal division(s): Lyne

Camden Head is a town in New South Wales, Australia. At the 2016 census, it had a population of 152.
