= Titania =

Titania may refer to:

== Astronomy ==
- Titania (moon), the largest moon of the planet Uranus
- 593 Titania, an asteroid

== Chemistry and mineralogy ==
- Titania, an alternate name for titanium dioxide

== Fiction ==
- Titania (A Midsummer Night's Dream), the Queen of the Fairies in William Shakespeare's A Midsummer Night's Dream
- Titania (DC Comics), a DC Comics character
- Titania (Marvel Comics), a Marvel Comics supervillain
- Titania (Grapplers) or Lascivious, a Marvel Comics supervillain
- Titania (Fire Emblem), a paladin in Fire Emblem: Path of Radiance
- Titania (Dungeons & Dragons), a fey deity in Dungeons & Dragons
- Titania (Gargoyles), a character in Gargoyles
- Titania, a fictional computer in Starship Titanic
- Titania or Asuna, a character in Sword Art Online
- Titania, a fictional demon in Shin Megami Tensei
- Titania, a fictional kingdom in Odin Sphere
- Titania or Erza Scarlet, a character in Fairy Tail
- Titania, a fictional planet in the Star Fox Series
- Titania, a fictional character in The Ancient Magus' Bride
- Queen Titania, recurring character in the French Tara Duncan book series
- SCP-6666, a fictional deity in the SCP Foundation

== Ships ==
- SS Titania (1912), a coaster in service 1939–1945
- HMS Titania, a Royal Navy submarine depot ship, 1915–1949
- USS Titania, a U.S. Navy Arcturus-class attack cargo ship commissioned in 1942
- Fairey Titania, a class of sailing yacht built by Fairey Marine Ltd
- Titania, a clipper operated by the Hudson's Bay Company from 1885 to 1893; see Hudson's Bay Company vessels

== Other uses ==
- Titania (ballet), an 1866 ballet choreographed by Marius Petipa to music by Cesare Pugni
- Titania Peak, a rock peak on Alexander Island, Antarctica
- "Titania", a poem by Gustaf Fröding
- "Titania", a song by Mando Diao
- Titania AS, a titanium mining company with a mine in Sokndal Municipality, Norway

== See also ==
- Titania's Palace, a miniature castle
- Tytania, Japanese sci-fi novel series written by Yoshiki Tanaka
- Tatiana
