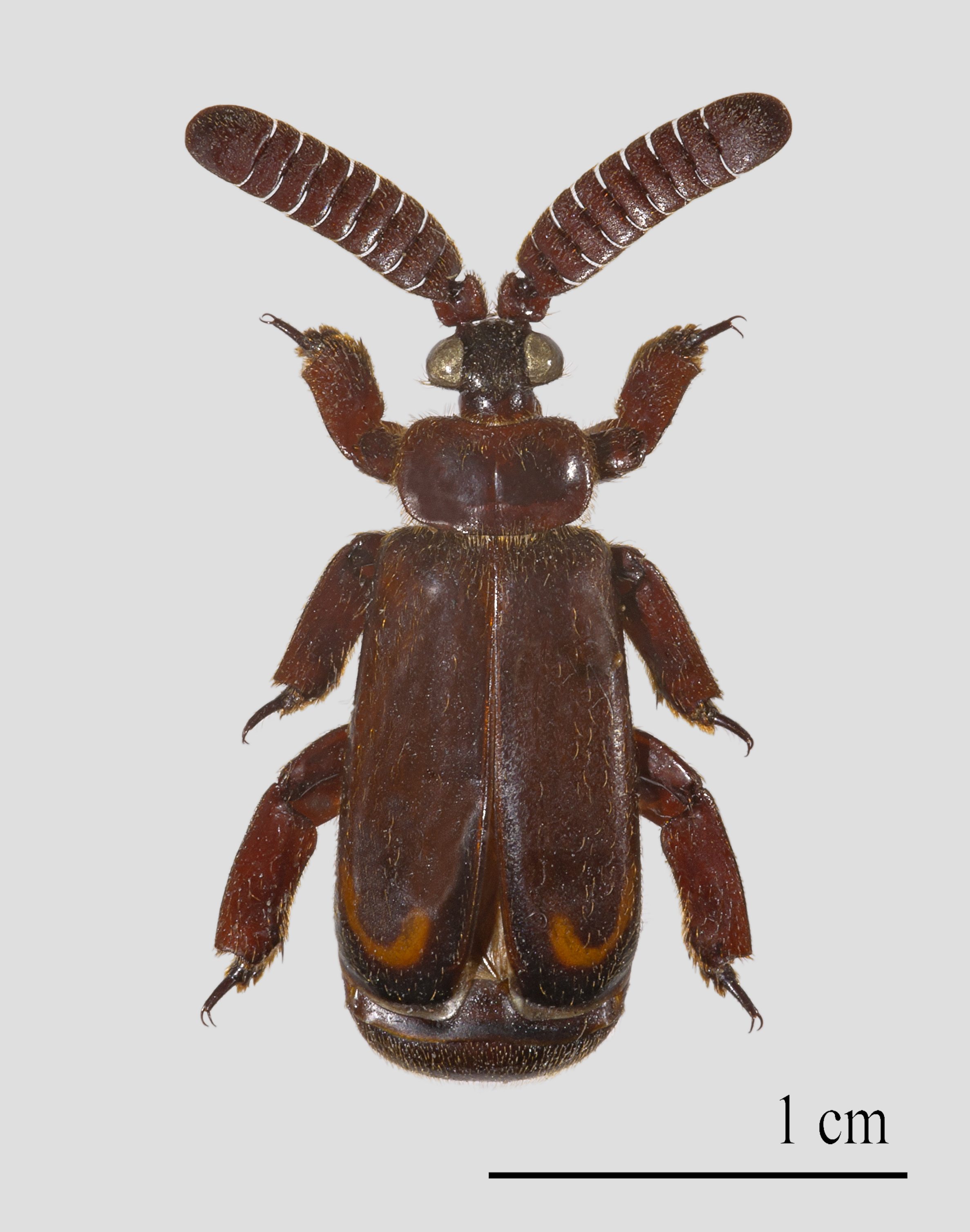
- Cerapterus pilipennis

Scientific classification
- Kingdom: Animalia
- Phylum: Arthropoda
- Class: Insecta
- Order: Coleoptera
- Suborder: Adephaga
- Family: Carabidae
- Subfamily: Paussinae
- Tribe: Paussini; Latreille, 1806

Subtribes
- Carabidomemnina Wasmann, 1928; Cerapterina Billberg, 1820; Heteropaussina Janssens, 1950; Homopterina Wasmann, 1920; Paussina Latreille, 1806; Pentaplatarthrina Jeannel, 1946; † Arthropteritina Luna de Carvalho, 1961; † Eopaussina Luna de Carvalho, 1951

= Paussini =

Tribe of beetles

Paussini is a tribe of ground beetles in the family Carabidae. There are more than 25 genera and 610 described species in Paussini. They are found mainly in Africa, southern Asia, and the Pacific, although the genus Homopterus is found in the Americas.

== Genera ==
These 26 genera belong to the tribe Paussini:

- Allorhopalus Nagel, 2017 (China and Indonesia)
- Arthropterus W.S.MacLeay, 1838 (Australia)
- Carabidomemnus Kolbe, 1924 (Africa)
- Cerapterus Swederus, 1788 (Africa)
- Ceratoderus Westwood, 1841 (South and East Asia)
- Eohomopterus Wasmann, 1919 (Ecuador, Brazil)
- Euplatyrhopalus Desneux, 1905 (Indomalaya, southeast Asia)
- Heteropaussus J.Thomson, 1860 (Africa, Indomalaya)
- Hexaplatarthrus Jeannel, 1955 (Madagascar)
- Homopterus Westwood, 1841 (Mexico, Central and South America)
- Lebioderus Westwood, 1838 (China, Southeast Asia, Oceania)
- Leleupaussus Luna de Carvalho, 1962 (South Africa)
- Megalopaussus Lea, 1906 (Australia)
- Melanospilus Westwood, 1847 (Indomalaya, Southeast Asia)
- Mesarthropterus Wasmann, 1926 (Ethiopia)
- Paussomorphus Raffray, 1885 (Africa)
- Paussus Linnaeus, 1775 (mainly Africa and southern Asia)
- Pentaplatarthrus Westwood, 1833 (Africa)
- Platyrhopalides Wasmann, 1918 (Bhutan, China, India)
- Platyrhopalopsis Desneux, 1905 (Indomalaya)
- Platyrhopalus Westwood, 1833 (Indomalaya and temperate Asia)
- Pterorhopalus Maruyama, 2011 (Indonesia and Malaysia)
- † Arthropterites Wasmann, 1926
- † Cerapterites Wasmann, 1926
- † Eopaussus Wasmann, 1926
- † Protocerapterus Wasmann, 1926
