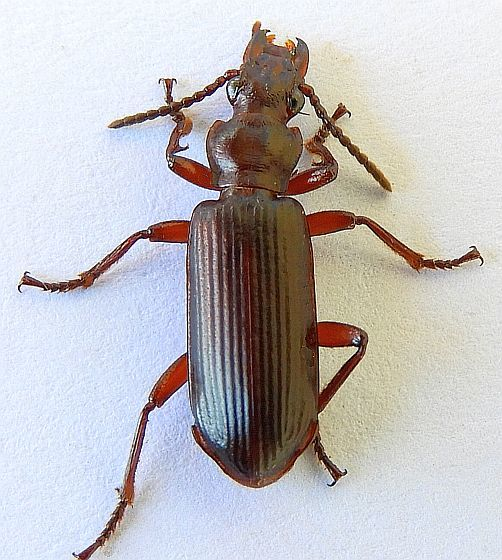
- Goniotropis parca, Arizona

Scientific classification
- Domain: Eukaryota
- Kingdom: Animalia
- Phylum: Arthropoda
- Class: Insecta
- Order: Coleoptera
- Suborder: Adephaga
- Family: Carabidae
- Subfamily: Paussinae
- Tribe: Ozaenini; Hope, 1838

Subtribes
- Microzaenina Deuve, 2019; Mystropomina G.Horn, 1881; Ozaenina Hope, 1838; Pseudozaenina Sloane, 1905

= Ozaenini =

Tribe of beetles

Ozaenini is a tribe of ground beetles in the family Carabidae. There are more than 20 genera and 230 described species in Ozaenini. They are found in North, Central, and South America. Most species inhabit tropical regions.

== Genera ==
These 24 genera belong to the tribe Ozaenini:

Subtribe Microzaenina Deuve, 2019
Microzaena Fairmaire, 1901
Subtribe Mystropomina G.Horn, 1881
Mystropomus Chaudoir, 1848
Subtribe Ozaenina Hope, 1838
Crepidozaena Deuve, 2001
Entomoantyx Ball & McCleve, 1990
Filicerozaena Deuve, 2001
Gibbozaena Deuve, 2001
Goniotropis G.R.Gray, 1831
Inflatozaena Deuve, 2001
Mimozaena Deuve, 2001
Ozaena Olivier, 1812
Pachyteles Perty, 1830
Physea Brullé, 1835
Physeomorpha Ogueta, 1963
Platycerozaena Bänninger, 1927
Proozaena Deuve, 2001
Serratozaena Deuve, 2001
Tachypeles Deuve, 2001
Tropopsis Solier, 1849
Subtribe Pseudozaenina Sloane, 1905
Anentmetus Andrewes, 1924
Dhanya Andrewes, 1919
Eustra Schmidt-Goebel, 1846
Itamus Schmidt-Goebel, 1846
Pseudozaena Laporte, 1834
Sphaerostylus Chaudoir, 1848
