= H. hastatus =

H. hastatus may refer to:

- Heliophanus hastatus, a jumping spider species found in South Africa
- Heteropaussus hastatus, a beetle species in the genus Heteropaussus (ant nest beetles)
- Hibiscus hastatus, a large shrub or tree species

== See also ==
- Hastatus (disambiguation)
