= Serratozaena =

Scientific classification
- Domain: Eukaryota
- Kingdom: Animalia
- Phylum: Arthropoda
- Class: Insecta
- Order: Coleoptera
- Suborder: Adephaga
- Family: Carabidae
- Subfamily: Paussinae
- Tribe: Ozaenini
- Subtribe: Ozaenina
- Genus: Serratozaena; Deuve, 2001
- Species: S. paraphysea

Binomial name
- Serratozaena paraphysea Deuve, 2001

Genus of beetles

Serratozaena paraphysea is a species of beetle in the family Carabidae, the only species in the genus Serratozaena.
