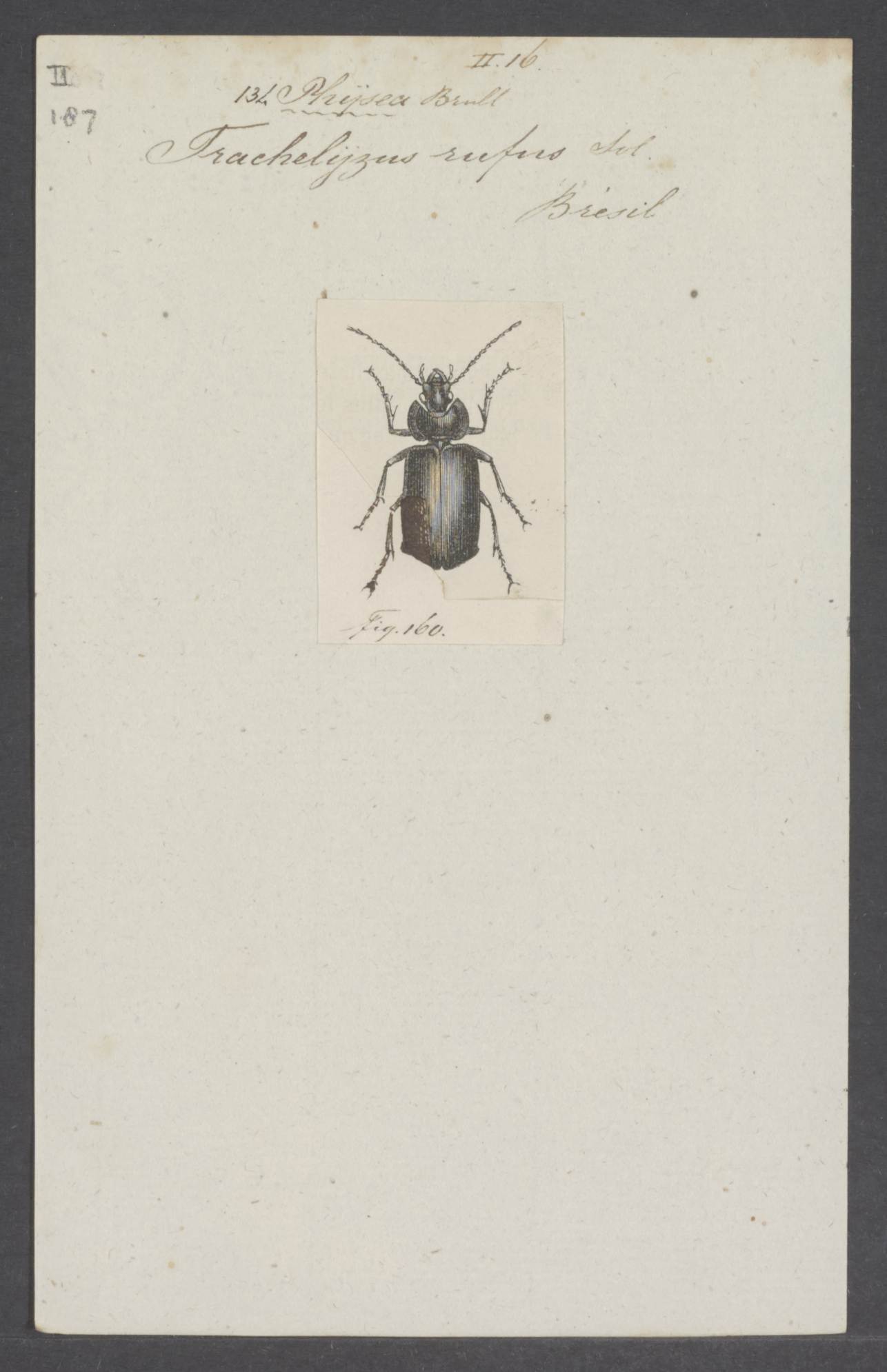
- Physea - Print - Iconographia Zoologica - Special Collections University of Amsterdam - UBAINV0274

Scientific classification
- Domain: Eukaryota
- Kingdom: Animalia
- Phylum: Arthropoda
- Class: Insecta
- Order: Coleoptera
- Suborder: Adephaga
- Family: Carabidae
- Subfamily: Paussinae
- Tribe: Ozaenini
- Genus: Physea; Brullé, 1835

= Physea =

Genus of beetles

Physea is a genus of beetles in the family Carabidae, containing the following species:

- Physea breyeri Ogueta, 1963
- Physea hirta Leconte, 1853
- Physea latipes Schaum, 1864
- Physea setosa Chaudoir, 1868
- Physea testudinea (Klug, 1834)
- Physea tomentosa Chaudoir, 1854
