= Platycerozaena =

Scientific classification
- Domain: Eukaryota
- Kingdom: Animalia
- Phylum: Arthropoda
- Class: Insecta
- Order: Coleoptera
- Suborder: Adephaga
- Family: Carabidae
- Subfamily: Paussinae
- Tribe: Ozaenini
- Subtribe: Ozaenina
- Genus: Platycerozaena; Banninger, 1927

Genus of beetles

Platycerozaena is a genus of beetles in the family Carabidae, containing the following species:

- Platycerozaena bordoni Ogueta, 1965
- Platycerozaena brevicornis Bates, 1874
- Platycerozaena magna (Bates, 1874)
- Platycerozaena panamensis (Banninger, 1949)
