= Platyrhopalides =

Scientific classification
- Domain: Eukaryota
- Kingdom: Animalia
- Phylum: Arthropoda
- Class: Insecta
- Order: Coleoptera
- Suborder: Adephaga
- Family: Carabidae
- Tribe: Paussini
- Subtribe: Paussina
- Genus: Platyrhopalides; Wasmann, 1918
- Species: P. badgleyi

Binomial name
- Platyrhopalides badgleyi (Fowler, 1912)

Synonyms
- Platyrhopalopsis badgleyi Fowler, 1912

Genus of flanged-bombardier beetles

Platyrhopalopsis is a genus of flanged-bombardier beetles in the family Carabidae. They are found within ant nests, in the Indo-Malayan region. This genus has a single species, Platyrhopalides badgleyi, formerly a member of the genus Platyrhopalopsis. It is found in China, Bhutan, and India.
