= Ozaena (beetle) =

Scientific classification
- Domain: Eukaryota
- Kingdom: Animalia
- Phylum: Arthropoda
- Class: Insecta
- Order: Coleoptera
- Suborder: Adephaga
- Family: Carabidae
- Subfamily: Paussinae
- Tribe: Ozaenini
- Subtribe: Ozaenina
- Genus: Ozaena; Olivier, 1812

Genus of beetles

Ozaena is a genus of in the beetle family Carabidae. There are about 14 described species in Ozaena, found in North, Central, and South America.

== Species ==
These 14 species belong to the genus Ozaena:

- Ozaena boucheri Deuve, 2001 (French Guiana, Ecuador, and Brazil)
- Ozaena convexa Bänninger, 1927 (Argentina, Venezuela, and Brazil)
- Ozaena dentipes Olivier, 1812 (French Guiana)
- Ozaena ecuadorica Bänninger, 1949 (Ecuador)
- Ozaena elevata Bänninger, 1956 (Paraguay and Brazil)
- Ozaena erwini Deuve, 2009
- Ozaena grossa Bänninger, 1927 (Argentina)
- Ozaena lemoulti Bänninger, 1932 (French Guiana, Brazil, United States, Costa Rica, and Nicaragua)
- Ozaena linearis Bänninger, 1927 (Argentina)
- Ozaena manu Ball & Shpeley, 1990 (Peru)
- Ozaena martinezi Ogueta, 1965
- Ozaena maxi Ball & Shpeley, 1990 (French Guiana)
- Ozaena moreti Deuve, 2001 (Ecuador)
- Ozaena thomasi Deuve, 2009 (Venezuela)
