= Physeomorpha =

Scientific classification
- Domain: Eukaryota
- Kingdom: Animalia
- Phylum: Arthropoda
- Class: Insecta
- Order: Coleoptera
- Suborder: Adephaga
- Family: Carabidae
- Subfamily: Paussinae
- Tribe: Ozaenini
- Subtribe: Ozaenina
- Genus: Physeomorpha; Ogueta, 1963
- Species: P. vianai

Binomial name
- Physeomorpha vianai Ogueta, 1963

Genus of beetles

Physeomorpha vianai is a species of beetle in the family Carabidae, the only species in the genus Physeomorpha.

Average size: 16 mm

Distribution: Argentina

Habitat: in the refuse piles of the leaf cutter ant, Atta sexdens.
