= Hexaplatarthrus =

Scientific classification
- Domain: Eukaryota
- Kingdom: Animalia
- Phylum: Arthropoda
- Class: Insecta
- Order: Coleoptera
- Suborder: Adephaga
- Family: Carabidae
- Subfamily: Paussinae
- Tribe: Paussini
- Subtribe: Pentaplatarthrina
- Genus: Hexaplatarthrus; Jeannel, 1955
- Species: H. vadoni

Binomial name
- Hexaplatarthrus vadoni Jeannel, 1955

Synonyms
- Hexaplatarthus

Genus of beetles

Hexaplatarthrus is a genus in the beetle family Carabidae. This genus has a single species, Hexaplatarthrus vadoni, found in Madagascar.
