= Dhanya =

Dhanya may refer to:

- Dhanya (film), a 1981 Indian Malayalam film
- Dhanya (beetle), a genus of beetles in the family Carabidae

== People ==
- Dhanya Balakrishna, Indian actress
- Dhanya Manikya (died 1515), Maharaja of Tripura from 1463
- Dhanya Mary Varghese (born 1985), Indian actress
