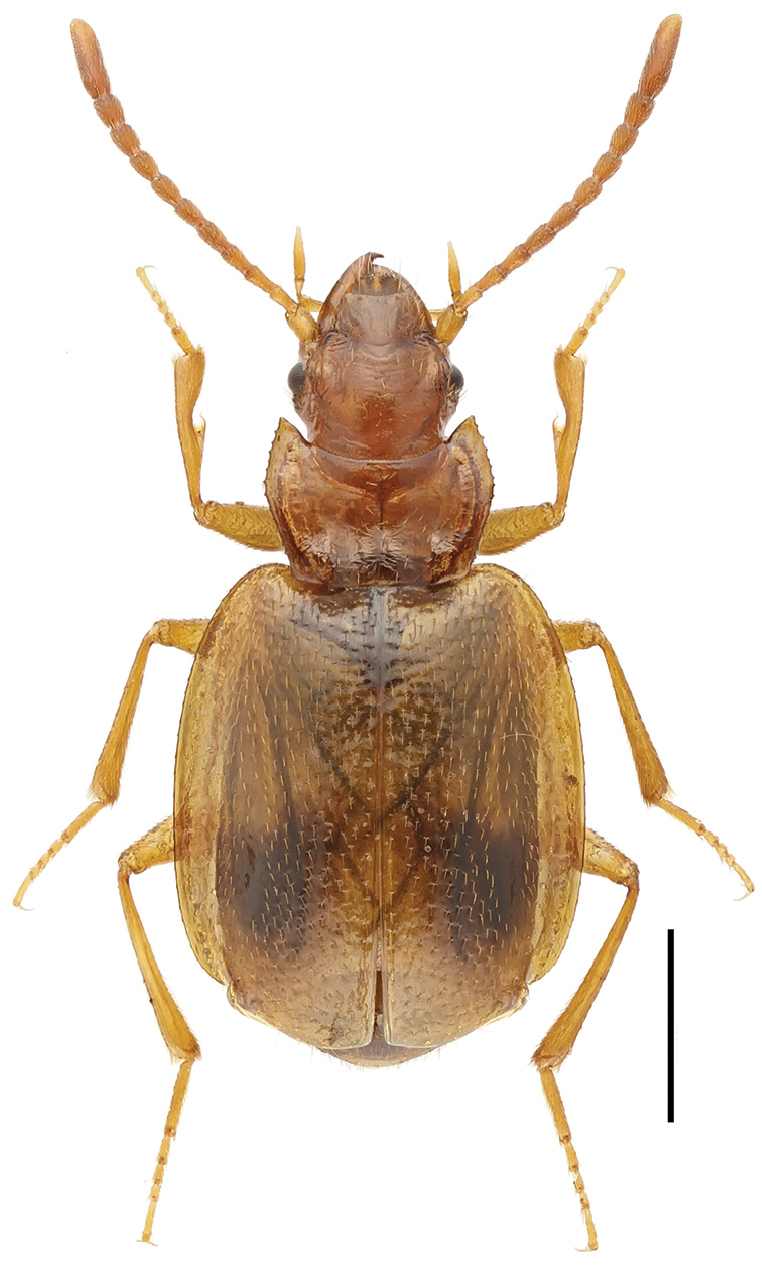
- Eustra chinensis

Scientific classification
- Domain: Eukaryota
- Kingdom: Animalia
- Phylum: Arthropoda
- Class: Insecta
- Order: Coleoptera
- Suborder: Adephaga
- Family: Carabidae
- Subfamily: Paussinae
- Tribe: Ozaenini
- Subtribe: Pseudozaenina
- Genus: Eustra; Schmidt-Gobel, 1846

= Eustra =

Genus of beetles

Eustra is a genus of beetles in the family Carabidae, containing the following species:

== Species ==
- Eustra andrewesiana Deuve, 2001
- Eustra bryanti Andrewes, 1919
- Eustra caeca Ueno, 1981
- Eustra ceylanica Deuve, 2001
- Eustra chinensis Banninger, 1949
- Eustra crucifera Ueno, 1964
- Eustra csikii Jedlicka, 1968
- Eustra deharvengi Deuve, 1986
- Eustra gomyi Deuve, 2001
- Eustra hammondi Deuve, 2001
- Eustra honchongensi Deuve, 1996
- Eustra indica Deuve, 2001
- Eustra japonica Bates, 1892
- Eustra lao Deuve, 2000
- Eustra lebretoni Deuve, 1987
- Eustra leclerci (Deuve, 1986)
- Eustra matanga Andrewes, 1919
- Eustra nageli Deuve, 2005
- Eustra plagiata Schmidt-Goebel, 1846
- Eustra pseudomatanga Deuve, 2001
- Eustra saripaensis Deuve, 2002
- Eustra shanghaiensis Song, Tang, Peng, 2018
- Eustra storki Deuve, 2001
- Eustra taiwanica Deuve, 2001
- Eustra troglophila Deuve, 1987
