= Tachypeles moretianus =

Scientific classification
- Kingdom: Animalia
- Phylum: Arthropoda
- Class: Insecta
- Order: Coleoptera
- Suborder: Adephaga
- Family: Carabidae
- Genus: Tachypeles
- Species: T. moretianus

Binomial name
- Tachypeles moretianus Deuve, 2004

Species of beetle

Tachypeles moretianus is a species of ground beetle in the genus Tachypeles of subfamily Paussinae. It was described by Deuve in 2004.
