= Filicerozaena =

Scientific classification
- Domain: Eukaryota
- Kingdom: Animalia
- Phylum: Arthropoda
- Class: Insecta
- Order: Coleoptera
- Suborder: Adephaga
- Family: Carabidae
- Subfamily: Paussinae
- Tribe: Ozaenini
- Subtribe: Ozaenina
- Genus: Filicerozaena; Deuve, 2001

Genus of beetles

Filicerozaena is a genus of beetles in the family Carabidae, containing the following species:

- Filicerozaena bravoi Deuve, 2004
- Filicerozaena callangaensis Deuve, 2005
- Filicerozaena chiriboga Deuve, 2004
- Filicerozaena cosangaensis Deuve, 2005
- Filicerozaena flava Deuve, 2004
- Filicerozaena leleuporum Deuve, 2005
- Filicerozaena losi Deuve, 2005
- Filicerozaena moreti Deuve, 2001
- Filicerozaena tagliantii Deuve, 2005
- Filicerozaena toureti Deuve, 2004
