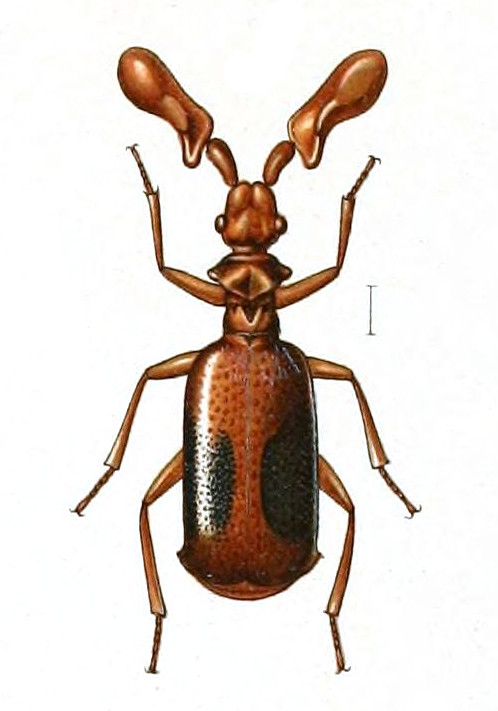
- Paussomorphus chevrolati

Scientific classification
- Kingdom: Animalia
- Phylum: Arthropoda
- Clade: Pancrustacea
- Class: Insecta
- Order: Coleoptera
- Suborder: Adephaga
- Family: Carabidae
- Subfamily: Paussinae
- Tribe: Paussini
- Subtribe: Paussina
- Genus: Paussomorphus; Raffray, 1885

= Paussomorphus =

Genus of beetles

Paussomorphus is a genus in the ground beetle family Carabidae. There are at least three described species in Paussomorphus, found in Africa.

== Species ==
These three species belong to the genus Paussomorphus:

- Paussomorphus chevrolatii (Westwood, 1852) (Ethiopia)
- Paussomorphus conradsianus (Reichensperger, 1938) (Uganda, Rwanda, Tanzania)
- Paussomorphus pauliani Reichensperger, 1951 (Ivory Coast and Cameroon)
