= Mystropomus =

Scientific classification
- Domain: Eukaryota
- Kingdom: Animalia
- Phylum: Arthropoda
- Class: Insecta
- Order: Coleoptera
- Suborder: Adephaga
- Family: Carabidae
- Subfamily: Paussinae
- Tribe: Ozaenini
- Subtribe: Ozaenina
- Genus: Mystropomus; Chaudoir, 1848

Genus of beetles

Mystropomus is a genus of beetles in the family Carabidae, containing the following species:

- Mystropomus regularis Banninger, 1940
- Mystropomus subcostatus Chaudoir, 1848
