= Sphaerostylus =

Scientific classification
- Domain: Eukaryota
- Kingdom: Animalia
- Phylum: Arthropoda
- Class: Insecta
- Order: Coleoptera
- Suborder: Adephaga
- Family: Carabidae
- Subfamily: Paussinae
- Tribe: Ozaenini
- Subtribe: Pseudozaenina
- Genus: Sphaerostylus; Chaudoir, 1848

Subgenera
- Afrozaena Jeannel, 1946; Ozaeniella Basilewsky, 1976; Sphaerostylus Chaudoir, 1848

Synonyms
- Afrozena Jeannel, 1946; Ozaniella Basilewsky, 1976

Genus of beetles

Sphaerostylus is a genus in the ground beetle family Carabidae. There are about 15 described species in Sphaerostylus, found in Africa.

== Species ==
These 15 species belong to the genus Sphaerostylus:

- Sphaerostylus acutangulus (Jeannel, 1946) (Madagascar)
- Sphaerostylus alluaudi (Jeannel, 1946) (Madagascar)
- Sphaerostylus bimaculatus Kolbe, 1895 (Tanzania)
- Sphaerostylus brevipennis (Jeannel, 1946) (Madagascar)
- Sphaerostylus ditomoides (Brullé, 1835) (Madagascar)
- Sphaerostylus feai (Basilewsky, 1949)
- Sphaerostylus goryi (Laporte, 1834) (Madagascar)
- Sphaerostylus guineensis Alluaud, 1925 (Africa)
- Sphaerostylus insularis (Basilewsky, 1949)
- Sphaerostylus levis (Jeannel, 1946) (Madagascar)
- Sphaerostylus longipennis Chaudoir, 1854 (Madagascar)
- Sphaerostylus luteus (Hope, 1842) (Africa)
- Sphaerostylus punctatostriatus Chaudoir, 1868 (Madagascar)
- Sphaerostylus striatus Chaudoir, 1868 (Madagascar)
- Sphaerostylus vadoni (Jeannel, 1946) (Madagascar)
