= Carabidomemnus =

Scientific classification
- Domain: Eukaryota
- Kingdom: Animalia
- Phylum: Arthropoda
- Class: Insecta
- Order: Coleoptera
- Suborder: Adephaga
- Family: Carabidae
- Subfamily: Paussinae
- Tribe: Paussini
- Subtribe: Carabidomemnina
- Genus: Carabidomemnus; Kolbe, 1924

Subgenera
- Carabidodoxus Kolbe, 1927; Carabidomemnus Kolbe, 1924; Carabidomimus Basilewsky, 1950

Genus of beetles

Carabidomemnus is a genus in the beetle family Carabidae. There are more than 20 described species in Carabidomemnus.

== Species ==
These 27 species belong to the genus Carabidomemnus:

- Carabidomemnus acutipennis Luna de Carvalho, 1975 (Angola)
- Carabidomemnus arthropteroides Luna de Carvalho, 1980 (Democratic Republic of the Congo)
- Carabidomemnus baenningeri (Kolbe, 1927) (Tanzania)
- Carabidomemnus besucheti Luna de Carvalho, 1977 (Cameroon)
- Carabidomemnus brachynoides Luna de Carvalho, 1959 (Somalia)
- Carabidomemnus decellei (Basilewsky, 1962) (Ivory Coast)
- Carabidomemnus endroedyfilius Luna de Carvalho, 1973 (Ghana)
- Carabidomemnus evansi (Reichensperger, 1933) (Democratic Republic of the Congo)
- Carabidomemnus feae (Gestro, 1902)
- Carabidomemnus fulvescens (Kolbe, 1927) (Cameroon)
- Carabidomemnus hammondi Luna de Carvalho, 1977 (Ghana)
- Carabidomemnus hargreavesi Reichensperger, 1930 (Uganda)
- Carabidomemnus ituriensis Reichensperger, 1933 (Democratic Republic of the Congo and Uganda)
- Carabidomemnus jeanfoxae Luna de Carvalho, 1967 (Cameroon)
- Carabidomemnus kirbii (Westwood, 1864) (Mozambique and South Africa)
- Carabidomemnus lecordieri Luna de Carvalho, 1978 (Ivory Coast)
- Carabidomemnus luluanus Basilewsky, 1950 (Democratic Republic of the Congo)
- Carabidomemnus lunacarvalhoi Nagel, 1983 (Gabon)
- Carabidomemnus methneri (Kolbe, 1927) (Tanzania)
- Carabidomemnus minutus (Kolbe, 1927) (Tanzania)
- Carabidomemnus mollicellus (C.A.Dohrn, 1880) (Africa)
- Carabidomemnus ozaenoides Luna de Carvalho, 1956 (Democratic Republic of the Congo)
- Carabidomemnus pallidus (Raffray, 1885) (Sudan, Eritrea, and Democratic Republic of the Congo)
- Carabidomemnus reichenspergeri Basilewsky, 1950 (Guinea and Democratic Republic of the Congo)
- Carabidomemnus seineri (Kolbe, 1927) (Zambia)
- Carabidomemnus vaticinus (Kolbe, 1927) (Cameroon)
- Carabidomemnus vilhenai Luna de Carvalho, 1959 (Angola)
