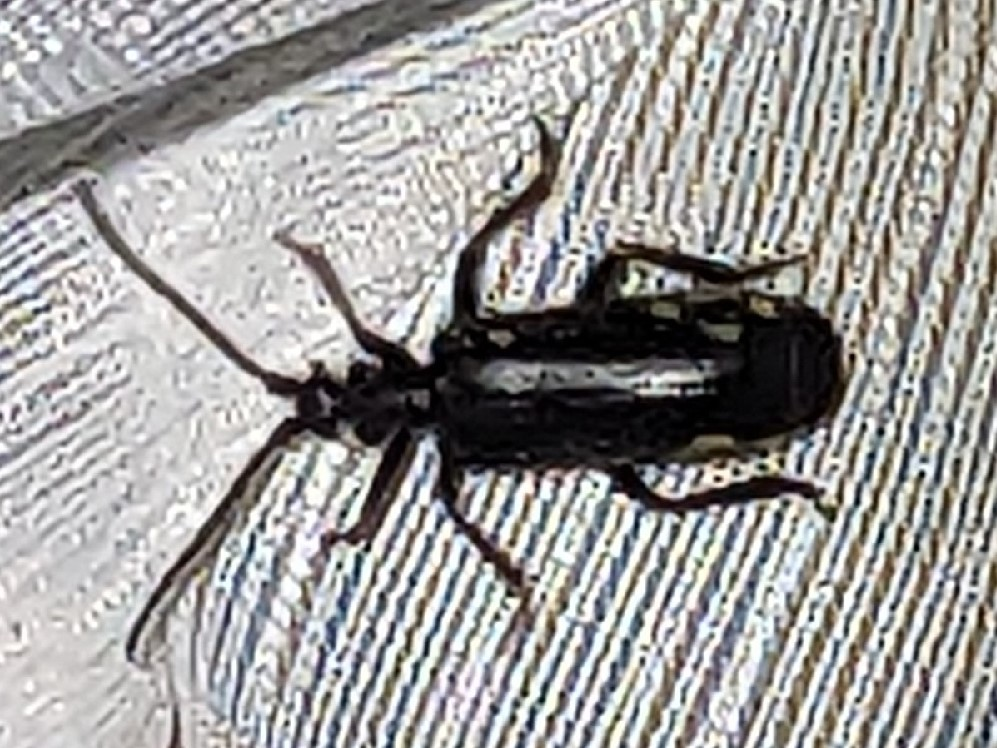

Scientific classification
- Kingdom: Animalia
- Phylum: Arthropoda
- Clade: Pancrustacea
- Class: Insecta
- Order: Coleoptera
- Suborder: Adephaga
- Family: Carabidae
- Tribe: Paussini
- Subtribe: Cerapterina
- Genus: Megalopaussus; Lea, 1906
- Species: M. amplipennis

Binomial name
- Megalopaussus amplipennis Lea, 1906

= Megalopaussus =

Genus of beetles

Megalopaussus is a genus of ground beetles in the family Carabidae. It is monotypic, with the single species Megalopaussus amplipennis found in Australia.
