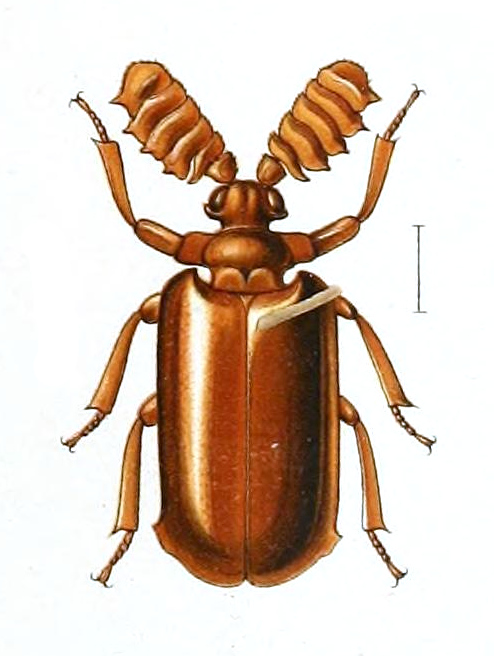
- Lebioderus gorii

Scientific classification
- Kingdom: Animalia
- Phylum: Arthropoda
- Class: Insecta
- Order: Coleoptera
- Suborder: Adephaga
- Family: Carabidae
- Subfamily: Paussinae
- Tribe: Paussini
- Subtribe: Paussina
- Genus: Lebioderus; Westwood, 1838

= Lebioderus =

Genus of beetles

Lebioderus is a genus in the beetle family Carabidae. There are about 11 described species in Lebioderus.

== Species ==
These 11 species belong to the genus Lebioderus:

- Lebioderus bakeri Heller, 1926 (Philippines)
- Lebioderus brancuccii Nagel, 2009 (Laos)
- Lebioderus candezei C.A.Dohrn, 1888 (Indonesia and Borneo)
- Lebioderus dissimilis Luna de Carvalho, 1973
- Lebioderus gorii Westwood, 1838 (Indonesia)
- Lebioderus javanus C.A.Dohrn, 1891 (Indonesia)
- Lebioderus maolanus Song & Maruyama, 2017 (China)
- Lebioderus percheronii Westwood, 1874 (Malaysia and Indonesia)
- Lebioderus ritsemae Gestro, 1901 (Indonesia)
- Lebioderus sinicus Song & Maruyama, 2017 (China)
- Lebioderus thaianus Maruyama, 2008 (Thailand)
