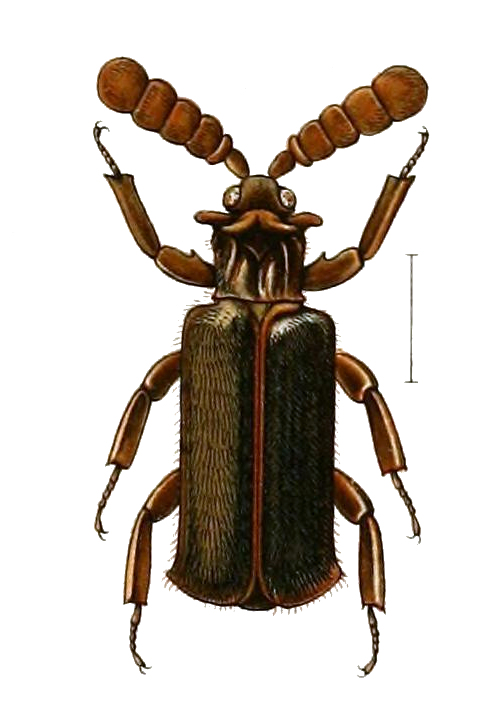
- Pentaplatarthrus bottegi

Scientific classification
- Kingdom: Animalia
- Phylum: Arthropoda
- Class: Insecta
- Order: Coleoptera
- Suborder: Adephaga
- Family: Carabidae
- Subfamily: Paussinae
- Tribe: Paussini
- Subtribe: Pentaplatarthrina
- Genus: Pentaplatarthrus; Westwood, 1833

Subgenera
- Hyperpentarthrus Kolbe, 1927; Pentaplatarthrus Westwood, 1833

Synonyms
- Pentaplatarthus

= Pentaplatarthrus =

Genus of beetles

Pentaplatarthrus is a genus of in the beetle family Carabidae. There are about eight described species in Pentaplatarthrus, found in Africa. These are ant nest beetles and are obligate myrmecophiles, predatory on ant larvae and workers.

== Species ==
These eight species belong to the genus Pentaplatarthrus:

- Pentaplatarthrus bottegi Gestro, 1895 (Sudan, Somalia, and Tanzania)
- Pentaplatarthrus dollmanni Wasmann, 1922 (Zambia, Zimbabwe, and Botswana)
- Pentaplatarthrus focki Wasmann, 1919 (Namibia and South Africa)
- Pentaplatarthrus gestroi Kolbe, 1896 (Kenya, Tanzania, Mozambique, Zimbabwe, and Namibia)
- Pentaplatarthrus natalensis Westwood, 1850 (Namibia and South Africa)
- Pentaplatarthrus paussoides Westwood, 1833 (Botswana, Namibia, and South Africa)
- Pentaplatarthrus schoutedeni Reichensperger, 1925 (the Democratic Republic of the Congo)
- Pentaplatarthrus vandamii van de Poll, 1886 (Angola and South Africa)
