= Gibbozaena =

Scientific classification
- Domain: Eukaryota
- Kingdom: Animalia
- Phylum: Arthropoda
- Class: Insecta
- Order: Coleoptera
- Suborder: Adephaga
- Family: Carabidae
- Subfamily: Paussinae
- Tribe: Ozaenini
- Subtribe: Ozaenina
- Genus: Gibbozaena; Deuve, 2001
- Species: G. mirabilis

Binomial name
- Gibbozaena mirabilis Deuve, 2002

Genus of beetles

Gibbozaena mirabilis is a species of beetle in the family Carabidae, the only species in the genus Gibbozaena.
