= Inflatozaena =

Scientific classification
- Domain: Eukaryota
- Kingdom: Animalia
- Phylum: Arthropoda
- Class: Insecta
- Order: Coleoptera
- Suborder: Adephaga
- Family: Carabidae
- Subfamily: Paussinae
- Tribe: Ozaenini
- Subtribe: Ozaenina
- Genus: Inflatozaena; Deuve, 2001
- Species: I. inflata

Binomial name
- Inflatozaena inflata (Bates, 1884)

Genus of beetles

Inflatozaena inflata is a species of beetle in the family Carabidae, the only species in the genus Inflatozaena.
