= Eopaussus =

Eopaussus Temporal range: Priabonian

Scientific classification
- Kingdom: Animalia
- Phylum: Arthropoda
- Clade: Pancrustacea
- Class: Insecta
- Order: Coleoptera
- Suborder: Adephaga
- Family: Carabidae
- Subfamily: Paussinae
- Tribe: Paussini
- Subtribe: †Eopaussina
- Genus: †Eopaussus; Wasmann, 1926
- Species: †E. baltians

Binomial name
- †Eopaussus baltians Wasmann, 1926

Extinct genus of beetles

Eopaussus is an extinct genus of ground beetles in the family Carabidae. This genus has a single species, Eopaussus baltians.
