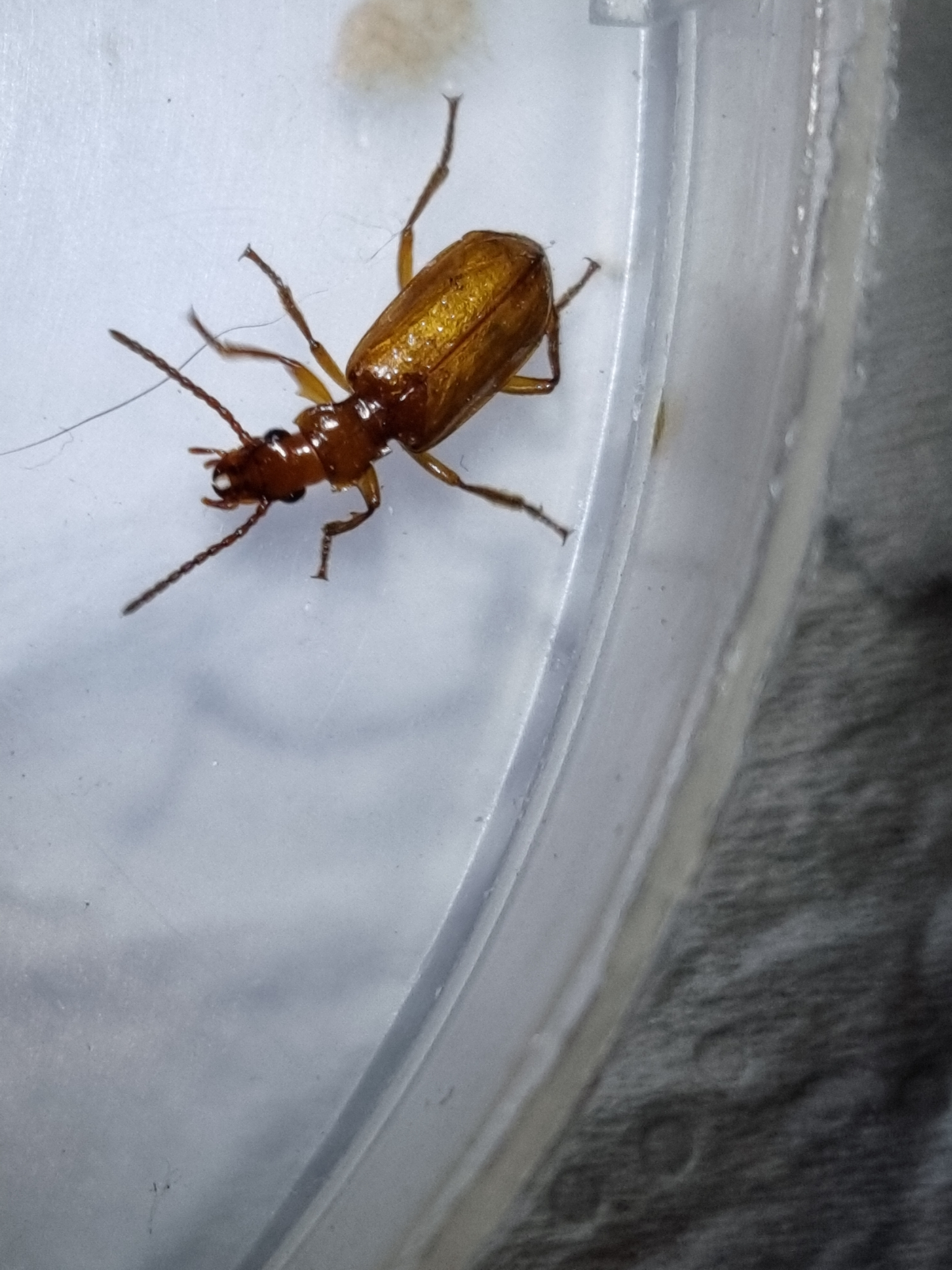
- Pachyteles, Argentina

Scientific classification
- Domain: Eukaryota
- Kingdom: Animalia
- Phylum: Arthropoda
- Class: Insecta
- Order: Coleoptera
- Suborder: Adephaga
- Family: Carabidae
- Subfamily: Paussinae
- Tribe: Ozaenini
- Subtribe: Ozaenina
- Genus: Pachyteles; Perty, 1830

= Pachyteles =

Genus of beetles

Pachyteles is a genus in the beetle family Carabidae. There are more than 50 described species in Pachyteles.

== Species ==
These 54 species belong to the genus Pachyteles:

- Pachyteles angustatus Chaudoir, 1868 (Colombia)
- Pachyteles arechavaletae Chaudoir, 1868 (Uruguay)
- Pachyteles aspericollis Bates, 1874 (Brazil)
- Pachyteles bacillus Bates, 1881 (Nicaragua)
- Pachyteles baleni Steinheil, 1875 (Colombia)
- Pachyteles besckii (Chaudoir, 1854) (Brazil)
- Pachyteles brunneus (Dejean, 1825) (French Guiana and Brazil)
- Pachyteles castaneus (Dejean, 1831) (Colombia and Venezuela)
- Pachyteles colasi Deuve, 2001 (Bolivia)
- Pachyteles confusus (Chaudoir, 1854)
- Pachyteles costaricensis Deuve, 2004
- Pachyteles delauneyi Fleutiaux & Sallé, 1890 (the Lesser Antilles)
- Pachyteles digiulioi Deuve, 2000 (Ecuador)
- Pachyteles distinctus Chaudoir, 1868 (French Guiana)
- Pachyteles enischnus Ball & McCleve, 1990 (Mexico)
- Pachyteles excisus Chaudoir, 1868 (French Guiana and Nicaragua)
- Pachyteles filiformis (Laporte, 1834) (French Guiana, Brazil, Nicaragua)
- Pachyteles fuliginellus Bates, 1874 (Nicaragua)
- Pachyteles funckii Chaudoir, 1868 (Venezuela)
- Pachyteles fuscocephalus Deuve, 2001 (Brazil)
- Pachyteles fusculus Bates, 1874 (Brazil)
- Pachyteles gibbus Bänninger, 1928 (Brazil)
- Pachyteles glaber (Klug, 1834) (Brazil)
- Pachyteles goniaderus Bates, 1874 (Brazil)
- Pachyteles gyllenhalii (Dejean, 1825) (North, Central, South America)
- Pachyteles haroldi Steinheil, 1875 (Colombia)
- Pachyteles lacordairei Chaudoir, 1868 (French Guiana)
- Pachyteles laevigatus (Dejean & Boisduval, 1829) (Brazil)
- Pachyteles longicornis Bates, 1884 (Panama)
- Pachyteles longulus Chaudoir, 1868 (French Guiana)
- Pachyteles mexicanus (Chaudoir, 1848) (Nicaragua, Guatemala, Mexico)
- Pachyteles modestus Chaudoir, 1868 (Brazil)
- Pachyteles nigripennis Brullé, 1837 (Bolivia)
- Pachyteles oxyomus Chaudoir, 1868 (Mexico)
- Pachyteles parvicollis Chaudoir, 1868 (Brazil)
- Pachyteles pasconis (Schaum, 1863) (Brazil)
- Pachyteles peruvianus Bates, 1874 (Peru)
- Pachyteles politus (Reiche, 1843) (Colombia)
- Pachyteles porrectus Chaudoir, 1868 (Nicaragua, Belize, Guatemala, Mexico)
- Pachyteles praeustus (Laporte, 1834) (French Guiana)
- Pachyteles pseudovignai Deuve, 2007
- Pachyteles punctulatus Chaudoir, 1868 (Belize and Mexico)
- Pachyteles semirufus Chaudoir, 1868 (Brazil)
- Pachyteles seriatus (Chaudoir, 1854) (Brazil)
- Pachyteles seriepunctatus Chaudoir, 1868 (Colombia)
- Pachyteles striola Perty, 1830 (Colombia, Guyana, Brazil)
- Pachyteles sulcipennis Bates, 1874 (Brazil)
- Pachyteles tapajonus Bates, 1874 (Brazil)
- Pachyteles trinidadensis Deuve, 2004
- Pachyteles tuberculatus Perty, 1830 (Brazil)
- Pachyteles undulatus Bates, 1874 (Brazil)
- Pachyteles verruciger Chaudoir, 1868 (Brazil)
- Pachyteles verrucosus Chaudoir, 1868 (Venezuela)
- Pachyteles vignai Deuve, 2000 (Ecuador)
