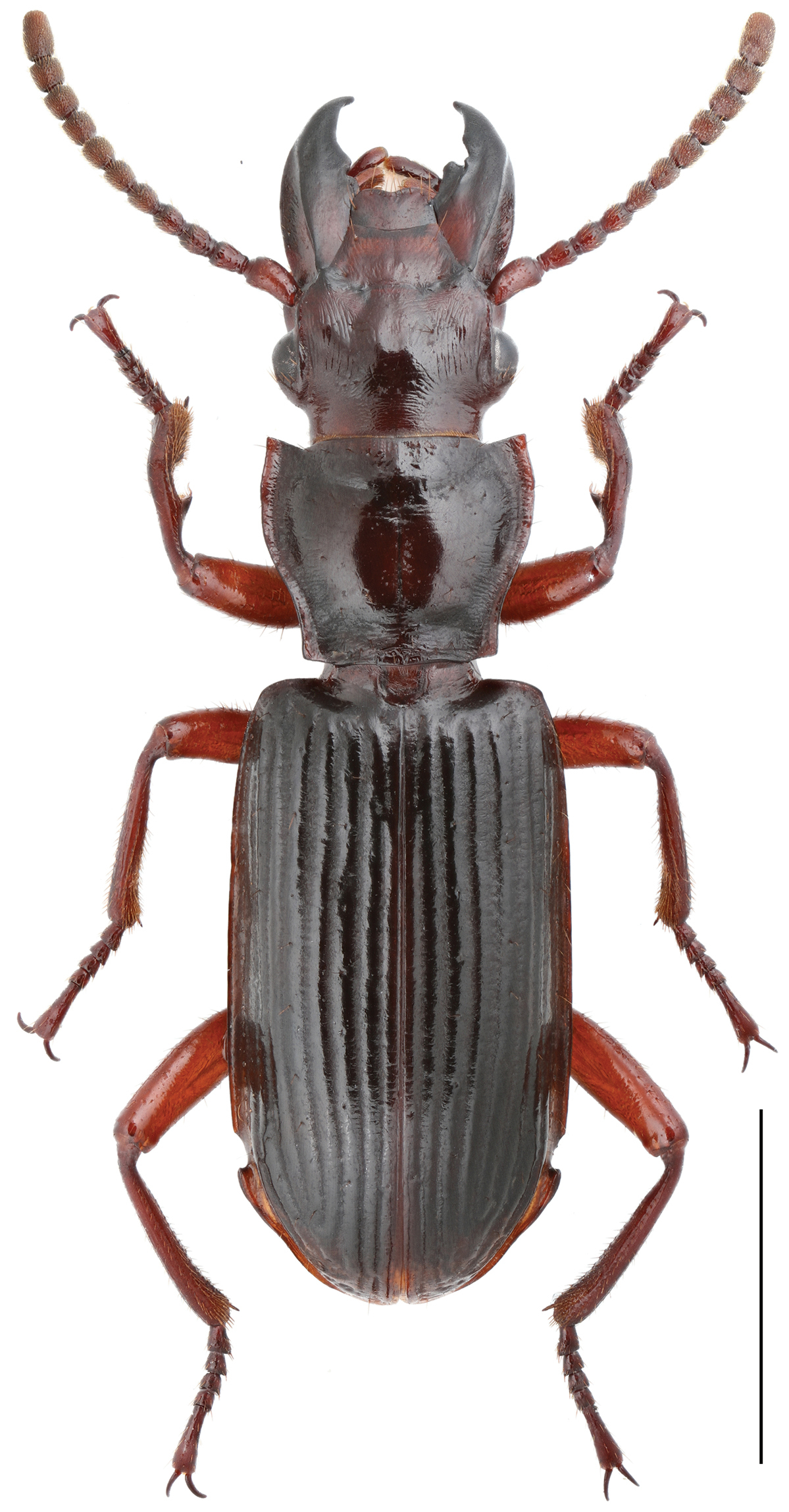

Scientific classification
- Kingdom: Animalia
- Phylum: Arthropoda
- Class: Insecta
- Order: Coleoptera
- Suborder: Adephaga
- Family: Carabidae
- Subfamily: Paussinae
- Tribe: Ozaenini
- Genus: Itamus; Schmidt-Goebel, 1846

= Itamus =

Genus of beetles

Itamus is a genus in the beetle family Carabidae. There are about five described species in Itamus.

== Species ==
These five species belong to the genus Itamus:

- Itamus castaneus Schmidt-Goebel, 1846 (China, Pakistan, Nepal, India, Myanmar, Thailand, Laos, and Vietnam)
- Itamus cavicola (B.Moore, 1978) (New Guinea)
- Itamus dentatus Andrewes, 1919 (China and Vietnam)
- Itamus deuvei Tian, 2011 (Vietnam)
- Itamus kaszabi Jedlicka, 1968 (Vietnam)
