= Proozaena =

Scientific classification
- Domain: Eukaryota
- Kingdom: Animalia
- Phylum: Arthropoda
- Class: Insecta
- Order: Coleoptera
- Suborder: Adephaga
- Family: Carabidae
- Subfamily: Paussinae
- Tribe: Ozaenini
- Subtribe: Ozaenina
- Genus: Proozaena; Deuve, 2001

Genus of beetles

Proozaena is a genus in the beetle family Carabidae. There are about six described species in Proozaena.

== Species ==
These six species belong to the genus Proozaena:

- Proozaena cerdai Deuve, 2005
- Proozaena flavonigra Deuve, 2007
- Proozaena lata Deuve, 2004
- Proozaena mooreae Deuve, 2007
- Proozaena nigricornis Deuve, 2004
- Proozaena parallelus (Chaudoir, 1848) (Brazil)
