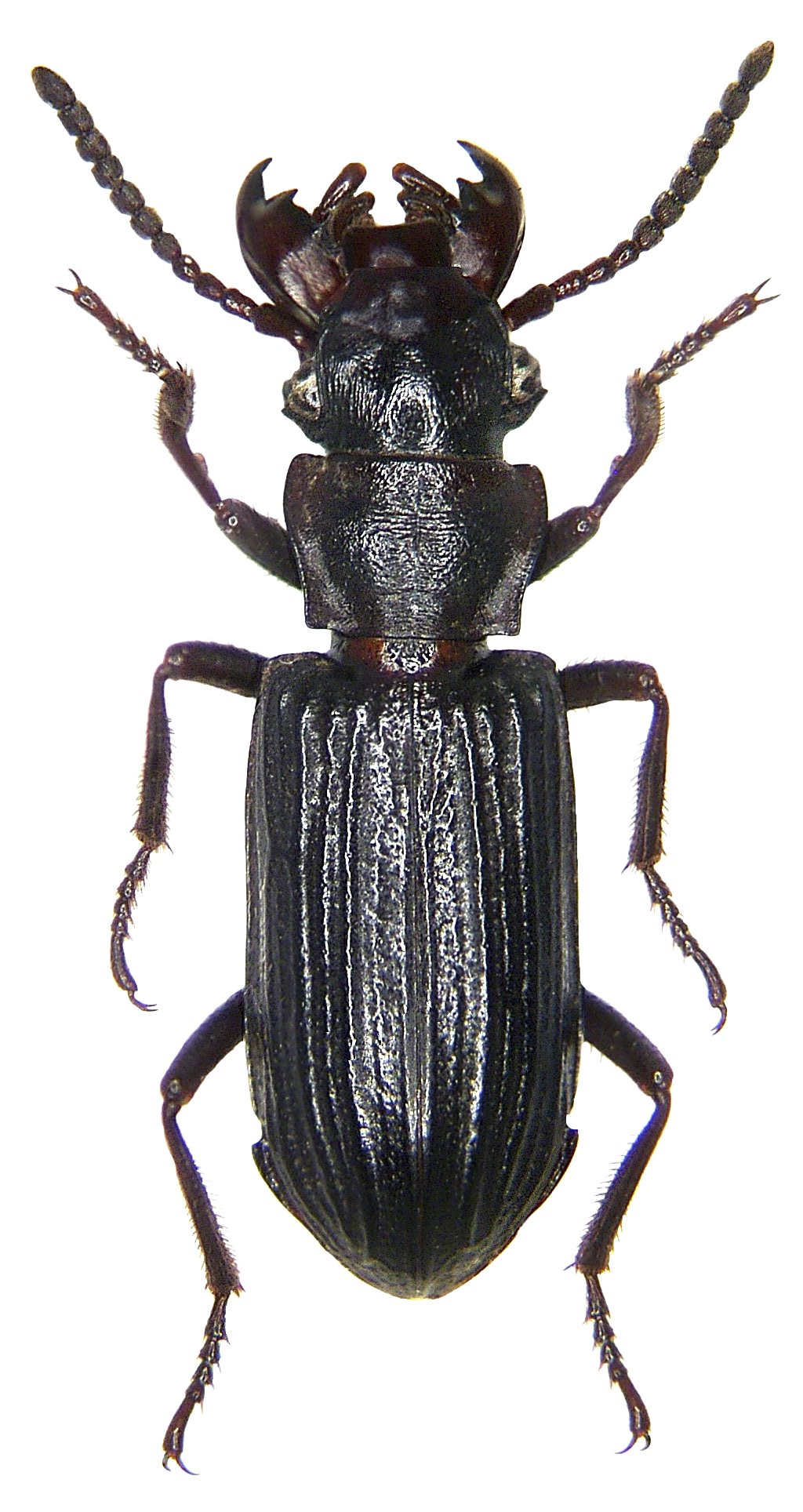
- Pseudozaena tricostata opaca

Scientific classification
- Domain: Eukaryota
- Kingdom: Animalia
- Phylum: Arthropoda
- Class: Insecta
- Order: Coleoptera
- Suborder: Adephaga
- Family: Carabidae
- Subfamily: Paussinae
- Tribe: Ozaenini
- Subtribe: Pseudozaenina
- Genus: Pseudozaena; Laporte, 1834

= Pseudozaena =

Genus of beetles

Pseudozaena is a genus of beetles in the family Carabidae, containing the following species:

- Pseudozaena orientalis Klug, 1834
- Pseudozaena tricostata (Montrouzier, 1855)
