= Eohomopterus =

Scientific classification
- Domain: Eukaryota
- Kingdom: Animalia
- Phylum: Arthropoda
- Class: Insecta
- Order: Coleoptera
- Suborder: Adephaga
- Family: Carabidae
- Subfamily: Paussinae
- Tribe: Paussini
- Subtribe: Carabidomemnina
- Genus: Eohomopterus; Wasmann, 1919

Genus of beetles

Eohomopterus is a genus in the beetle family Carabidae. There are about five described species in Eohomopterus.

== Species ==
These five species belong to the genus Eohomopterus:

- Eohomopterus aequatoriensis (Wasmann, 1899) (Ecuador)
- Eohomopterus centenarius Luna de Carvalho, 1960 (Brazil)
- † Eohomopterus paulmuelleri Nagel, 1987
- † Eohomopterus poinari Nagel, 1997
- † Eohomopterus simojovelensis Kraemer, 2006
