= Tachypeles rossii =

Scientific classification
- Kingdom: Animalia
- Phylum: Arthropoda
- Class: Insecta
- Order: Coleoptera
- Suborder: Adephaga
- Family: Carabidae
- Genus: Tachypeles
- Species: T. rossii

Binomial name
- Tachypeles rossii Deuve, 2004

Species of beetle

Tachypeles rossii is a species of ground beetle in the subfamily Paussinae in the genus Tachypeles. It was discovered by the scientist Deuve in 2004.
