= Pterorhopalus =

Scientific classification
- Kingdom: Animalia
- Phylum: Arthropoda
- Class: Insecta
- Order: Coleoptera
- Suborder: Adephaga
- Family: Carabidae
- Tribe: Paussini
- Subtribe: Paussina
- Genus: Pterorhopalus; Maruyama, 2011
- Species: P. mizotai

Binomial name
- Pterorhopalus mizotai Maruyama, 2011

Genus of beetles

Pterorhopalus is a genus in the ground beetle family Carabidae. This genus has a single species, Pterorhopalus mizotai. It is found in Malaysia, Indonesia, and Borneo.
