= Anentmetus =

Scientific classification
- Domain: Eukaryota
- Kingdom: Animalia
- Phylum: Arthropoda
- Class: Insecta
- Order: Coleoptera
- Suborder: Adephaga
- Family: Carabidae
- Subfamily: Paussinae
- Genus: Anentmetus; Andrewes, 1924

Genus of beetles

Anentmetus is a genus of beetles in the family Carabidae, containing the following species:

- Anentmetus pluto Andrewes, 1924
- Anentmetus spissicornis (Fairmaire, 1888)
