= Tachypeles =

Scientific classification
- Domain: Eukaryota
- Kingdom: Animalia
- Phylum: Arthropoda
- Class: Insecta
- Order: Coleoptera
- Suborder: Adephaga
- Family: Carabidae
- Subfamily: Paussinae
- Genus: Tachypeles; Deuve, 2001

Genus of beetles

Tachypeles is a genus of in the beetle family Carabidae. There are more than 20 described species in Tachypeles, some found in South America.

== Species ==
These 25 species belong to the genus Tachypeles:

- Tachypeles bechynei Deuve, 2004
- Tachypeles boulardi Deuve, 2004
- Tachypeles cordicollis Deuve, 2009
- Tachypeles davidsoni Deuve, 2004
- Tachypeles degallieri Deuve, 2005
- Tachypeles dichroma Deuve, 2009
- Tachypeles durantoni Deuve, 2004
- Tachypeles erwinorum Deuve, 2009
- Tachypeles gonioderoides Deuve, 2007
- Tachypeles hudsoni Deuve, 2004
- Tachypeles lecordieri Deuve, 2001
- Tachypeles limonensis Deuve, 2007
- Tachypeles mantillerii Deuve, 2018
- Tachypeles mitaraka Deuve, 2018
- Tachypeles moraguesi Deuve, 2005
- Tachypeles moretellus Deuve, 2005
- Tachypeles moretianus Deuve, 2004
- Tachypeles parallelipipedus Deuve, 2004
- Tachypeles perditus Deuve, 2018
- Tachypeles perraulti Deuve, 2004
- Tachypeles rossii Deuve, 2004
- Tachypeles seriatopunctatoides Deuve, 2005
- Tachypeles shushufindiensis Deuve, 2005
- Tachypeles simulans Deuve, 2018
- Tachypeles troglobioticus Deuve, 2004
