= Physea hirta =

Scientific classification
- Domain: Eukaryota
- Kingdom: Animalia
- Phylum: Arthropoda
- Class: Insecta
- Order: Coleoptera
- Suborder: Adephaga
- Family: Carabidae
- Genus: Physea
- Species: P. hirta

Binomial name
- Physea hirta LeConte, 1853

Species of beetle

Physea hirta is a species of ground beetle in the family Carabidae. It is found in Central America and North America.
