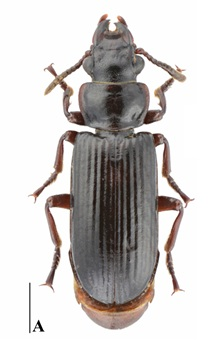

Scientific classification
- Kingdom: Animalia
- Phylum: Arthropoda
- Class: Insecta
- Order: Coleoptera
- Suborder: Adephaga
- Family: Carabidae
- Genus: Anentmetus
- Species: A. spissicornis

Binomial name
- Anentmetus spissicornis (Fairmaire, 1889)

Synonyms
- Pseudozaena spissicornis Fairmaire, 1889

= Anentmetus spissicornis =

Species of beetle of the Carabidae family

Anentmetus spissicornis is a species of beetle of the Carabidae family. This species is found in China (Hainan) and Laos.
