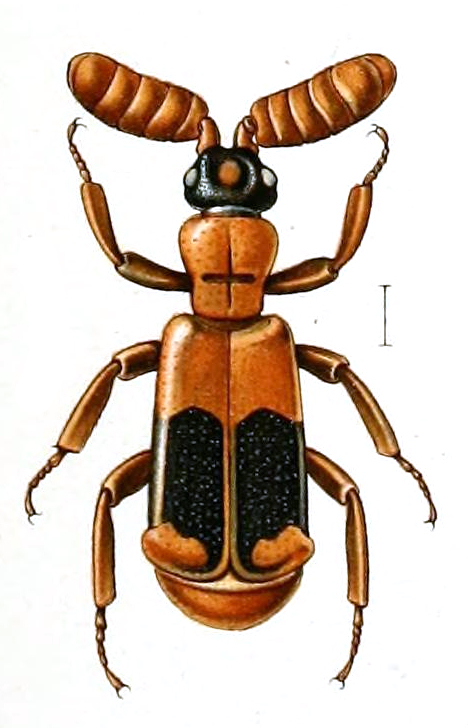
- Ceratoderus oberthueri

Scientific classification
- Domain: Eukaryota
- Kingdom: Animalia
- Phylum: Arthropoda
- Class: Insecta
- Order: Coleoptera
- Suborder: Adephaga
- Superfamily: Caraboidea
- Family: Carabidae
- Subfamily: Paussinae
- Genus: Ceratoderus; Westwood, 1841

= Ceratoderus =

Genus of beetles

Ceratoderus is a genus in the beetle family Carabidae. There are about 11 described species in Ceratoderus.

== Species ==
These 11 species belong to the genus Ceratoderus:

- Ceratoderus akikoae Maruyama, 2014 (Vietnam)
- Ceratoderus bifasciatus (Kollar, 1836) (Pakistan, Nepal, Bangladesh, India, and Myanmar)
- Ceratoderus fukuii Maruyama, 2018 (Laos)
- Ceratoderus jendeki Maruyama, 2014 (Laos)
- Ceratoderus kentaroi Maruyama, 2014 (Vietnam)
- Ceratoderus klapperichi Reichensperger, 1954 (Afghanistan and India)
- Ceratoderus oberthueri Gestro, 1901 (India)
- Ceratoderus palpalis Reichensperger, 1935 (Indonesia)
- Ceratoderus tonkinensis Wasmann, 1921 (China and Vietnam)
- Ceratoderus venustus Hisamatsu, 1963 (Japan)
- Ceratoderus yunnanensis Maruyama, 2014 (China)
