= Goniotropis parca =

Scientific classification
- Kingdom: Animalia
- Phylum: Arthropoda
- Class: Insecta
- Order: Coleoptera
- Suborder: Adephaga
- Family: Carabidae
- Genus: Goniotropis
- Species: G. parca

Binomial name
- Goniotropis parca (LeConte, 1884)

Synonyms
- Pachyteles beyeri Notman, 1919; Pachyteles parca LeConte, 1884

Species of beetle

Goniotropis parca is a species of ground beetle in the family Carabidae. It is found in Central America and North America.
