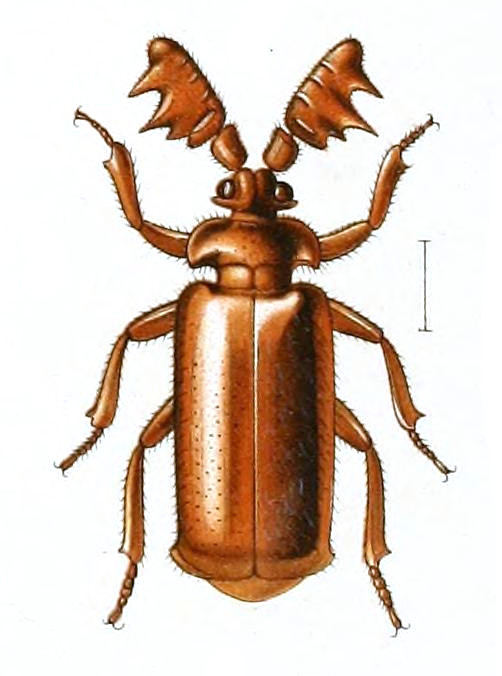
- Euplatyrhopalus aplustrifer

Scientific classification
- Domain: Eukaryota
- Kingdom: Animalia
- Phylum: Arthropoda
- Class: Insecta
- Order: Coleoptera
- Suborder: Adephaga
- Family: Carabidae
- Subfamily: Paussinae
- Genus: Euplatyrhopalus; Desneux, 1905

= Euplatyrhopalus =

Genus of beetles

Euplatyrhopalus is a genus in the beetle family Carabidae. There are about seven described species in Euplatyrhopalus.

== Species ==
These seven species belong to the genus Euplatyrhopalus:

- Euplatyrhopalus aplustrifer (Westwood, 1833) (Bangladesh and India)
- Euplatyrhopalus armicornis (Fairmaire, 1896) (Indonesia)
- Euplatyrhopalus macrophyllus (van de Poll, 1890) (Indonesia)
- Euplatyrhopalus simonis (C.A.Dohrn, 1886) (China)
- Euplatyrhopalus tadauchii Maruyama; Nomura & Sakchoowong, 2012 (Thailand)
- Euplatyrhopalus vexillifer (Westwood, 1874) (Bhutan, India, Myanmar, and Malaysia)
- Euplatyrhopalus wasmanni Emden, 1927 (Indonesia, Borneo, and New Guinea)
