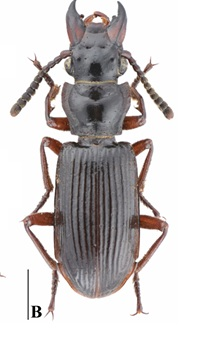

Scientific classification
- Domain: Eukaryota
- Kingdom: Animalia
- Phylum: Arthropoda
- Class: Insecta
- Order: Coleoptera
- Suborder: Adephaga
- Family: Carabidae
- Genus: Itamus
- Species: I. castaneus

Binomial name
- Itamus castaneus Schmidt-Goebel, 1846

= Itamus castaneus =

Species of beetle

Itamus castaneus is a species of beetle of the Carabidae family. This species is found in China (Hainan, Hunan, Jiangxi, Shanghai, Zhejiang, Fujian, Guangdong, Yunnan), Myanmar, Laos, Sri Lanka and Thailand.
