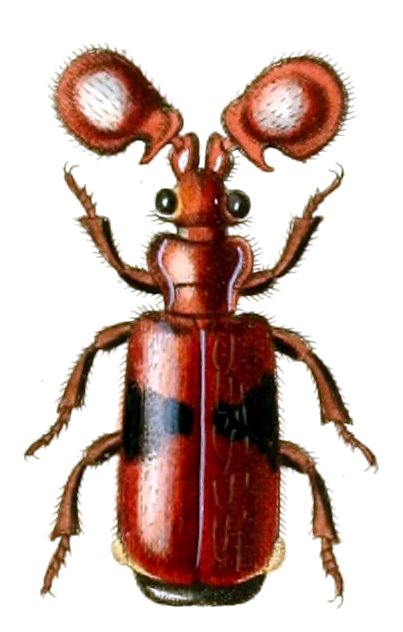

Scientific classification
- Domain: Eukaryota
- Kingdom: Animalia
- Phylum: Arthropoda
- Class: Insecta
- Order: Coleoptera
- Suborder: Adephaga
- Family: Carabidae
- Tribe: Paussini
- Genus: Platyrhopalus; Westwood, 1833

= Platyrhopalus =

Genus of beetles

Platyrhopalus is a genus of beetles in the family Carabidae, containing the following species:

- Platyrhopalus acutidens Westwood, 1833
- Platyrhopalus cardoni Wasmann, 1904
- Platyrhopalus castelnaudi Westwood, 1874
- Platyrhopalus comottii Gestro, 1882
- Platyrhopalus davidis Fairmaire, 1886
- Platyrhopalus denticornis Donovan, 1804
- Platyrhopalus imadatei (Chujo, 1962)
- Platyrhopalus intermedius Benson, 1846
- Platyrhopalus irregularis Ritsema, 1880
- Platyrhopalus mandersi Fowler, 1912
- Platyrhopalus paussoides Wasmann, 1904
- Platyrhopalus quinquepunctatus Shiraki, 1907
- Platyrhopalus tonkinensis Janssens, 1948
- Platyrhopalus westwoodii Saunders, 1838
