= Goniotropis kuntzeni =

Scientific classification
- Domain: Eukaryota
- Kingdom: Animalia
- Phylum: Arthropoda
- Class: Insecta
- Order: Coleoptera
- Suborder: Adephaga
- Family: Carabidae
- Genus: Goniotropis
- Species: G. kuntzeni

Binomial name
- Goniotropis kuntzeni Bänninger, 1927

Species of beetle

Goniotropis kuntzeni is a species of ground beetle in the family Carabidae. It is found in Central America and North America. Adults can be found on trees at night. Larvae dig burrows that they close off with their terminal disk, capturing prey with their terminal disk and dragging prey into the burrow.

== Subspecies ==
These two subspecies belong to the species Goniotropis kuntzeni:

- Goniotropis kuntzeni kuntzeni Bänninger, 1927
- Goniotropis kuntzeni maracayensis Deuve, 2001
