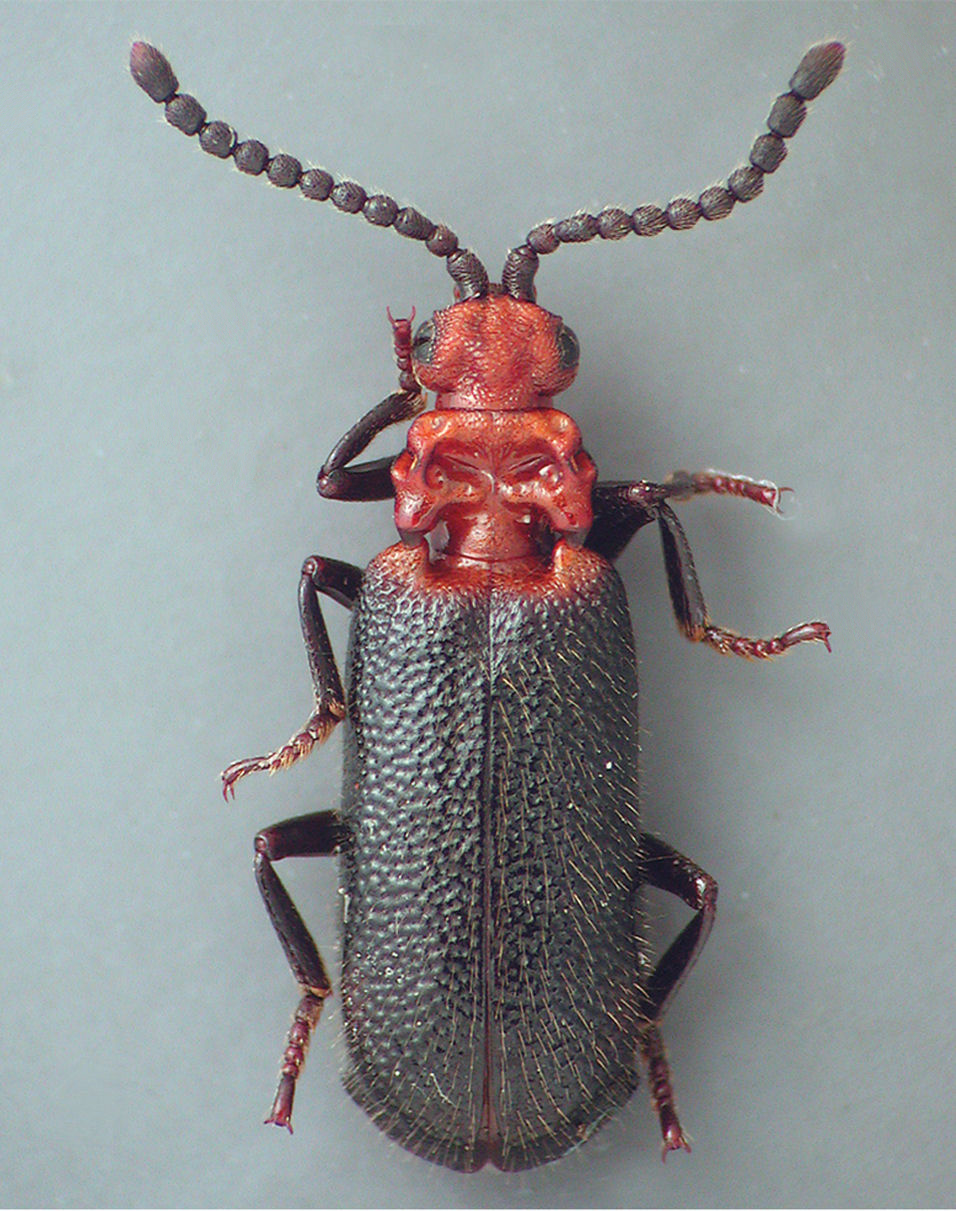
- Protopaussus sp., collected in Thailand
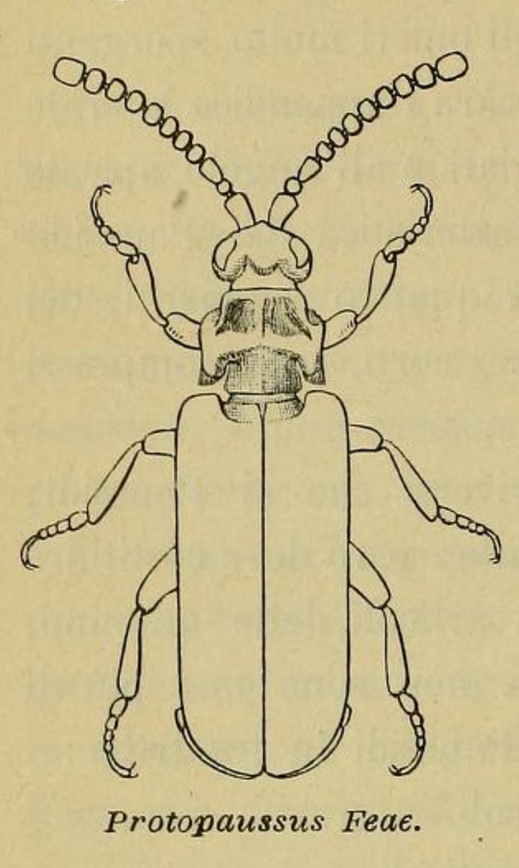
- P. feae, collected in Myanmar.

Scientific classification
- Domain: Eukaryota
- Kingdom: Animalia
- Phylum: Arthropoda
- Class: Insecta
- Order: Coleoptera
- Suborder: Adephaga
- Family: Carabidae
- Subfamily: Paussinae
- Tribe: Protopaussini
- Genus: Protopaussus; Gestro, 1892

Type species
- Protopaussus feae Gestro, 1892

= Protopaussus =

Genus of beetles

Protopaussus is a genus of ground beetles in the family Carabidae, the sole genus of the tribe Protopaussini. It is found in Indomalaya and temperate Asia.

== Species ==
These nine species belong to the genus Protopaussus:

- Protopaussus almorensis Champion, 1923 (India and Nepal)
- Protopaussus bakeri Heller, 1914 (Philippines)
- Protopaussus feae Gestro, 1892 (Myanmar)
- Protopaussus javanus Wasmann, 1912 (Indonesia)
- Protopaussus jeanneli Luna de Carvalho, 1960 (Borneo, Indonesia, and Laos)
- Protopaussus kaszabi Luna de Carvalho, 1967 (Taiwan and temperate Asia)
- Protopaussus vignai Nagel, 2018 (Nepal)
- Protopaussus walkeri C.O. Waterhouse, 1897 (China)
- † Protopaussus pristinus Nagel, 1987
