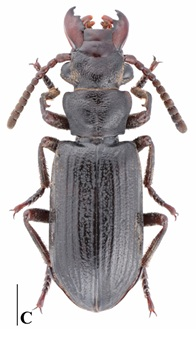

Scientific classification
- Domain: Eukaryota
- Kingdom: Animalia
- Phylum: Arthropoda
- Class: Insecta
- Order: Coleoptera
- Suborder: Adephaga
- Family: Carabidae
- Genus: Pseudozaena
- Species: P. orientalis

Binomial name
- Pseudozaena orientalis (Klug, 1834)

Synonyms
- Ozaena orientalis Klug, 1831; Picrus obscurus Chaudoir, 1868; Ozaena megacephala Laporte, 1834

= Pseudozaena orientalis =

Species of beetle

Pseudozaena orientalis is a species of beetle of the Carabidae family. This species is found in China (Yunnan), Taiwan, Indonesia, Papua New Guinea, Malaysia, Palau, the Philippines and Japan.
