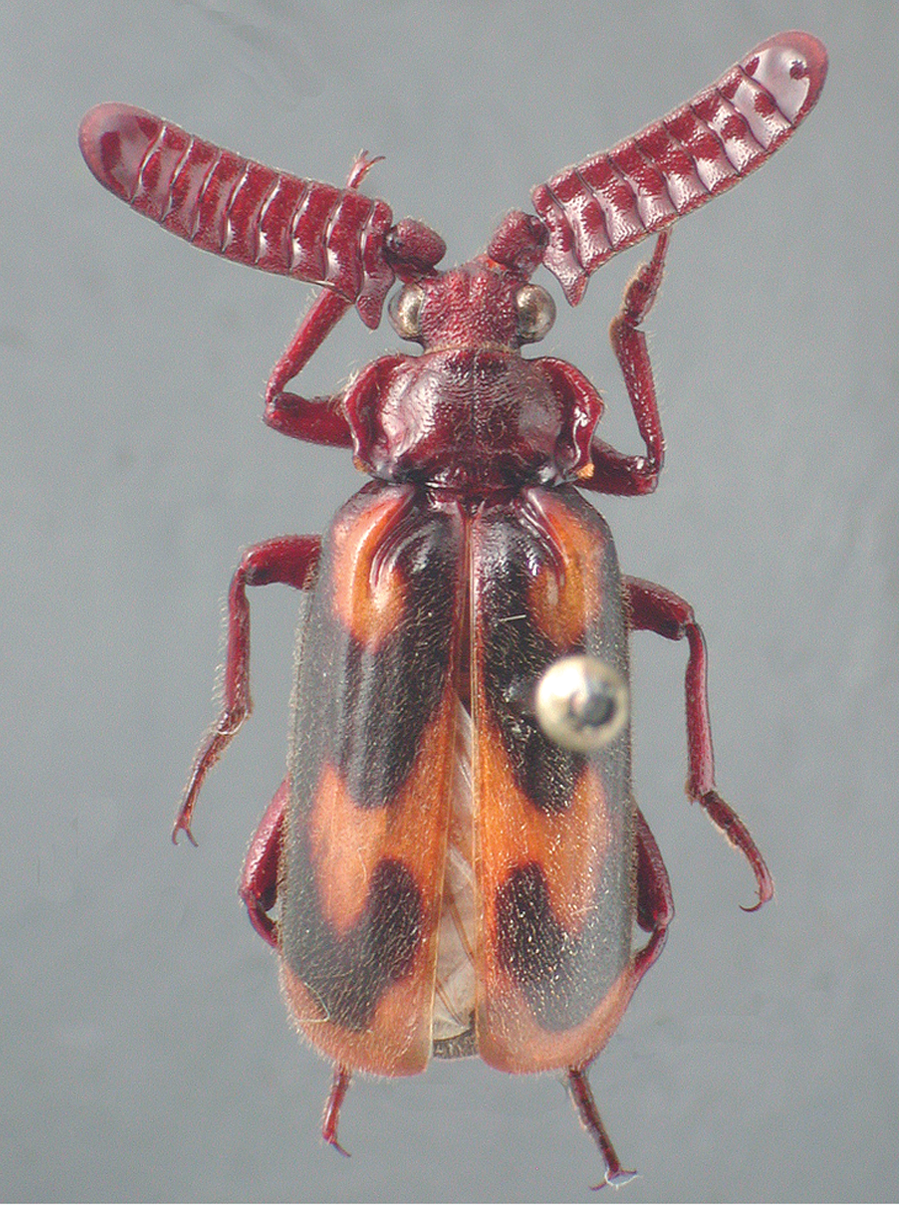
- Heteropaussus hastatus

Scientific classification
- Kingdom: Animalia
- Phylum: Arthropoda
- Class: Insecta
- Order: Coleoptera
- Suborder: Adephaga
- Family: Carabidae
- Subfamily: Paussinae
- Tribe: Paussini
- Subtribe: Heteropaussina
- Genus: Heteropaussus; J.Thomson, 1860

Synonyms
- Janssenius Luna de Carvalho, 1951; Pleuropterinus Wasmann, 1918; Pleuropterus Westwood, 1841

= Heteropaussus =

Genus of beetles

Heteropaussus is a genus in the beetle family Carabidae. There are more than 20 described species in Heteropaussus.

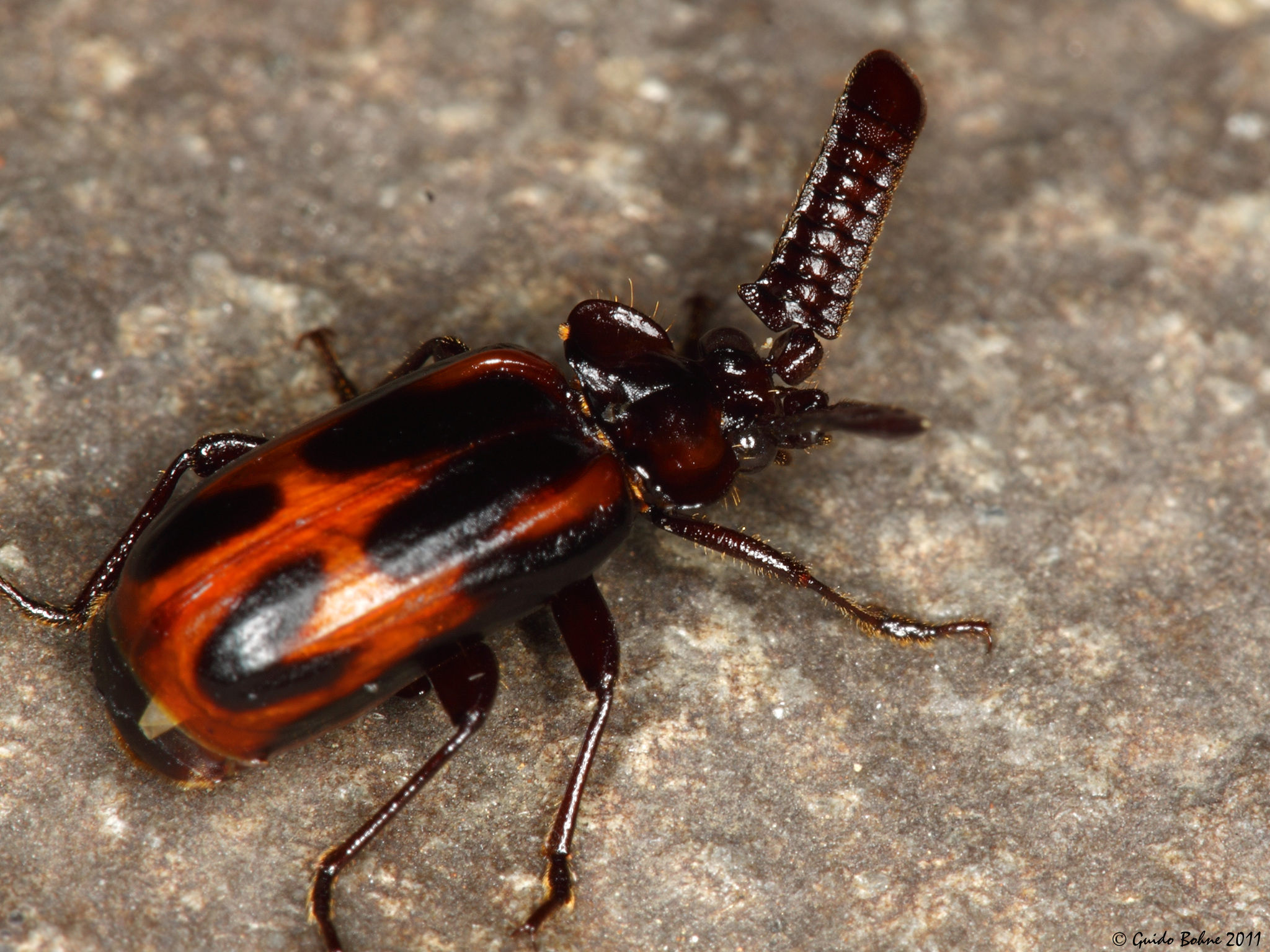
Heteropaussus, Java, Indonesia

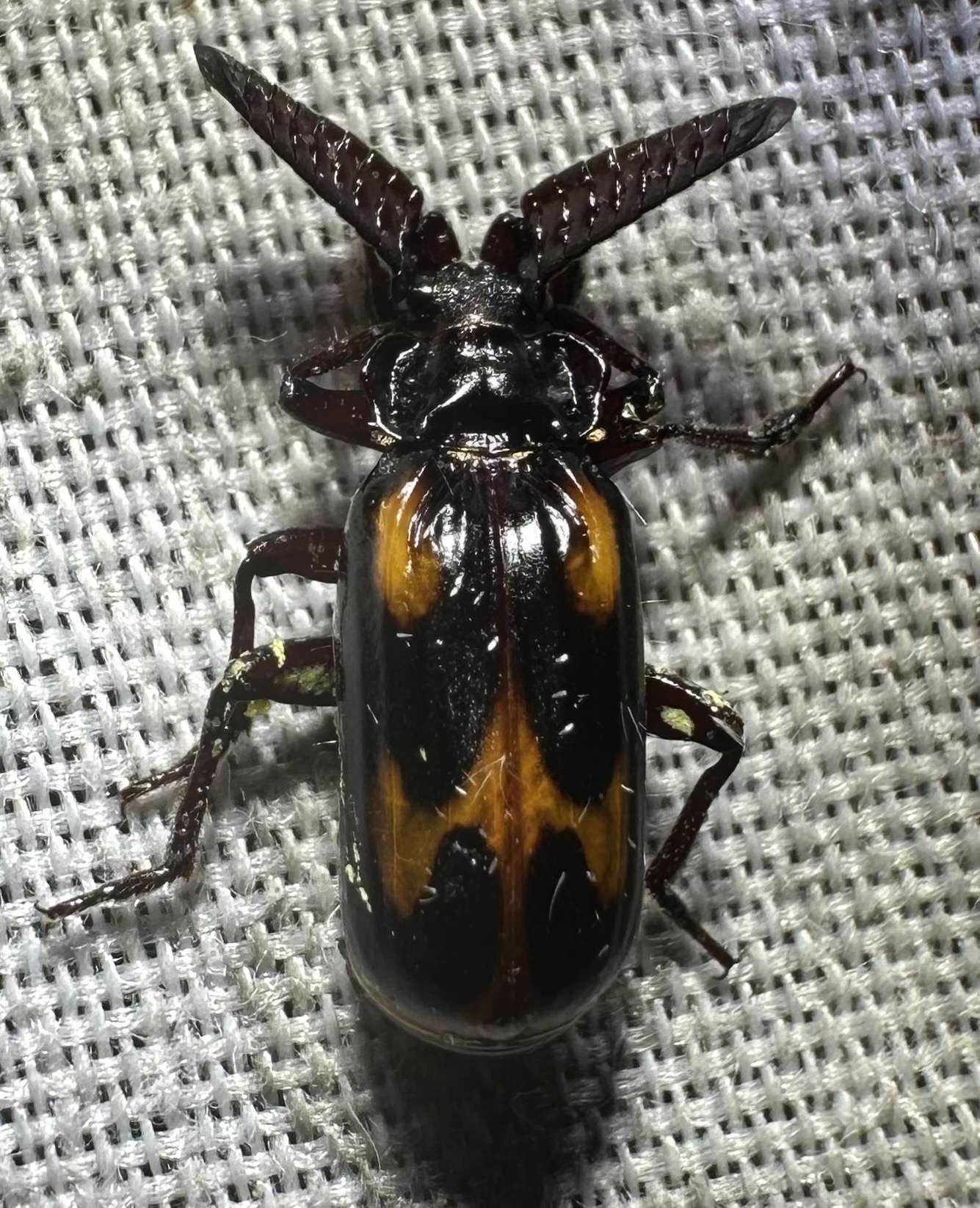
Heteropaussus hastatus, Botswana

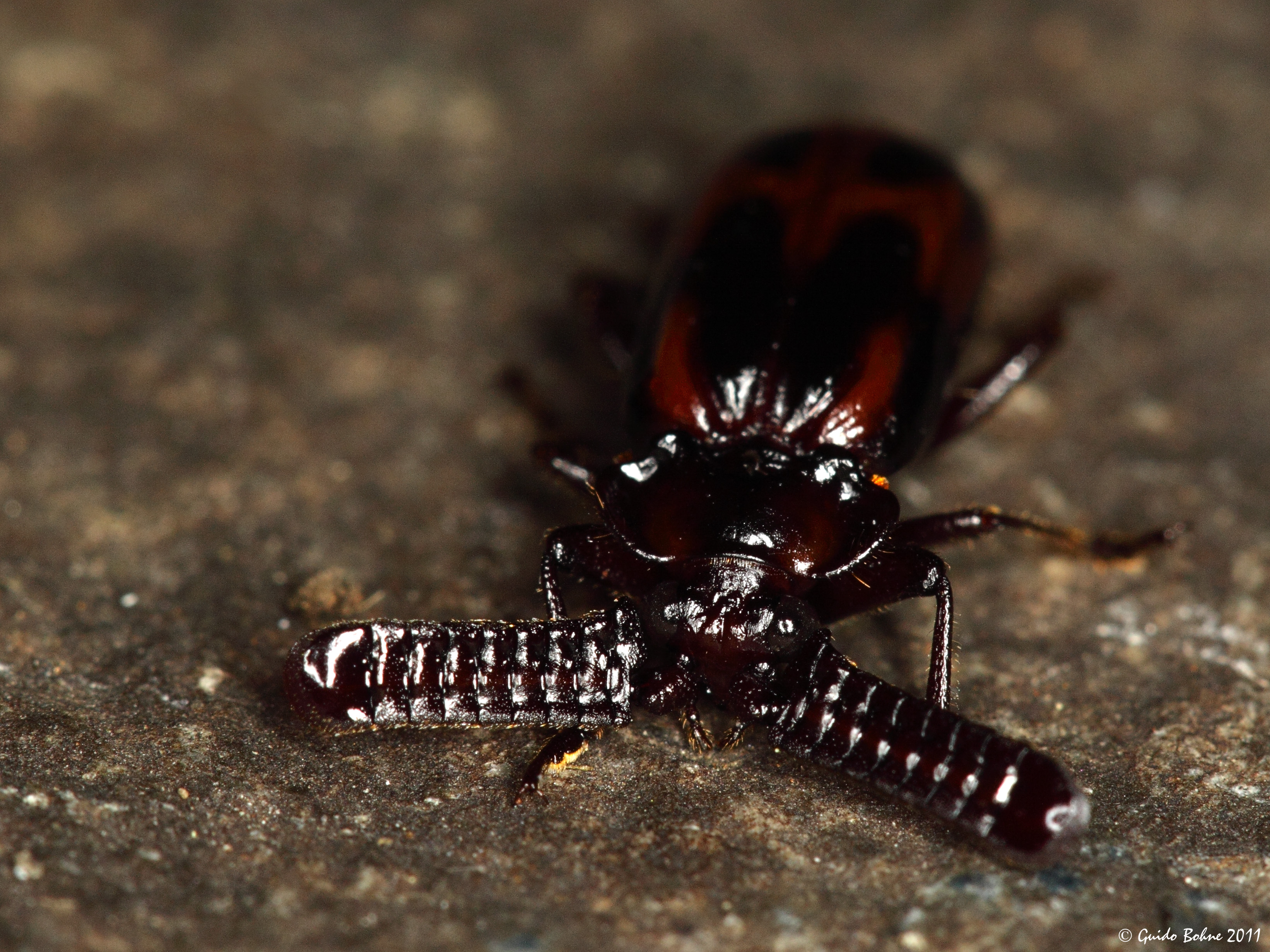
Heteropaussus hastatus

== Species ==
These 26 species belong to the genus Heteropaussus:

- Heteropaussus allardi (Raffray, 1886) (Senegal/Gambia, Guinea-Bissau, Ivory Coast, Ghana)
- Heteropaussus alternans (Westwood, 1850) (Tanzania, Mozambique, Zimbabwe, South Africa)
- Heteropaussus angolensis Luna de Carvalho, 1959 (Angola)
- Heteropaussus basilewskyi (Luna de Carvalho, 1951) (Cameroon)
- Heteropaussus brevicornis (Wasmann, 1904) (Kenya, Zimbabwe)
- Heteropaussus bruecklei Nagel, 1982 (Cameroon)
- Heteropaussus cardonii (Gestro, 1901) (India)
- Heteropaussus corintae Luna de Carvalho, 1958 (Mozambique)
- Heteropaussus curvidens (Reichensperger, 1938) (Kenya)
- Heteropaussus dohrni (Ritsema, 1875) (Equatorial Guinea, Gabon, Congo, DR Congo, Angola)
- Heteropaussus ferranti (Reichensperger, 1925) (Congo, DR Congo, Uganda, Rwanda)
- Heteropaussus flavolineatus (Kraatz, 1899) (Tanzania)
- Heteropaussus hastatus (Westwood, 1850) (Tanzania, Mozambique, Botswana, South Africa)
- Heteropaussus jeanneli (Reichensperger, 1938) (Kenya, Tanzania)
- Heteropaussus kivuensis Luna de Carvalho, 1965 (DR Congo)
- Heteropaussus laticornis (Kolbe, 1896) (Tanzania)
- Heteropaussus lujae (Wasmann, 1907) (Gabon, Congo, DR Congo, Angola)
- Heteropaussus oberthueri (Wasmann, 1904) (Uganda)
- Heteropaussus parallelicornis (Wasmann, 1922) (Zimbabwe)
- Heteropaussus passoscarvalhoi Luna de Carvalho, 1971 (Angola, Namibia)
- Heteropaussus quadricollis (Wasmann, 1910) (Togo)
- Heteropaussus rossi Luna de Carvalho, 1968 (Malawi)
- Heteropaussus simplex (Reichensperger, 1922) (Guinea, Sierra Leone, Ghana, Nigeria)
- Heteropaussus taprobanensis (Gestro, 1901) (Sri Lanka, India)
- Heteropaussus trapezicollis (Wasmann, 1922) (Angola, Mozambique, Zimbabwe)
- Heteropaussus westermanni (Westwood, 1838) (Malaysia, Indonesia)
