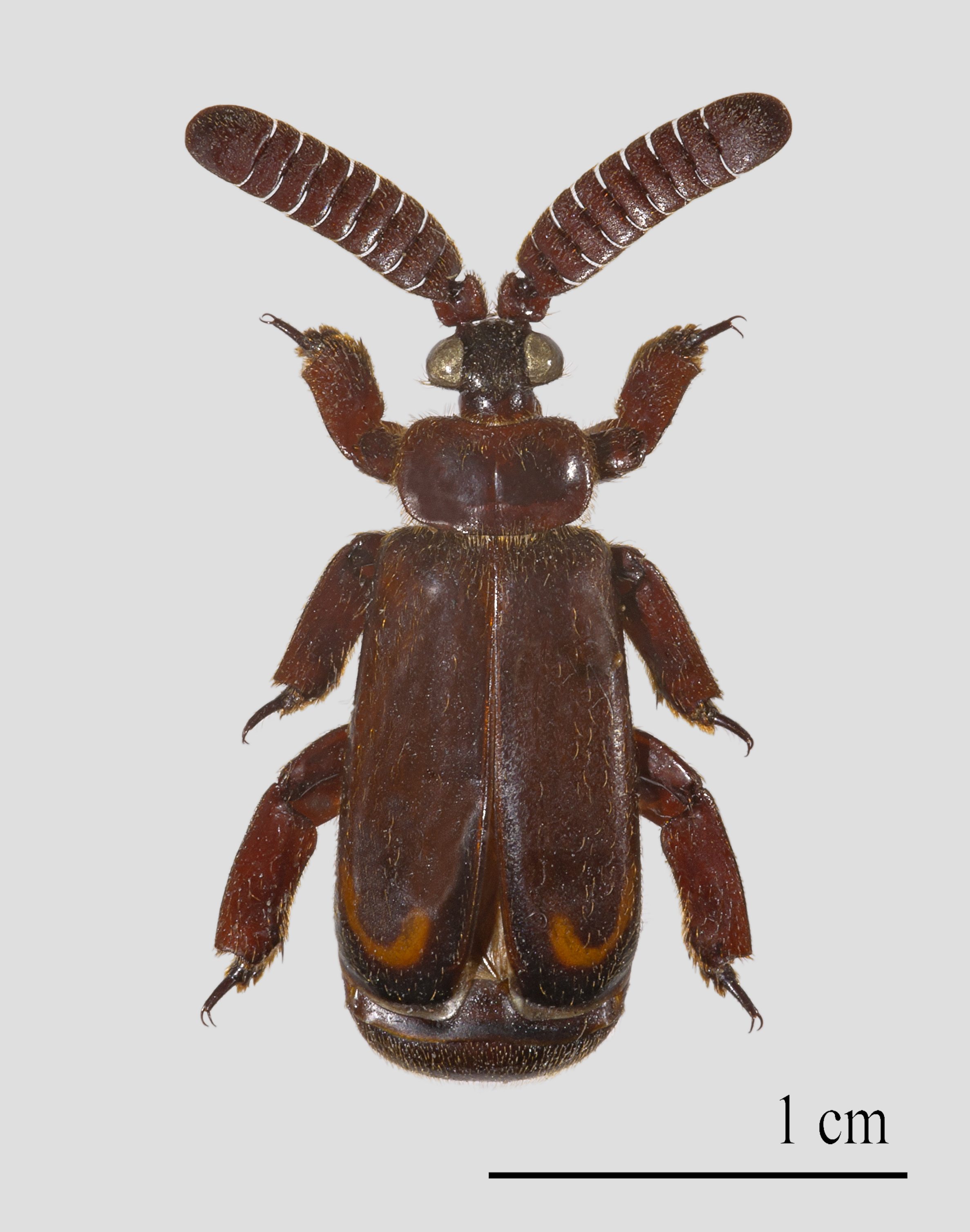
- Cerapterus pilipennis - Muséum de Toulouse

Scientific classification
- Domain: Eukaryota
- Kingdom: Animalia
- Phylum: Arthropoda
- Class: Insecta
- Order: Coleoptera
- Suborder: Adephaga
- Superfamily: Caraboidea
- Family: Carabidae
- Subfamily: Paussinae
- Genus: Cerapterus; Swederus, 1788

= Cerapterus =

Genus of beetles

Cerapterus is a genus in the beetle family Carabidae. There are more than 30 described species in Cerapterus.

== Species ==
These 32 species belong to the genus Cerapterus:

- Cerapterus benguelanus Kolbe, 1926 (Africa)
- Cerapterus brancae Luna de Carvalho, 1961 (Democratic Republic of the Congo)
- Cerapterus burgeoni Reichensperger, 1937 (Democratic Republic of the Congo)
- Cerapterus calaharicus Kolbe, 1926 (Mozambique and Botswana)
- Cerapterus concolor Westwood, 1850 (South Africa)
- Cerapterus denoiti Wasmann, 1899 (Africa)
- Cerapterus drescheri Reichensperger, 1935 (Indonesia)
- Cerapterus elgonis Reichensperger, 1938 (Kenya)
- Cerapterus herrei Schultze, 1923 (Philippines)
- Cerapterus horni Reichensperger, 1925 (Africa)
- Cerapterus horsfieldi Westwood, 1833 (Myanmar and Indonesia)
- Cerapterus hottentottus Kolbe, 1896 (Botswana, Namibia, and South Africa)
- Cerapterus immaculatus Luna de Carvalho, 1975 (South Africa)
- Cerapterus kolbei Lorenz, 1998 (Rwanda and Tanzania)
- Cerapterus laceratus (C.A.Dohrn, 1891) (Africa)
- Cerapterus lafertei Westwood, 1850 (Africa)
- Cerapterus latipes Swederus, 1788 (Sri Lanka, India, and Myanmar)
- Cerapterus leoninus Kolbe, 1926 (Africa)
- Cerapterus longihamus Reichensperger, 1933 (Democratic Republic of the Congo, Zambia, and Malawi)
- Cerapterus longipennis Wasmann, 1899 (Tanzania and South Africa)
- Cerapterus myrmidonum Kolbe, 1896 (Cameroon, Democratic Republic of the Congo, Angola, and South Africa)
- Cerapterus oblitus Reichensperger, 1938 (South Africa)
- Cerapterus parallelus Wasmann, 1922 (Democratic Republic of the Congo and South Africa)
- Cerapterus pilipennis Wasmann, 1922 (Africa)
- Cerapterus pseudoblitus Luna de Carvalho, 1961 (Africa)
- Cerapterus pygmaeus Luna de Carvalho, 1960 (Congo (Brazzaville))
- Cerapterus quadrimaculatus Westwood, 1841 (China, Nepal, Myanmar, Thailand, Malaysia, and Indonesia)
- Cerapterus smithii Westwood, 1838 (Africa)
- Cerapterus splendidus Wasmann, 1918 (Kenya)
- Cerapterus stalii Westwood, 1874 (South Africa)
- Cerapterus stuhlmanni Kolbe, 1895 (Democratic Republic of the Congo, Tanzania, and Angola)
- Cerapterus trinitatis Kolbe, 1896 (Tanzania, Malawi, and South Africa)
