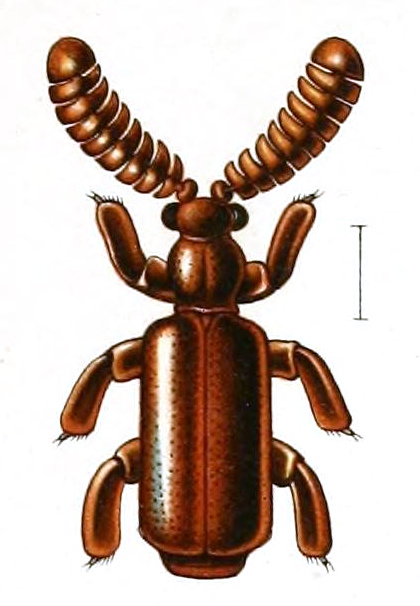
- Homopterus brasiliensis

Scientific classification
- Kingdom: Animalia
- Phylum: Arthropoda
- Class: Insecta
- Order: Coleoptera
- Suborder: Adephaga
- Family: Carabidae
- Subfamily: Paussinae
- Genus: Homopterus; Westwood, 1841

= Homopterus =

Genus of beetles

Homopterus is a genus of beetles in the family Carabidae, containing the following species:

- Homopterus amplificatus Reichensperger, 1938
- Homopterus arrowi Reichensperger, 1938
- Homopterus bolivianus H.Kolbe, 1920
- Homopterus brasiliensis (Westwood, 1838)
- Homopterus cunctans Reichensperger, 1938
- Homopterus honduriensis Darlington, 1937
- Homopterus kriegi Reichensperger, 1938
- Homopterus lunacarvalhoi Martinez & Jimenez-Asua, 1965
- Homopterus martinezi Luna De Carvalho, 1963
- Homopterus proemonens H.Kolbe, 1920
- Homopterus steinbachi H.Kolbe, 1920
- Homopterus subcordatus Darlington, 1950
