= Leleupaussus =

Scientific classification
- Domain: Eukaryota
- Kingdom: Animalia
- Phylum: Arthropoda
- Class: Insecta
- Order: Coleoptera
- Suborder: Adephaga
- Family: Carabidae
- Tribe: Paussini
- Subtribe: Paussina
- Genus: Leleupaussus; Luna de Carvalho, 1962
- Species: L. tetramerus

Binomial name
- Leleupaussus tetramerus Luna de Carvalho, 1962

Genus of beetles

Leleupaussus is a genus in the ground beetle family Carabidae. This genus has a single species, Leleupaussus tetramerus. It is found in Rwanda and South Africa.
