= Eustra shanghaiensis =

Scientific classification
- Kingdom: Animalia
- Phylum: Arthropoda
- Clade: Pancrustacea
- Class: Insecta
- Order: Coleoptera
- Suborder: Adephaga
- Family: Carabidae
- Genus: Eustra
- Species: E. shanghaiensis

Binomial name
- Eustra shanghaiensis Song, Tang, Peng, 2018

Species of beetle

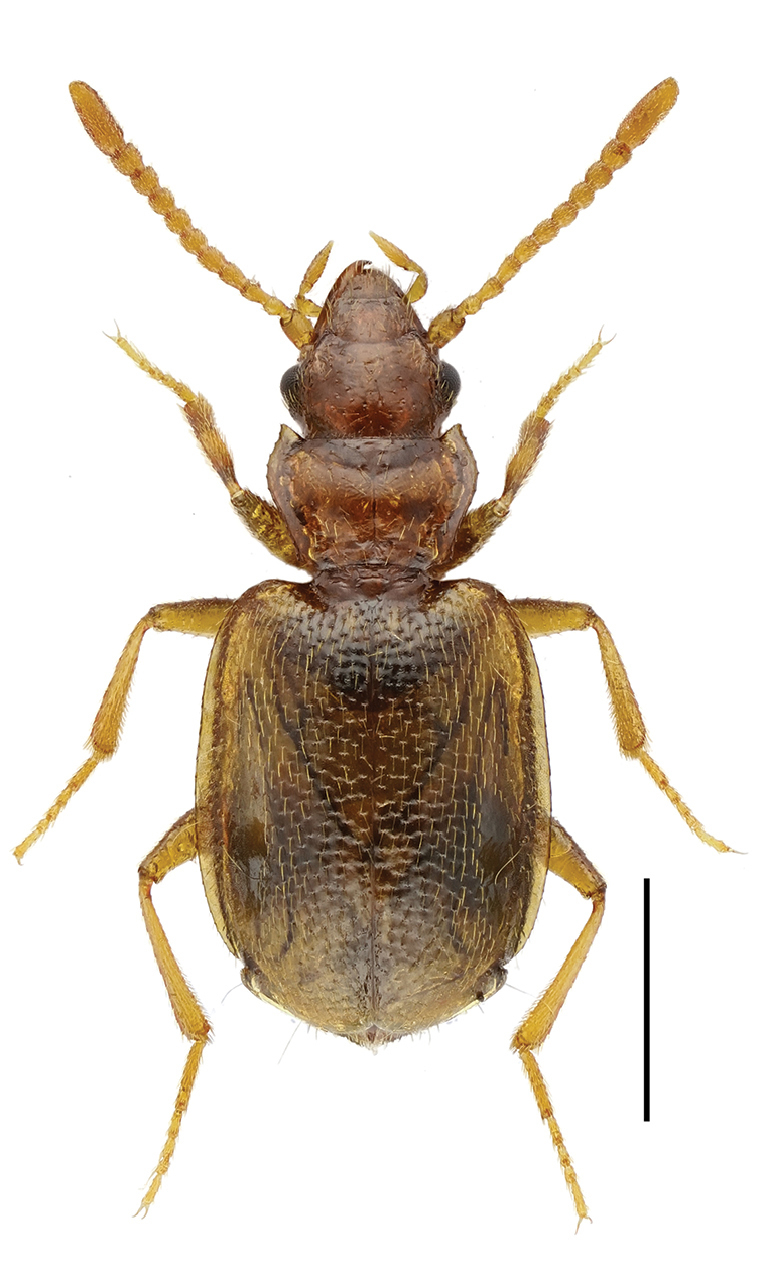
Eustra shanghaiensis.

Eustra shanghaiensis is a species of flanged bombardier beetle belonging to the family Carabidae. It is endemic to China.

== Description ==
Body length is 3.06–3.17 mm. Body yellowish-brown in color. Head and pronotum with reddish tinge. There is a dark spot on each elytron. Head convex and gently covered with yellow setae. Eyes small. Antennae submoniliform. Pronotum sparsely covered with yellow setae. Elytra densely punctulate and pubescent. Hind wings well developed. Male has wide sternite, which is widely truncate.
