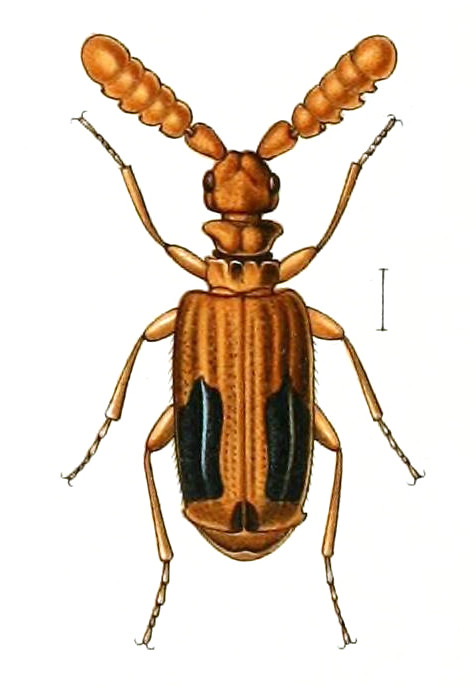
- M. bensoni

Scientific classification
- Kingdom: Animalia
- Phylum: Arthropoda
- Class: Insecta
- Order: Coleoptera
- Suborder: Adephaga
- Family: Carabidae
- Subfamily: Paussinae
- Genus: Melanospilus; Westwood, 1847

Synonyms
- Merismoderus

= Melanospilus =

Genus of beetles

Melanospilus is a genus of flanged-bombardier beetles or paussines in the family Carabidae, containing the following species: The genus is considered to belong to the subtribe Ceratoderina and all members are thought to be myrmecophiles. The ant host Paratrechina longicornis is known for M. bensoni.

- Melanospilus andrewesi (Desneux, 1905) (Sri Lanka and India)
- Melanospilus bensoni Westwood, 1847 (Pakistan and India)
- Melanospilus borneensis (Reichensperger, 1938) (Indonesia and Borneo)
- Melanospilus chitwanensis Nagel, 2018 (Nepal)
- Melanospilus hamaticornis (van de Poll, 1890) (Indonesia)
- Melanospilus yamasakoi (Maruyama, 2009) (China and Laos)
