= Microzaena =

Scientific classification
- Kingdom: Animalia
- Phylum: Arthropoda
- Class: Insecta
- Order: Coleoptera
- Suborder: Adephaga
- Family: Carabidae
- Tribe: Ozaenini
- Genus: Microzaena; Fairmaire, 1901

Genus of beetles

Microzaena is a genus of beetles in the family Carabidae, containing the following species:

- Microzaena angustior Alluaud, 1935
- Microzaena chrysomeloides Basilewsky, 1979
- Microzaena levis Alluaud, 1935
- Microzaena madecassa Fairmaire, 1901
