= Goniotropis =

Scientific classification
- Kingdom: Animalia
- Phylum: Arthropoda
- Class: Insecta
- Order: Coleoptera
- Suborder: Adephaga
- Family: Carabidae
- Tribe: Ozaenini
- Genus: Goniotropis; Gray, 1831

Genus of beetles

Goniotropis is a genus of ground beetles in the family Carabidae. There are at least 40 described species in Goniotropis.

== Species ==
These 40 species belong to the genus Goniotropis:

- Goniotropis angulicollis (Schaum, 1863)
- Goniotropis balli Deuve, 2005
- Goniotropis barclayi Deuve, 2005
- Goniotropis batesii (Chaudoir, 1868)
- Goniotropis boweni Deuve, 2009
- Goniotropis brasiliensis Gray, 1831
- Goniotropis brulei Deuve, 2011
- Goniotropis cartagoensis Deuve, 2004
- Goniotropis cayennensis Bänninger, 1949
- Goniotropis claritarsalis Deuve, 2005
- Goniotropis cotopaxiensis Deuve, 2005
- Goniotropis decellei Deuve, 2005
- Goniotropis ecuadorensis Deuve, 2005
- Goniotropis elongata (Chaudoir, 1854)
- Goniotropis escalonai Deuve, 2009
- Goniotropis guyanensis Deuve, 2005
- Goniotropis kuntzeni Bänninger, 1927
- Goniotropis morio (Klug, 1834)
- Goniotropis napoensis (Deuve, 2001)
- Goniotropis navattae Deuve, 2005
- Goniotropis nicaraguensis (Bates, 1891)
- Goniotropis olivieri (Chaudoir, 1868)
- Goniotropis omodon (Chaudoir, 1868)
- Goniotropis parca (LeConte, 1884)
- Goniotropis ratcliffei Deuve, 2009
- Goniotropis regina Deuve, 2009
- Goniotropis rogerii (Dejean, 1825)
- Goniotropis rondoniaensis Deuve, 2009
- Goniotropis roubaudi Deuve, 2004
- Goniotropis seagi Deuve, 2011
- Goniotropis seriatoporoides Deuve, 2004
- Goniotropis seriatoporus (Chaudoir, 1868)
- Goniotropis setifer (Bates, 1874)
- Goniotropis simplicicollis Deuve, 2007
- Goniotropis steineri Deuve, 2009
- Goniotropis tarsalis Bänninger, 1927
- Goniotropis taylorae Deuve, 2005
- Goniotropis telesfordi (Deuve, 2001)
- Goniotropis tiputinica Deuve, 2007
- Goniotropis toulgoeti Deuve, 2005
