= Pachyteles gyllenhalii =

Scientific classification
- Kingdom: Animalia
- Phylum: Arthropoda
- Class: Insecta
- Order: Coleoptera
- Suborder: Adephaga
- Family: Carabidae
- Genus: Pachyteles
- Species: P. gyllenhalii

Binomial name
- Pachyteles gyllenhalii (Dejean, 1825)

Synonyms
- Pachyteles testacea G. Horn, 1868

Species of beetle

Pachyteles gyllenhalii is a species of ground beetle in the family Carabidae. It is found in North America.
