= Hibiscus hastatus =

Hibiscus hastatus is a taxon synonym for several species of flowering plants:

- Hibiscus hastatus Cav., synonym of Kosteletzkya depressa (L.) O.J.Blanch., Fryxell & D.M.Bates
- Hibiscus hastatus L.f., synonym of Hibiscus tiliaceus subsp. tiliaceus
- Hibiscus hastatus Michx., synonym of Hibiscus laevis All.
