= Entomoantyx =

Scientific classification
- Domain: Eukaryota
- Kingdom: Animalia
- Phylum: Arthropoda
- Class: Insecta
- Order: Coleoptera
- Suborder: Adephaga
- Family: Carabidae
- Genus: Entomoantyx; Ball & McCleve, 1990
- Species: E. cyanipennis

Binomial name
- Entomoantyx cyanipennis (Chaudoir, 1852)

Genus of beetles

Entomoantyx cyanipennis is a species of beetle in the family Carabidae, the only species in the genus Entomoantyx.
