= Dhanya (beetle) =

Scientific classification
- Domain: Eukaryota
- Kingdom: Animalia
- Phylum: Arthropoda
- Class: Insecta
- Order: Coleoptera
- Suborder: Adephaga
- Superfamily: Caraboidea
- Family: Carabidae
- Subfamily: Paussinae
- Genus: Dhanya; Andrewes, 1919

Genus of beetles

Dhanya is a genus of in the beetle family Carabidae. There are about seven described species in Dhanya.

== Species ==
These seven species belong to the genus Dhanya:

- Dhanya andrewesi Stork, 1985 (India)
- Dhanya bioculata Andrewes, 1919 (Nepal, India, Myanmar, Vietnam, Indonesia, Borneo, and Philippines)
- Dhanya brancuccii Deuve, 2007
- Dhanya cylindrella Stork, 1985 (Philippines)
- Dhanya mulu Stork, 1985 (Malaysia)
- Dhanya parallela Andrewes, 1919 (Indonesia and Borneo)
- Dhanya seminigra Andrewes, 1929 (Indonesia)
