= Crepidozaena =

Scientific classification
- Domain: Eukaryota
- Kingdom: Animalia
- Phylum: Arthropoda
- Class: Insecta
- Order: Coleoptera
- Suborder: Adephaga
- Family: Carabidae
- Genus: Crepidozaena; Deuve, 2001
- Species: C. gracilis

Binomial name
- Crepidozaena gracilis (Chaudoir, 1868)

Genus of beetles

Crepidozaena gracilis is a species of beetle in the family Carabidae, the only species in the genus Crepidozaena.
