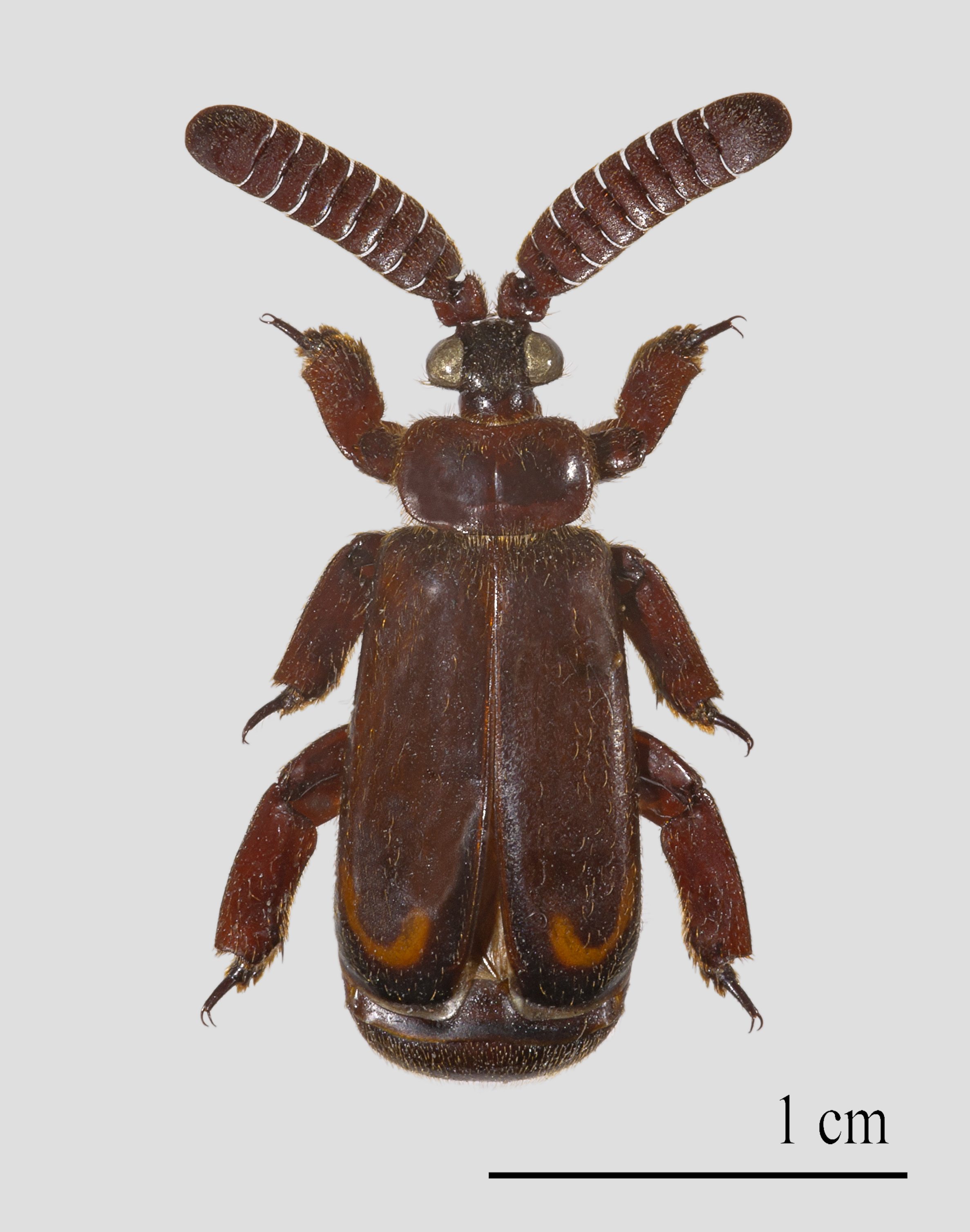
- Cerapterus pilipennis (Paussini : Cerapterina)

Scientific classification
- Kingdom: Animalia
- Phylum: Arthropoda
- Class: Insecta
- Order: Coleoptera
- Suborder: Adephaga
- Family: Carabidae
- Subfamily: Paussinae; Latreille, 1807

Tribes
- Metriini LeConte, 1853; Ozaenini Hope 1838; Paussini Latreille, 1807; Protopaussini Gestro, 1892

= Ant nest beetle =

Ant nest beetles Temporal range: Cenomanian–Recent

Subfamily of beetles

Ant nest beetles (subfamily Paussinae) or paussines, some members of which are known also as flanged bombardier beetles, are a large subfamily within the ground beetles (Carabidae).The tribes Metriini, Ozaenini, Paussini and Protopaussini are included in the subfamily.

Rarely seen in the open, except at lights, most Paussinae are obligate or facultative myrmecophiles, living within the nests of ants, predatory on ant larvae and workers. Many have elaborate antennal structures and body parts flattened. Paussines are moderate sized (6–20 mm), characterised by glandular hairs that produce secretions attractive to ants and by the odd antennal structures of many species. Their pygidial glands can produce explosive secretions, with a spray of quinones that are directed forward by flanges at the posterior end of the elytra, giving them the other name of flanged bombardier beetles although they are not particularly close relatives of the typical bombardier beetles (Brachininae).

== Biology ==
Very little is known about the immature stages of ant nest beetles. Most appear to live in ant nests in their early stages of life. Although many are facultative or obligate myrmecophiles, most do not appear like ants (i.e. myrmecomorphic) and unlike in the case of myrmecophilous larval Lycaenidae, there appears to be no benefit gained by the ants in this association. Many species follow the trails of worker ants of specific species. Glandular secretions on their antennae and body allow them to interact with ant workers. It is believed that the beetles use an acoustic mechanism to successfully imitate the sounds of an ant queen thus permitting them access to the nest without alarming the ants. Worker ants groom the beetles. Adult Paussus favieri have been observed to antennate and interact by stridulation with the queen of Pheidole pallidula in the brood chamber. The defensive bombardier behaviour is never used against ants. Unlike bombardier beetles in the family Brachininae, which have two glands opening close together on the abdomen, the glands are located close to the lateral margins and lie under a flange formed by the tip of the elytra. The flange is curved and the explosive hot spray of quinones is directed forward by Coandă effect. The flange is not present in members of the tribe Metriini but is replaced by similar internal structures. Males of some species are attracted to lights during some parts of the season and are thought to disperse from one ant nest to another. Males are thought to be short-lived. These beetles feed on ant eggs, larvae and adults by piercing their mandibles into the abdomen or other soft part and sucking the contents. Apart from chemical mimicry and communication with their hosts, they also make use of vibrations. Several stridulatory structures are found in these beetles including alary-elytral, abdomen-femur and thorax-femur combinations of surfaces. Larvae of only about 10 species have ever been examined. The first instar larvae of Paussus favieri has a terminal disc which is raised at times and bent back over the head. They also exhibit some behaviours and mouth part adaptations which may be involved in eliciting trophallaxis by the ant hosts but this has not been confirmed. They opportunistically feed on the haemolymph of ant larvae.

== Systematics ==
The subfamily Paussinae contains 54 genera, with over 800 species divided into the following tribes and subtribes:

While some tribes like Metriini and Ozaenini appear quite similar to typical carabids, others have modified antennae and body shapes. The Protopaussini and Paussini are slender or compact in body shape with enlarged antennae in the Paussini.

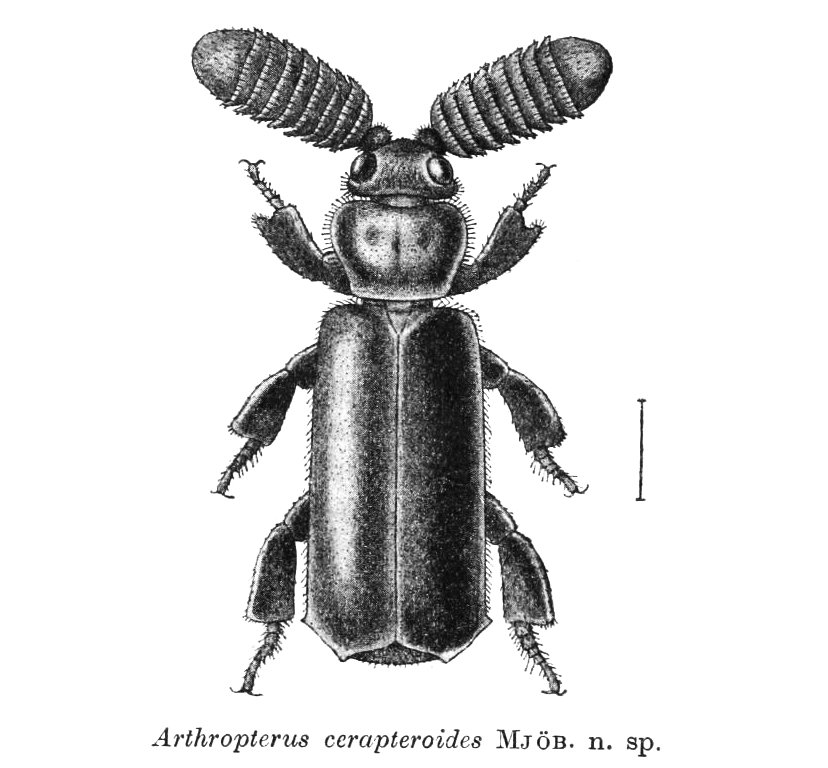
Arthropterus cerapteroides (Paussini: Cerapterina)

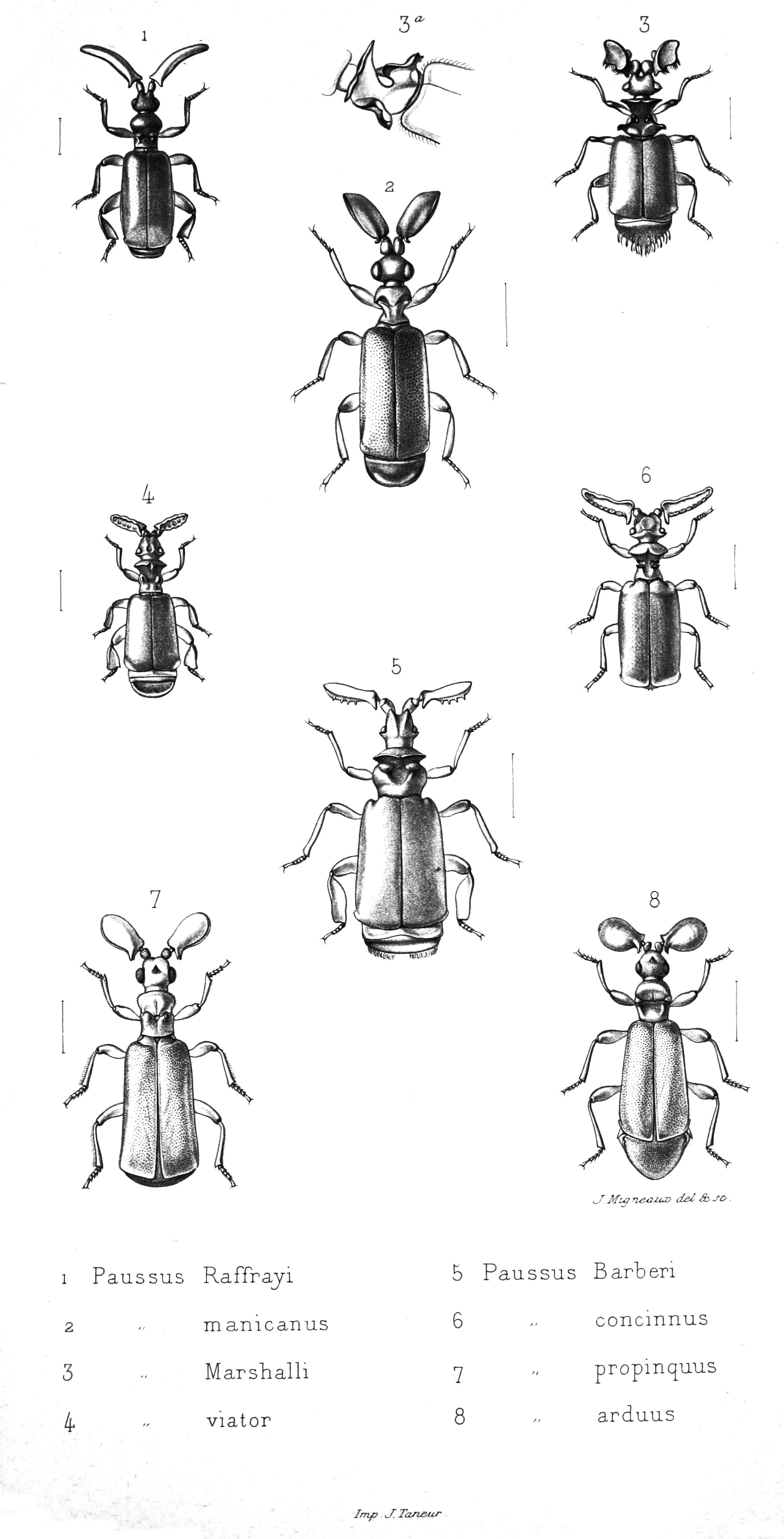
Paussina species from South Africa

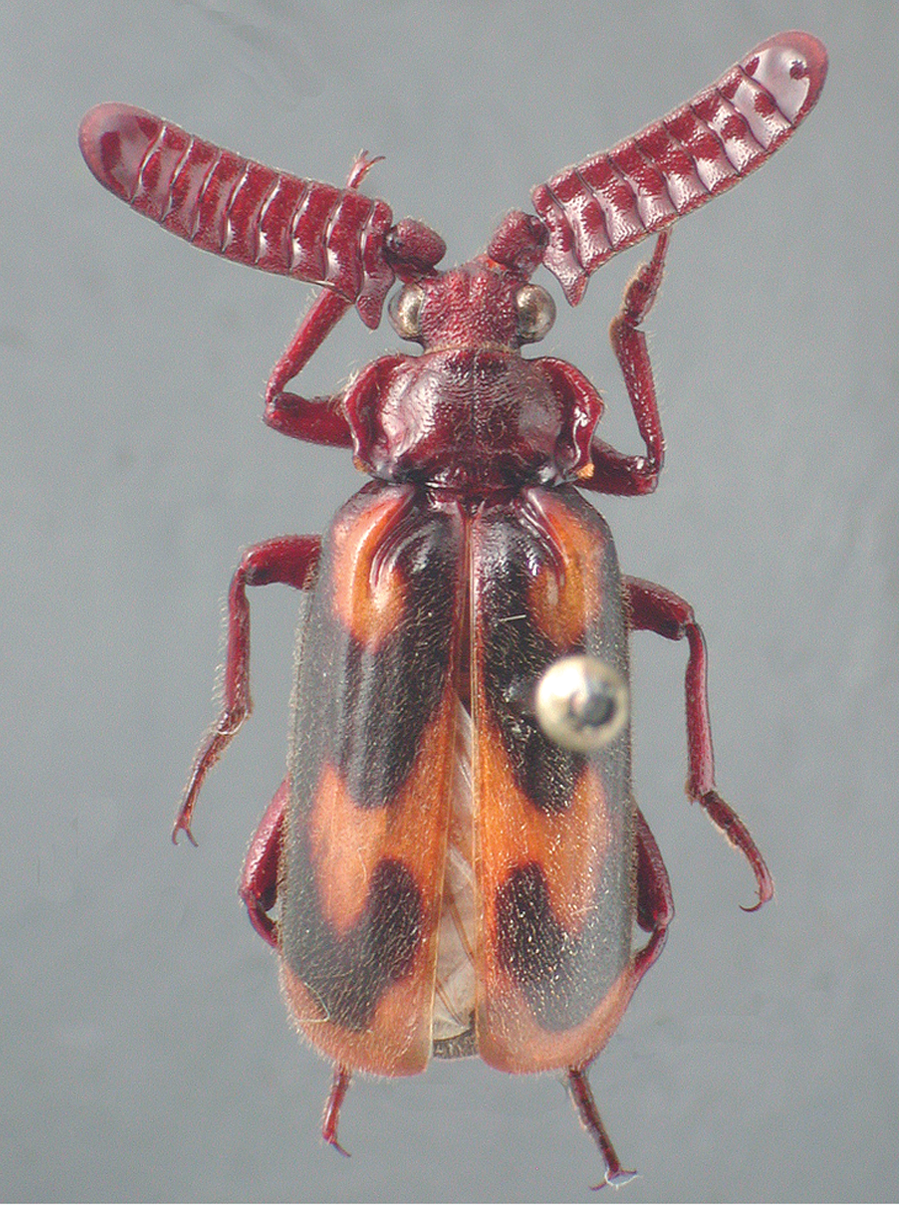
Heteropaussus hastatus (Paussini: Heteropaussina)

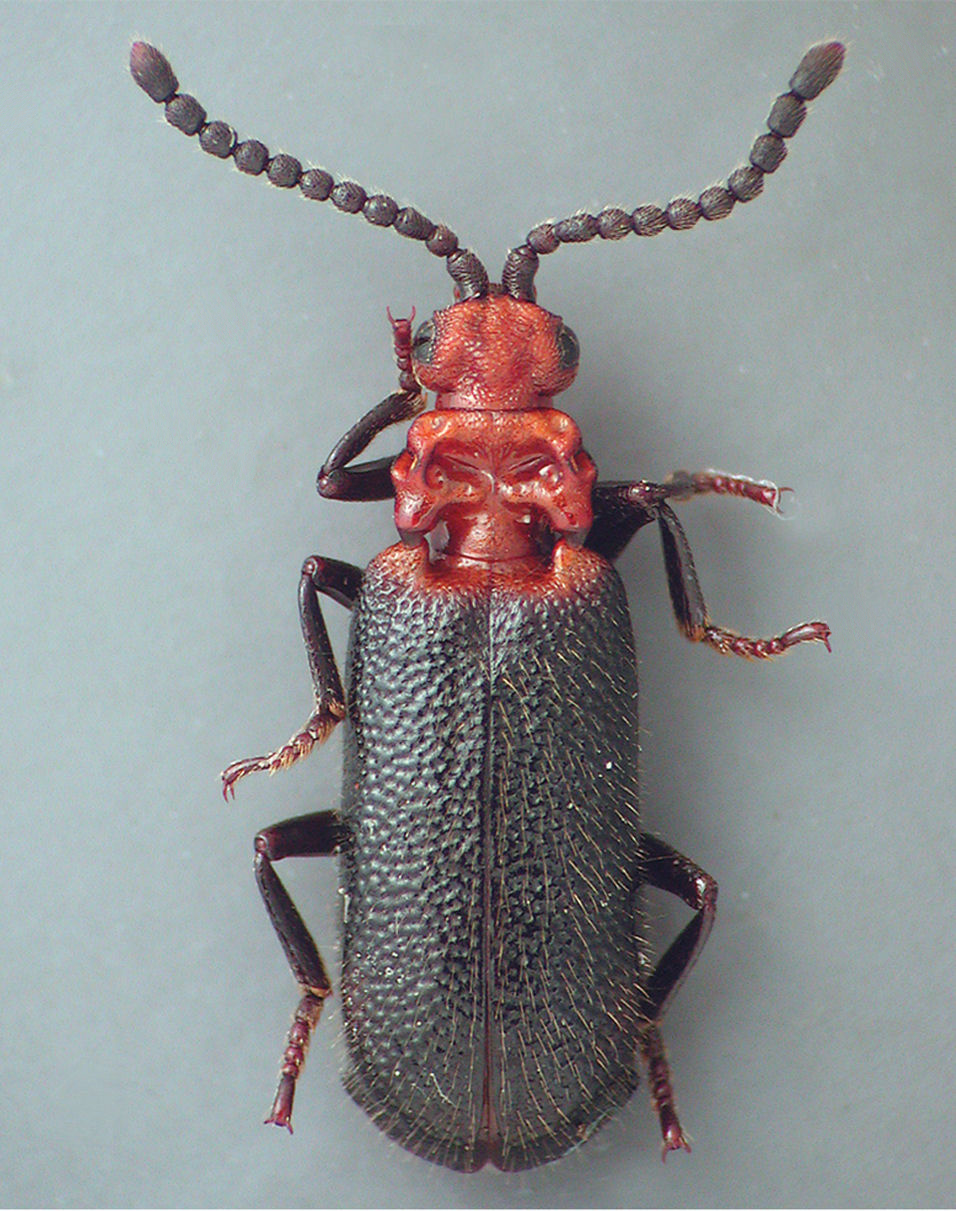
Protopaussus sp.

These four tribes belong to the subfamily Paussinae:

Metriini LeConte, 1853
Subtribe †Kryzhanovskianina Deuve, 2019
Ozaenini Hope, 1838
Subtribe Microzaenina Deuve, 2019
Subtribe Mystropomina G.Horn, 1881
Subtribe Ozaenina Hope, 1838
Subtribe Pseudozaenina Sloane, 1905
Paussini Latreille, 1806
Subtribe Carabidomemnina Wasmann, 1928
Subtribe Cerapterina Billberg, 1820
Subtribe Heteropaussina Janssens, 1950
Subtribe Homopterina Wasmann, 1920
Subtribe Paussina Latreille, 1806
Subtribe Pentaplatarthrina Jeannel, 1946
Subtribe †Arthropteritina Luna de Carvalho, 1961
Subtribe †Eopaussina Luna de Carvalho, 1951
Protopaussini Gestro, 1892
