= Lomboy =

Lomboy may refer to:

- Lomboy wine, a Filipino fruit wine
- Artemio Lomboy Rillera (1947-2011), Filipino Roman Catholic bishop
- Glenda Kapstein Lomboy (1939-2008), Chilean architect
