= Bahadoli =

Village in Maharashtra, India

- Village
- Location in Maharashtra, India Bahadoli (India)
- Coordinates: 19.66°N 72.88°E
- Country: India
- State: Maharashtra
- District: Palghar district
- Taluka: Palghar

Languages
  - Official: Marathi
- Time zone: UTC+5:30 (IST)
- PIN: 401404

Bahadoli is a village in the Palghar taluka of Palghar district located in Maharashtra State, India.

== Bahadoli Jamun Cultivation ==
The Bahadoli Jamun tree holds heritage status in Bahadoli village, known for its unique fruits characterized by large size, oblong shape, dark purple color, and a sweet-sour taste. Rich in anthocyanin, a natural food colorant, Bahadoli Jamun is also valued for its medicinal properties, particularly in managing diabetes. The tree's various parts, including seeds, bark, leaves, flowers, and fruit pulp, are utilized in traditional medicine and for producing by-products like juice, wine, and beverages, making it a significant contributor to the local economy and tradition.

Konkan Bahadoli is a distinct variety of jamun developed by Dr. Balasaheb Sawant Konkan Krishi Vidyapeeth (DBSKKV), Dapoli. This variety was carefully selected from local jamun trees in Bahadoli. Notable characteristics of Konkan Bahadoli include its heavy and cluster-bearing habits, producing fruits that weigh 25-28 grams, have small seeds, and a high pulp content of 83.3%. It's superior table and processing qualities make it a valuable variety.

== Geographical indication ==
Bahadoli Jamun was awarded the Geographical Indication (GI) status tag from the Geographical Indications Registry under the Union Government of India on 30 March 2024 (valid until 28 August 2032).

"Bahadoli Jambhul Utpadak Shetkari Gat" headed by Jagdish Patil from Bahadoli village proposed the GI registration of Bahadoli Jamun. After filing the application in August 2022, the Jamun was granted the GI tag in 2024 by the Geographical Indication Registry in Chennai, making the name "Bahadoli Jamun" exclusive to the Jamuns grown in the region. It became the 2nd Jamun variety from India after Badlapur Jamun and the 48th type of goods from Maharashtra to earn the GI tag.
