= Bahadoli Jamun =

Jamun variety grown in Maharashtra, India

Bahadoli Jamun (बहाडोली जांभूळ)
- Geographical indication
- Alternative names: Bahadoli Jambhul
- Description: Jamun variety grown in Maharashtra, India
- Type: Jamun
- Area: Bahadoli
- Country: India
- Registered: 31 March 2024
- Official website: ipindia.gov.in

The Bahadoli Jamun refers to the traditional variety of the jamun fruit (Syzygium cumini) grown in the Indian state of Maharashtra. Bahadoli Jamun is grown in abundance in the Bahadoli village of Palghar district.

Under its Geographical Indication tag, it is referred to as "Bahadoli Jamun". The fruit is known by other names, including Black plum, Indian blackberry, and Malabar plum.

== Name ==
The name "Bahadoli" refers to its main region of cultivation i.e the village of Bahadoli which is around 87 km from Mumbai. Locally in the state language of Marathi, it is locally known as Bahadoli Jambhul. In fact, the village is called Jambulgaon (Village of Jamuns).

== Description ==
The Bahadoli Jamun tree holds heritage status in Bahadoli village, known for its unique fruits characterized by large size, oblong shape, dark purple color, and a sweet-sour taste. Rich in anthocyanin, a natural food colorant, Bahadoli Jamun is also valued for its medicinal properties, particularly in managing diabetes. The tree's various parts, including seeds, bark, leaves, flowers, and fruit pulp, are utilized in traditional medicine and for producing by-products like juice, wine, and beverages, making it a significant contributor to the local economy and tradition.

Konkan Bahadoli is a distinct variety of jamun developed by Dr. Balasaheb Sawant Konkan Krishi Vidyapeeth (DBSKKV), Dapoli. This variety was carefully selected from local jamun trees in Bahadoli. Notable characteristics of Konkan Bahadoli include its heavy and cluster-bearing habits, producing bold fruits that weigh 25-28 grams, have small seeds, and a high pulp content of 83.3%. Its superior table and processing qualities make it a valuable variety.

== Geographical indication ==
It was awarded the Geographical Indication (GI) status tag from the Geographical Indications Registry under the Union Government of India on 30 March 2024 (valid until 28 August 2032).

Bahadoli Jambhul Utpadak Shetkari Gat headed by Jagdish Patil from Bahadoli village proposed the GI registration of Bahadoli Jamun. After filing the application August 2022, the Jamun was granted the GI tag in 2024 by the Geographical Indication Registry in Chennai, making the name "Bahadoli Jamun" exclusive to the Jamuns grown in the region. It thus became the 2nd Jamun variety from India after Badlapur Jamun and the 48th type of goods from Maharashtra to earn the GI tag.

== See also ==
- Badlapur Jamun
