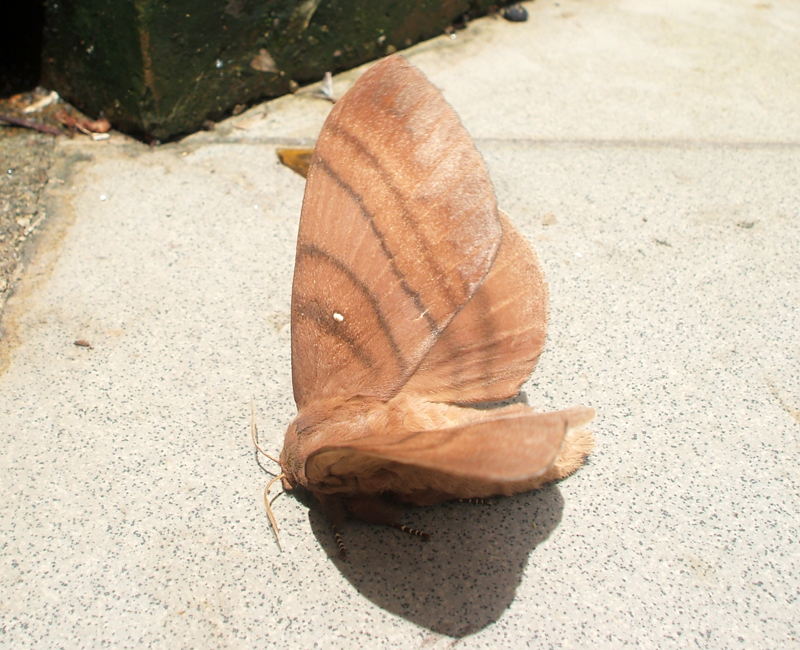

Scientific classification
- Kingdom: Animalia
- Phylum: Arthropoda
- Class: Insecta
- Order: Lepidoptera
- Family: Lasiocampidae
- Genus: Kunugia
- Species: K. latipennis

Binomial name
- Kunugia latipennis Walker, 1855

Synonyms
- Chatra grisea Moore, 1879; Lebeda variegata Moore, 1877; Lebeda vulpina Moore, 1879; Lebeda latipennis Walker, 1855; Megasoma basimacula Walker, 1862; Metanastria sumatrae Swinhoe, 1916; Cyclophragma basidiscata Holloway, 1982; Lebeda purpurascens Moore, 1884; Cyclophragma dongchuaensis Tsai & Hou, 1983

= Kunugia latipennis =

Species of moth

Kunugia latipennis, the pine lappet moth, is a moth of the family Lasiocampidae. The species was first described by Francis Walker in 1855.

== Distribution ==
It is found in the Indian subregion, Sri Lanka, Thailand, Vietnam, Myanmar, Sumatra, Borneo and Palawan.

== Biology ==
The caterpillar is a major pest on pines. An outbreak of pine lappet moths was observed in the mid-altitude hills of Meghalaya, India, during May and June 2011. It is known to attack Pinus kesiya, Cupressus, Eucalyptus camaldulensis, Litchi chinensis, Mangifera indica, Mesua ferrea, Pinus elliottii, Pinus markusii, Shorea robusta, Syzygium cumini and Woodfordia fruticosa.
