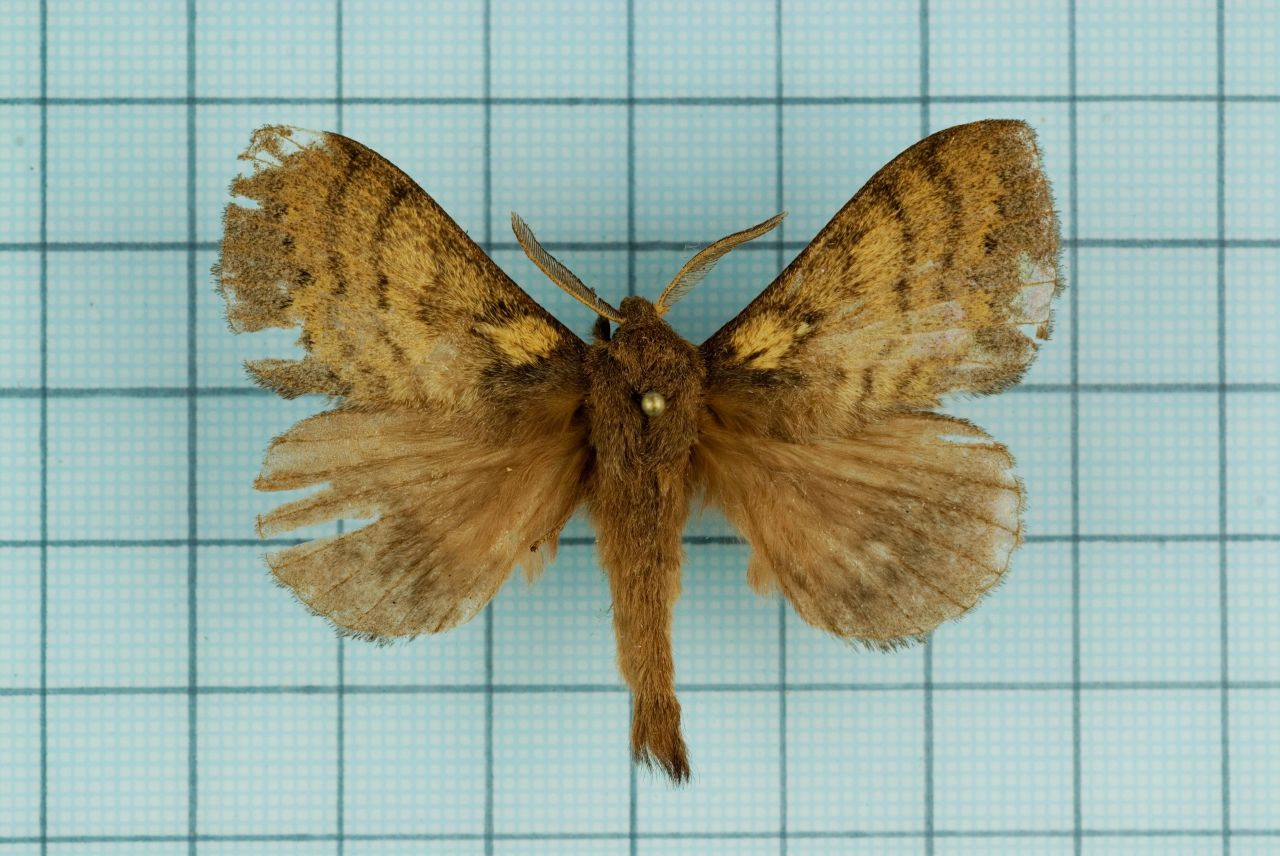

Scientific classification
- Kingdom: Animalia
- Phylum: Arthropoda
- Class: Insecta
- Order: Lepidoptera
- Family: Lasiocampidae
- Genus: Kunugia
- Species: K. undans

Binomial name
- Kunugia undans (Walker, 1855)

Synonyms
- Lebeda undans Walker, 1855; Dendrolimus metanastroides Strand, 1915; Metanastria chosenicola Bryk, 1948; Odonestis unicolor Oberthür, 1880; Bombyx fasciatella Ménétriés, 1858; Bombyx flaveola Motschulsky, 1866; Cyclophragma shensiensis De Lajonquiére, 1973; Dendrolimus iwasakii Nagano, 1917

= Kunugia undans =

Species of moth

Kunugia undans is a species of moth in the family Lasiocampidae. It is found in Russia, Japan, China, Taiwan, Vietnam, South Korea, Bhutan.

The wingspan is 58–105 mm. Adults are on wing in September in Taiwan.

The larvae feed on Ardisia sieboldii and Barringtonia racemosa.

== Subspecies ==
- Kunugia undans undans
- Kunugia undans metanastroides (Strand, 1915) (Taiwan)
- Kunugia undans shensiensis (De Lajonquiére, 1973) (China)
- Kunugia undans chosenicola (Bryk, 1948) (Korea)
- Kunugia undans iwasakii (Nagano, 1917) (Japan)
- Kunugia undans fasciatella (Ménétriés, 1858) (Russia)
- Kunugia undans flaveola (Motschulsky, 1866) (Japan)
