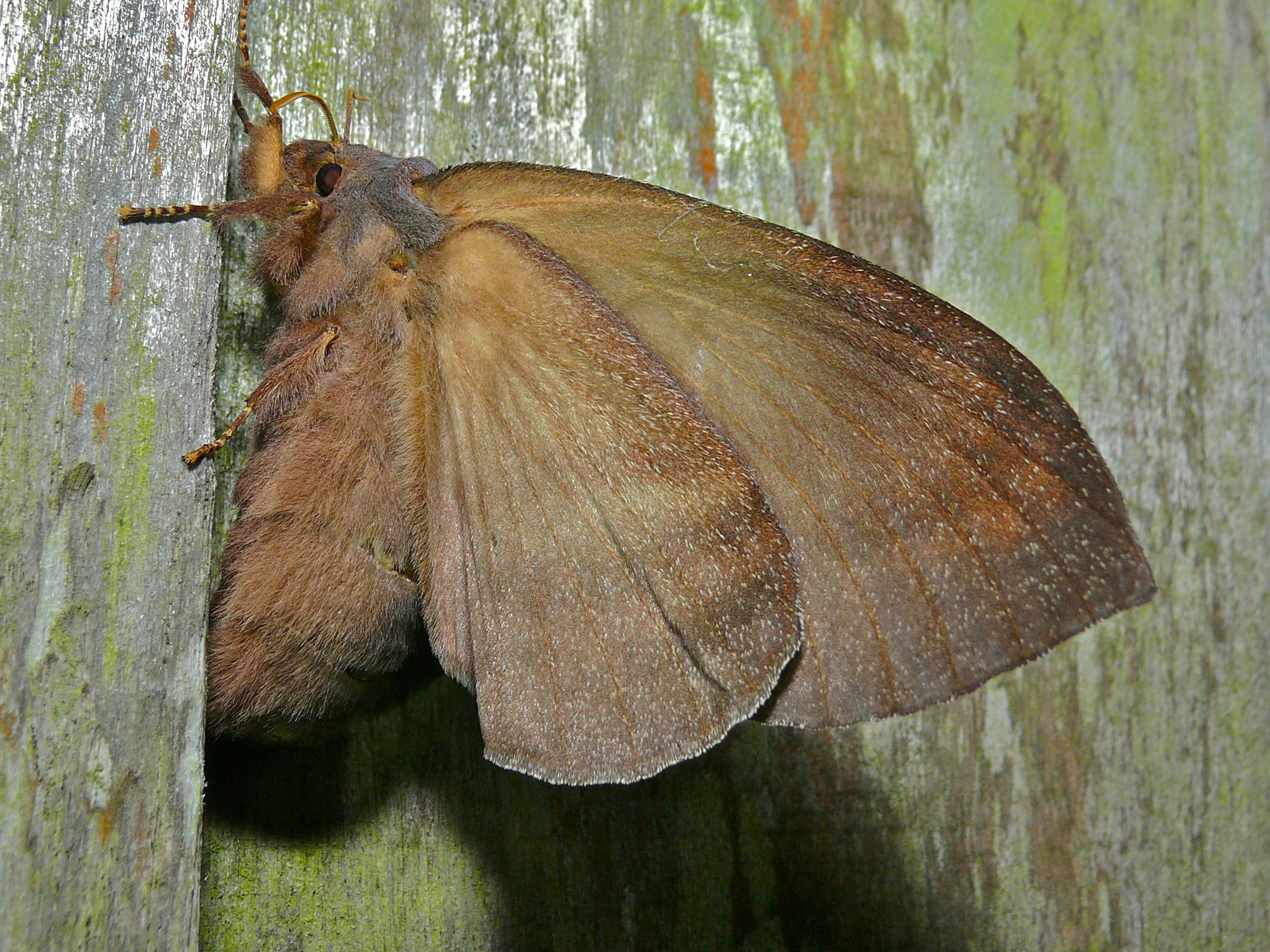
- Kunugia latipennis

Scientific classification
- Domain: Eukaryota
- Kingdom: Animalia
- Phylum: Arthropoda
- Class: Insecta
- Order: Lepidoptera
- Family: Lasiocampidae
- Genus: Kunugia; Nagano, 1917

= Kunugia =

Genus of moths

Kunugia is a genus of moths in the family Lasiocampidae described by Kikujiro Nagano in 1917.

== Selected species ==
- Kunugia ampla (Walker, 1855)
- Kunugia austroplacida Holloway, 1987
- Kunugia basinigra (Roepke, 1953)
- Kunugia brunnea (Wileman, 1915)
- Kunugia burmensis Gaede, 1932
- Kunugia celebica Zolotuhin & J.D. Holloway, 2006
- Kunugia dendrolimoides Zolotuhin, Treadaway & Witt, 1998
- Kunugia divaricata (Moore, 1884)
- Kunugia dora C. Swinhoe, 1893
- Kunugia drakei Holloway, 1987
- Kunugia fae Zolotuhin, Treadaway & Witt, 1998
- Kunugia falco Zolotuhin, 2002
- Kunugia ferox Holloway, 1987
- Kunugia florimaculata (Tsai & Hou, 1983)
- Kunugia fulgens Moore, 1879
- Kunugia grjukovae Zolotuhin, 2005
- Kunugia gynandra (C. Swinhoe, 1893)
- Kunugia hollowayi Zolotuhin, Treadaway & Witt, 1998
- Kunugia imeldae Zolotuhin, Treadaway & Witt, 1998
- Kunugia labahingra Zolotuhin & S. Ihle, 2008
- Kunugia latipennis (Walker, 1855)
- Kunugia lemeepauli (Lemée & Tams, 1950)
- Kunugia lineata (Moore, 1879)
- Kunugia magellani (De Lajonquière, 1978)
- Kunugia mediacolorata Zolotuhin & Witt, 2000
- Kunugia mervillei Zolotuhin, Treadaway & Witt, 1998
  - Kunugia mervillei bulagaw Zolotuhin, Treadaway & Witt, 1998
  - Kunugia mervillei noeli Zolotuhin, Treadaway & Witt, 1998
- Kunugia pippae Zolotuhin, Treadaway & Witt, 1998
  - Kunugia pippae tagubodica Zolotuhin, Treadaway & Witt, 1998
- Kunugia placida (Moore, 1879)
- Kunugia quadrilineata Holloway, 1987
- Kunugia rectifascia (Holloway, 1976)
- Kunugia siamka Zolotuhin, 2002
- Kunugia sinjaevi Zolotuhin & Witt, 2000
- Kunugia tamsi De Lajonquière, 1973
- Kunugia undans Walker, 1855
- Kunugia varuna Zolotuhin & J.D. Holloway, 2006
- Kunugia victoriae S. Ihle, 2006
- Kunugia vulpina Moore, 1879
- Kunugia wotteni Zolotuhin, 2005
- Kunugia xichangensis (Tsai & Liu, 1962)
- Kunugia yamadai Nagano, 1917
