= Glenda Kapstein Lomboy =

- Education: University of Valparaíso
- Occupation: Architect
- Awards: PLEA Lifetime Achievement Award
- Practice: Pontifical Catholic University of Chile

Glenda Inés Kapstein Lomboy (1939–2008) is a Chilean architect who won the 2003 PLEA Lifetime Achievement Awards for "sustainable architecture and urban design."

== Life ==
Glenda Inés Kapstein was born in Chile in 1939 and grew up in El Quisco in the Valparaíso Region. She was inspired at an early age by the project of Cantalao. She entered the University of Valparaíso in 1959 to study architecture. In 1961 and 1962, she traveled with a group of students to study in Europe, and then in 1963 participated in the Seventh Congress of the International Union of Architects (UIA) held in Havana. She returned to Chile and was highly influenced by her studies with professor Guillermo Ulriksen concerning cultural heritage and the anthropological value of architectural styles. She graduated in 1967, receiving her degree, and almost immediately left for Spain to work with Antonio and José Camuñas on a housing project in Madrid. The father and son team had been hired to complete some 3,300 houses in an extensive complex called Conjunto Virgen de la Esperanza.

She returned to Chile in 1980 to accept a position as the Regional Director of Tourism in Antofagasta and in 1982, she began teaching at the Catholic University of the North (Spanish: Universidad Católica del Norte) (UCN). In 1985, Kapstein left the Tourism Department, to focus on establishing the school of architecture at UCN and a laboratory for study. She was particularly interested in exploring architecture in the desert, how it becomes part of the landscape, how extremes in climate dictate what types of architecture prevail, and how the architectural style of any given place reflects the inhabitants. During 1994, Kapstein completed her Master's of Architecture at Pontifical Catholic University of Chile, where she developed a thesis Arquitectura de un lugar para la palabra en San Pedro de Atacama (Architecture which speaks of a place in San Pedro de Atacama) under the guidance of Juan Ignacio Baixas.

Kapstein became known for her eco-friendly designs which utilized sustainable methods including solar energy, natural lighting, and airflow models. Her work was featured in numerous international events and publications including XIX UIA Congress in Barcelona in 1996; publication in the magazine Casabella 650 in 1997; inclusion in the book Surface Edge-Architecture on the Pacific Rim by Peter Zellner published in 1998 by Thames and Hudson; in the book 10x10 published by Phaidon in 2000. In 2003, she was awarded the PLEA Lifetime Achievement Awards for urban design and sustainable architecture.

Many of her works can be found in Antofagasta. Kapstein died in 2008.

== Bibliography ==
- Bodart, Magali; Evrard, Arnaud (1 July 2011). Architecture & Sustainable Development (vol.1): 27th International Conference on Passive and Low Energy Architecture. Louvain-la-Neuve, Belgium: Presses universitaires de Louvain. ISBN 978-2-87463-276-1.
- Galeno Ibaceta, Claudio (November 2009). "Glenda Kapstein (1939-2008): Articulaciones entre territorio y cuerpo". Revista AOA (in Spanish). Santiago, Chile: Asociación de Oficinas de Arquitectos.
- Hasanovic, Aisha (2006). 2000 Architects. Images Publishing. p. 250. ISBN 978-1-920744-93-9.
