= Duhat wine =

Filipino fruit wine

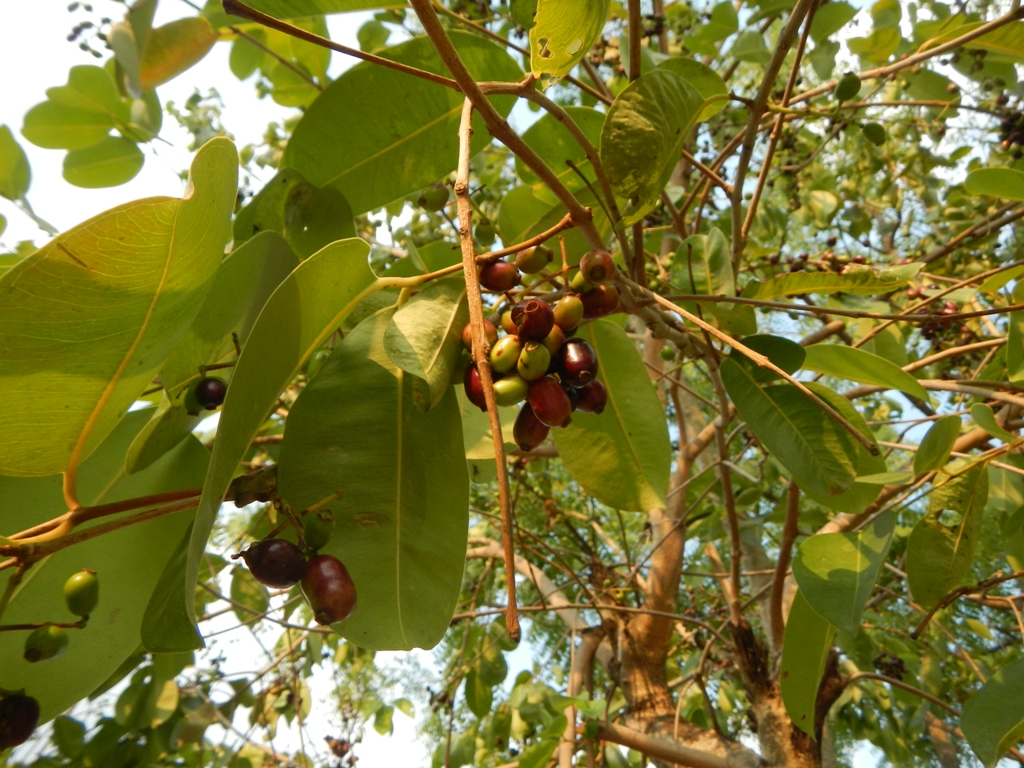
- Black plum (duhat) tree from the Philippines
- Type: Fruit wine
- Origin: Philippines, Southern Luzon
- Alcohol by volume: 12-13%
- Ingredients: Duhat

Duhat wine, also called lomboy wine, is a Filipino fruit wine made from the fruits of black plum (duhat). It has a bright purple-red color. It is mostly produced in Southern Luzon.
