= Badlapur Jamun =

Jamun variety grown in Maharashtra, India

Badlapur Jamun (बदलापूर जांभूळ)
- Geographical indication
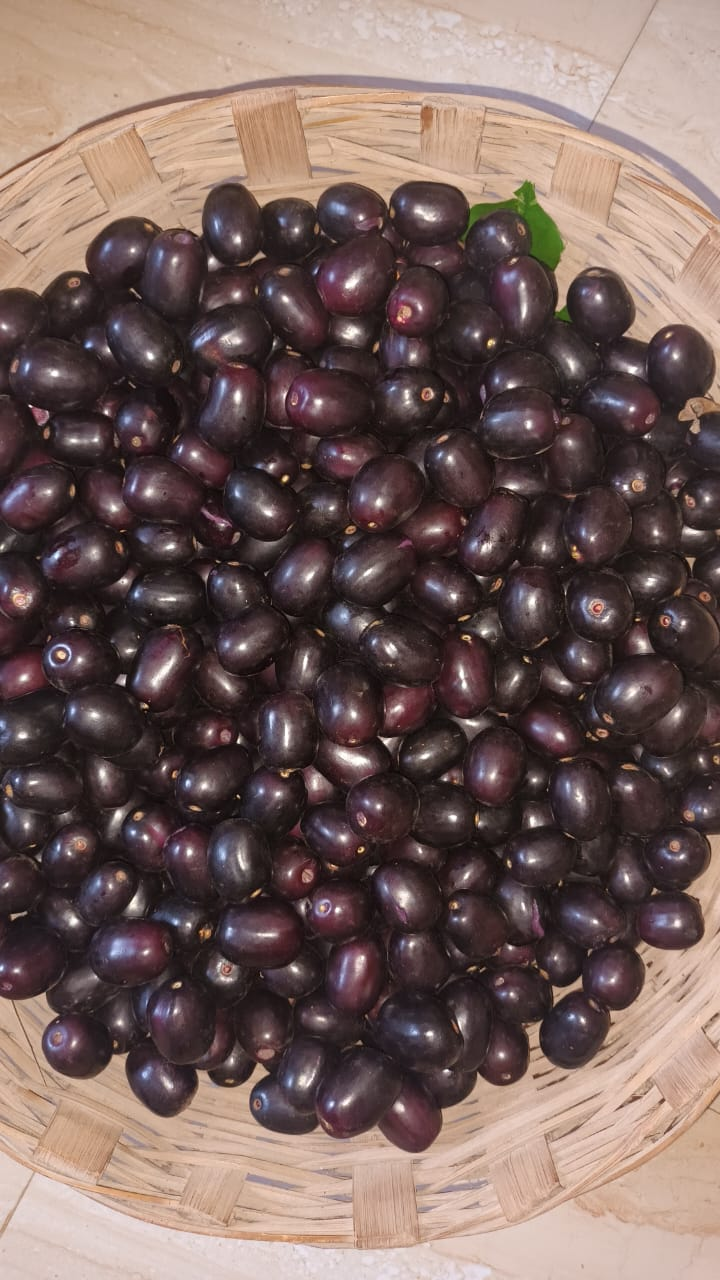
- Alternative names: Badlapur Jambhul
- Description: Jamun variety grown in Maharashtra, India
- Type: Jamun
- Area: Badlapur
- Country: India
- Registered: 31 March 2024
- Official website: ipindia.gov.in

The Badlapur Jamun refers to the traditional variety of the jamun fruit (Syzygium cumini) grown in the Indian state of Maharashtra. Badlapur Jamun is grown in abundance in the Badlapur region of Ambernath taluka located in Thane district.

Under its Geographical Indication tag, it is referred to as "Badlapur Jamun". The fruit is known by other names, including Black plum, Indian blackberry, and Malabar plum.

== Name ==
The name "Badlapur" refers to its main region of cultivation i.e the region of Badlapur which is around 80 km from Mumbai. Locally in the state language of Marathi, it is locally known as Badlapur Jambhul.

== Description ==
It is a vivid purple fruit with a sweet-and-tart taste. The region's laterite soil and climate make the fruit rich in iron and nutrients. The fruit is a source of income for the local tribals from the Katkari and Thakar communities who are primarily involved in plucking and selling the Badlapur jamun fruit. It is eaten for its health benefits, which include anti-diabetes and anti-cancer properties. The seeds are used to make medicine for blood sugar control, and the leaves are used to treat jaundice. The Adivasi community in the Jambhul village of Badlapur used a barter system for years, trading jamuns for food and other essentials. As of 2023, environmentalists have readied 2,000 saplings to supplement the existing 1,250 trees in and around Badlapur.

== Photo Gallery ==
Actual photos from Aditya Gole of Jambhul Parisamvardhan and Samuday Vikas Charitable Trust - the original applicants for the GI Tag registration

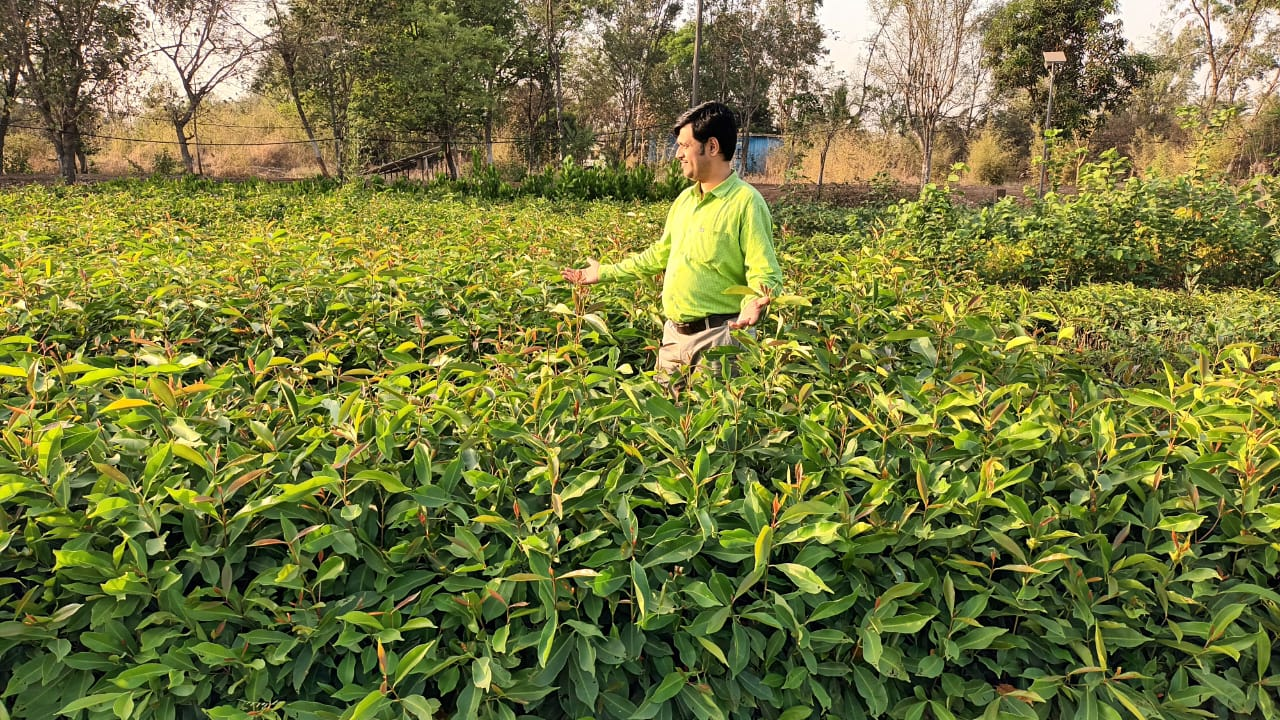
Aditya Gole inspecting Jamun plant nursery at Badlapur

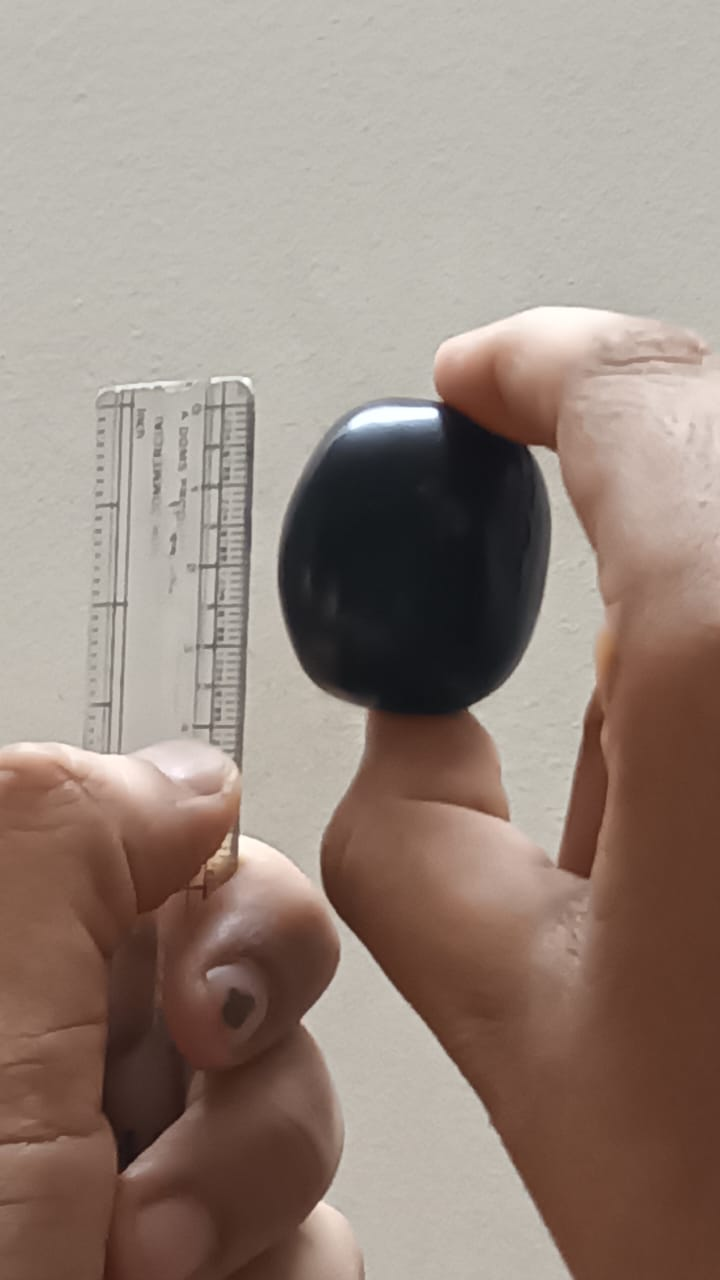
Badlapur Jamun size measurement – Approx. 3.5 cm in length

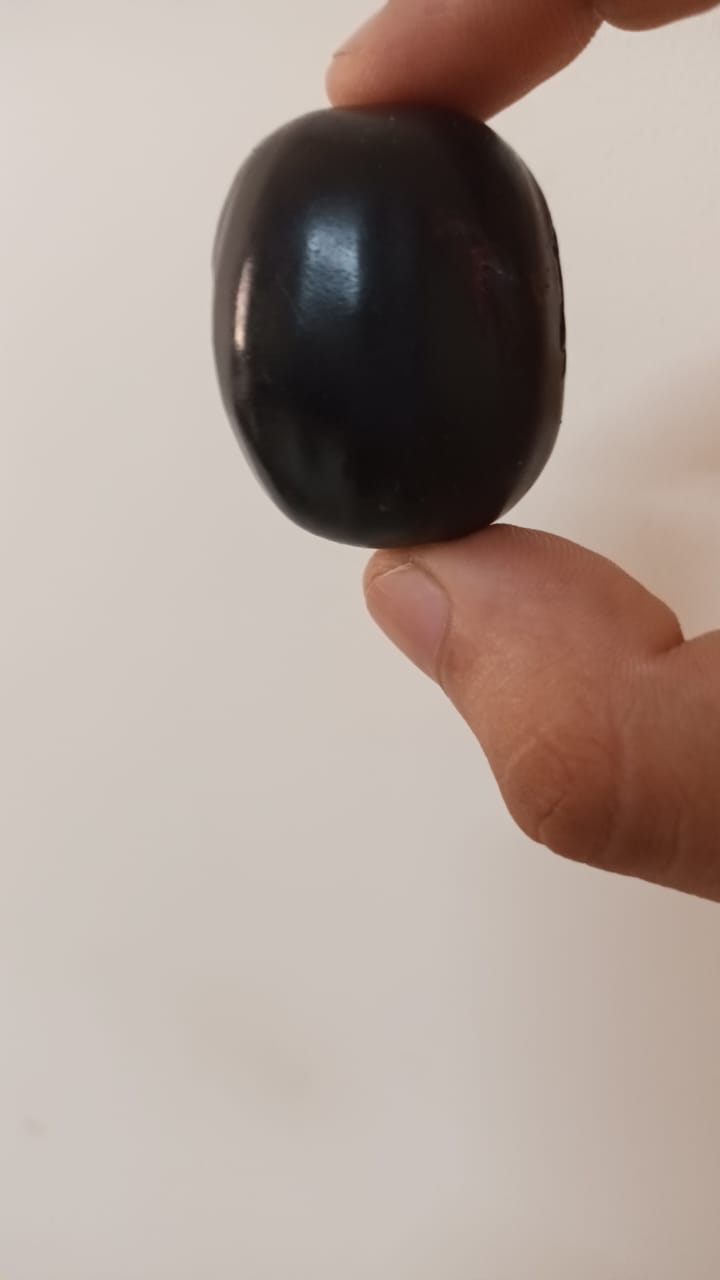
Closeup photo of Badlapur Jamun

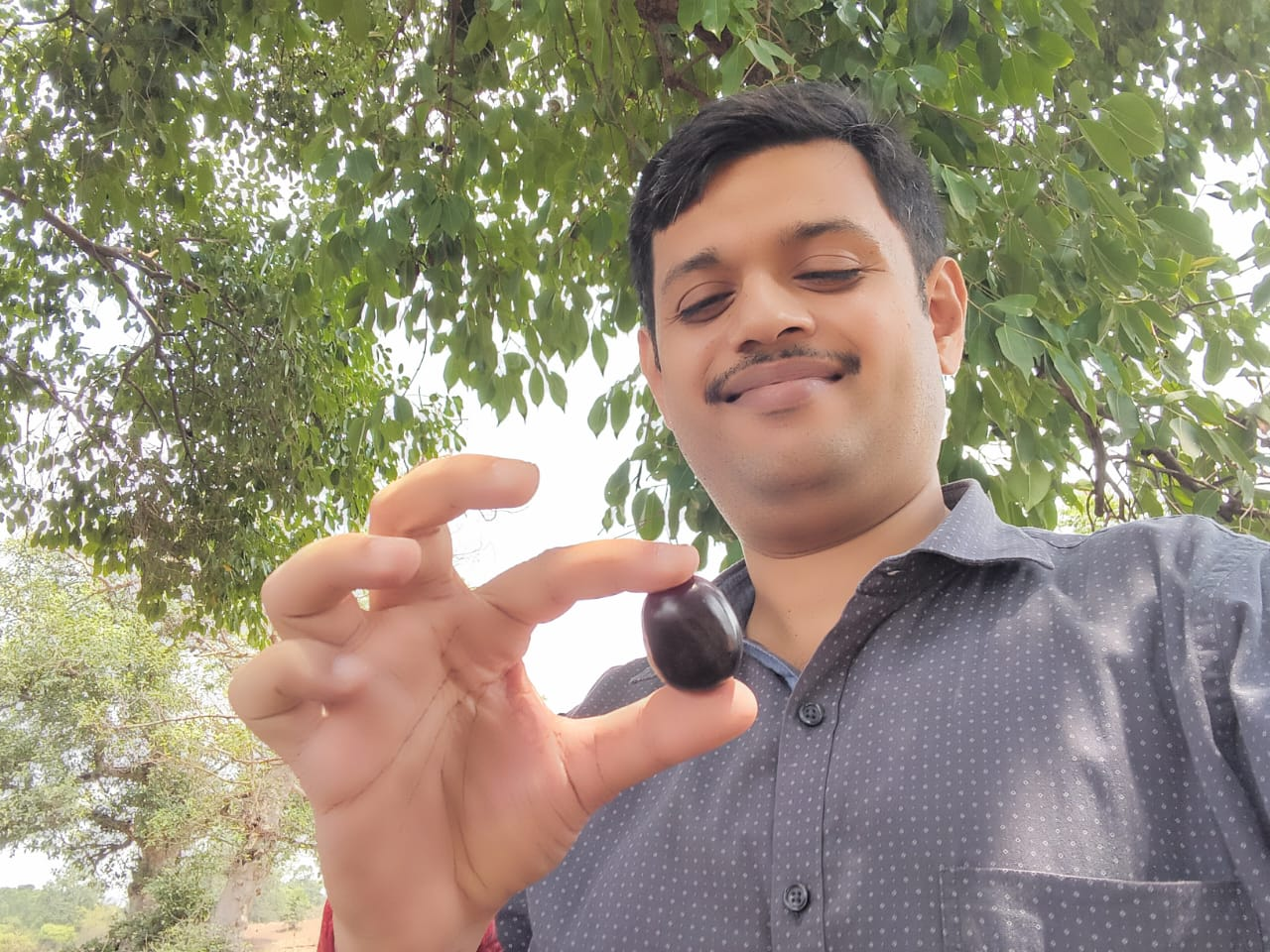
Inspecting Badlapur Jamun in hand

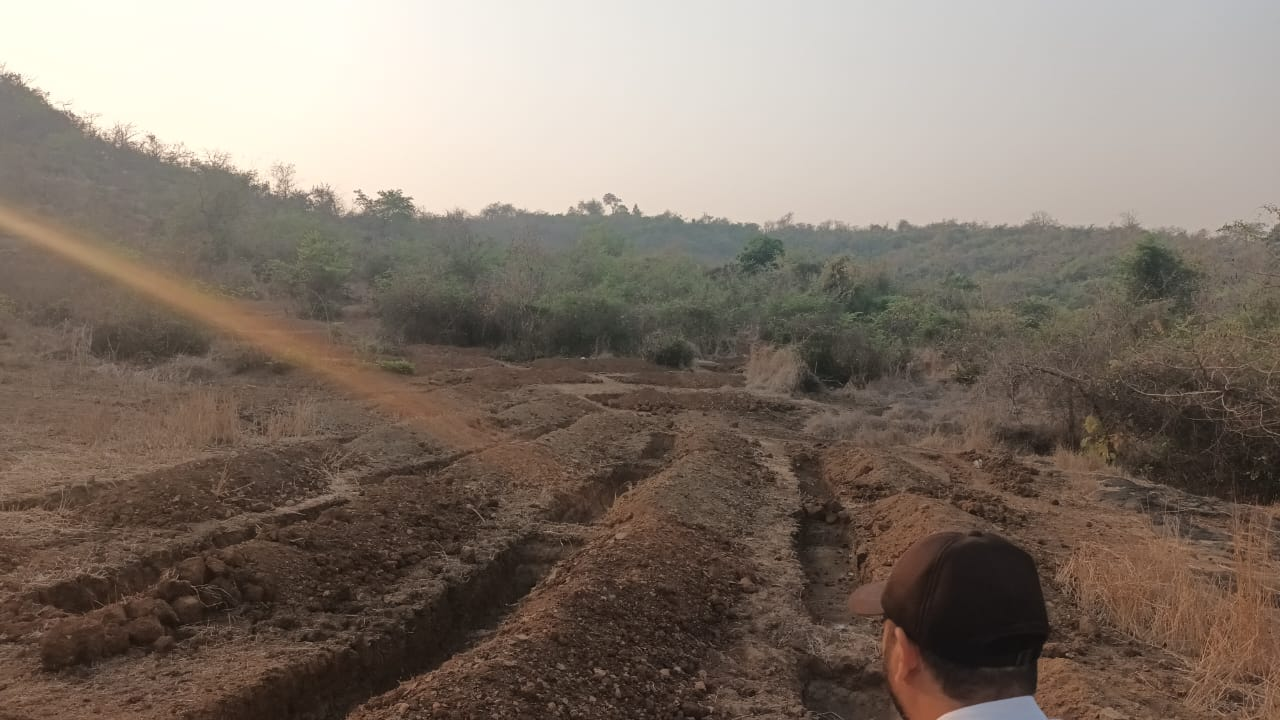
Trenches prepared in Chamtoli village for planting

== Geographical indication ==
It was awarded the Geographical Indication (GI) status tag from the Geographical Indications Registry under the Union Government of India on 31 March 2024 (valid until 23 May 2032).

Jambhul Parisamvardhan and Samuday Vikas Charitable Trust headed by Aditya Gole from Badlapur proposed the GI registration of Badlapur Jamun with five varieties of Jamun from the Badlapur region were sent to the Bhabha Atomic Research Centre for quality testing at its Food Technology Department. After filing the application May 2022, the Jamun was granted the GI tag in 2024 by the Geographical Indication Registry in Chennai, making the name "Badlapur Jamun" exclusive to the Jamuns grown in the region. It thus became the 1st Jamun variety from India before Bahadoli Jamun and the 47th type of goods from Maharashtra to earn the GI tag.

== See also ==
- Bahadoli Jamun
