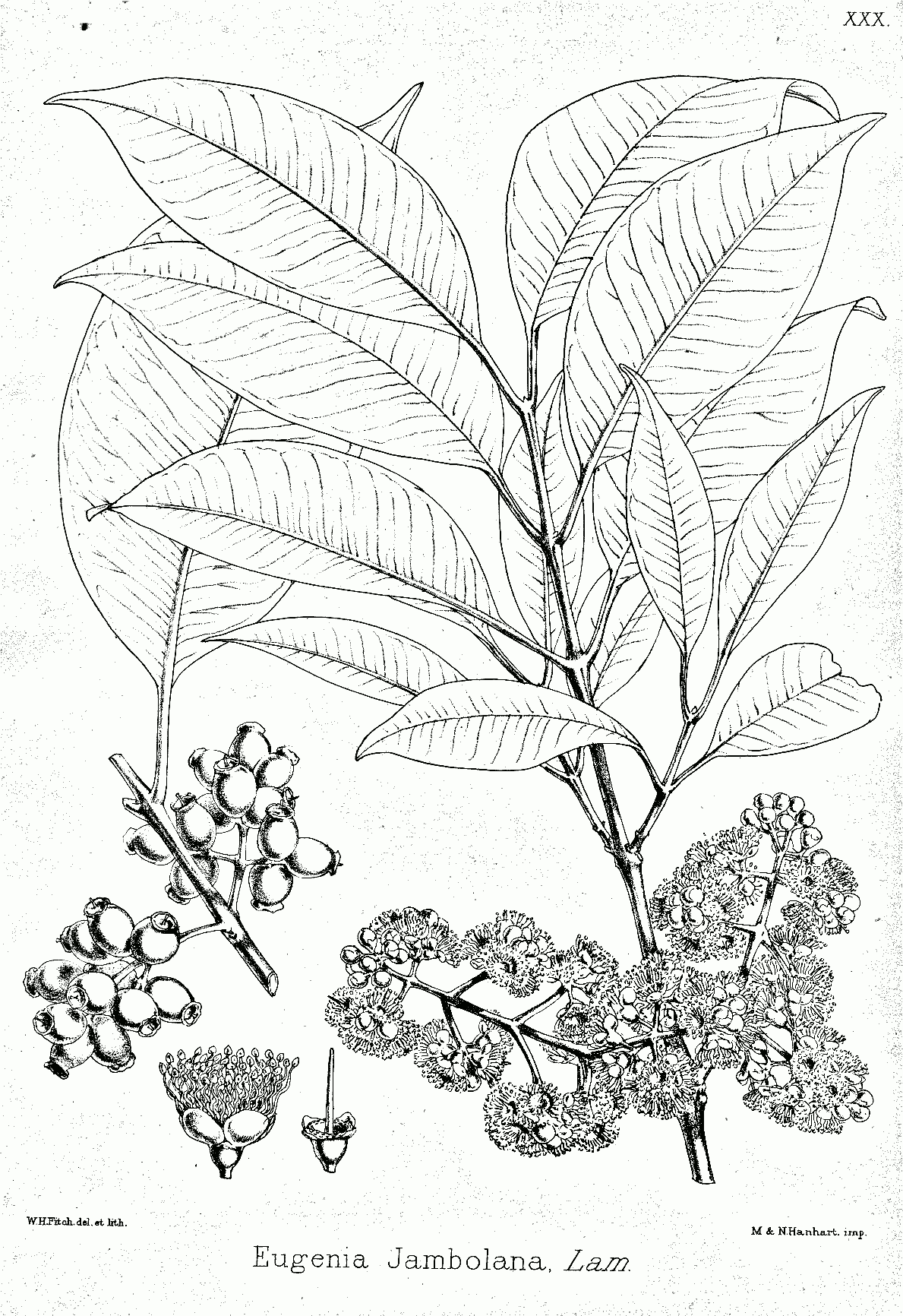

Conservation status
- Least Concern (IUCN 3.1)

Scientific classification
- Kingdom: Plantae
- Clade: Tracheophytes
- Clade: Angiosperms
- Clade: Eudicots
- Clade: Rosids
- Order: Myrtales
- Family: Myrtaceae
- Genus: Syzygium
- Species: S. cumini

Binomial name
- Syzygium cumini (L.) Skeels.

Synonyms
- List: Calyptranthes caryophyllifolia Willd.; Calyptranthes cumini (L.) Pers.; Calyptranthes cuminodora Stokes; Calyptranthes jambolana (Lam.) Willd.; Calyptranthes jambolifera Stokes; Calyptranthes oneillii Lundell; Calyptranthes pedunculata Forsyth f.; Caryophyllus corticosus Stokes; Caryophyllus jambos Stokes; Eugenia brachiata Roxb.; Eugenia calyptrata Roxb. ex Wight & Arn.; Eugenia caryophyllifolia Lam.; Eugenia cumini (L.) Druce; Eugenia djouat Perrier; Eugenia fruticosa (DC.) Roxb.; Eugenia jambolana Lam.; Eugenia jambolifera Roxb. ex Wight & Arn.; Eugenia obovata Poir.; Eugenia obtusifolia Roxb.; Eugenia odorata Wight; Eugenia tenuis Duthie; Eugenia tsoi Merr. & Chun; Jambolifera chinensis Spreng.; Jambolifera coromandelica Houtt.; Myrtus corticosa Spreng.; Myrtus cumini L.; Myrtus obovata (Poir.) Spreng.; Syzygium brachiatum (Roxb.) Miq.; Syzygium caryophyllifolium (Lam.) DC.; Syzygium fruticosum DC.; Syzygium jambolanum (Lam.) DC.; Syzygium obovatum (Poir.) DC.; Syzygium obtusifolium (Roxb.) Kostel.; Syzygium pseudojambolana Miq.; Syzygium tenue (Duthie) N.P.Balakr.

= Syzygium cumini =

Species of tree

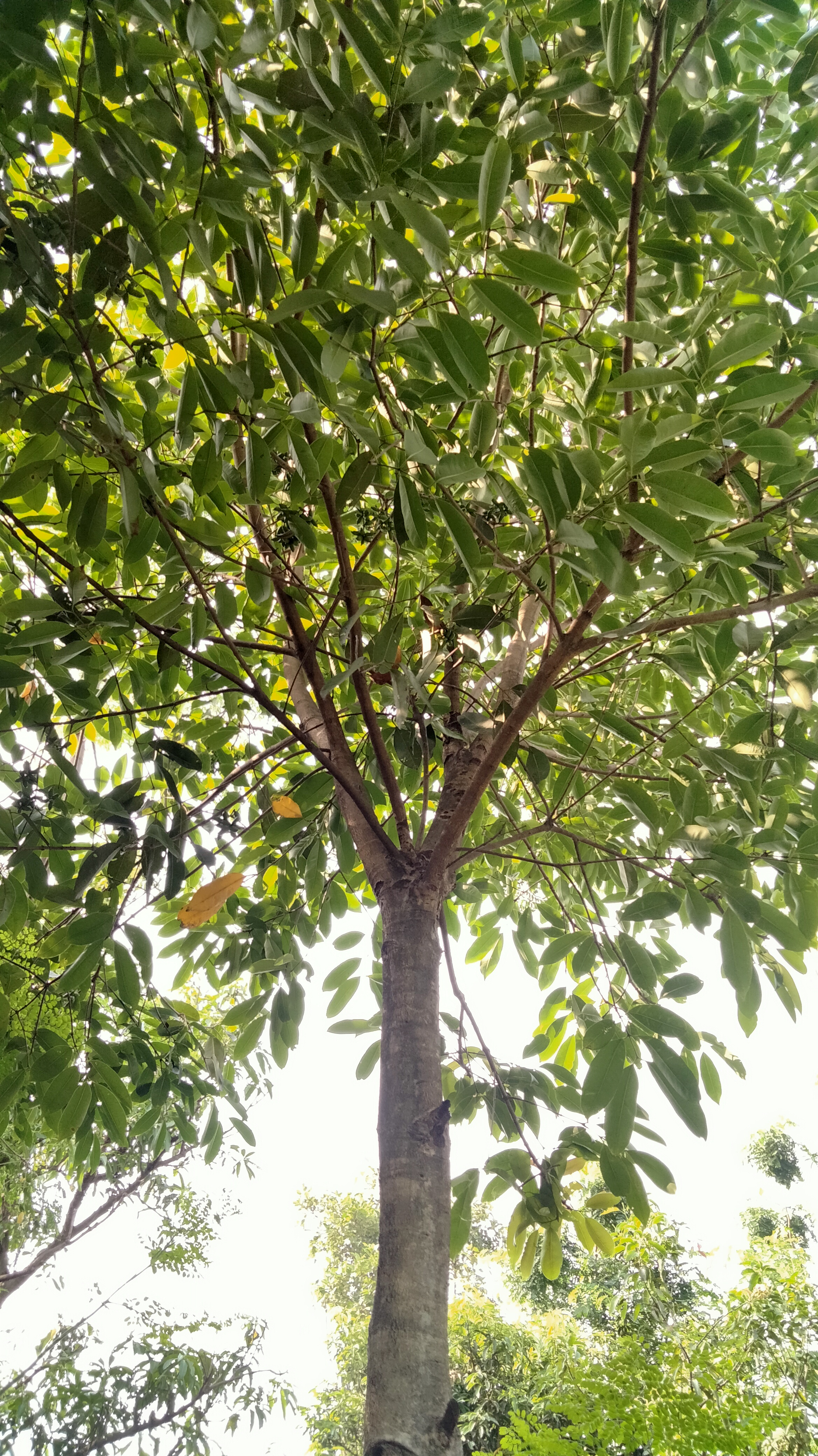
View of Syzygium cumini tree at Laxman Garden in Basuki Bihari. In the Mithila region, it is known as Jamun Gachhi.

Syzygium cumini, also known as Java plum, Malabar plum, jambolan, black plum, jamun, jambul, is an evergreen tropical tree in the flowering plant family Myrtaceae, and favored for its fruit, timber, and ornamental value. It is native to the Indian subcontinent and Southeast Asia. It can reach heights of up to 30 m (100 ft) and can live more than 100 years. A rapidly growing plant, it is considered an invasive species in many world regions.

Syzygium cumini has been introduced to areas including islands of the Pacific and Indian Oceans, Australia, Hong Kong and Singapore.

The tree was introduced to Florida and is grown in tropical and subtropical regions worldwide. Its fruits are eaten by various native birds and small mammals, such as jackals, civets, and fruit bats.

== Description ==
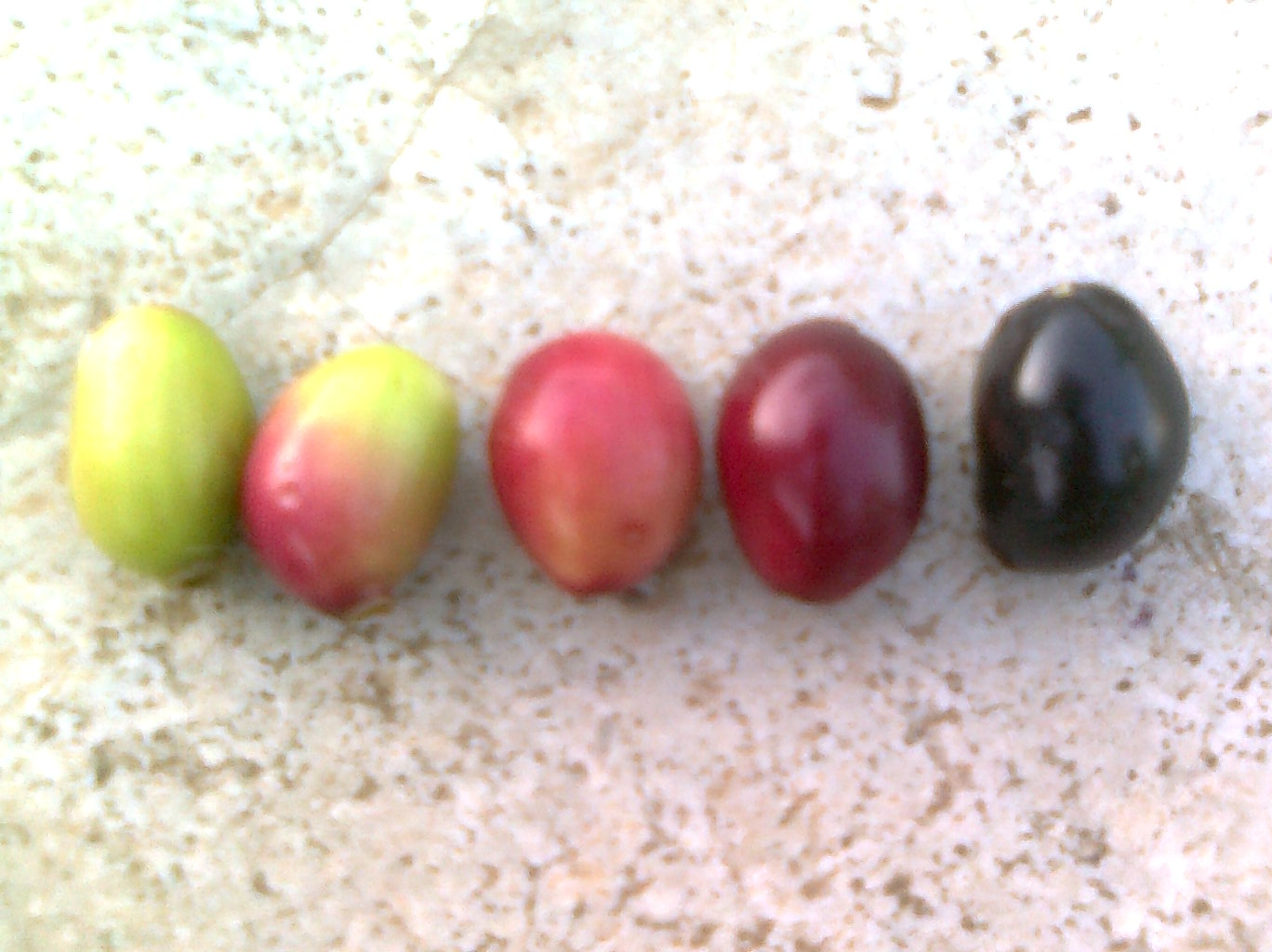
Syzygium cumini fruit color changing from green to pink to blood red to black as it matures

Its dense foliage provides shade and is grown for its ornamental value. At the base of the tree, the bark is rough and dark grey, becoming lighter grey and smoother higher up. The wood is water resistant after being kiln-dried. Because of this, it is used in railway sleepers and to install motors in wells. It is sometimes used to make cheap furniture and village dwellings, though it is relatively hard for carpentry.

The aromatic leaves are pinkish when young, changing to a leathery, glossy dark green with a yellow midrib as they mature. The leaves are used as food for livestock, as they have good nutritional value.

Syzygium cumini trees start flowering from March to April. The flowers are fragrant and small, about 5 mm (0.2 in) in diameter. The fruits develop by May or June and resemble large berries; the fruit of Syzygium species is described as "drupaceous". The fruit is oblong, ovoid. Unripe fruit looks green. As it matures, its color changes to pink, then to shining crimson red and finally to black color. A variant of the tree produces white-coloured fruit. The fruit has a combination of sweet, mildly sour, and astringent flavour and tends to colour the tongue purple.

Java-plum, (jambolan), raw
Nutritional value per 100 g (3.5 oz)
- Energy: 251 kJ (60 kcal)
- Carbohydrates: 16 g
- Fat: 0.23 g
- Protein: 0.7 g
Vitamins and minerals
| Vitamins | Quantity %DV^{†} |
| Thiamine (B1) | 1% 0.006 mg |
| Riboflavin (B2) | 1% 0.012 mg |
| Niacin (B3) | 2% 0.26 mg |
| Vitamin B6 | 2% 0.038 mg |
| Vitamin C | 16% 14 mg |
| Minerals | Quantity %DV^{†} |
| Calcium | 1% 19 mg |
| Iron | 1% 0.2 mg |
| Magnesium | 4% 15 mg |
| Phosphorus | 1% 17 mg |
| Potassium | 3% 79 mg |
| Sodium | 1% 14 mg |
- Other constituents: Quantity
- Water: 83 g
- Link to USDA Database entry
- ^{†}Percentages estimated using US recommendations for adults, except for potassium, which is estimated based on expert recommendation from the National Academies.

== Distribution ==
Syzygium cumini is native to the Indian subcontinent (the Andaman Islands, Bangladesh, Nepal, India, Pakistan, Assam state, the Laccadive Islands and Sri Lanka); China (Hainan province, South-Central and Southeast China); Indonesia (Java, the Maluku Islands, Sulawesi); Southeast Asia (Cambodia, Laos, Malaysia, Thailand, Vietnam and Myanmar); Australia (Queensland).

== Invasive species ==
This species is considered invasive in Florida, South Africa, parts of the Caribbean, several islands of Oceania, and Hawaii.

== Culinary uses ==
Jambolan fruits have a sweet or slightly acidic flavor, are eaten raw, and may be made into sauces or jam. Fruits may be made into juice, jelly, sorbet, syrup (e.g., kala khatta), or fruit salad.

=== Nutrition ===
Raw fruit is 83% water, 16% carbohydrates, 1% protein, and contains negligible fat. In a reference amount of 100 g (3.5 oz), the raw fruit provides 60 calories and a moderate content of vitamin C, with no other micronutrients in appreciable amounts (table).

== Uses ==
The 1889 book The Useful Native Plants of Australia states that this plant (referred to by the synonym Eugenia jambolana) was called durobbi by some Indigenous Australians. Dietrich Brandis also wrote of the plant:

"The fruit is much eaten by the natives of India: in appearance it resembles a damson, has a harsh but sweetish flavour, somewhat astringent and acid. Is much eaten by birds; a favourite food of the large bat (flying fox). A kind of vinegar is prepared from it, which is used in diseases of the spleen."

The fruit has been used in traditional medicine.

== Cultural and religious significance in India ==
In the Majjhima Nikāya, three parallel texts (MN 36, MN 85 and MN 100) claim that the Buddha remembered an experience of sitting in the cool shade of a jambu tree when he was a child. While his father was working, he entered into a meditative state which he later understood to be the first stage of Jhāna meditation. The texts claim that this was a formative experience, which later encouraged him to explore and practise Jhāna meditation, and that this then led to his Awakening. The Pāli word jambu is understood by Pāli dictionaries to refer to the Syzygium cumini which they often translate as the Rose-apple tree.

Krishna was said to have four symbols of the jambu fruit on his right foot as mentioned in the Srimad Bhagavatam commentary (verse 10.30.25), "Sri Rupa Chintamani" and "Ananda Candrika" by Srila Visvanatha Chakravarti Thakura.

In Maharashtra, Syzygium cumini leaves are used in marriage pandal decorations. A song from the 1977 film Jait Re Jait mentions the fruit in the song "Jambhul Piklya Zaadakhali".

Besides the fruits, wood from neredu tree (as it is called in the region's language, Telugu) is used in Andhra Pradesh to make bullock cart wheels and other agricultural equipment. The timber of neredu is used to construct doors and windows.

Legend in Tamil Nadu speaks of Avvaiyar (also Auvaiyar or Auvayar) of the Sangam period and the jamun fruit, called naval pazham in Tamil. Avvaiyar, believing to have achieved everything that is to be achieved, is said to have been pondering over her retirement from Tamil literary work while resting under naval pazham tree. There she was met with and was wittily jousted by a disguised Murugan, regarded as one of the guardian deities of Tamil language, who later revealed himself and made her realize that there is still a lot more to be done and learnt.

== Gallery ==
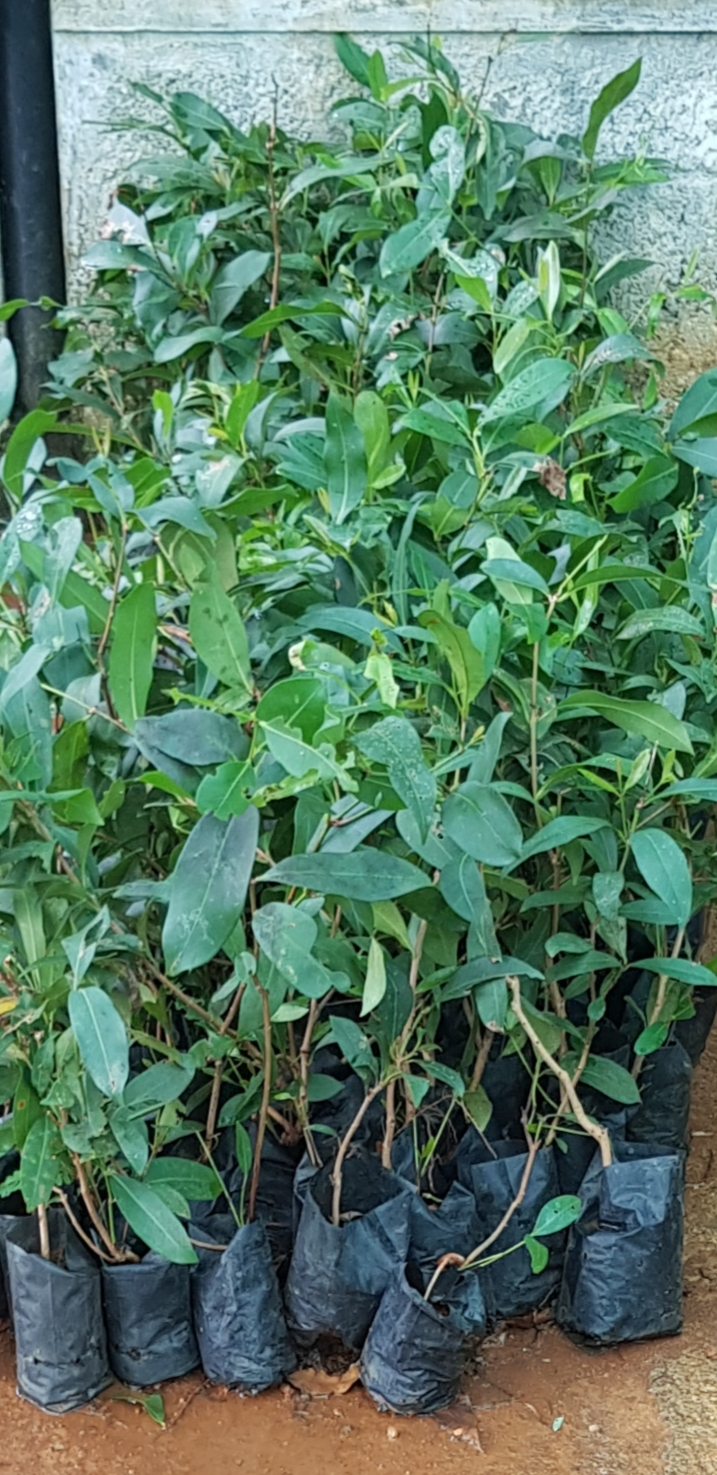
Saplings

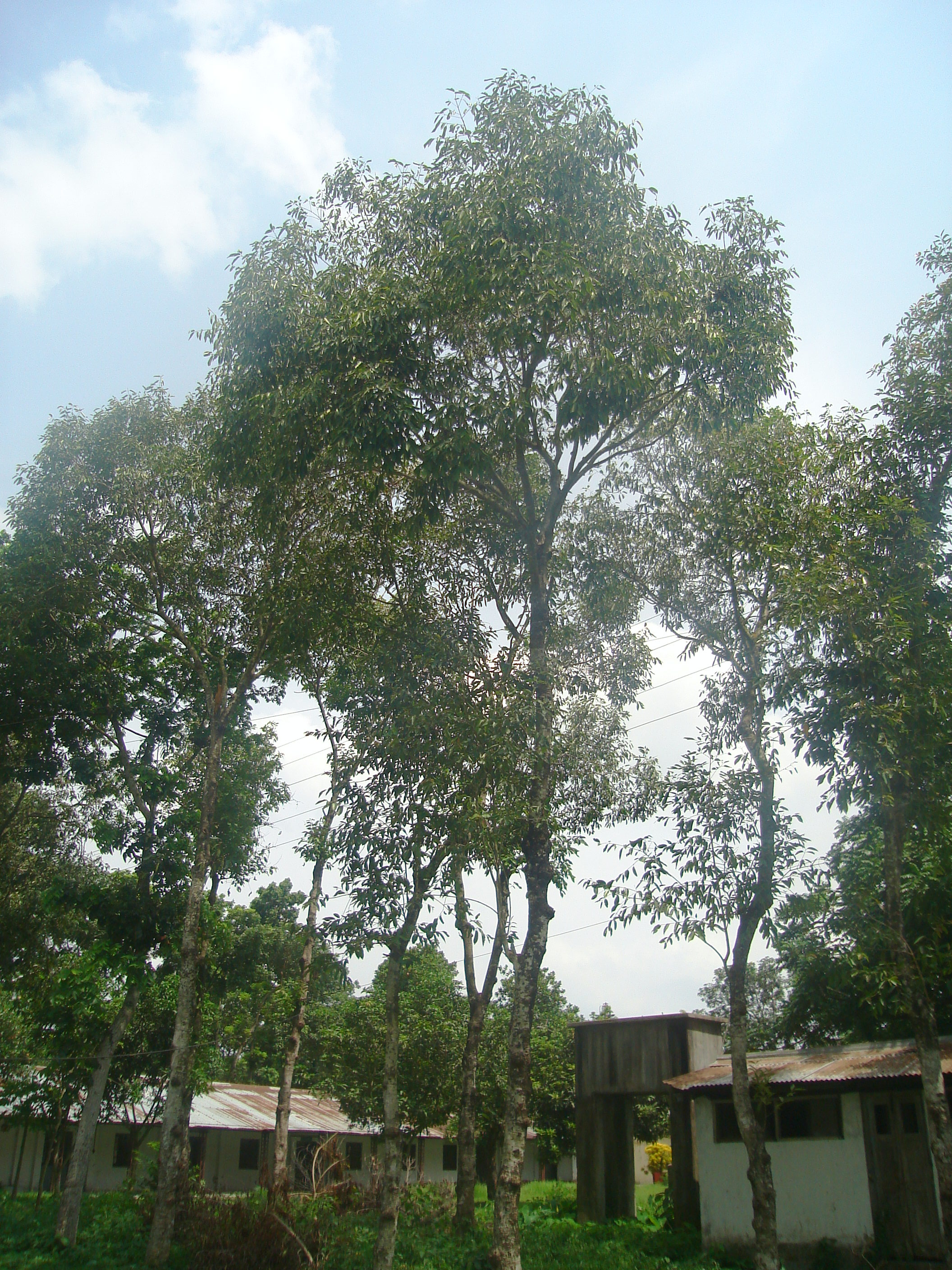
A line of mature trees

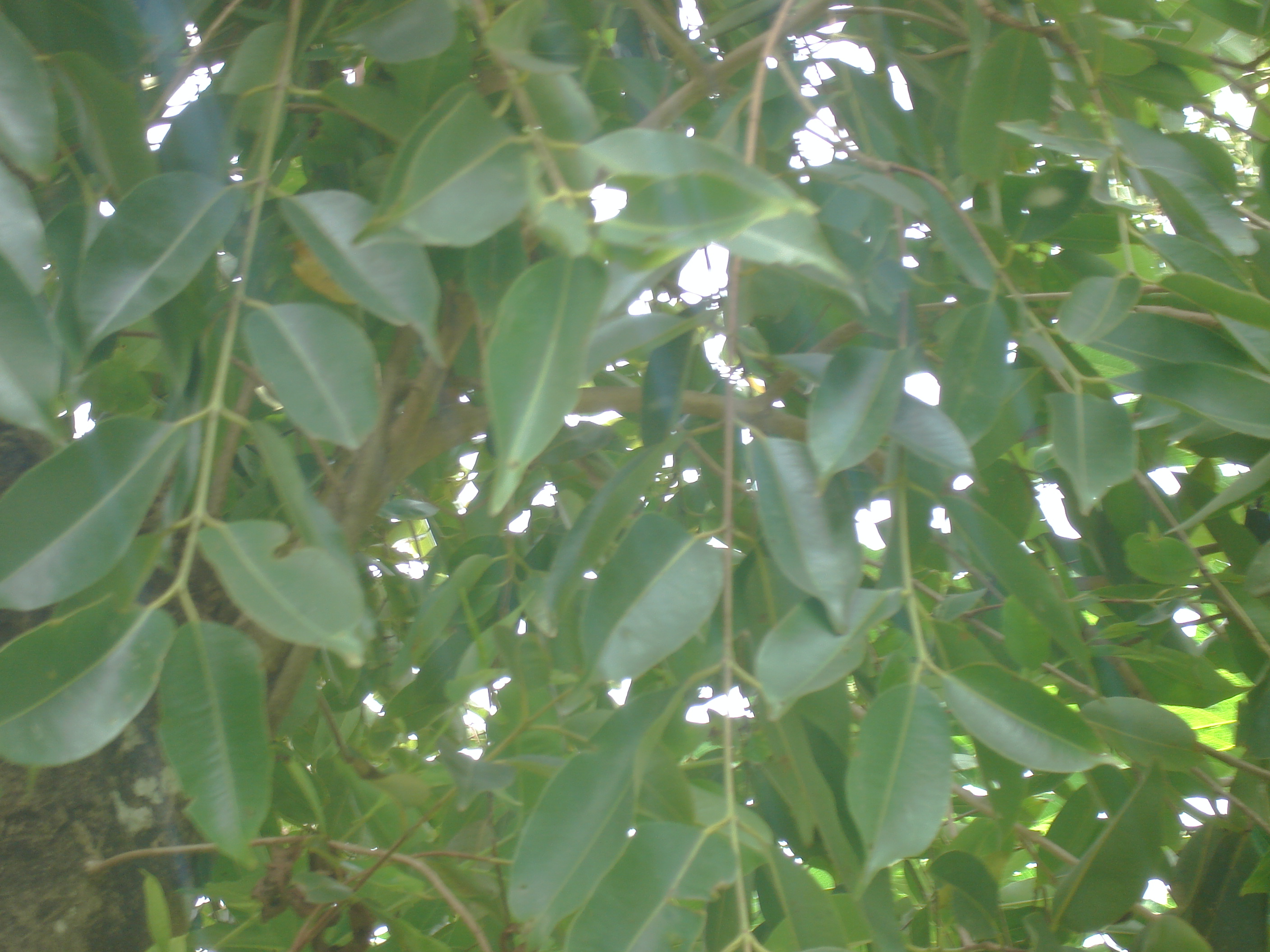
Close view of foliage

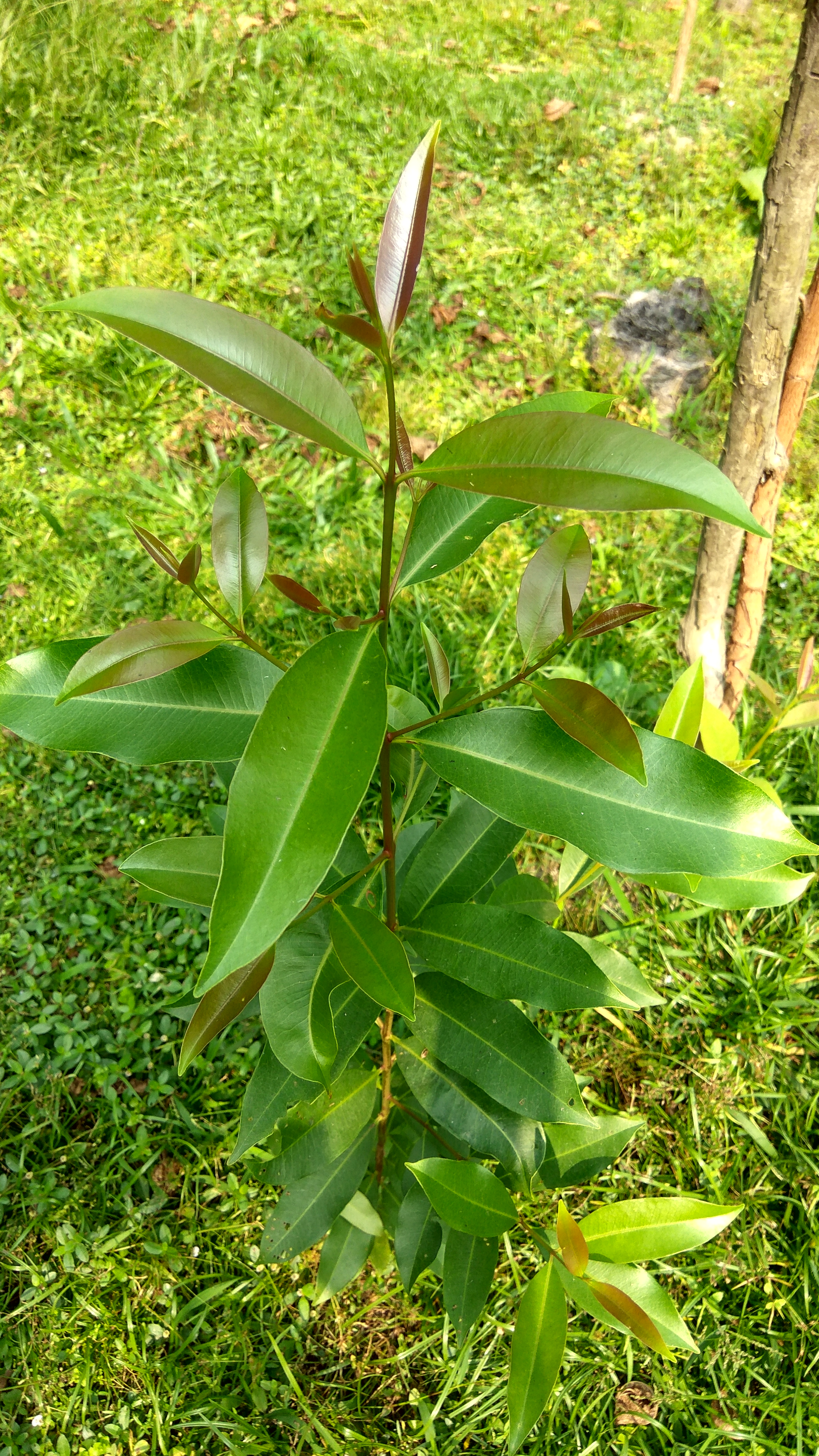
Young plant

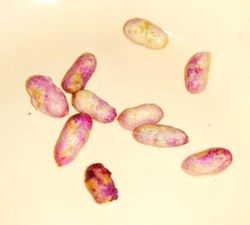
Seeds

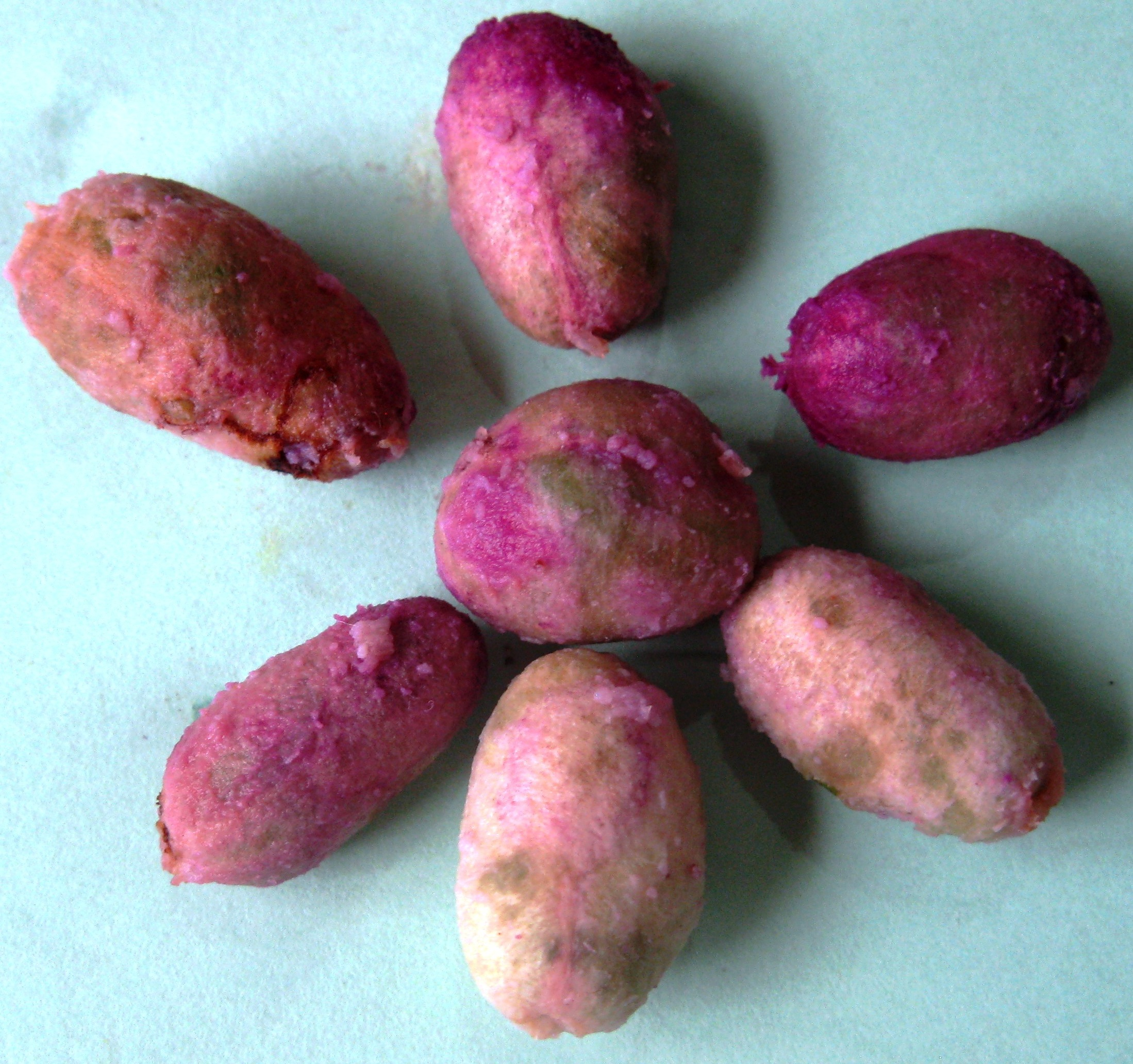
Seeds

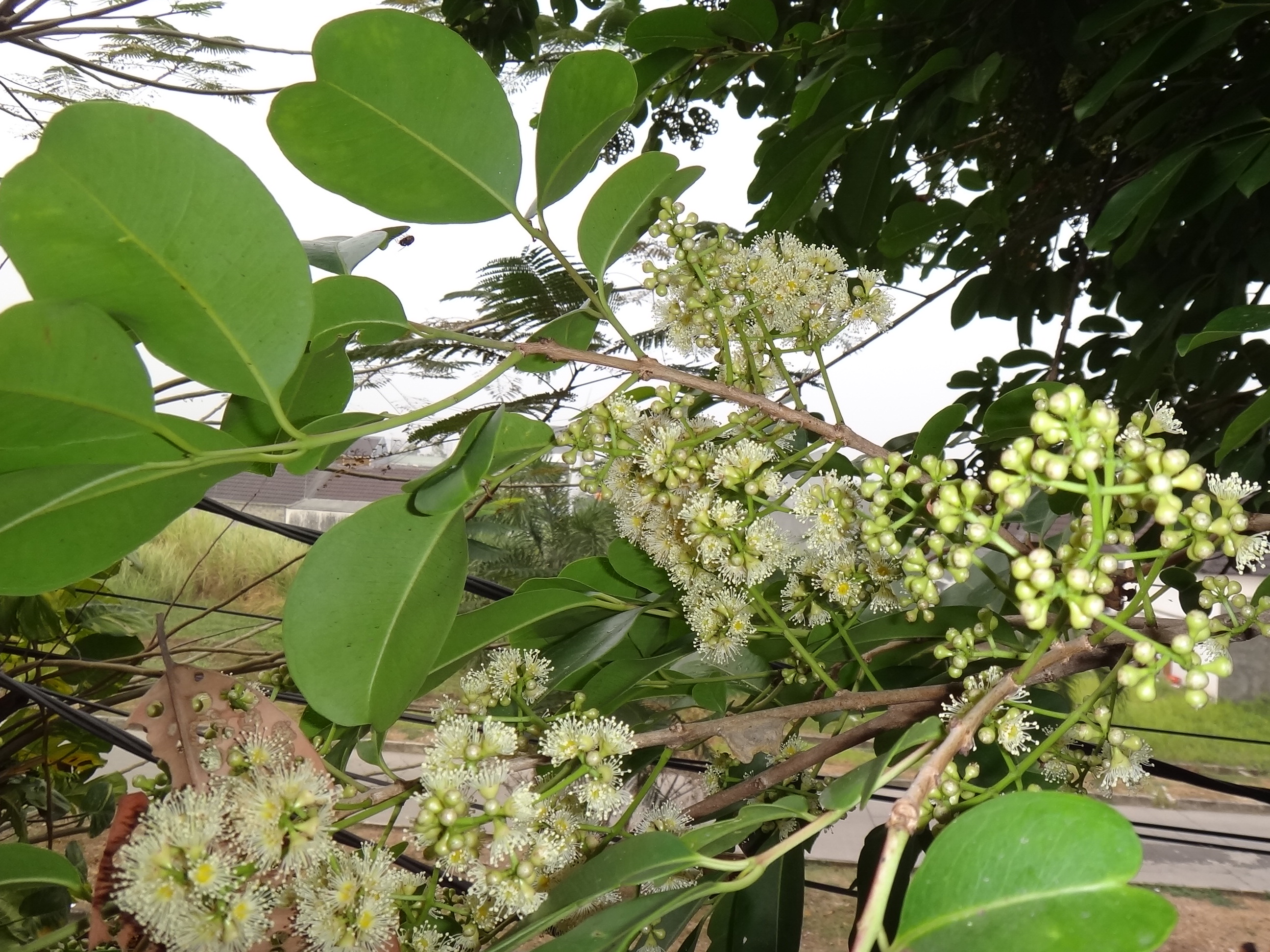
Flower buds and open flowers

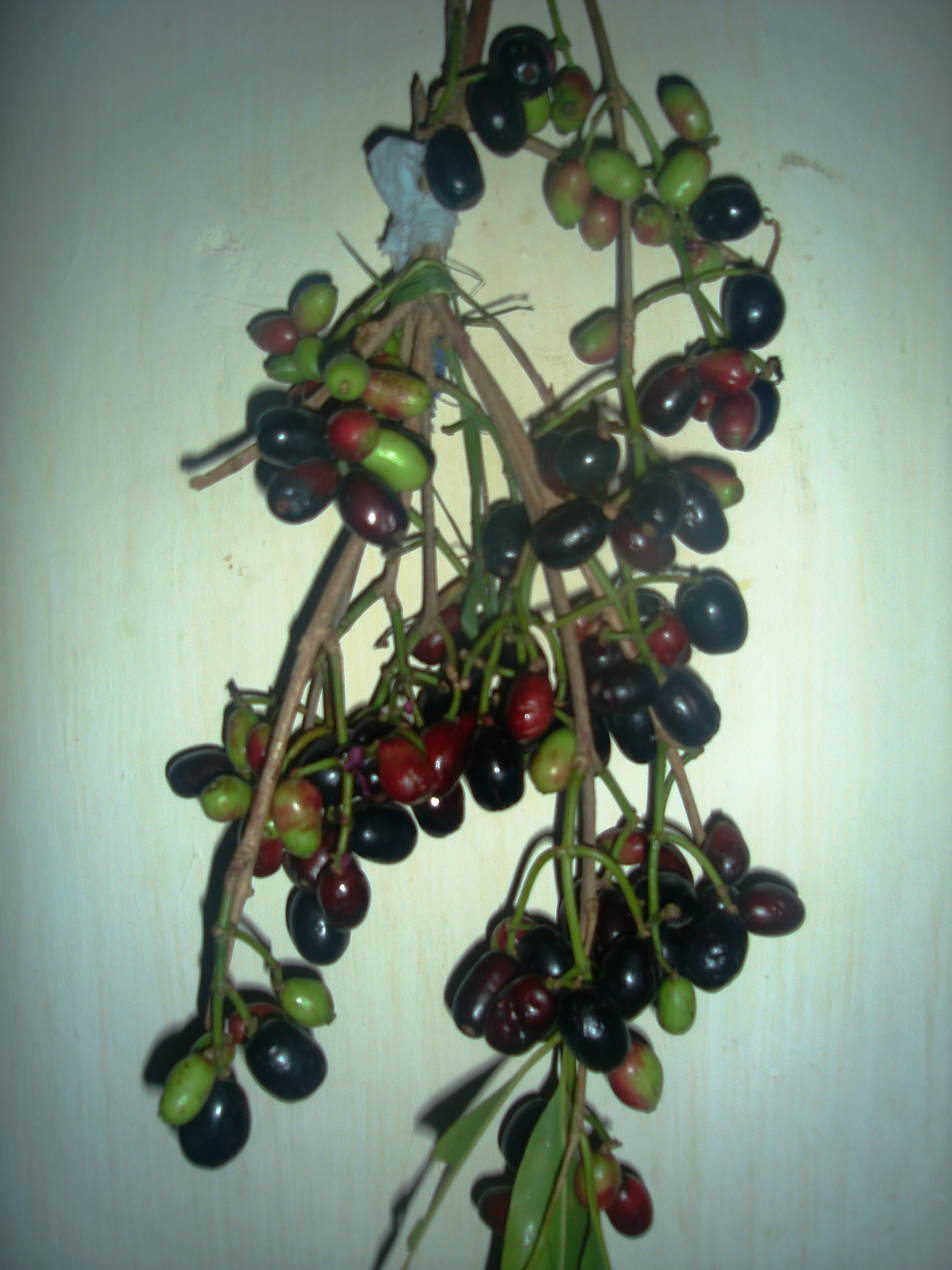
Fruits in various stages of ripeness

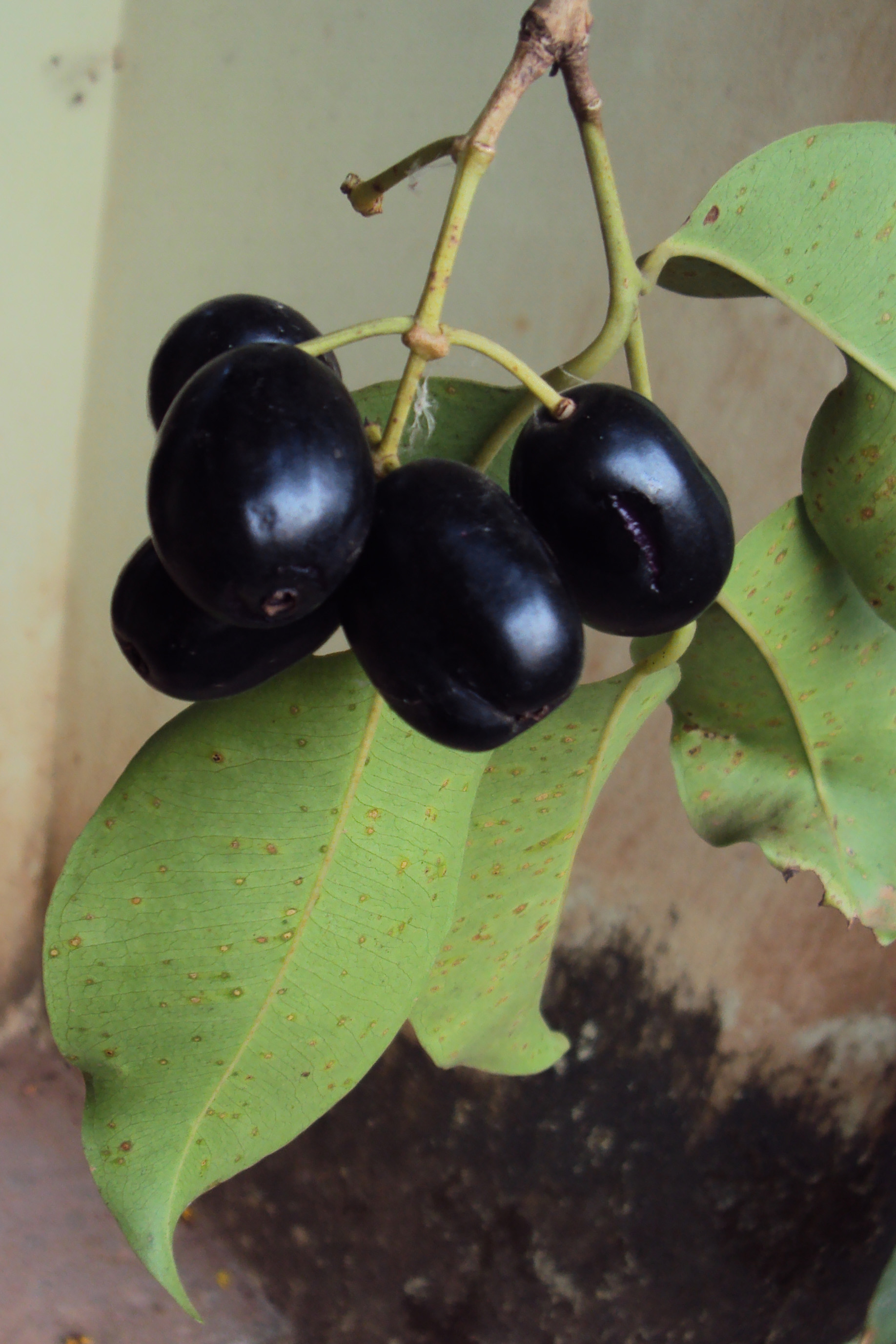
Fruits

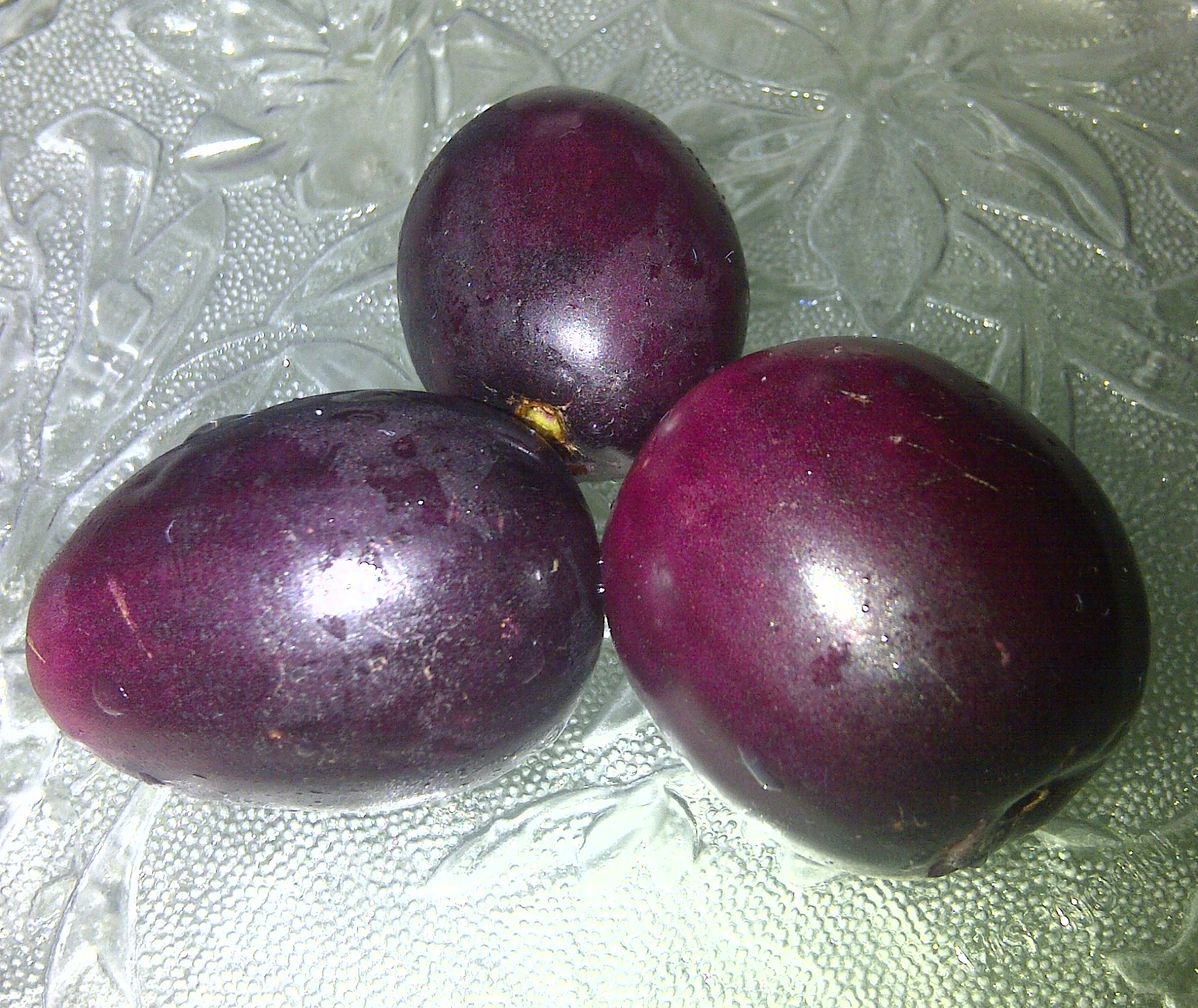
Fruit

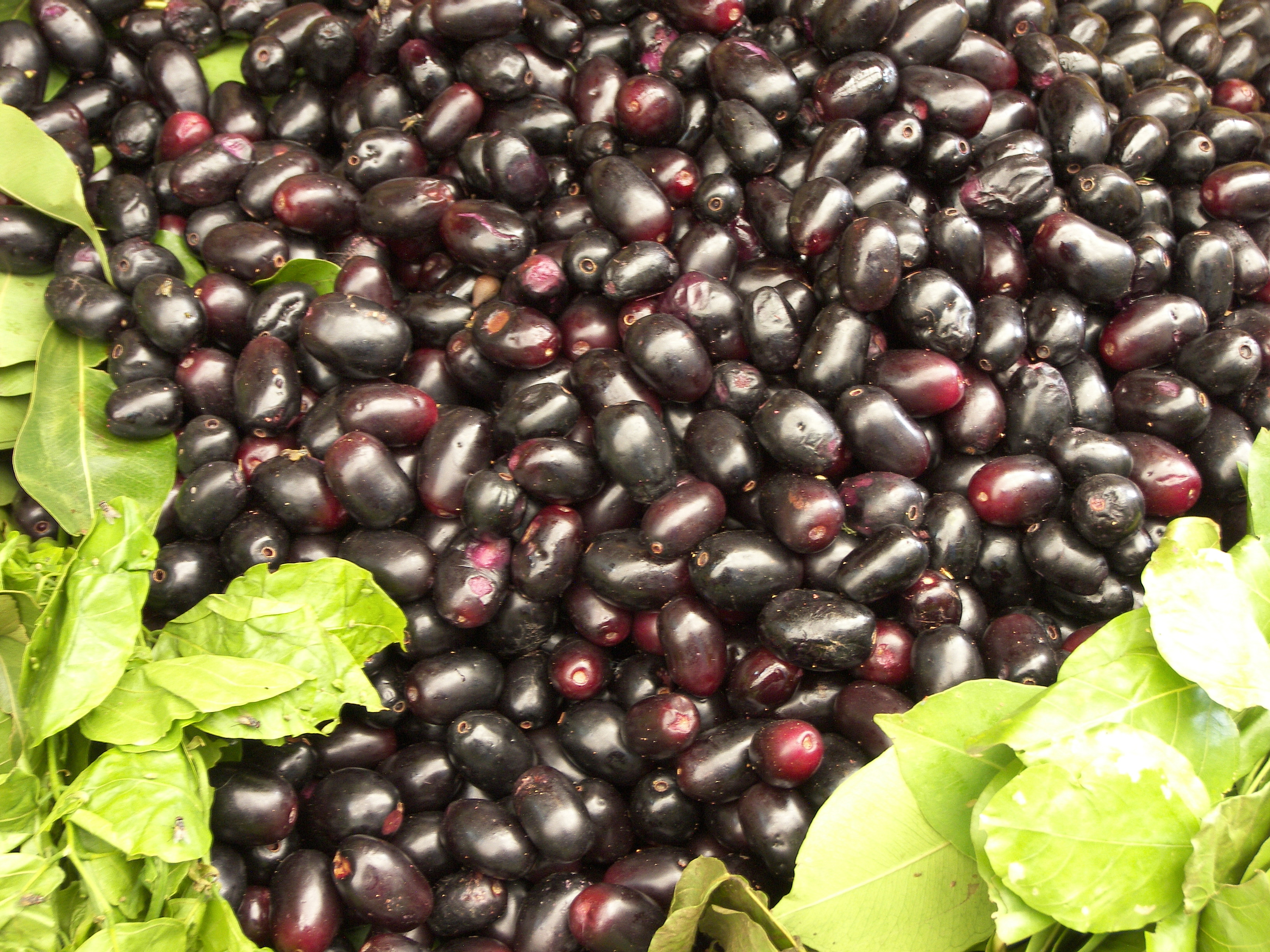
Ripe fruits for sale in a market

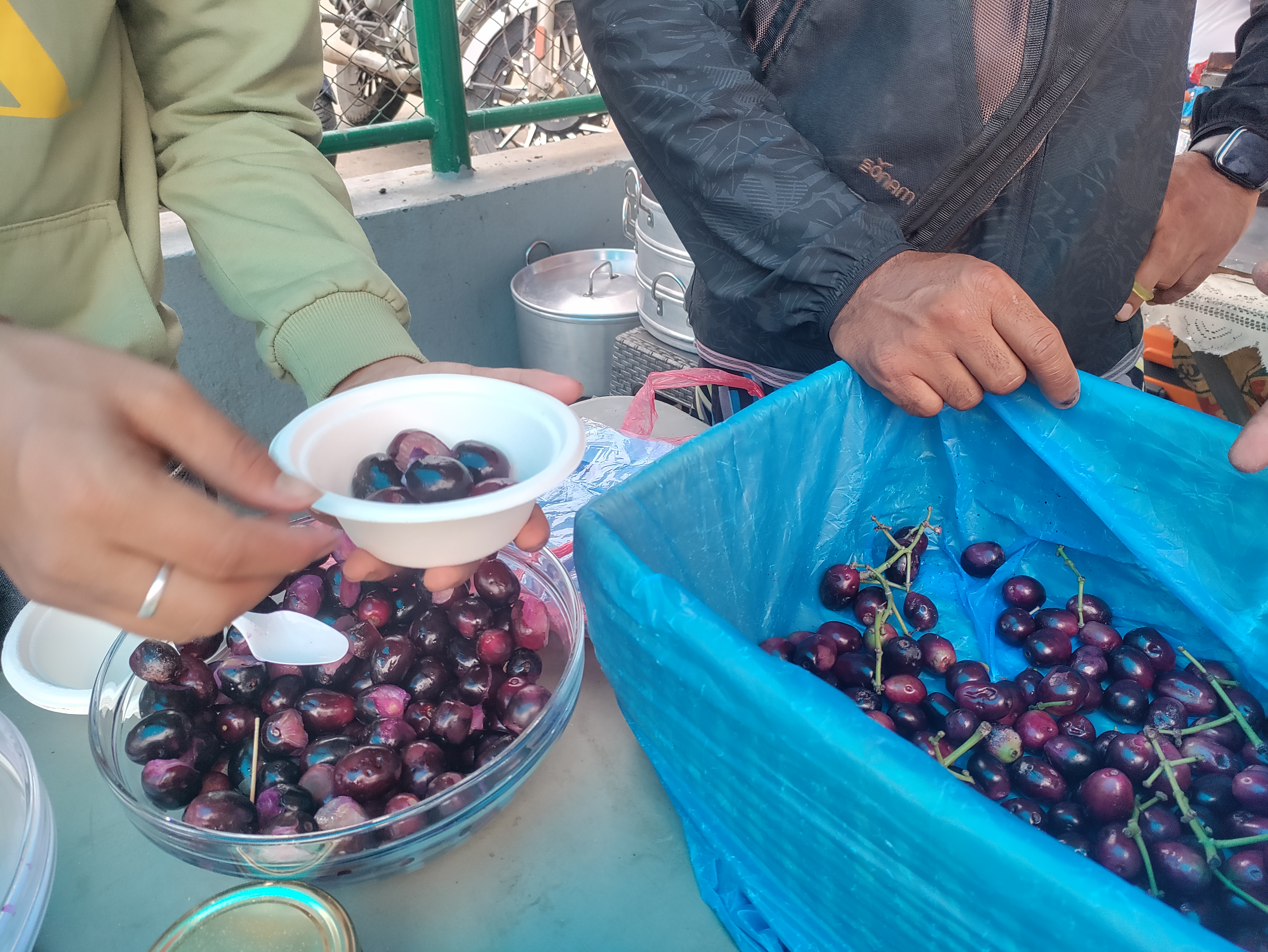
Ripe fruits for sale in a local market of Nepal.

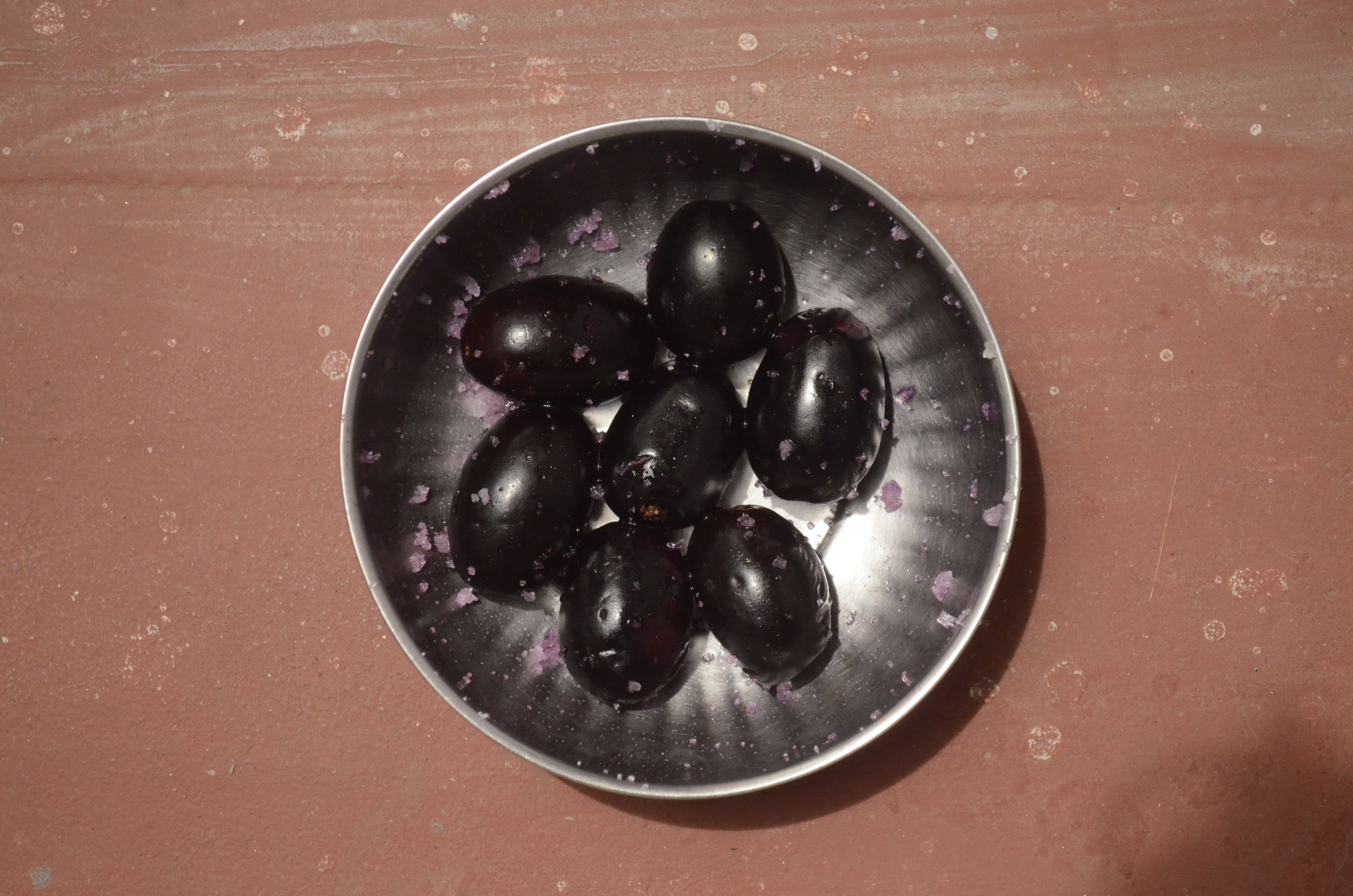
Jamun ripe fruits sprinkled with crystal salt and kept under Sun in India.

== See also ==
- Duhat wine
- Jambudvipa
- Badlapur Jamun
