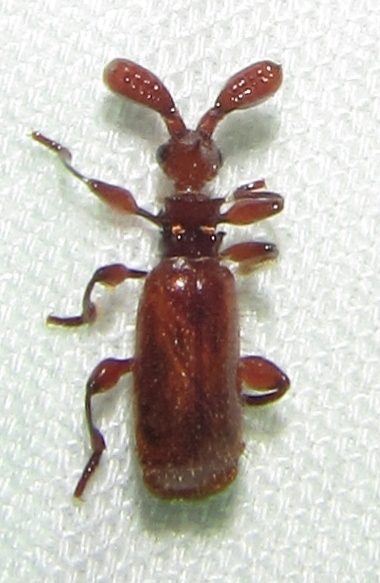
- Paussus bohemani, Botswana

Scientific classification
- Domain: Eukaryota
- Kingdom: Animalia
- Phylum: Arthropoda
- Class: Insecta
- Order: Coleoptera
- Suborder: Adephaga
- Family: Carabidae
- Subfamily: Paussinae
- Tribe: Paussini
- Genus: Paussus; Linnaeus, 1775

Subgenera
- Anapaussus; Bathypaussus; Bohemanipaussus; Edaphopaussus; Hylotorus; Klugipaussus; Lineatopaussus; Paussus; Scaphipaussus; Shuckardipaussus

Diversity
- at least 360 species

Synonyms
- Granulopaussus Luna de Carvalho, 1989; Hylopaussus Luna de Carvalho, 1989; Hylotorus Dalman, 1823

= Paussus =

Genus of beetles

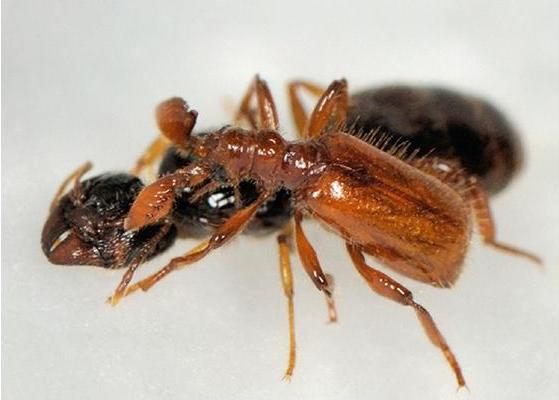
Interactions between Paussus favieri and a queen ant, Pheidole pallidula

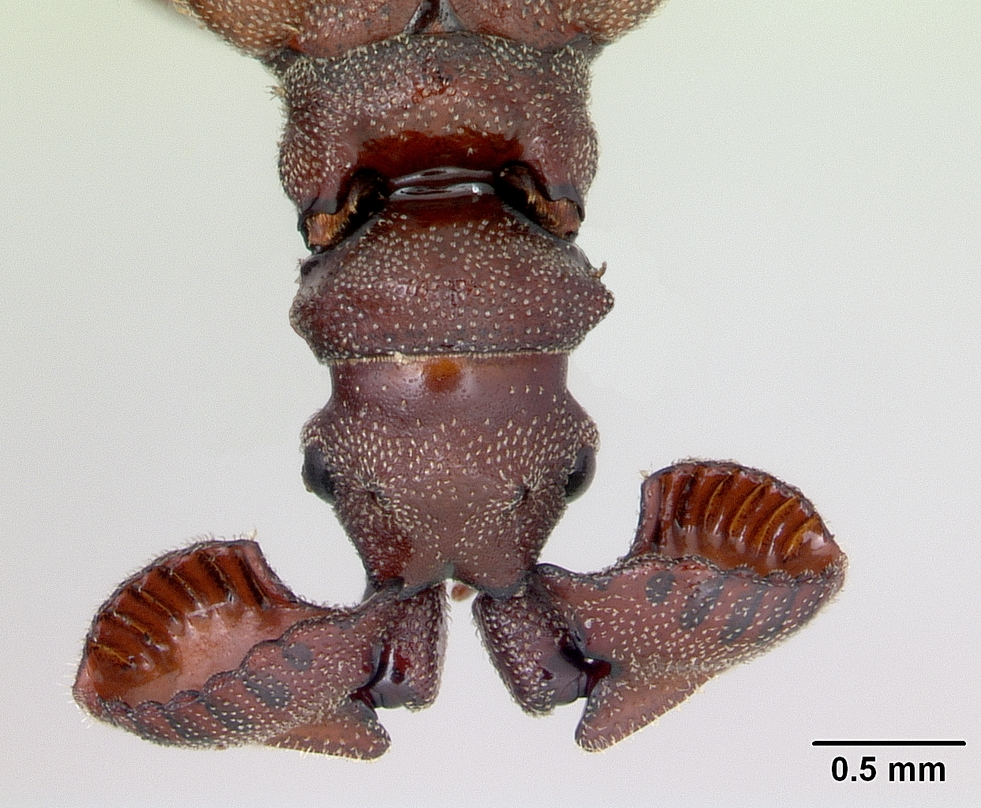
The antennae of Paussus have adapted to produce and release chemicals appeasing to ants. (Paussus scyphus)

Paussus is a genus of ground beetles in the family Carabidae. There are more than 360 described species in Paussus, found in Africa, Europe, and Asia.

These beetles, along with others in the subfamily Paussinae, are known as flanged bombardier beetles due to their ability to explosively discharge benzoquinones, chemical irritants, at temperatures between 55° and 100 °C. A flange on their elytra assists in directing the chemicals toward the front of their bodies.

All species of this genus are obligate myrmecophiles, living symbiotically in ant nests. The beetles release chemicals the ants find rewarding, and in return receive protection for themselves and their larvae. The beetles also gain a source of food in the relationship—the ants.

Female Paussus lay their eggs in ant nests. The larvae develop in the nest and are apparently fed by the ants. Adult Paussus feed at will by piercing and holding an ant with their mandibles and feeding by suction. Ants that were observed being preyed upon did not react aggressively, and remained near the beetle after being released (until dying a short time later).

Some species of Paussus are fully integrated into ant colonies, and are treated as valued guests by the ants. Worker ants groom the beetles and actively lick or palpate exposed regions of the beetle's body, particularly those rich in the chemicals attractive to the ants. Worker ants sometimes grasp adult Paussus by their antennae and legs to transport them to new nests.

Observations of Paussus favieri with its host ants Pheidole pallidula revealed the beetle interacting directly with the queen in her chamber, rubbing against the queen's body, with no aggressive behaviour from the queen or the workers. Both the beetle and the queen ant stridulate back and forth during this interaction. In fact, it appears that acoustic communication and deception play an important role in the integration of these beetles into the ant society.

In research published in 2016, the genera Granulopaussus, Hylopaussus, and Hylotorus were determined to be synonyms of Paussus, and their species were transferred to Paussus.

== See also ==
- List of Paussus species
