= List of Paussus species =

These 368 species belong to Paussus, a genus of ground beetles in the family Carabidae.

== Paussus species ==
- Paussus abditus Nagel, 2018
- Paussus acuminicoxis Kolbe, 1896
- Paussus adamsoni Fowler, 1912
- Paussus adeptus Kolbe, 1929
- Paussus adinventus C.A.Dohrn, 1888
- Paussus adjunctus Reichensperger, 1936
- Paussus aenigma Reichensperger, 1954
- Paussus aethiops Blanchard, 1845
- Paussus affinis Westwood, 1833
- Paussus affulgens Reichensperger, 1954
- Paussus afraequatorialis Luna de Carvalho, 1963
- Paussus africanus Luna de Carvalho, 1958
- Paussus afzelii Westwood, 1855
- Paussus aldrovandii Gestro, 1901
- Paussus alienus Reichensperger, 1950
- Paussus alluaudi Reichensperger, 1936
- Paussus ambiguus Reichensperger, 1938
- Paussus americanus Kolbe, 1920
- Paussus andreae Ritsema, 1879
- Paussus angustulus Wasmann, 1922
- Paussus antinorii Gestro, 1881
- Paussus anxius Reichensperger, 1913
- Paussus arabicus Raffray, 1885
- Paussus araneans Luna de Carvalho, 1968
- Paussus arduus Péringuey, 1896
- Paussus aristoteli J.Thomson, 1858
- Paussus armatus Westwood, 1833
- Paussus armicollis Fairmaire, 1899
- Paussus asperulus Fairmaire, 1898
- Paussus assmuthi Wasmann, 1904
- Paussus atheruri Luna de Carvalho, 1960
- Paussus audouinii Westwood, 1852
- Paussus aureofimbriatus Wasmann, 1904
- Paussus aureovellus Reichensperger, 1922
- Paussus avunculus Reichensperger, 1925
- Paussus barkeri Péringuey, 1896
- Paussus basilewskyi Reichensperger, 1952
- Paussus bastinae Luna de Carvalho, 1963
- Paussus batillarius Reichensperger, 1933
- Paussus bayonii Gestro, 1910
- Paussus bekilyanus Jeannel, 1946
- Paussus benoiti Janssens, 1956
- Paussus bicolor Raffray, 1886
- Paussus bicoloricornis Luna de Carvalho, 1963
- Paussus bicornis Wasmann, 1904
- Paussus biflagellatus Luna de Carvalho, 1973
- Paussus bituberculatus Kolbe, 1896
- Paussus blanchardi (Raffray, 1882)
- Paussus bohemani Westwood, 1855
- Paussus borneensis Gestro, 1919
- Paussus bowringii Westwood, 1850
- Paussus boysii Westwood, 1845
- Paussus brancuccii Nagel, 2016
- Paussus braunsi Péringuey, 1897
- Paussus brevicornutus Luna de Carvalho, 1968
- Paussus brincki Reichensperger, 1958
- Paussus brittoni Reichensperger, 1957
- Paussus bucephalus Gyllenhal, 1817
- Paussus buettikeri Nagel, 2006
- Paussus burchelianus Westwood, 1869
- Paussus burgeoni Reichensperger, 1925
- Paussus burmeisteri Westwood, 1838
- Paussus camaxilensis Luna de Carvalho, 1963
- Paussus canaliculatus Wasmann, 1919
- Paussus canteloubei Luna de Carvalho, 1962
- Paussus capillaceus Reichensperger, 1937
- Paussus capreolus Reichensperger, 1913
- Paussus cardoni Wasmann, 1904
- Paussus caroli (Reichensperger, 1913)
- Paussus catalai Jeannel, 1946
- Paussus catoxanthus Gestro, 1923
- Paussus celisi Janssens, 1956
- Paussus centurio C.A.Dohrn, 1881
- Paussus cephalotes Raffray, 1885
- Paussus cerambyx Wasmann, 1904
- Paussus ceratoderinus Luna de Carvalho, 1963
- Paussus cervinus Kraatz, 1892
- Paussus chappuisi Reichensperger, 1938
- Paussus cilipes Westwood, 1845
- Paussus cirenaicus A.Fiori, 1914
- Paussus citernii Gestro, 1912
- Paussus clarkei Luna de Carvalho, 1974
- Paussus cochlearius Westwood, 1838
- Paussus cognatus Westwood, 1842
- Paussus colasi (Antoine, 1952)
- Paussus collarti Reichensperger, 1932
- Paussus comptus Péringuey, 1898
- Paussus concinnus Péringuey, 1896
- Paussus conradti Kolbe, 1896
- Paussus cornutus Chevrolat, 1833
- Paussus coronatus Reichensperger, 1935
- Paussus corporaali Reichensperger, 1927
- Paussus crenaticornis Raffray, 1885
- Paussus crepidulae Luna de Carvalho, 1967
- Paussus cridae Gestro, 1917
- Paussus cucullatus Westwood, 1850
- Paussus cultratus Westwood, 1850
- Paussus curtisii Westwood, 1864
- Paussus cuypersi Luna de Carvalho, 1976
- Paussus cyathiger Raffray, 1885
- Paussus cylindricollis Wasmann, 1922
- Paussus cylindricornis Péringuey, 1885
- Paussus dama H.Dohrn, 1890
- Paussus damarinus Westwood, 1874
- Paussus darlingtoni Reichensperger, 1951
- Paussus decellei Luna de Carvalho, 1980
- Paussus decipiens Reichensperger, 1951
- Paussus dedyckeri Luna de Carvalho, 1976
- Paussus degeeri Westwood, 1855
- Paussus denticulatus Westwood, 1845
- Paussus desneuxi Fowler, 1912
- Paussus dichrous Janssens, 1950
- Paussus dissidens Péringuey, 1898
- Paussus dissimulator Reichensperger, 1928
- Paussus distinguendus Reichensperger, 1925
- Paussus dohrnii Westwood, 1852
- Paussus dollmani Wasmann, 1922
- Paussus donisthorpei Wasmann, 1922
- Paussus drescheri Reichensperger, 1935
- Paussus drumonti Maruyama, 2014
- Paussus eisentrauti Nagel, 1982
- Paussus elaphus H.Dohrn, 1890
- Paussus elizabethae Péringuey, 1897
- Paussus elongatus Kano, 1930
- Paussus escherichi Wasmann, 1911
- Paussus excavatus Westwood, 1833
- Paussus exiguus Reichensperger, 1929
- Paussus fairmairei Raffray, 1886
- Paussus fallax Péringuey, 1892
- Paussus favieri Fairmaire, 1851
- Paussus fichtelii Donovan, 1804
- Paussus fissifrons Fairmaire, 1902
- Paussus fletcheri Fowler, 1912
- Paussus formosus Wasmann, 1912
- Paussus foveifrons Reichensperger, 1926
- Paussus fulvus Westwood, 1842
- Paussus gazella Reichensperger, 1925
- Paussus germari Westwood, 1852
- Paussus ghanensis Luna de Carvalho, 1973
- Paussus glabripennis (Jeannel, 1946)
- Paussus globiceps Reichensperger, 1913
- Paussus goetzei Kolbe, 1926
- Paussus gracilis (Reichensperger, 1930)
- Paussus granulatus Westwood, 1850
- Paussus hardwickii Hope, 1831
- Paussus hasinae Maruyama, 2016
- Paussus hearseyanus Westwood, 1842
- Paussus heinrichi Luna de Carvalho, 1959
- Paussus henningsi Reichensperger, 1929
- Paussus hirsutus Raffray, 1886
- Paussus hisamatsui Maruyama & Ito, 2016
- Paussus horikawae Kano, 1930
- Paussus horni Wasmann, 1902
- Paussus hottentotta (Westwood, 1874)
- Paussus howa C.A.Dohrn, 1881
- Paussus huamboensis Schüle & Bednarik, 2015
- Paussus hughscotti Reichensperger, 1938
- Paussus humbloti Raffray, 1886
- Paussus humboldtii Westwood, 1852
- Paussus hystrix Westwood, 1850
- Paussus incultus Reichensperger, 1926
- Paussus inermis Gerstaecker, 1855
- Paussus inexspectatus Fairmaire, 1899
- Paussus intermedius Reichensperger, 1957
- Paussus intuitivus Kolbe, 1935
- Paussus jacobsoni Wasmann, 1928
- Paussus janssensi Luna de Carvalho, 1956
- Paussus javanus Wasmann, 1899
- Paussus jeanneli Reichensperger, 1936
- Paussus jeannelianus Basilewsky, 1957
- Paussus jengi Maruyama, 2016
- Paussus jerdani Westwood, 1847
- Paussus jousselinii Guérin-Méneville, 1836
- Paussus kanaoi Maruyama, 2016
- Paussus kannegieteri Wasmann, 1896
- Paussus kecil Maruyama, 2016
- Paussus kjellanderi Luna de Carvalho, 1965
- Paussus klugii Westwood, 1838
- Paussus kochi Reichensperger, 1953
- Paussus kohli Wasmann, 1907
- Paussus kolbei Reichensperger, 1925
- Paussus komatsui Maruyama, 2016
- Paussus krelli Kaupp & Rödel, 1997
- Paussus kristenseni Reichensperger, 1913
- Paussus lacrimans Reichensperger, 1925
- Paussus laetus Gerstaecker, 1867
- Paussus laevifrons (Westwood, 1833)
- Paussus lamottei Luna de Carvalho, 1968
- Paussus lanxangensis Nagel, 2009
- Paussus laosensis Maruyama & Nagel, 2016
- Paussus laticollis Raffray, 1886
- Paussus latidens Kolbe, 1935
- Paussus latreillei Westwood, 1845
- Paussus leechi Luna de Carvalho, 1968
- Paussus leleupi Luna de Carvalho, 1968
- Paussus leroyi Wasmann, 1899
- Paussus liber Wasmann, 1899
- Paussus lineatus Thunberg, 1781
- Paussus linnaei Westwood, 1833
- Paussus linnavuori Luna de Carvalho, 1969
- Paussus lucasseni Wasmann, 1896
- Paussus ludekingii Snellen van Vollenhoven, 1872
- Paussus lusotropicalis Luna de Carvalho, 1963
- Paussus madurensis Wasmann, 1913
- Paussus malayanus Maruyama, 2016
- Paussus manicanus Péringuey, 1896
- Paussus manni Reichensperger, 1925
- Paussus marshalli Péringuey, 1896
- Paussus masaoi Maruyama, 2014
- Paussus massarti Reichensperger, 1933
- Paussus mata Maruyama, 2016
- Paussus medleri Luna de Carvalho, 1980
- Paussus mendesi (Luna de Carvalho, 2001)
- Paussus microcephalus Linnaeus, 1775
- Paussus milloti Jeannel, 1955
- Paussus milneedwardsi Raffray, 1885
- Paussus mimus Péringuey, 1897
- Paussus minor Shiraki, 1907
- Paussus minutulus Nagel & Rasool, 2019
- Paussus mirei Luna de Carvalho, 1957
- Paussus modestus Reichensperger, 1913
- Paussus moltonii Luna de Carvalho, 1959
- Paussus moreirai Luna de Carvalho, 1971
- Paussus mucius C.A.Dohrn, 1884
- Paussus multisetosus Maruyama, 2016
- Paussus murrayi Westwood, 1857
- Paussus nagahatai Maruyama, 2016
- Paussus nageli Luna de Carvalho, 1980
- Paussus nakasei Maruyama, 2016
- Paussus natalis Péringuey, 1898
- Paussus nauceras Benson, 1846
- Paussus nigrita Wasmann, 1904
- Paussus nobilis Wasmann, 1930
- Paussus nomurai Maruyama, 2016
- Paussus nudus Nagel, 1980
- Paussus oberthueri Wasmann, 1899
- Paussus obscurus Nagel, 1977
- Paussus occlusus Darlington, 1950
- Paussus oertzeni Kolbe, 1896
- Paussus olcesii Fairmaire, 1856
- Paussus opacus Kraatz, 1892
- Paussus orientalis Nagel, 1986
- Paussus overlaeti Reichensperger, 1937
- Paussus pacificus Westwood, 1855
- Paussus pallidefulvus Wasmann, 1899
- Paussus pandamanus Wasmann, 1904
- Paussus passosi Luna de Carvalho, 1963
- Paussus pasteuri Wasmann, 1896
- Paussus patrizii Gestro, 1923
- Paussus paulmuelleri Nagel, 1983
- Paussus penicillatus Raffray, 1886
- Paussus permutatus Reichensperger, 1937
- Paussus perrieri Fairmaire, 1898
- Paussus perroti Wasmann, 1899
- Paussus pierronii Fairmaire, 1880
- Paussus pilicornis Donovan, 1804
- Paussus pilosus Reichensperger, 1957
- Paussus piochardi Saulcy, 1874
- Paussus pipitzi C.A.Dohrn, 1884
- Paussus planicollis Raffray, 1885
- Paussus planicornis Wasmann, 1922
- Paussus planifrons Fairmaire, 1899
- Paussus ploiophorus Benson, 1846
- Paussus politus Westwood, 1850
- Paussus prestesjoannesi Luna de Carvalho, 1974
- Paussus pretoriensis Brauns, 1925
- Paussus procerus Gerstaecker, 1867
- Paussus propinquus Péringuey, 1888
- Paussus pseudocucullatus Nagel, 1983
- Paussus pseudoklugi Luna de Carvalho, 1963
- Paussus pseudosetosus Nagel, 1977
- Paussus quadratidens Wasmann, 1904
- Paussus quadricornis Wasmann, 1899
- Paussus raffrayi Péringuey, 1896
- Paussus rawlinsi Nagel, 2006
- Paussus recorpus Nagel, 1986
- Paussus recticornis Raffray, 1886
- Paussus reductus Reichensperger, 1937
- Paussus reichenspergeri (Luna de Carvalho, 1959)
- Paussus ricardojorgei Luna de Carvalho, 1951
- Paussus ritsemae Wasmann, 1896
- Paussus roeri (Luna de Carvalho, 1989)
- Paussus roslii Maruyama, 2016
- Paussus rougemonti Luna de Carvalho, 1974
- Paussus rougemontianus Lorenz, 1998
- Paussus ruber Thunberg, 1781
- Paussus rufitarsis Westwood, 1833
- Paussus rugiceps Péringuey, 1888
- Paussus rugosus Raffray, 1886
- Paussus rusticus Péringuey, 1885
- Paussus sankuruensis Reichensperger, 1930
- Paussus saundersii Westwood, 1841
- Paussus sauteri Wasmann, 1912
- Paussus scaliger Reichensperger, 1926
- Paussus schaumii Westwood, 1852
- Paussus schiodtii Westwood, 1874
- Paussus schoutedeni Reichensperger, 1933
- Paussus scorteccii Luna de Carvalho, 1959
- Paussus scyphus Raffray, 1886
- Paussus sebakuanus (Péringuey, 1904)
- Paussus semicucullatus Brauns, 1899
- Paussus semilineatus Wasmann, 1899
- Paussus semirufus Wasmann, 1899
- Paussus seriesetosus Wasmann, 1904
- Paussus serraticornis Nagel & Bednarik, 2013
- Paussus serratulus Reichensperger, 1927
- Paussus sesquisulcatus Wasmann, 1899
- Paussus setosus Westwood, 1850
- Paussus sewelli Ribeiro, 1930
- Paussus seydeli Reichensperger, 1937
- Paussus seyriganus Jeannel, 1946
- Paussus seyrigi Reichensperger, 1936
- Paussus shuckardi Westwood, 1838
- Paussus siamensis Maruyama, 2016
- Paussus sicardi Jeannel, 1946
- Paussus signatipennis Péringuey, 1885
- Paussus sikoranus C.A.Dohrn, 1890
- Paussus simplicissimus Janssens, 1956
- Paussus soleatus Wasmann, 1894
- Paussus solidus Reichensperger, 1936
- Paussus somaliae Reichensperger, 1953
- Paussus spencii Westwood, 1864
- Paussus sphaerocerus Afzelius, 1798
- Paussus spiniceps Wasmann, 1904
- Paussus spinicola Wasmann, 1892
- Paussus spinicoxis Westwood, 1850
- Paussus spinolae Gestro, 1901
- Paussus squamicornis Wasmann, 1922
- Paussus stevensianus Westwood, 1842
- Paussus stolzi Kolbe, 1926
- Paussus striaticornis Luna de Carvalho, 1966
- Paussus suahelinus Reichensperger, 1930
- Paussus suavis Wasmann, 1894
- Paussus subarcuatus Reichensperger, 1932
- Paussus subglaber Maruyama, 2016
- Paussus sumateranus Maruyama, 2016
- Paussus tagalicus Gestro, 1919
- Paussus tchadensis Luna de Carvalho, 1957
- Paussus telescopifer Wasmann, 1922
- Paussus tenuiculus Luna de Carvalho, 1959
- Paussus tenuis Reichensperger, 1925
- Paussus testaceus Fowler, 1912
- Paussus thomsonii Reiche, 1860
- Paussus thoracicus Donovan, 1804
- Paussus tibialis Westwood, 1841
- Paussus tigrinus Gestro, 1901
- Paussus tristis Wasmann, 1912
- Paussus tununguensis Reichensperger, 1933
- Paussus turcicus I.Frivaldszky von Frivald, 1835
- Paussus uelensis (Reichensperger, 1925)
- Paussus upembanus Janssens, 1951
- Paussus vadoni Jeannel, 1946
- Paussus vanrooni Wasmann, 1922
- Paussus verticalis Reiche, 1847
- Paussus vexator Péringuey, 1898
- Paussus viator Péringuey, 1896
- Paussus vollenhovii Westwood, 1874
- Paussus wasmanni Kraatz, 1894
- Paussus watarui Maruyama, 2016
- Paussus waterhousei Westwood, 1874
- Paussus wellmani Wasmann, 1907
- Paussus wittei Maruyama, 2016
- Paussus woerdeni Ritsema, 1876
- Paussus wroughtoni Wasmann, 1894
- Paussus yasutoshii Maruyama, 2016
- Paussus ypsilopilos Luna de Carvalho, 1966
- Paussus yubaki Nagel, 2018
- Paussus zhouchaoi Wang, 2017
