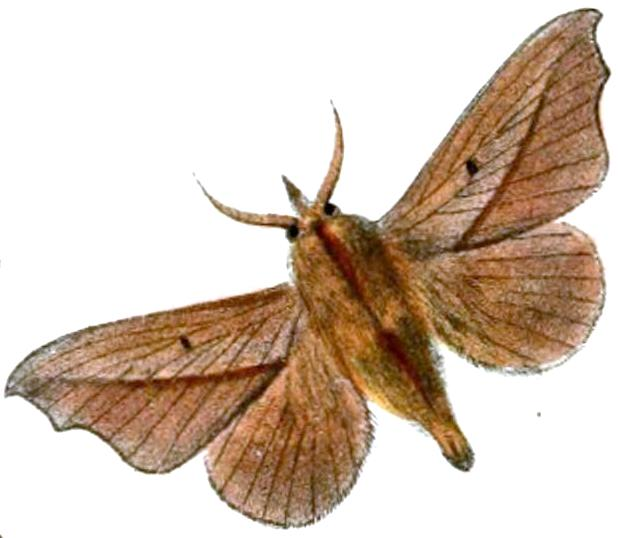
- Bharetta cinnamomea

Scientific classification
- Kingdom: Animalia
- Phylum: Arthropoda
- Class: Insecta
- Order: Lepidoptera
- Family: Lasiocampidae
- Genus: Bharetta; Moore, 1866

= Bharetta =

Genus of moths

Bharetta is a genus of moths in the family Lasiocampidae. The genus was erected by Moore in 1866.

== Selected species ==
- Bharetta bidens Zerny, 1928
- Bharetta cinnamomea Moore, 1866
- Bharetta flammans Hampson, 1892
- Bharetta owadai Kishida, 1986
