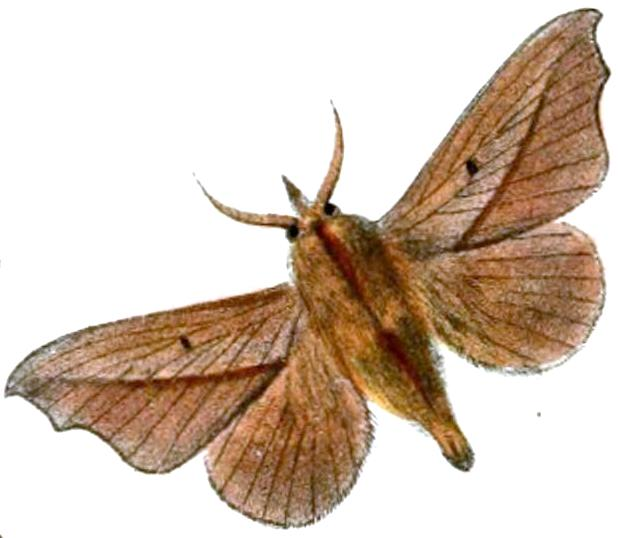

Scientific classification
- Kingdom: Animalia
- Phylum: Arthropoda
- Class: Insecta
- Order: Lepidoptera
- Family: Lasiocampidae
- Genus: Bharetta
- Species: B. cinnamomea

Binomial name
- Bharetta cinnamomea Moore, [1866]

= Bharetta cinnamomea =

Species of moth

Bharetta cinnamomea is a species of moth of the family Lasiocampidae. It is found in China, Bhutan and India.
