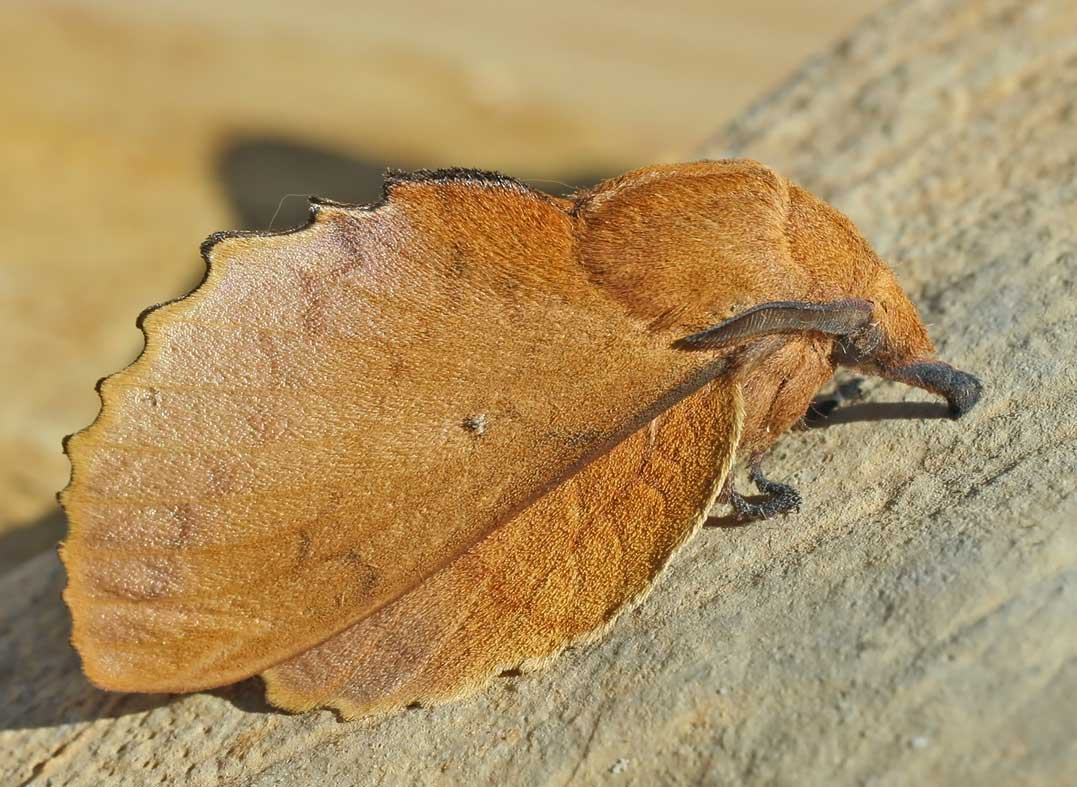
- Gastropacha quercifolia

Scientific classification
- Kingdom: Animalia
- Phylum: Arthropoda
- Clade: Pancrustacea
- Class: Insecta
- Order: Lepidoptera
- Family: Lasiocampidae
- Subfamily: Gastropachinae; Neumoegen & Dyar, 1894

= Gastropachinae =

Subfamily of moths

Gastropachinae is a subfamily of the moth family Lasiocampidae. It was first described by Berthold Neumoegen and Harrison Gray Dyar Jr. 1894.

This subfamily is distinguished form other Lasiocampidae by the adapted trait of an expanded humeral cell, and the presence of humeral veins.

== Genera ==
- Gastropacha Ochsenheimer, 1816
- Heteropacha Harvey, 1874
- Odonestis Germar, 1812
- Pernattia Fletcher, 1982
- Phyllodesma Hübner, [1820]
