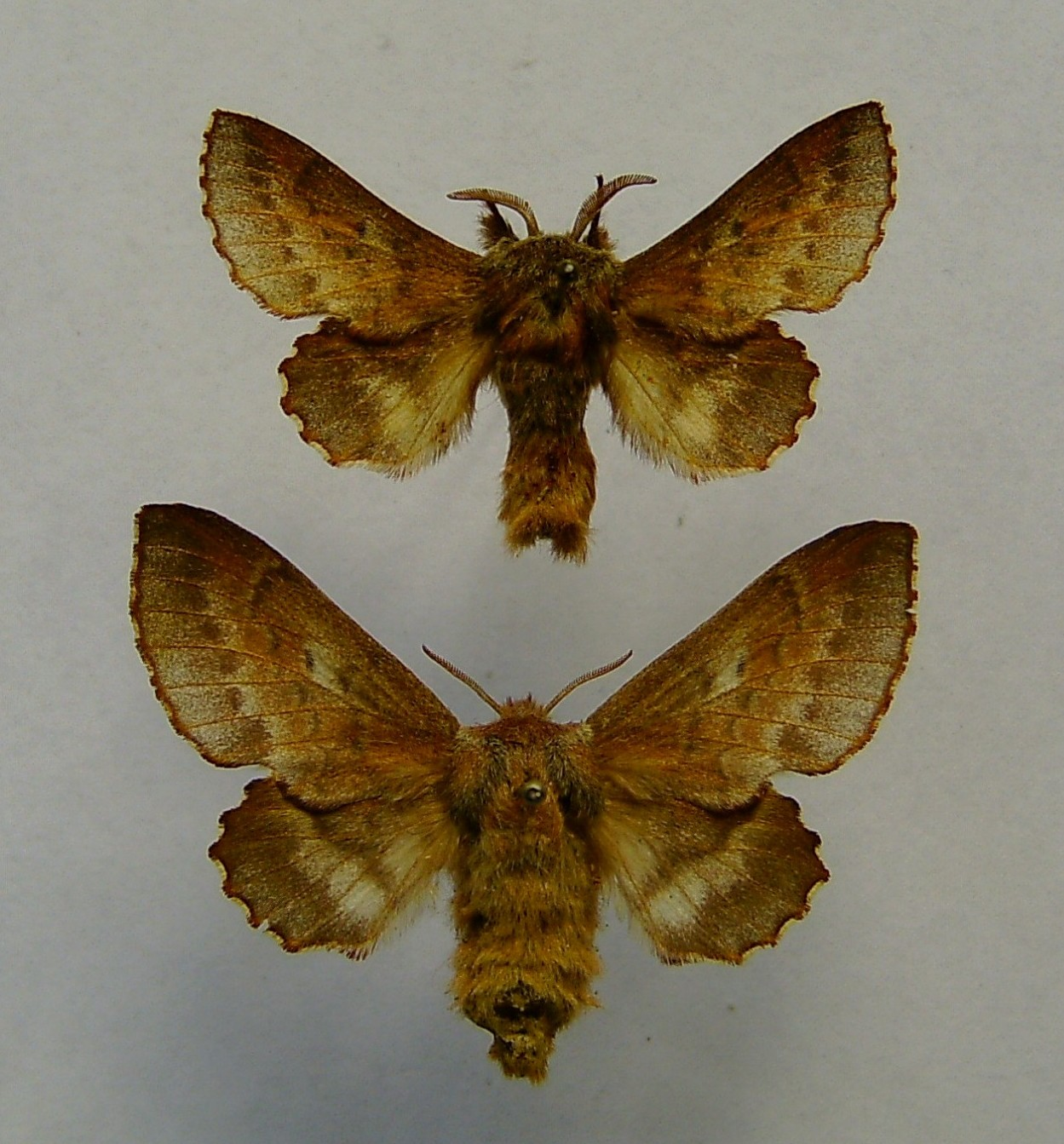

Conservation status
- Vulnerable (IUCN 2.3)

Scientific classification
- Kingdom: Animalia
- Phylum: Arthropoda
- Clade: Pancrustacea
- Class: Insecta
- Order: Lepidoptera
- Family: Lasiocampidae
- Genus: Phyllodesma
- Species: P. ilicifolia

Binomial name
- Phyllodesma ilicifolia (Linnaeus, 1758)

Synonyms
- Phyllodesma ilicifolium; Epicnaptera ilicifolia

= Small lappet moth =

Species of moth

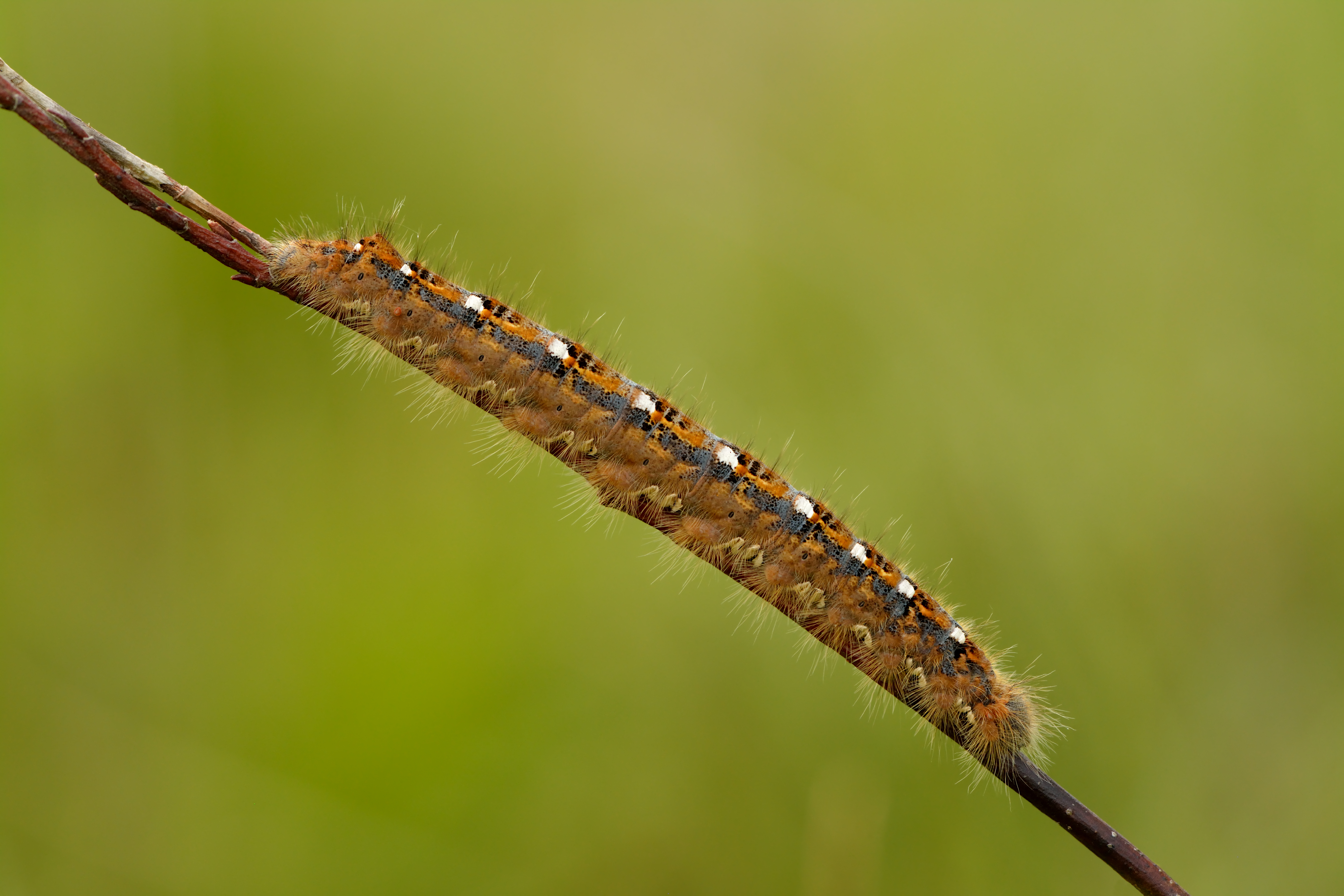
Caterpillar

The small lappet moth (Phyllodesma ilicifolia) is a moth in the family Lasiocampidae. The species was first described by Carl Linnaeus in his 1758 10th edition of Systema Naturae. It is found throughout Europe and parts of Asia.

== Description ==
From Meyrick L. 35–40 mm. Forewings with 9 to apex; brownish-ferruginous, slightly whitish-sprinkled; first and second lines dark grey, waved, interrupted, curved near costa; a dark grey discal mark, preceded by a whitish suffusion; a broad terminal band of whitish irroration, including a darker interrupted line, not reaching costa; cilia white, barred with dark ferruginous. Hindwings purplish-fuscous; two suffused whitish bands; 8 connected with 7, with one or two pseudoneuria. Larva grey or reddish, hairs reddish; dorsal line black, interrupted with reddish, edged with whitish; lateral blue-grey, interrupted.

== Distribution and habitat ==
The moth is found in Austria, Belarus, Belgium, China, Czech Republic, Denmark, Estonia, Finland, France, Germany, Italy, Malta, Japan, Kazakhstan, Latvia, Lithuania, Mongolia, Norway, Poland, Romania, Russia, Slovakia, Spain, Sweden, Switzerland, and Ukraine.

Its local extinction in the United Kingdom is considered "probable".

== Life cycle and behaviour ==
The larva feeds on Vaccinium and Salix and hibernates as a pupa within a cocoon. The adult emerges in spring, flies at night in summer and lays its eggs in batches.

== See also ==
- Gastropacha quercifolia (lappet moth)
