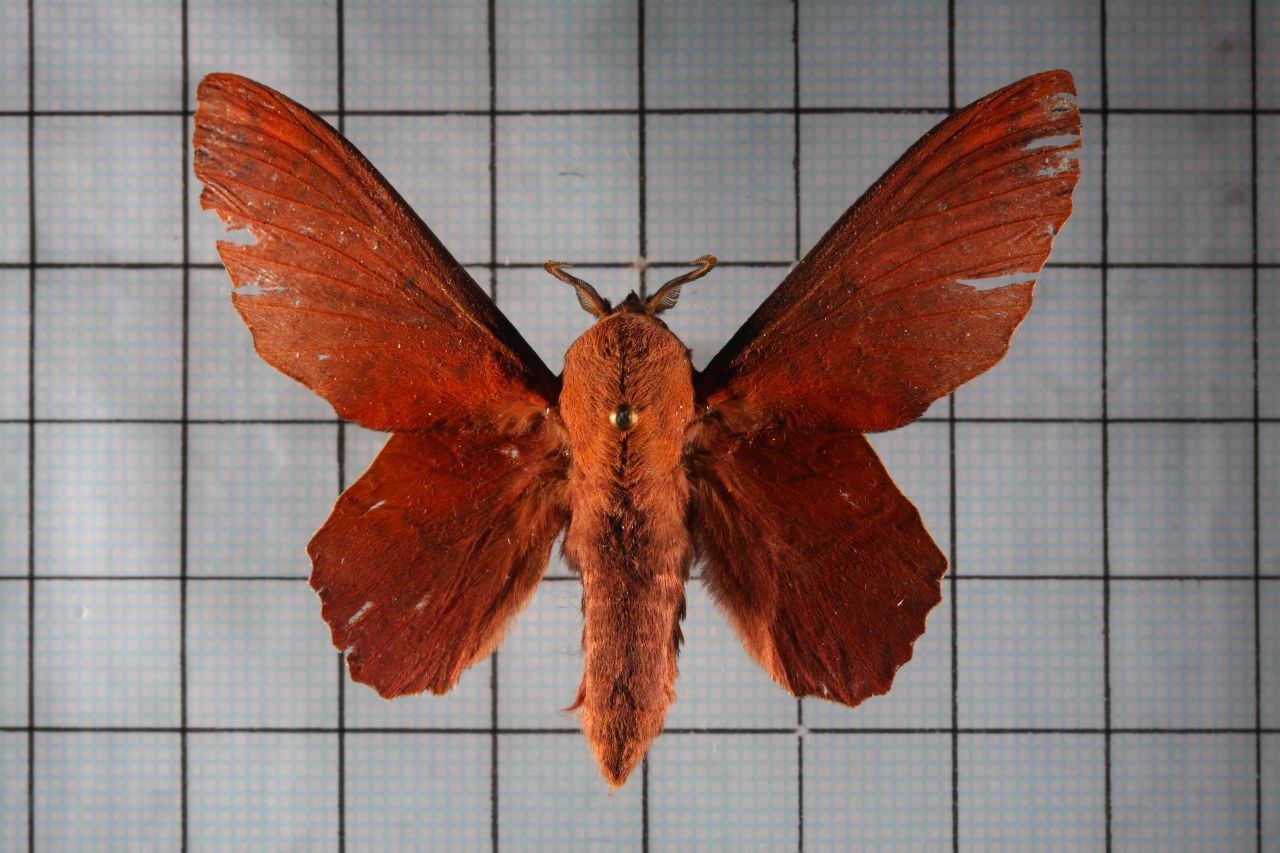

Scientific classification
- Kingdom: Animalia
- Phylum: Arthropoda
- Clade: Pancrustacea
- Class: Insecta
- Order: Lepidoptera
- Family: Lasiocampidae
- Genus: Gastropacha
- Species: G. sikkima

Binomial name
- Gastropacha sikkima Moore, 1879

Synonyms
- Stenophylloides sikkima (Moore, 1879)

= Gastropacha sikkima =

Species of moth

Gastropacha sikkima is a moth in the family Lasiocampidae. It is found in Nepal, Northeast India (Darjeeling, Sikkim), and northern Thailand.
