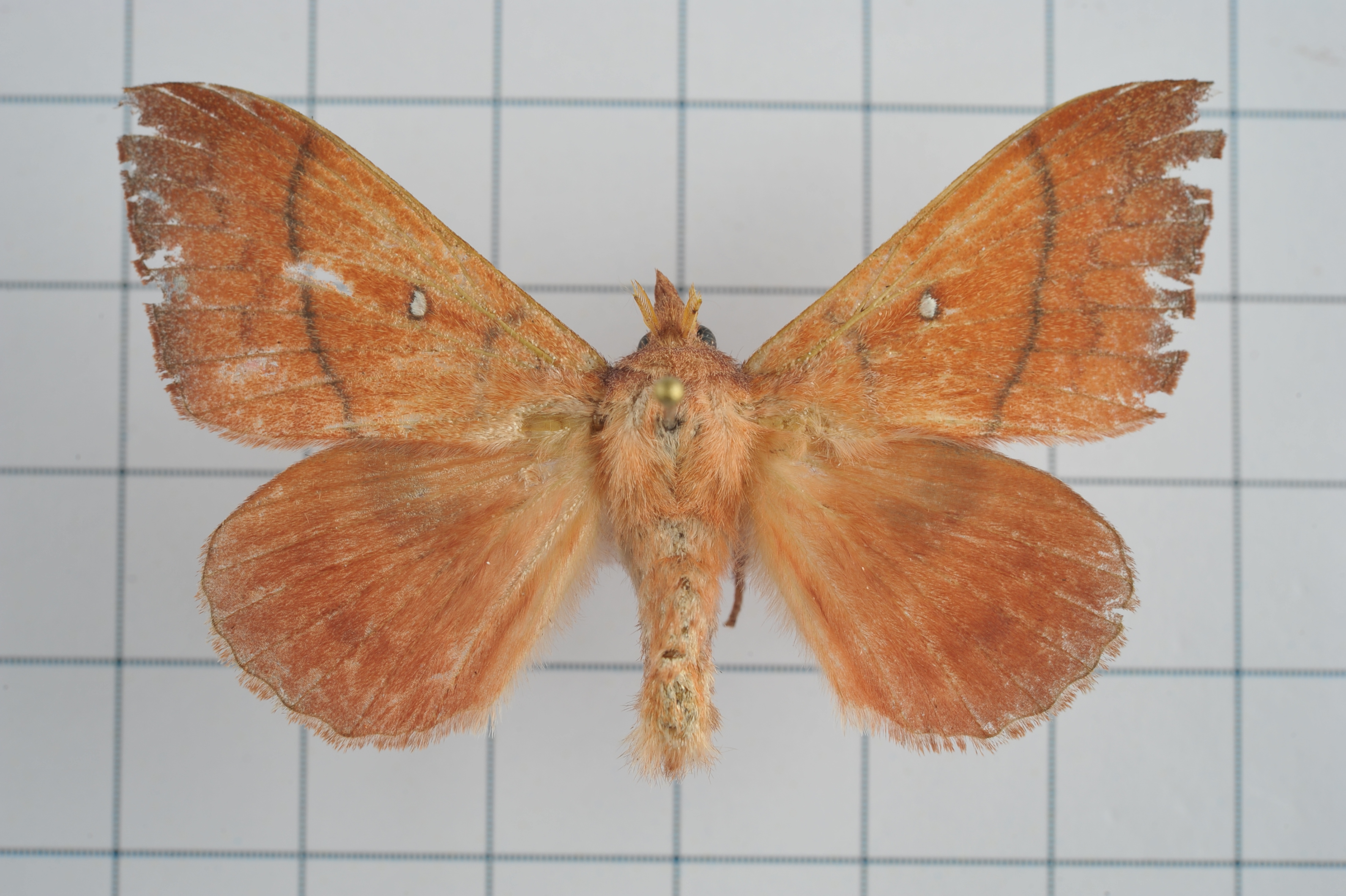

Scientific classification
- Domain: Eukaryota
- Kingdom: Animalia
- Phylum: Arthropoda
- Class: Insecta
- Order: Lepidoptera
- Family: Lasiocampidae
- Genus: Odonestis
- Species: O. bheroba

Binomial name
- Odonestis bheroba Moore, 1858/59

Synonyms
- Odonestis vita Moore, in Horsfield & Moore, 1859; Odonestis vita Moore; Tams, 1935

= Odonestis bheroba =

Species of moth

Odonestis bheroba is a moth of the family Lasiocampidae first described by Frederic Moore in 1858.

== Distribution ==
It is found from Sri Lanka to northern India, Nepal, northern Vietnam, northern Thailand, southern and eastern China, Myanmar and Taiwan.

== Description ==
Body dark orange red. Forewings are almost triangular with a bluish or greyish suffused external margin. Postmedial fascia of forewing is strong. White discal spot and the fasciae are distinct which is mostly flecked with dark scales. Hindwings are darker. Caterpillars are known to feed on Melastoma normale, Rubus species and other Melastoma species.

== Subspecies ==
Two subspecies are recognized.

Subspecies	Distribution	Wingspan	Larval food plants
Odonestis bheroba formosae (Wileman, 1910)	Taiwan and coastal forests of eastern China (Jiangxi, Fujian)		Quercus species and fruit trees
Odonestis bheroba bheroba Moore, 1858-1859	Northern India, Nepal, southern and eastern China (Zhejiang, Shaanxi, Jiangxi, Fujian, Chekiang, Guangxi, Hainan, Sichuan, Yunnan, Hainan), northern Thailand, northern Vietnam, Myanmar, Sri Lanka	39–43 mm in male 56–58 mm in female	Melastoma normale, Rubus species, in captivity is as polyphagous as O. pruni and accepts European Salix, Quercus, Prunus, Sorbus and Malus
