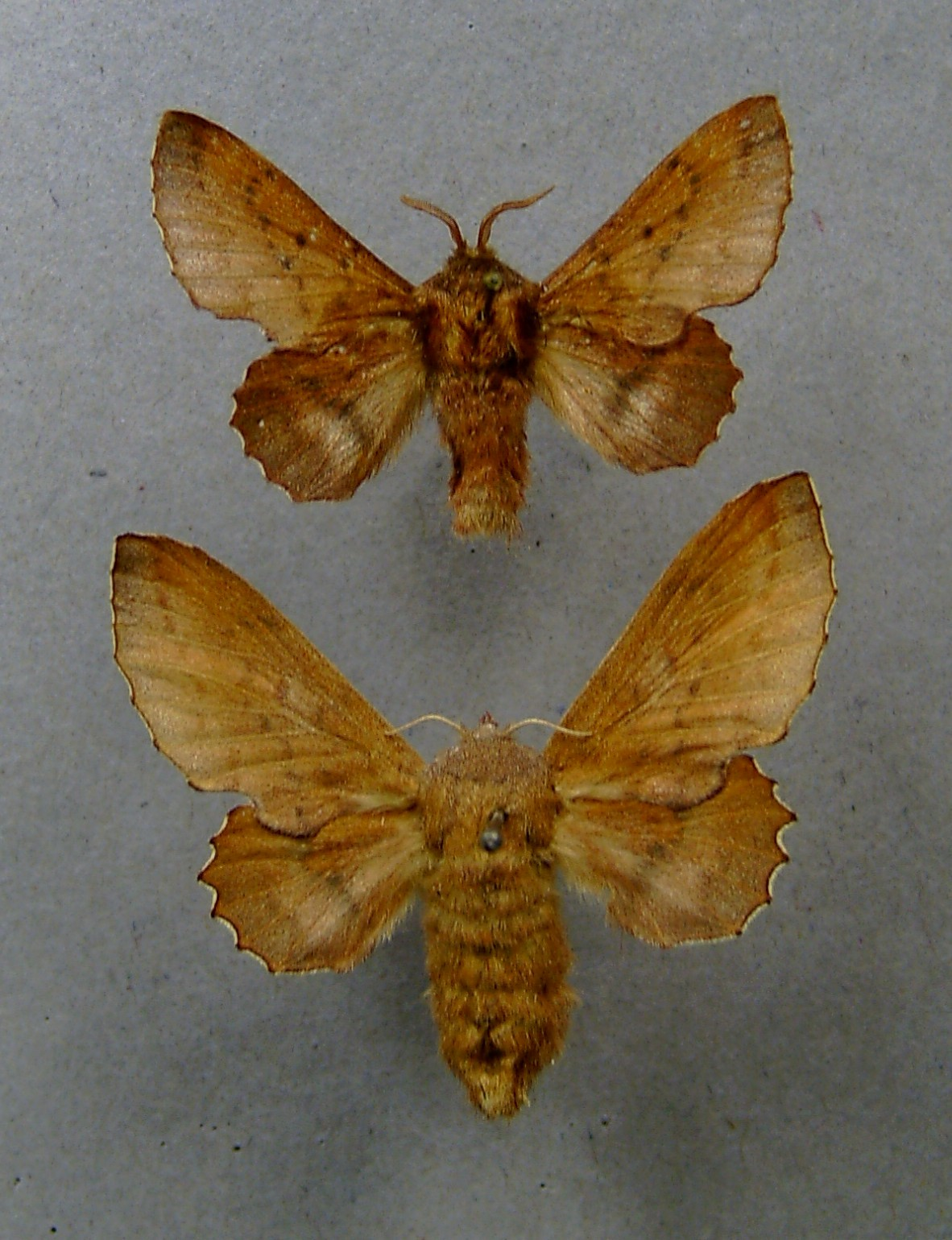
- Male (top), Female (bottom)

Scientific classification
- Kingdom: Animalia
- Phylum: Arthropoda
- Clade: Pancrustacea
- Class: Insecta
- Order: Lepidoptera
- Family: Lasiocampidae
- Genus: Phyllodesma
- Species: P. tremulifolium

Binomial name
- Phyllodesma tremulifolium (Hübner, 1810)

= Phyllodesma tremulifolium =

Species of moth

Phyllodesma tremulifolium, the aspen lappet, is a moth of the family Lasiocampidae. It is found in Europe.

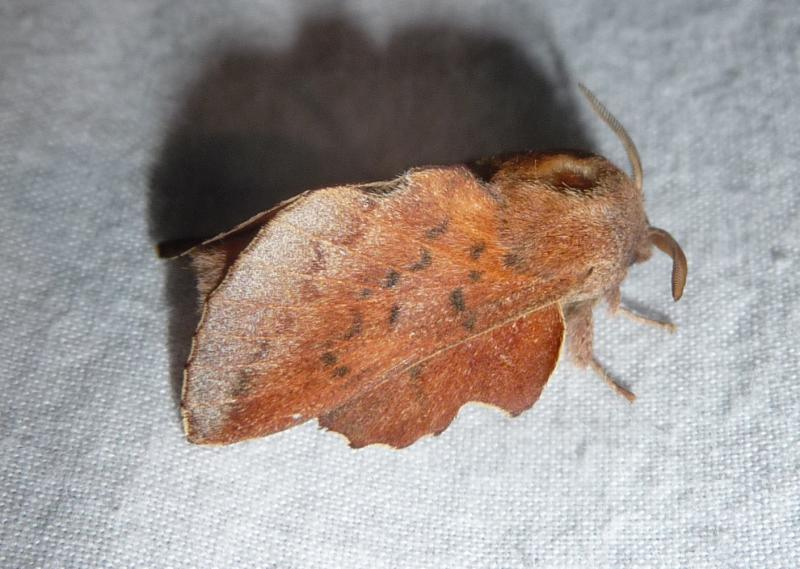

The length of the forewings is 15–18 mm for the males and 18–20 mm for the females. The moth flies from April to July depending on the location.

The larvae feed on various deciduous trees, such as oak, poplar and birch.
