= Odonestis ceylonica =

Scientific classification
- Domain: Eukaryota
- Kingdom: Animalia
- Phylum: Arthropoda
- Class: Insecta
- Order: Lepidoptera
- Family: Lasiocampidae
- Genus: Odonestis
- Species: O. ceylonica

Binomial name
- Odonestis ceylonica Tams, 1935

Species of moth

Odonestis ceylonica is a moth of the family Lasiocampidae first described by Willie Horace Thomas Tams in 1935. It is found in Sri Lanka and southern India.

== Taxonomy and description ==
The species was once considered to be a subspecies of the widely distributed Odonestis vita. Its wingspan is 36–43 mm in the male, whereas the female is much larger with a wingspan of 56–58 mm. Length of male is 20 mm and female is 27 mm. Ground colour is light orange reddish, with light lilac saturation and indistinct slender wing pattern. The white discal spot and the fasciae are also indistinct.
