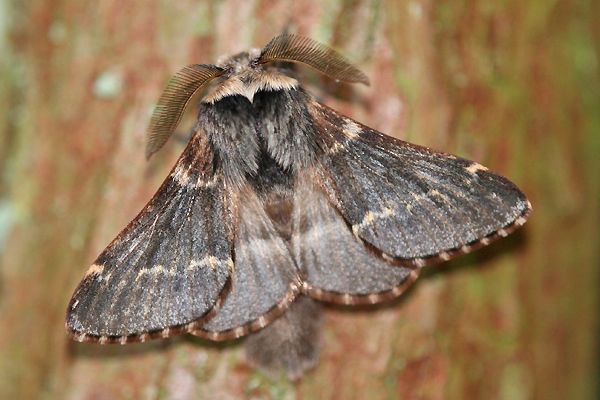
- Poecilocampa populi, ♂, dorsal view

Scientific classification
- Kingdom: Animalia
- Phylum: Arthropoda
- Class: Insecta
- Order: Lepidoptera
- Family: Lasiocampidae
- Genus: Poecilocampa
- Species: P. populi

Binomial name
- Poecilocampa populi (Linnaeus, 1758)

= Poecilocampa populi =

Species of moth

Poecilocampa populi, the December moth, is a moth of the family Lasiocampidae.

== Description ==
The wingspan is 35–45 millimetres (1.4–1.8 in). The moth flies from October to December depending on the location.

The larvae feed on various deciduous trees, such as oak, poplar and lime (Tilia).

It is considered a pest insect, as the larvae will eat apple and plum trees.

== Distribution ==
It is found in Europe, Northern Asia and Japan.

== Gallery ==
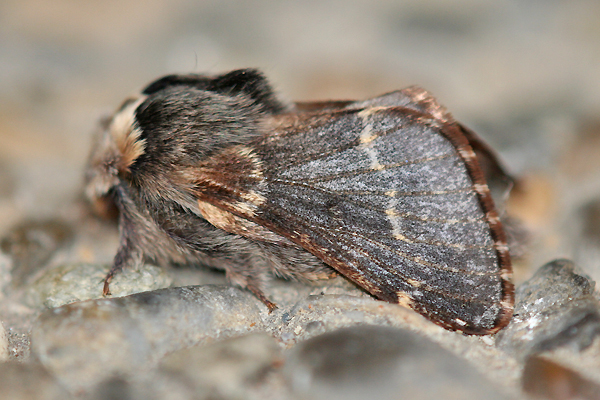
Side view of Poecilocampa populi, ♂

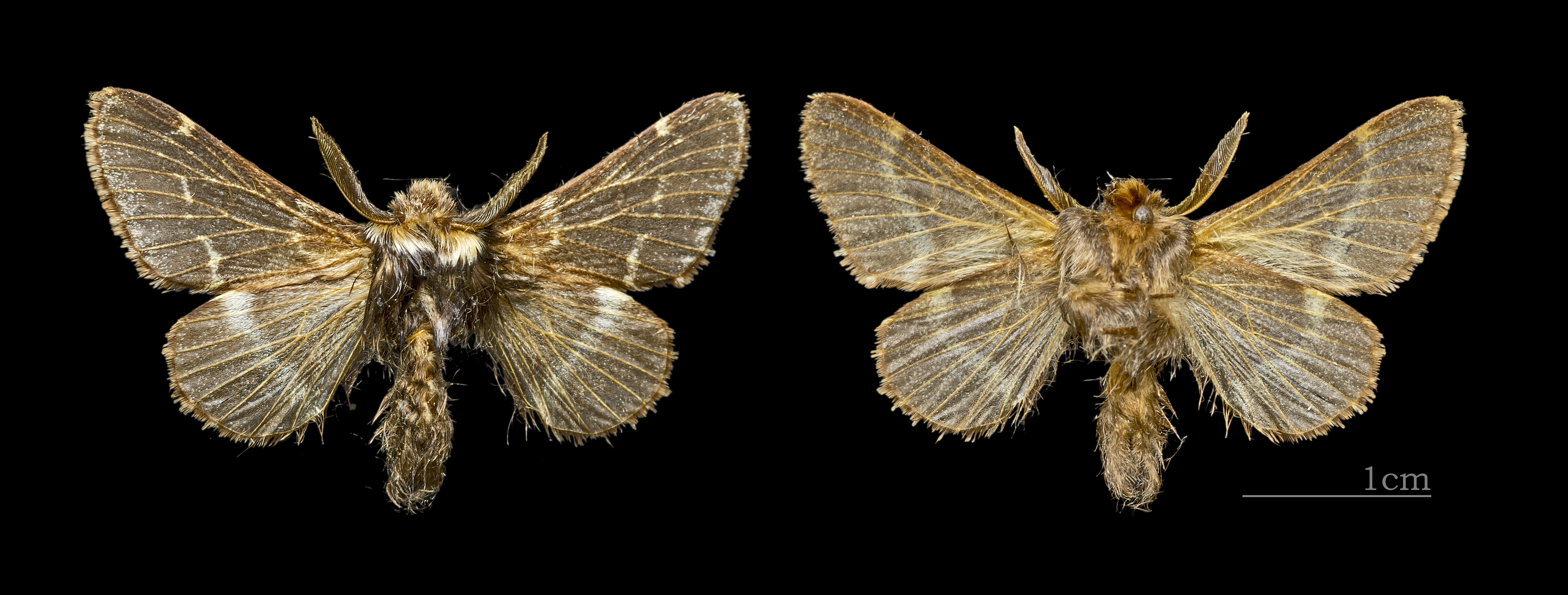
Both side mounted specimen ♂

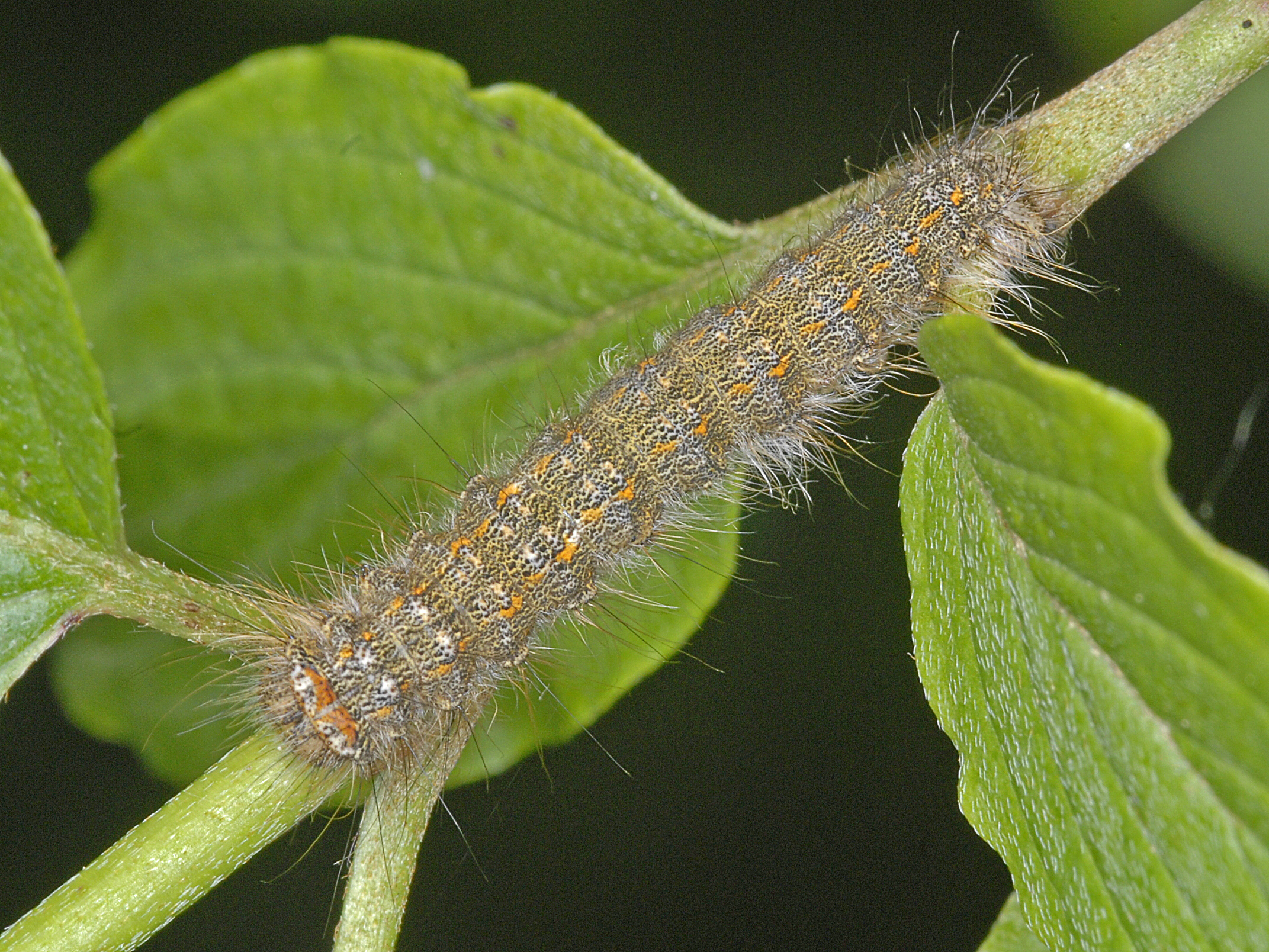
Caterpillar of Poecilocampa populi, dorsal view

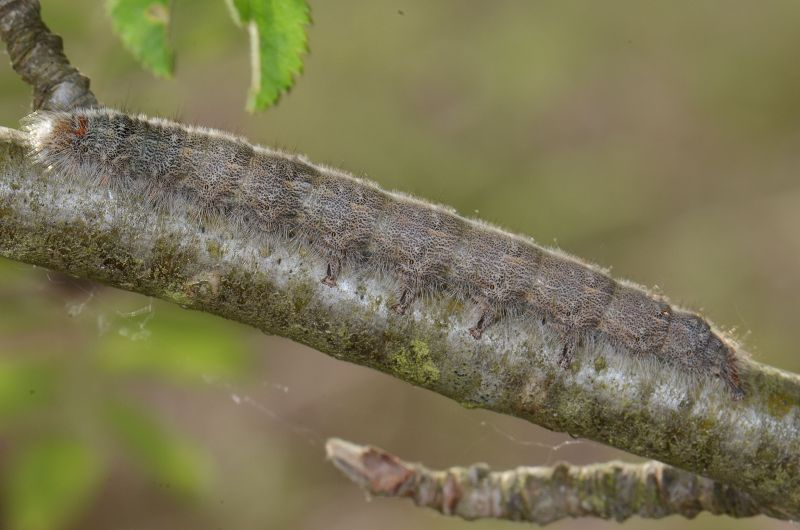
Caterpillar of Poecilocampa populi, side view

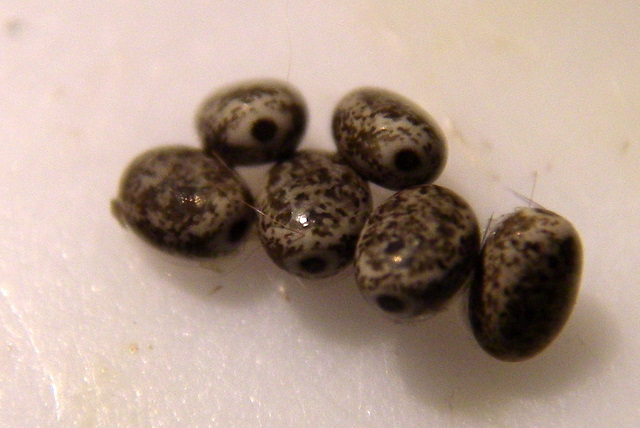
Eggs of Poecilocampa populi
