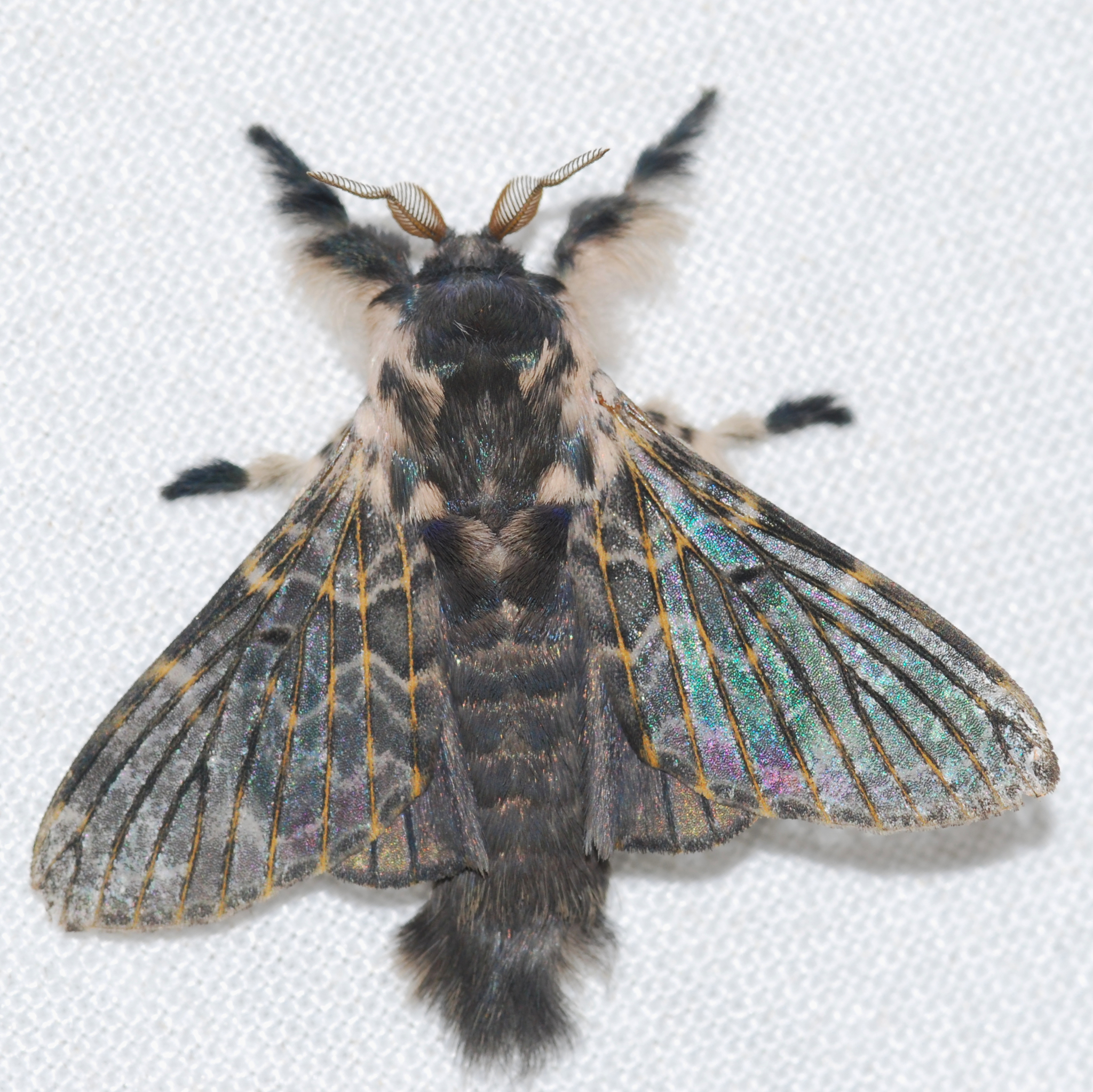
- Tolype primitiva

Scientific classification
- Kingdom: Animalia
- Phylum: Arthropoda
- Clade: Pancrustacea
- Class: Insecta
- Order: Lepidoptera
- Family: Lasiocampidae
- Subfamily: Poecilocampinae
- Tribe: Macromphaliini
- Genus: Tolype; Hübner, [1820]

Synonyms
- Planosa Fitch, 1856

= Tolype =

Genus of moths

Tolype is a genus of moths in the family Lasiocampidae. The genus was erected by Jacob Hübner in 1820. The name derives from Ancient Greek τολυπη (tolypē), 'ball of wool,' referring to their fluffy hairs.

== Tolype species ==
- Tolype abdan Schaus, 1924
- Tolype abstersa Felder, 1874
- Tolype adolla Dyar, 1911
- Tolype adventitia Draudt, 1927
- Tolype albiapicata Schaus, 1915
- Tolype albula Druce, 1897
- Tolype alegra Dognin, 1922
- Tolype aroana Schaus, 1906
- Tolype austella Franclemont, 1973
- Tolype biapicata Dognin, 1912
- Tolype bipunctata Giacomelli, 1911
- Tolype caieta Druce, 1897
- Tolype castralia Jones, 1912
- Tolype catharina Draudt, 1927
- Tolype celeste Dyar, 1911
- Tolype cinella Schaus, 1906
- Tolype columbiana Schaus, 1906
- Tolype cupriflua Draudt, 1927
- Tolype cydona Schaus, 1936
- Tolype damnata Schaus, 1936
- Tolype dayi Blackmore, 1921 (Day's lappet moth)
- Tolype denormata Draudt, 1927
- Tolype disciplaga Draudt, 1927
- Tolype distincta French, 1890
- Tolype dollia Dyar, 1911
- Tolype dulcis Draudt, 1927
- Tolype dyari Draudt, 1927
- Tolype effesa Draudt, 1927
- Tolype egena Draudt, 1927
- Tolype erisa Schaus, 1936
- Tolype fasciatus Druce, 1906
- Tolype ferrugo Draudt, 1927
- Tolype flexivia Dognin, 1916
- Tolype frenata Schaus, 1936
- Tolype fumosa Dognin, 1905
- Tolype gelima Schaus, 1906
- Tolype gelnwoodi Barnes, 1900
- Tolype glenwoodii
- Tolype guentheri Berg, 1883
- Tolype hella Herrich-Schäffer, 1854
- Tolype incerta Dognin, 1905
- Tolype indecisa Walker, 1855
- Tolype innocens Burmeister, 1878
- Tolype intercalaris Draudt, 1927
- Tolype interstriata Dognin, 1912
- Tolype iridescens Walker, 1865
- Tolype janeirensis Schaus, 1936
- Tolype lanuginosa Schaus, 1896
- Tolype laricis (Fitch, 1856) (larch tolype)
- Tolype lasthenioides Dognin, 1912
- Tolype lemoulti Schaus, 1910
- Tolype loisa Schaus, 1940
- Tolype lowriei Barnes & McDunnough, 1918
- Tolype magnidiscata Dognin, 1916
- Tolype marynita Schaus, 1936
- Tolype mayelisae Franclemont, 1973
- Tolype medialis Jones, 1912
- Tolype mediocris Draudt, 1927
- Tolype melascens Schaus, 1936
- Tolype meridensis Dognin, 1912
- Tolype minta Dyar, 1927 (southern tolype moth)
- Tolype miscella Dognin, 1916
- Tolype mollifacta Dyar, 1926
- Tolype mota Dyar, 1911
- Tolype nana Druce, 1887
- Tolype nebulosa Schaus, 1906
- Tolype nigra Dognin, 1916
- Tolype nigribarbata Dognin, 1912
- Tolype nigricaria Cassino, 1928
- Tolype nigripuncta Schaus, 1906
- Tolype notialis Franclemont, 1973 (small tolype)
- Tolype nuera Dognin, 1894
- Tolype obscura Dognin, 1923
- Tolype pauperata Burmeister, 1878
- Tolype pellita Draudt, 1927
- Tolype pelochroa Berg, 1883
- Tolype perplexa Schaus, 1912
- Tolype peruviana Dognin, 1916
- Tolype phyllus Druce, 1897
- Tolype picta Felder, 1874
- Tolype poggia Schaus, 1906
- Tolype praepoggia Dognin, 1916
- Tolype primitiva
- Tolype pulla Draudt, 1927
- Tolype quiescens Schaus, 1936
- Tolype regina Dognin, 1912
- Tolype salvadora Dognin, 1912
- Tolype scaenica Draudt, 1927
- Tolype serralta Jones, 1912
- Tolype silveria Cramer, 1781
- Tolype simulans Walker, 1855
- Tolype songoaria Schaus, 1936
- Tolype sorex Draudt, 1927
- Tolype suffusa Jones, 1912
- Tolype tarudina Draudt, 1927
- Tolype tenebrosa Walker, 1855
- Tolype tolteca Neumoegen, 1892
- Tolype undulosa Walker, 1855
- Tolype velleda (Stoll, 1791) (large tolype)
- Tolype ventriosa Draudt, 1927
- Tolype vespertilio Draudt, 1927
- Tolype villanea Dognin, 1897
- Tolype viuda Schaus, 1924
