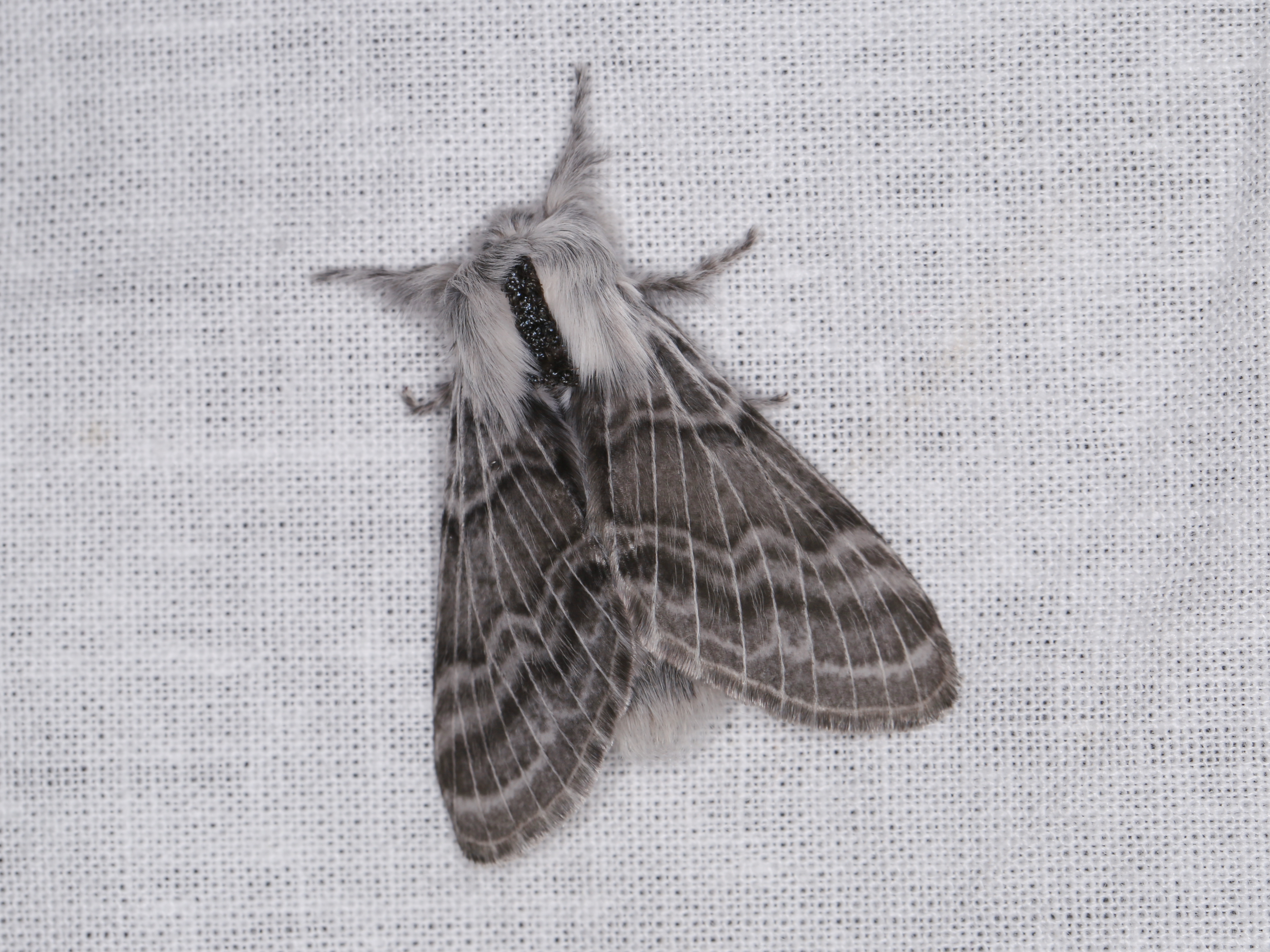
- Image of Tolype distincta

Scientific classification
- Kingdom: Animalia
- Phylum: Arthropoda
- Class: Insecta
- Order: Lepidoptera
- Family: Lasiocampidae
- Genus: Tolype
- Species: T. distincta

Binomial name
- Tolype distincta French, 1890

= Tolype distincta =

Species of moth

Tolype distincta is a species of moth in the family Lasiocampidae native to western North America.

== Distribution and habitat ==
The species is found in moist to mesic coniferous forests from the Pacific Northwest to the Southwestern United States, and its range extends as far east as the Rocky Mountains in Colorado.

== Life history ==
=== Larvae ===
Larvae feed on conifers in the family PInaceae, such as Douglas fir (Pseudotsuga menziesii), true firs (Abies sp.), and western hemlock (Tsuga heterophylla).
