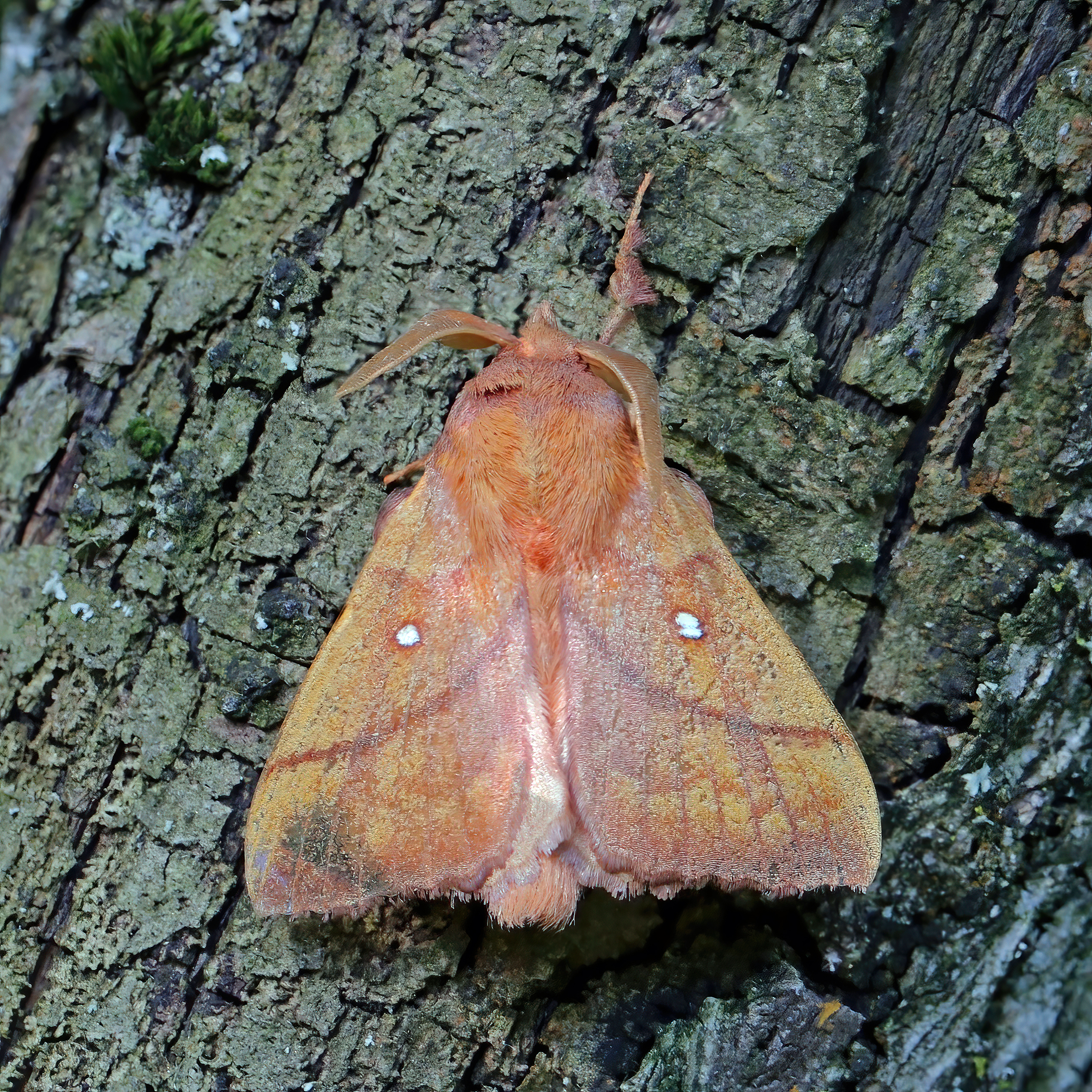
- In Hungary

Scientific classification
- Kingdom: Animalia
- Phylum: Arthropoda
- Clade: Pancrustacea
- Class: Insecta
- Order: Lepidoptera
- Family: Lasiocampidae
- Genus: Odonestis
- Species: O. pruni

Binomial name
- Odonestis pruni (Linnaeus, 1758)

= Odonestis pruni =

Species of moth

Odonestis pruni, also known as the plum lappet moth or the plum eggar, is a species of moth native to Eurasia. It was first described by Carl Linnaeus in 1758 and belongs to the family Lasiocampidae.

== Description ==
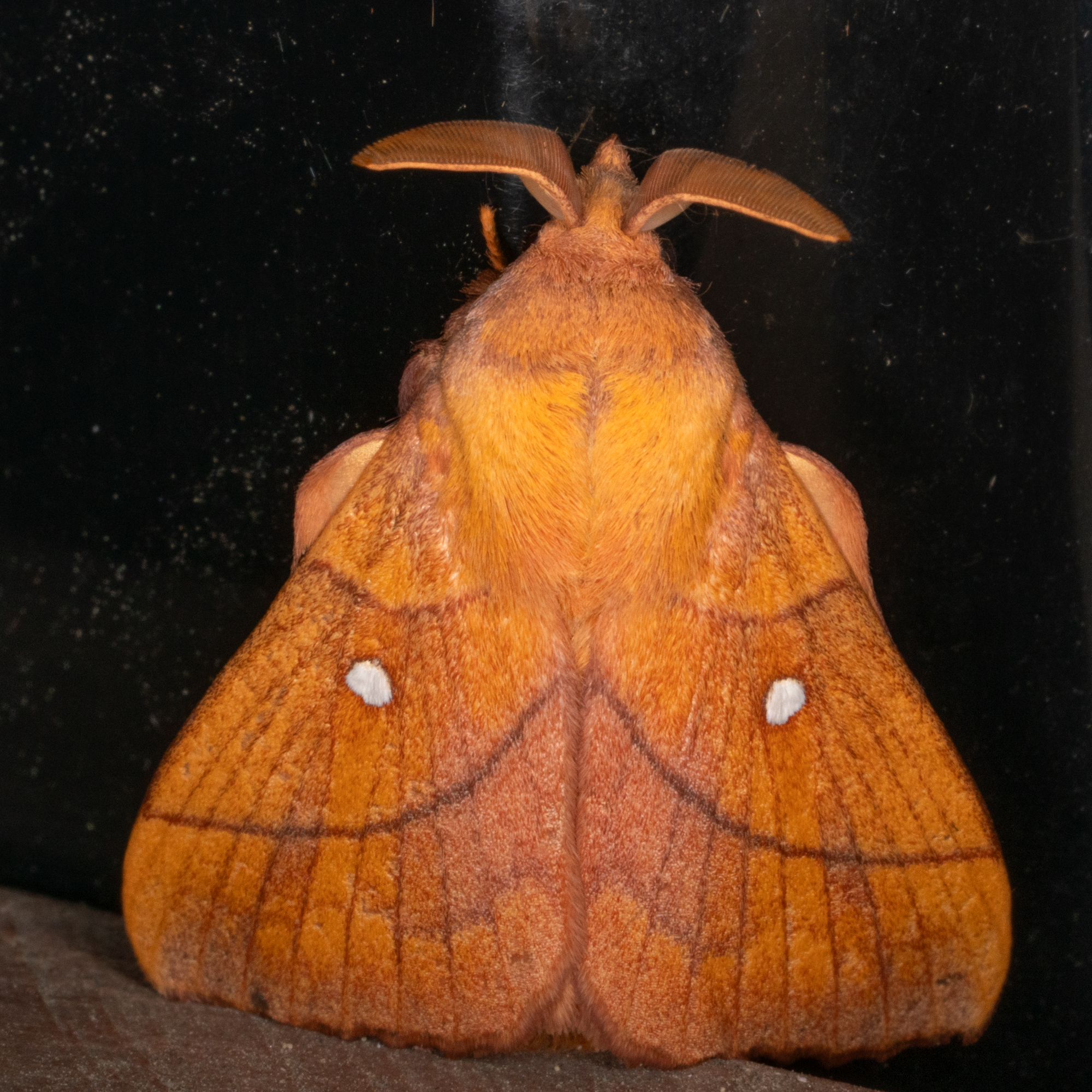
Odonestis pruni pruni in Poland

The wing colour ranges between yellow and orange, with reddish and brownish markings. On each forewing, there is a distinct white dot in the centre, near which lie two darker bands. Its wingspan is variably described as between 20-30mm or 40-60 mm. Males are paler than females and, like other members of the genus, smaller.

The caterpillar is between 45mm and 70mm long, with a blueish-grey body, brown head and golden lines running up the length of its body. It also may have grey or golden spots.

== Taxonomy ==
The moth was first described in 1758 by Carl Linnaeus in his 10th edition of the Systema Naturae. It was originally described as bombyx pruni, though later reclassified in 1812 as the sole member and type species of the newly-constructed odonestis genus.

== Range ==
The plum lappet moth has been found across its native Eurasia, and is distributed across the continent from Japan to central Europe. It not found in South or Southeast Asia.

== Life history ==
=== Life cycle ===
It lays eggs as either small clusters or individuals. These eggs hatch in either fall or later summer and the larvae will survive through the winter and resume growing in the spring and early summer. After that, the caterpillars will enter a cocoon as they pupate into fully-grown moths. Depending on the location of the moth population, they will produce between one and two broods a year.

== Genetics ==
=== Subspecies ===
As a result of this specie's wide geographic distribution, there are several known subspecies of this moth.

- Odonestis pruni pruni is distributed across Europe and Russia. It is the palest subspecies, but a darker variant is known to exist in Sardinia and Corsica.
- Odonestis pruni rufescens, previously also described as Odonestis pruni japonensis, is distributed across eastern Russia, Japan, China, Korea, Taiwan, and Vietnam. It is a darker subspecies. In 1928, odonestis pruni japonensis was described as a separate subspecies living in Japan, but later analysis found it to the same as rufescens.
- Odonestis pruni oberthueri live in mountainous regions of Tibet, the Eastern Himalayas, and southern China. It is the largest of the species, and daker that the pruni variety.

== Interaction with humans ==
=== Pest of crop plants ===
It used to be considered a pest insect, with the larvae living and eating from a variety of stone fruit and alder trees. In particular, this species is known to cause damage to the leaves of plum, damson, and cherry trees. In Japan and China, the caterpillar is also known to eat apple and pear trees.

== Gallery ==
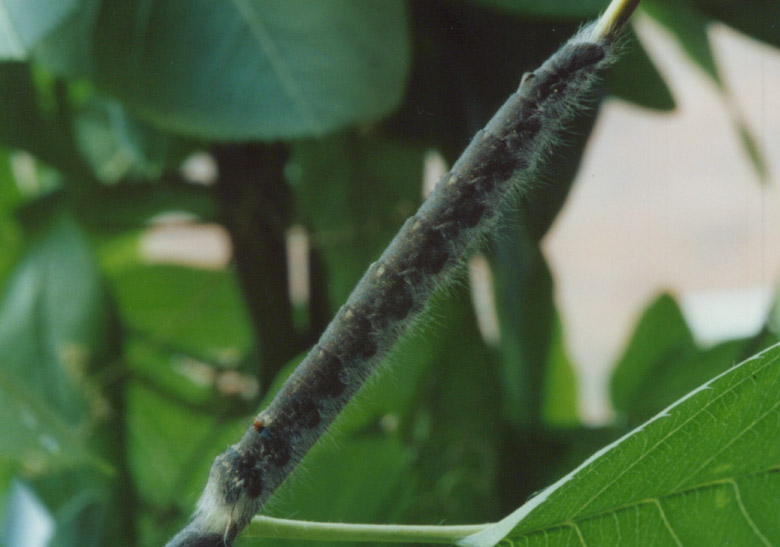
An example of the odonestis pruni caterpillar.

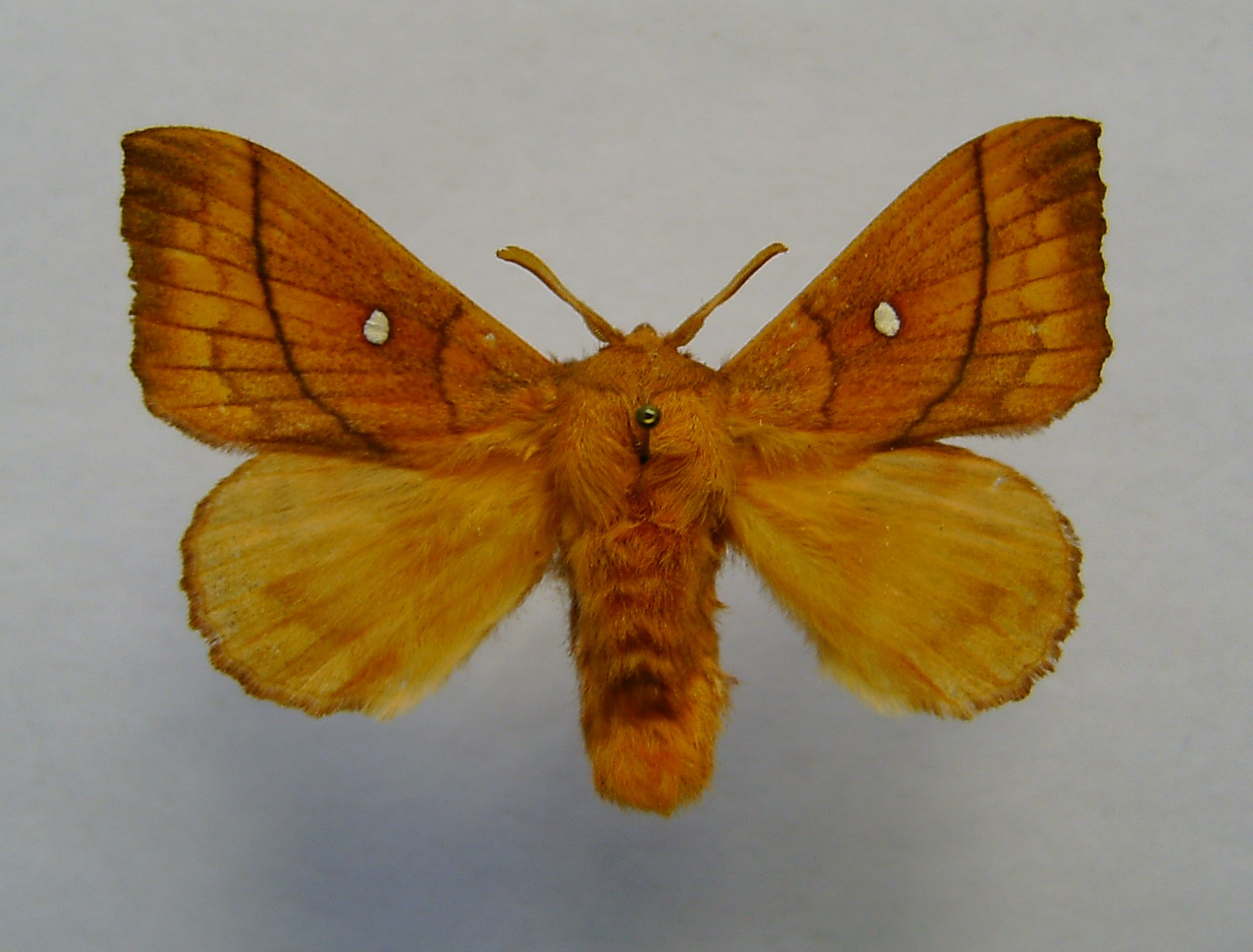
An adult odonestis pruni with wings fully displayed.
