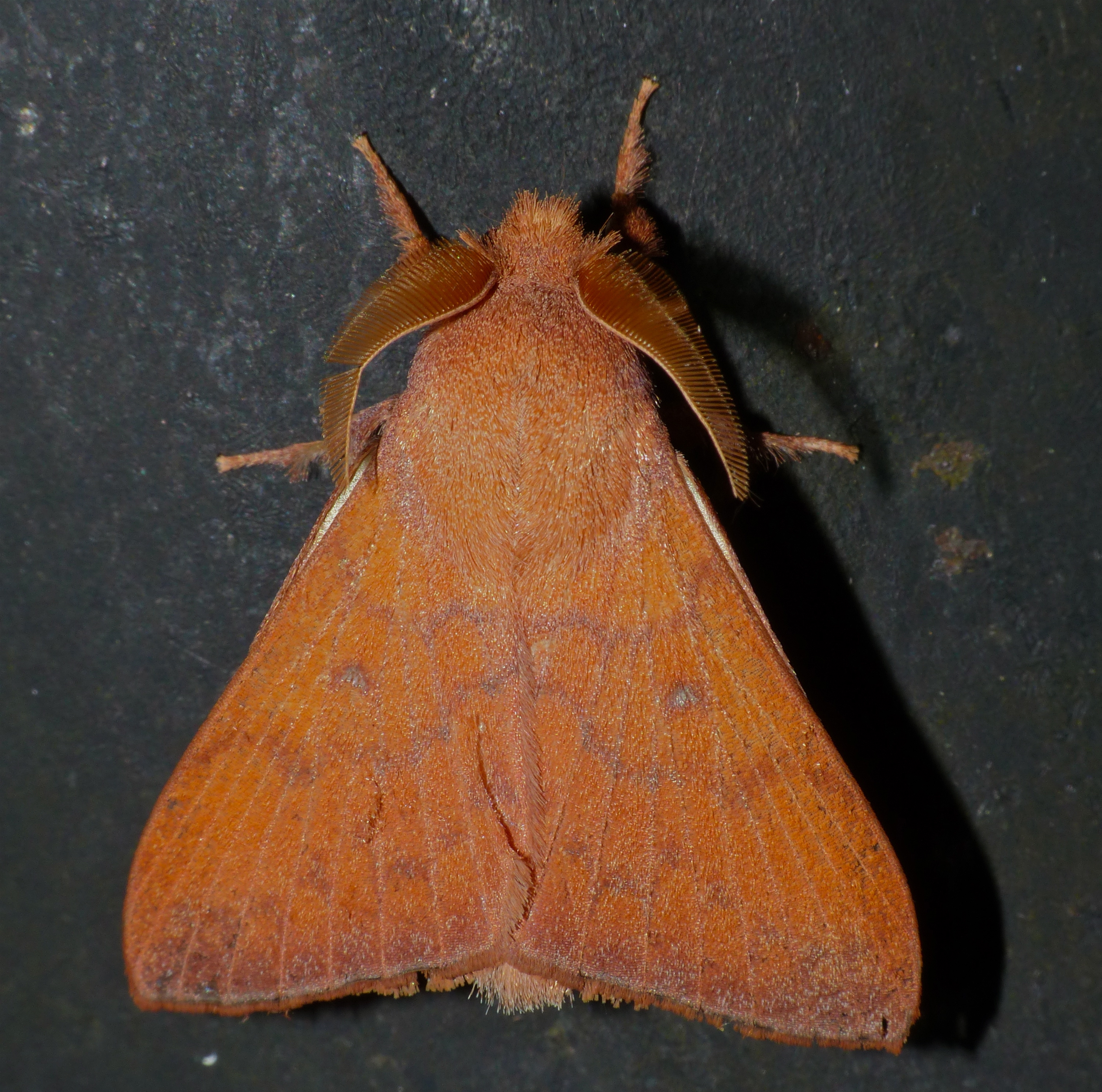

Scientific classification
- Domain: Eukaryota
- Kingdom: Animalia
- Phylum: Arthropoda
- Class: Insecta
- Order: Lepidoptera
- Family: Lasiocampidae
- Genus: Odonestis
- Species: O. vita

Binomial name
- Odonestis vita Moore, 1859

Synonyms
- Odonestis vita Moore, in Horsfield & Moore, 1859; Odonestis vita Moore; Tams, 1935

= Odonestis vita =

Species of moth

Odonestis vita is a moth of the family Lasiocampidae first described by Frederic Moore in 1859. Three former subspecies are now recognized as separate species.

== Distribution ==
It is found from the Indian subregion to Sundaland, Thailand, Thailand, China, Vietnam, Borneo, Sumatra, Java and the Philippines.

== Description ==
The body is orange red. The forewings are short and more compact with irregular postmedial lines. The white discal spot and the fasciae are indistinct. Caterpillars are recorded from plants like Eugenia, Psidium and Lagerstroemia species.

== Current subspecies ==
In earlier classifications recorded six subspecies including the nominate race. However, recently O. v. belli, O. v. ceylonica and O. v. leopoldi were elevated to species level.

Subspecies	Distribution	Wingspan	Larval food plants
Odonestis vita brachyschalida Tams, 1935	Philippines: Mindanao	42 mm in male and 46 mm in female	
Odonestis vita indica Tams, 1935	North-eastern India. Recorded only by a damaged specimen.		
Odonestis vita vita Moore, 1859	Southern China (Guangdong, Guangxi, Hainan), Thailand, Vietnam, Borneo, Sumatra, Java	Smallest. 32–38 mm in male and 52 mm in female	Lagerstroemia, Eugenia, Psidium, Syzygium jambos, Lagerstroemia speciosa, L. macrocarpa and Psidium guajava

== Former subspecies ==
Subspecies	Distribution	Wingspan	Larval food plants
Odonestis vita belli Tams, 1935	Coast of south-western India	45 mm in male, very similar to O. ceylonica	
Odonestis vita ceylonica Tams, 1935	Sri Lanka, southern India	36–43 mm in male and 56–58 mm in female	
Odonestis vita leopoldi Tams, 1935	Philippines: Luzon, Leyte	36–38 mm in male and 52 mm in female	
