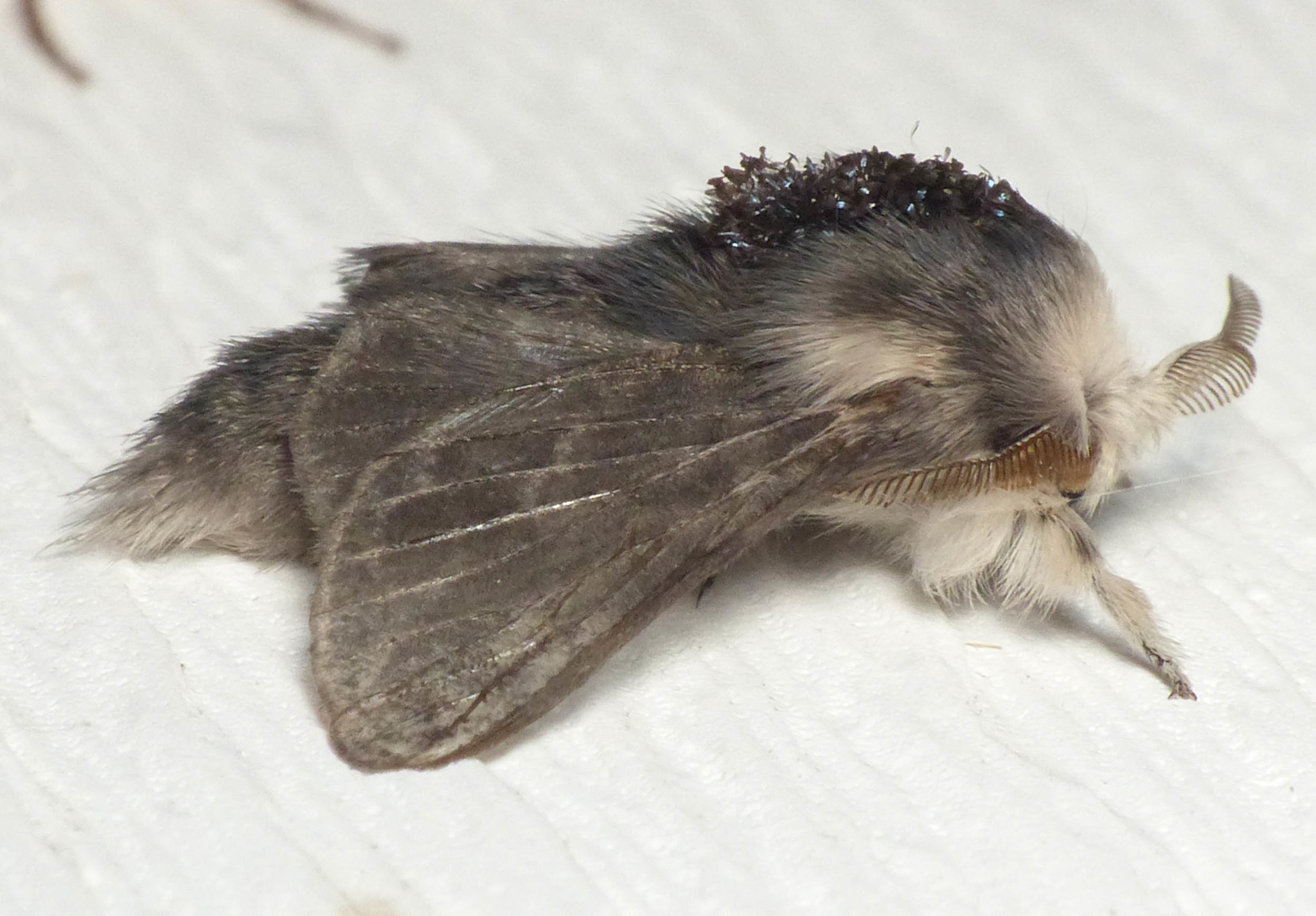
- Tolype laricis, larch tolype

Scientific classification
- Kingdom: Animalia
- Phylum: Arthropoda
- Class: Insecta
- Order: Lepidoptera
- Family: Lasiocampidae
- Tribe: Macromphaliini
- Genus: Tolype
- Species: T. laricis

Binomial name
- Tolype laricis (Fitch, 1856)

= Tolype laricis =

Species of moth

Tolype laricis, known generally as the larch tolype or larch lappet moth, is a species in the moth family Lasiocampidae found in eastern North America.

The MONA or Hodges number for Tolype laricis is 7673.
