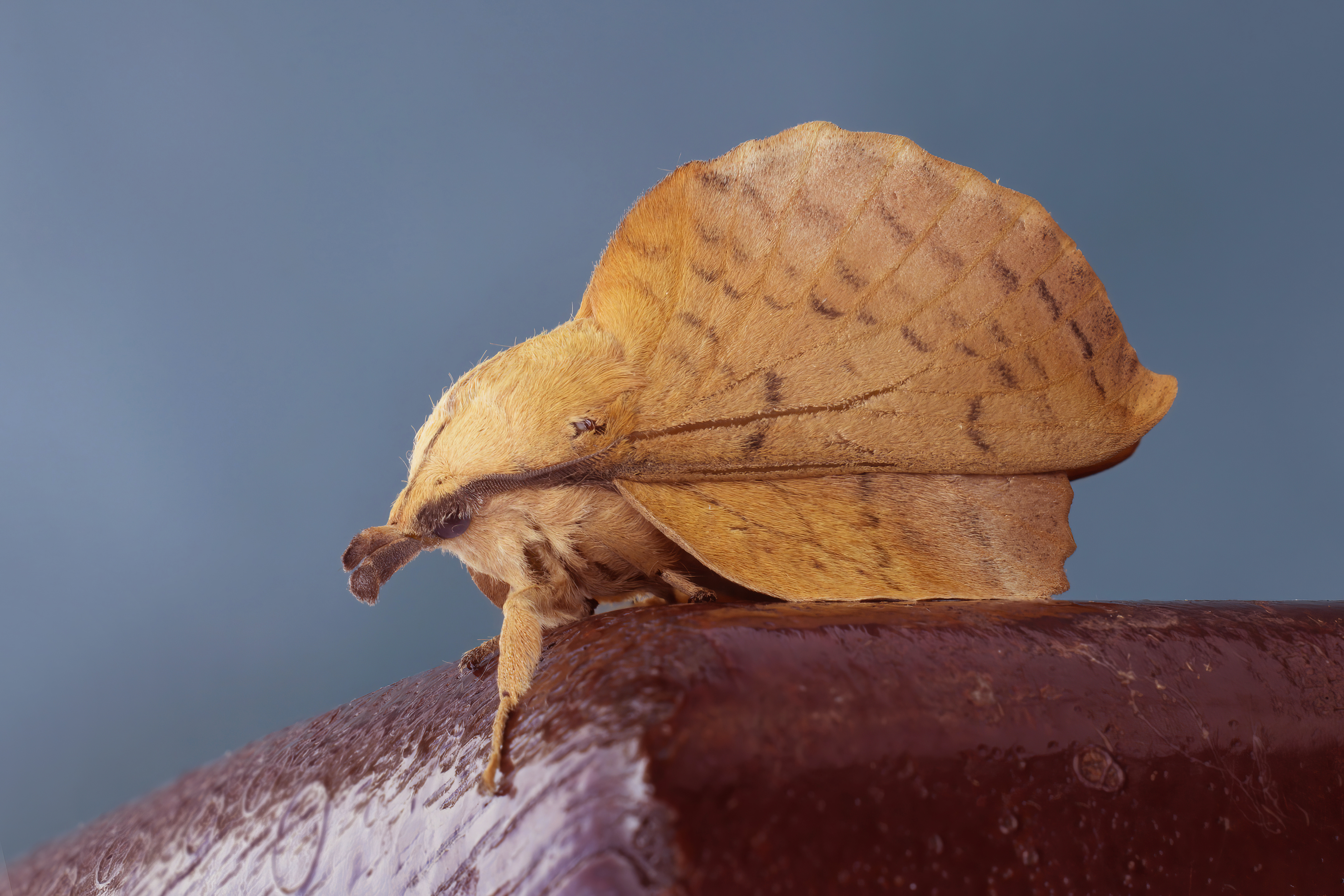
- Gastropacha populifolia

Scientific classification
- Domain: Eukaryota
- Kingdom: Animalia
- Phylum: Arthropoda
- Class: Insecta
- Order: Lepidoptera
- Family: Lasiocampidae
- Genus: Gastropacha; Ochsenheimer, 1810

Synonyms
- Bombyx Boisduval, 1828; Phylloma Billberg, 1820; Stenophylloides Hampson, [1893] 1892

= Gastropacha =

Genus of moths

Gastropacha is a genus of moths in the family Lasiocampidae. It was first described by Ochsenheimer in 1810.

== Species ==
- Gastropacha acutifolia Roepke, 1953
- Gastropacha caesarea Zolotuhin & Witt, 2005
- Gastropacha clathrata Bryk, 1948
- Gastropacha deruna Moore, 1859
- Gastropacha eberti de Lajonquière, 1967
- Gastropacha hauensteini Zolotuhin, 2005
- Gastropacha hoenei De Lajonquière, 1976
- Gastropacha horishana Matsumura, 1927
  - Gastropacha horishana egregia Zolotuhin, 2005
- Gastropacha insularis Zolotuhin, 2005
- Gastropacha moorei Zolotuhin, 2005
- Gastropacha pardale (Walker, 1855)
  - Gastropacha pardale sinensis Tams, 1935
- Gastropacha pelengata Zolotuhin & J.D. Holloway, 2006
- Gastropacha philippinensis Tams, 1935
  - Gastropacha philippinensis swanni Tams, 1935
- Gastropacha populifolia (Esper, 1784)
  - Gastropacha populifolia angustipennis (Walker, 1855)
  - Gastropacha populifolia mephisto Zolotuhin, 2005
- Gastropacha prionophora Tams, 1935
- Gastropacha quercifolia (Linnaeus, 1758)
  - Gastropacha quercifolia mekongensis De Lajonquière, 1976
  - Gastropacha quercifolia thibetana De Lajonquière, 1976
- Gastropacha remnaumovi Zolotuhin, 2005
- Gastropacha sikkima Moore, 1879
- Gastropacha watanabei Okano, 1966
- Gastropacha xenapates Tams, 1935
