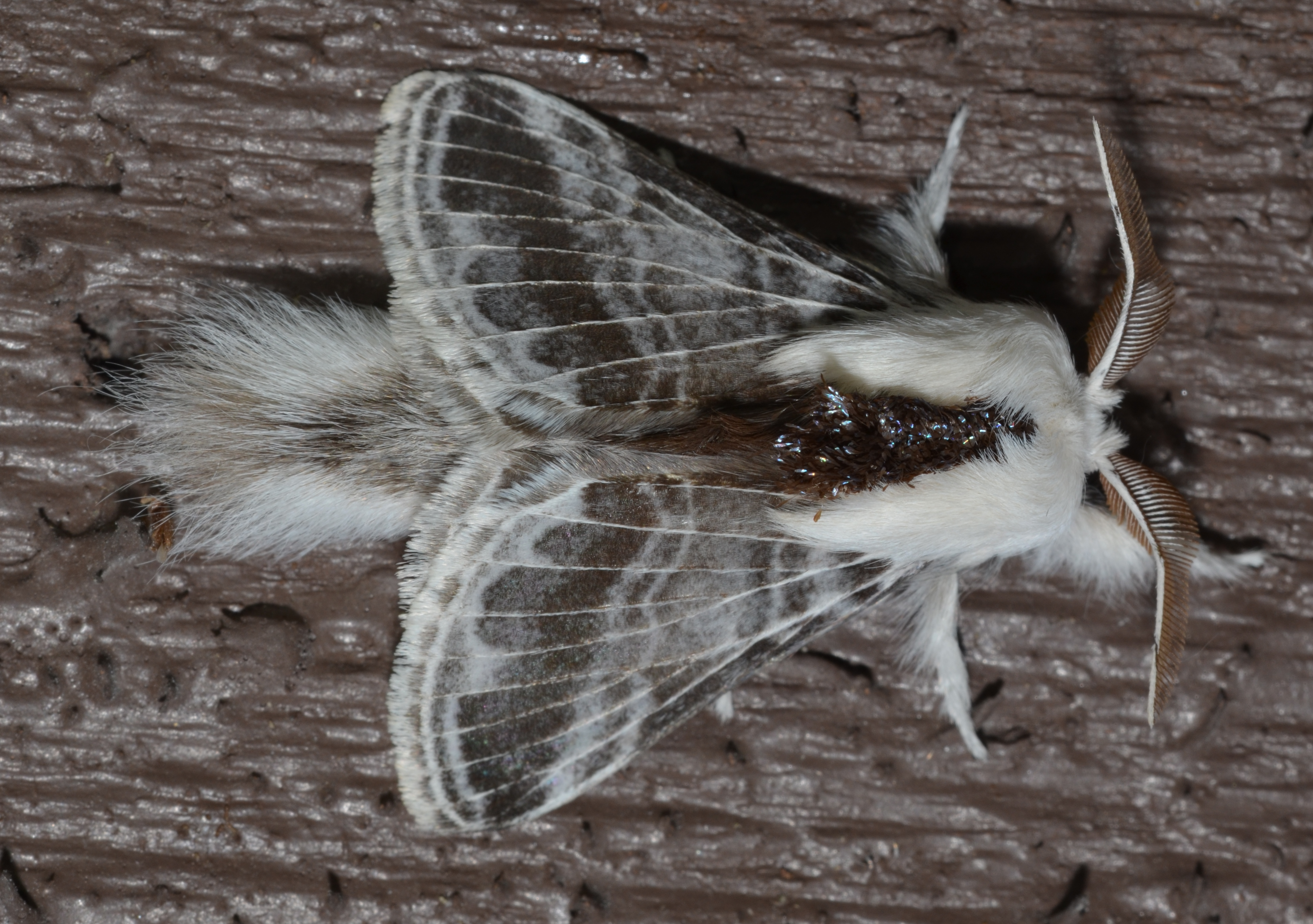
- Adult male

Scientific classification
- Kingdom: Animalia
- Phylum: Arthropoda
- Clade: Pancrustacea
- Class: Insecta
- Order: Lepidoptera
- Family: Lasiocampidae
- Genus: Tolype
- Species: T. velleda

Binomial name
- Tolype velleda (Stoll, 1791)

Synonyms
- Phalaena Bombyx velleda Stoll, [1790]; Tolype candidatus Cassino, 1928

= Tolype velleda =

Species of moth

Tolype velleda, the large tolype moth or velleda lappet moth, is a species of moth of the family Lasiocampidae. It was first described by Caspar Stoll in 1791. The species is found from Nova Scotia to central Florida, west to Texas and north to Ontario. Out of the United States, they can also be found in low and littoral areas of the Iberian Peninsula and North Africa from Egypt to the Atlantic coast of Morocco.

The wingspan is 32–58 mm. The females are larger than the males. When the wings are opened, they appear to be dark gray with wavy bands running across. When the wings are closed, the white lines become less visible, but the pattern is still there and remains the same. Adults are on wing from June to November in one generation per year.

The larvae feed on various broadleaf trees and shrubs, including Malus, Fraxinus, Populus, Tilia, Fagus, Betula, Prunus, and Quercus species. The larvae can be identified by its dull gray color, and a flap that is present on its pro legs that disappears as it matures. Larvae can be found from June to August.

Common host plants of the Tolype Velleda are apple, plum, cherry, apricot, almond, birch, poplar, oak, beech, and citrus trees. Eggs are placed on leaves of host plants. Feeding is most active in summer months.
