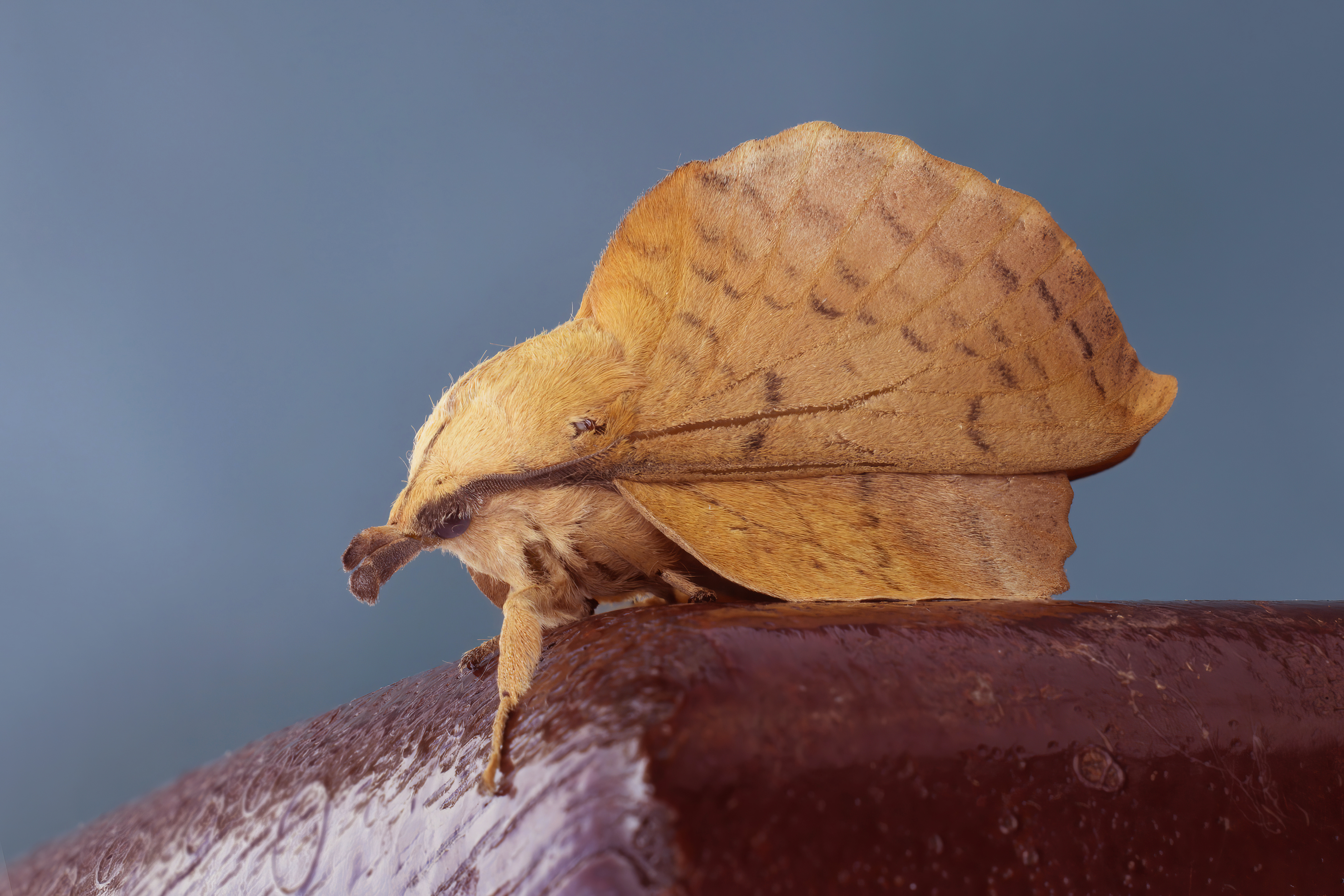

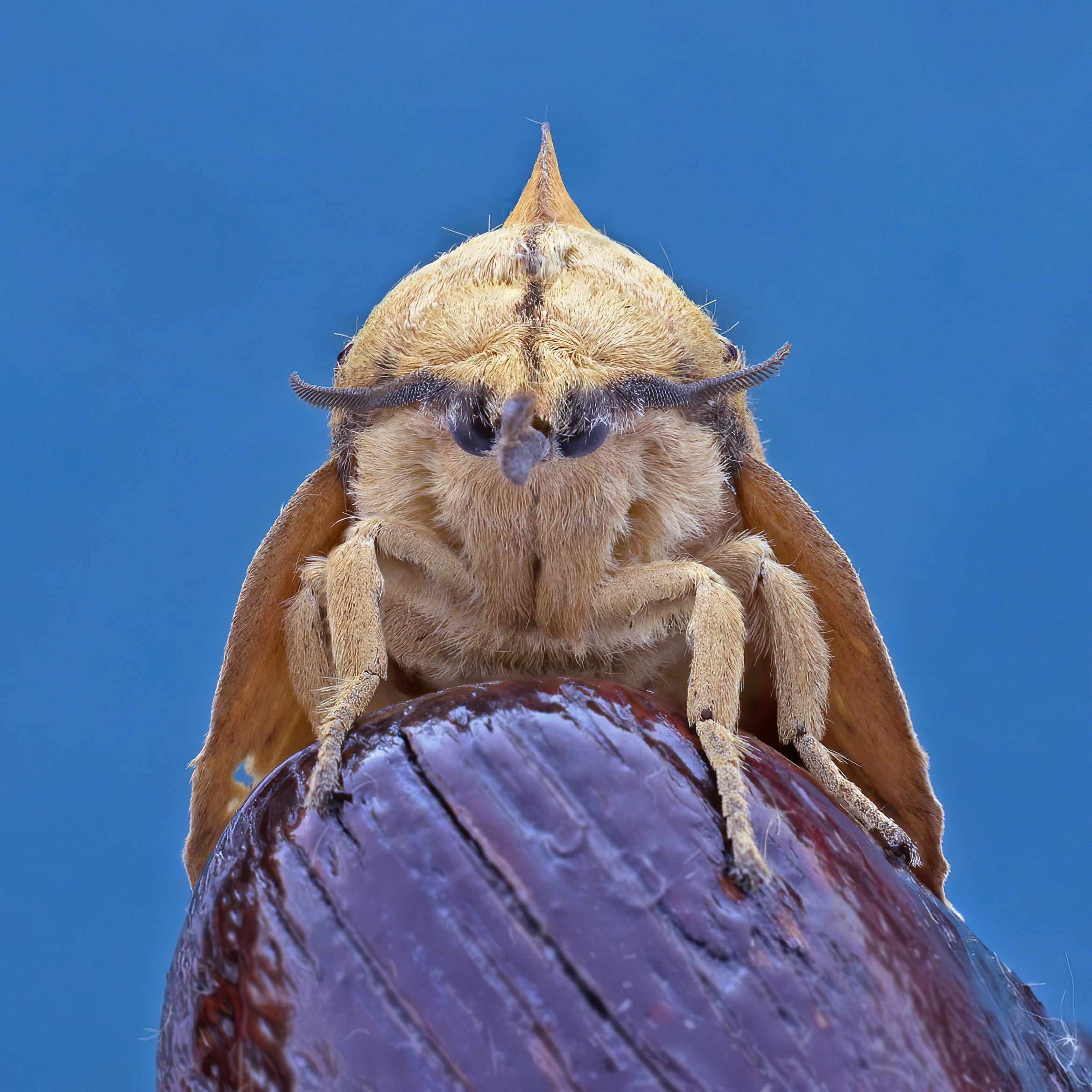
- Danube delta, Romania

Scientific classification
- Domain: Eukaryota
- Kingdom: Animalia
- Phylum: Arthropoda
- Class: Insecta
- Order: Lepidoptera
- Family: Lasiocampidae
- Genus: Gastropacha
- Species: G. populifolia

Binomial name
- Gastropacha populifolia (Esper, 1784)

Synonyms
- Bombyx populifolia Esper, 1784; Gastropacha angustipennis Walker, 1855; Gastropacha tsingtauica Grünberg, 1911; Gastropacha populifolia f. japonica Matsumura, 1932; Gastropacha populifolia f. fumosa de Lajonquière, 1976

= Gastropacha populifolia =

Species of moth

Gastropacha populifolia, the poplar lappet, is a moth of the family Lasiocampidae. It is found in Southern and Central Europe, through Russia, India and China up to Japan.

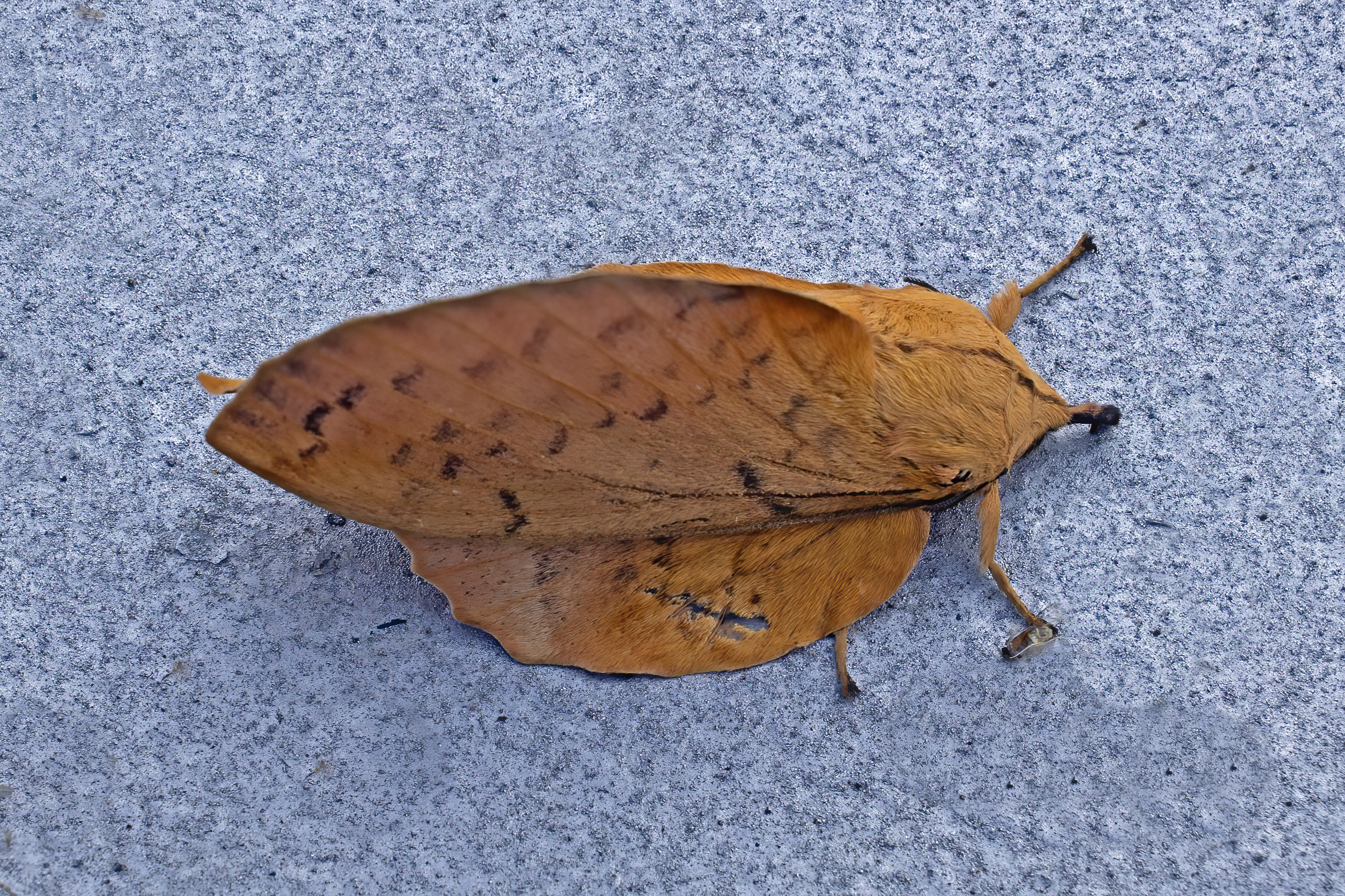
dorsal view

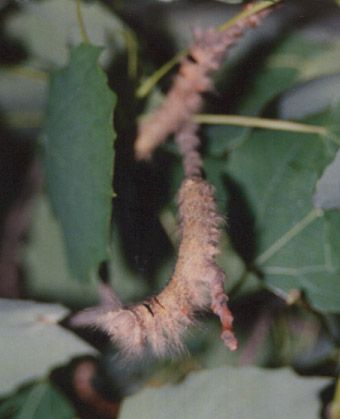
Caterpillar

The wingspan is 45–65 mm for males and 65–80 mm for females. The moth flies from June to August depending on the location.

The larvae feed on Populus and willow species.

== Subspecies ==
- Gastropacha populifolia populifolia
- Gastropacha populifolia angustipennis (Walker, 1855)
- Gastropacha populifolia mephisto Zolotuhin, 2005
