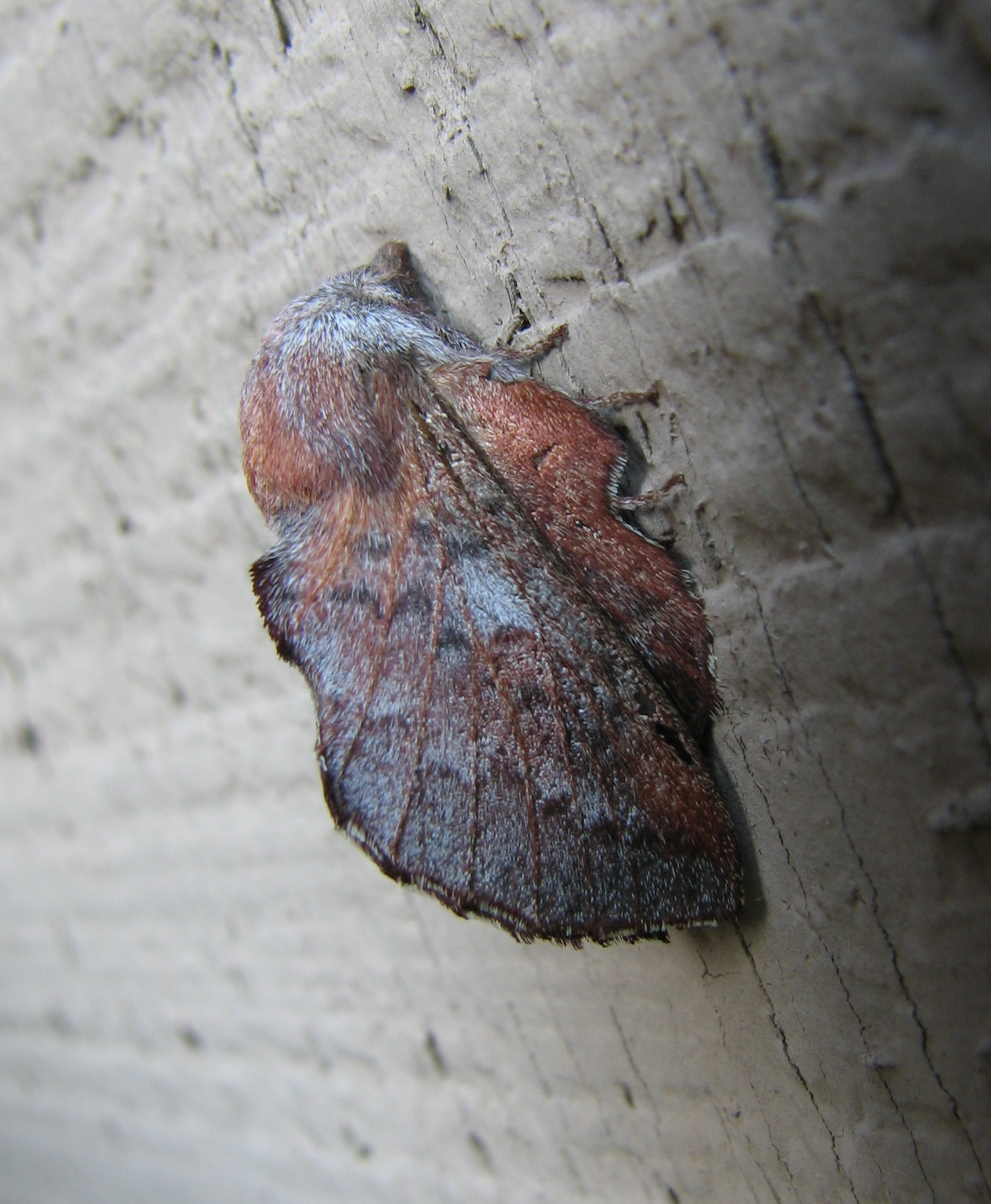

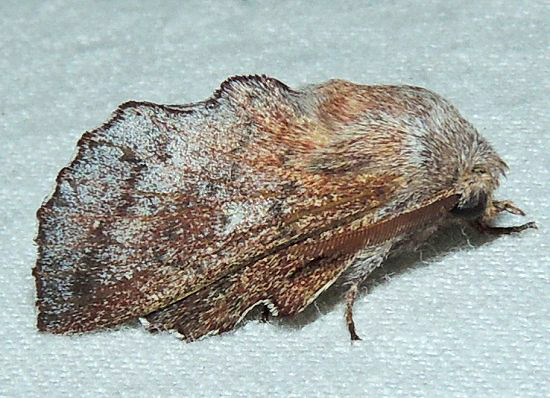

Scientific classification
- Kingdom: Animalia
- Phylum: Arthropoda
- Class: Insecta
- Order: Lepidoptera
- Family: Lasiocampidae
- Genus: Phyllodesma
- Species: P. americana

Binomial name
- Phyllodesma americana (Harris, 1841)

Synonyms
- Phyllodesma americana ssp. canadensis Lajonquiére, [1969]; Gastropacha ferruginea Packard, [1865]; Phyllodesma americana f. clarinervata Lajonquiére, [1969]; ?Phyllodesma americana ssp. santilaurensis Lajonquiére, [1969]; Gastropacha californica Packard, 1872; Gastropacha mildei Stretch, 1872; Gastropacha roseata Stretch, 1872; Phyllodesma dyari Rivers, 1893

= Phyllodesma americana =

American lappet moth

Species of moth

Phyllodesma americana, the American lappet moth, is a moth of the family Lasiocampidae. It is found from Nova Scotia to northern Florida, west through Texas to California, north to British Columbia and Yukon.

The wingspan is 29–49 mm. Adults are on wing from March to September in two generations in the south. In eastern Ontario, adults are on wing from May to July. The flight season in Ohio is from April to August. There is one generation per year in the northern part of the range.

The larvae feed on the leaves of Alnus, Betula, Quercus, Populus, Salix, Ceanothus velutinus, Chrysolepis chrysophylla and Rosoideae species.

== Subspecies ==
- Phyllodesma americana rockiesensis
- Phyllodesma americana borealis
- Phyllodesma americana alascensis
- Phyllodesma americana californica
- Phyllodesma americana dyari
- Phyllodesma americana celsivolans
