= Phyllodesma =

Scientific classification
- Kingdom: Animalia
- Phylum: Arthropoda
- Clade: Pancrustacea
- Class: Insecta
- Order: Lepidoptera
- Family: Lasiocampidae
- Subfamily: Lasiocampinae
- Tribe: Gastropachini
- Genus: Phyllodesma; Hübner, 1820

Synonyms
- Epicnaptera Rambur, [1866]; Ammatocampa Wallengren, 1869

Genus of moths

Phyllodesma is a Holarctic genus of moths in the family Lasiocampidae. The genus was first described by Jacob Hübner in 1820.

== Species ==
- Phyllodesma ilicifolia
- Phyllodesma japonicum
- Phyllodesma tremulifolium
- Phyllodesma kermesifolium
- Phyllodesma suberifolium
- Phyllodesma priapus
- Phyllodesma ambigua
- Phyllodesma alice
- Phyllodesma hyssarum
- Phyllodesma joannisi
- Phyllodesma jurii
- Phyllodesma mongolicum
- Phyllodesma griseum
- Phyllodesma sinina
- Phyllodesma occidentis
- Phyllodesma americana
- Phyllodesma coturnix
