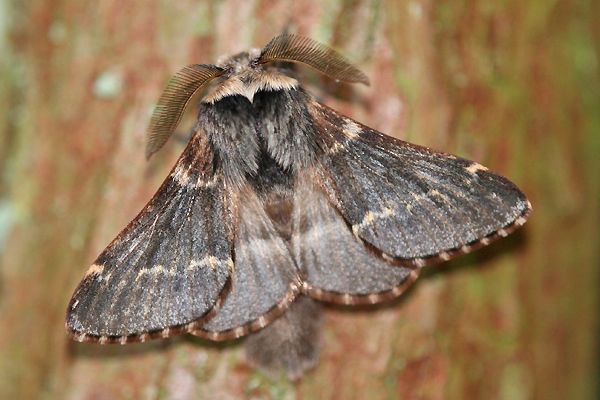
- Poecilocampa populi

Scientific classification
- Domain: Eukaryota
- Kingdom: Animalia
- Phylum: Arthropoda
- Class: Insecta
- Order: Lepidoptera
- Family: Lasiocampidae
- Genus: Poecilocampa; Stephens, 1828

= Poecilocampa =

Genus of moths

Poecilocampa is a genus of moths in the family Lasiocampidae first described by Stephens in 1828.

== Species ==
- Poecilocampa alpina (Frey & Wullschlevel, 1874) - Millière's December moth
- Poecilocampa nilsinjaevi Siniaev & Plutenko 2005
- Poecilocampa populi (Linnaeus, 1758) - December eggar
- Poecilocampa tamanukii (Matsumura, 1928)
