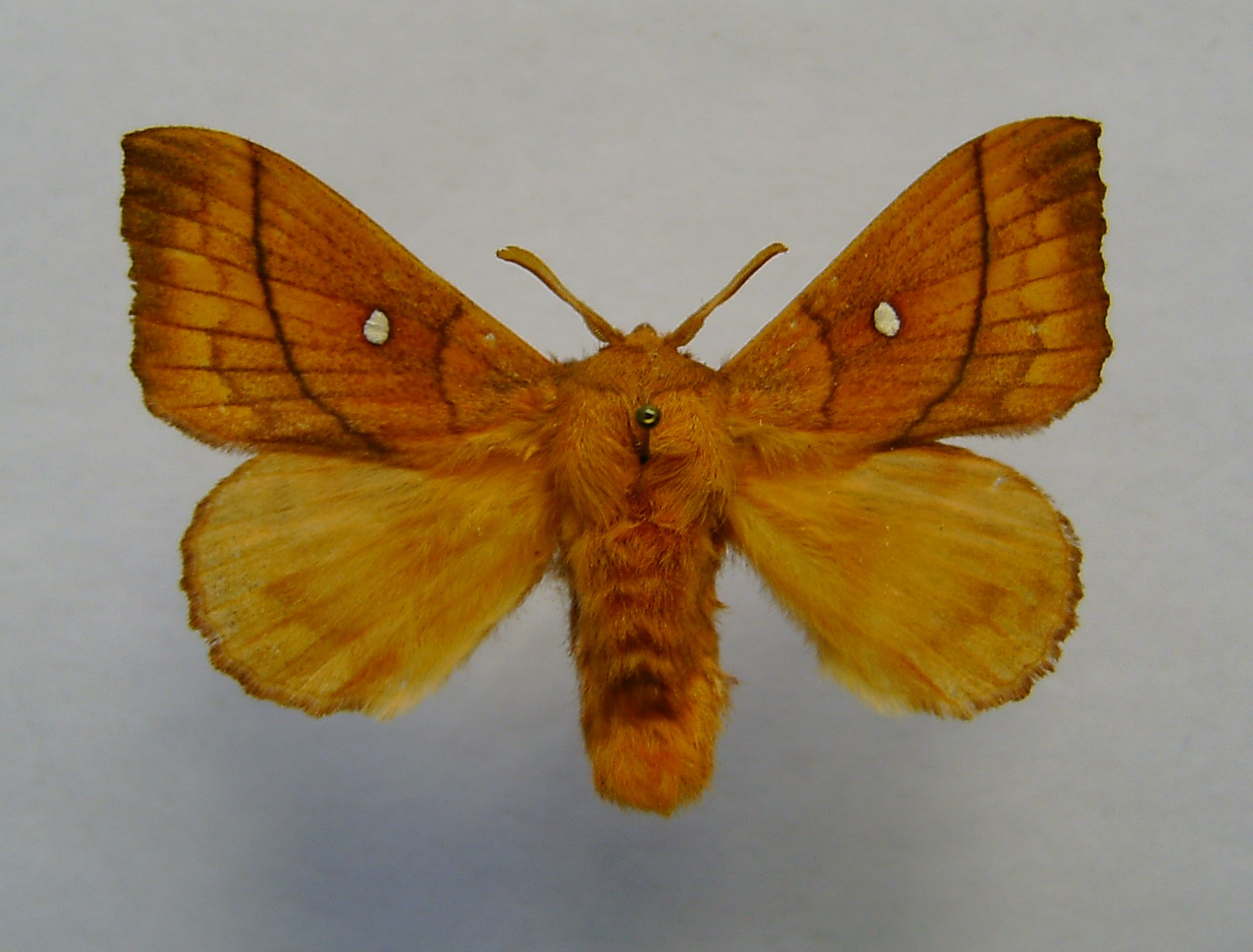
- Mounted adult
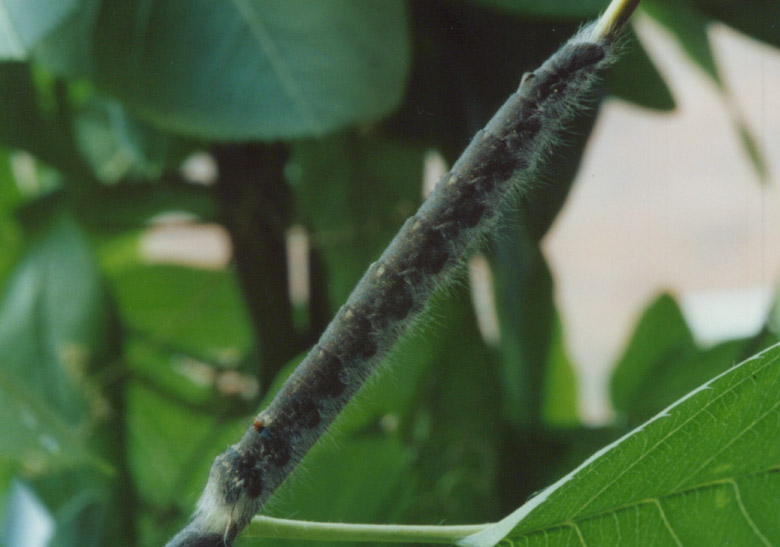
- Caterpillar

Scientific classification
- Kingdom: Animalia
- Phylum: Arthropoda
- Class: Insecta
- Order: Lepidoptera
- Family: Lasiocampidae
- Subfamily: Lasiocampinae
- Tribe: Odonestini
- Genus: Odonestis; Germar, 1812

Species
- 22 species

Synonyms
- Pseudarguda Matsumara 1932

= Odonestis =

Genus of moths

Odonestis is a genus of moths in the family Lasiocampidae described by Ernst Friedrich Germar in 1812. It consists of twenty-two species, which are found in Europe, Russia, Asia Minor, China and Japan.

== Description ==
The wingspan is 30–50 mm (1.2–2.0 in) for males and 50–60 mm (2.0–2.4 in) for females. The moths fly from May to June and again from August to September depending on the location. Palpi very long and slender. Antennae with shorter branches in female than male. Legs with very minute spurs. Forewings are long with acute apex. Outer margin obliquely rounded. Veins 6 and 7 stalked. Stalk of veins 9 and 10 short. Hindwing with veins 4 and 5 from cell or stalked. Vein 8 curved, and met by a bar from vein 7. The accessory costal veinlets are numerous and prominent.

== Ecology ==
The larvae feed on Prunus, Pirus, Quercus, Tilia, Betula, Alnus, Ulmus, Crataegus, Salix and Rhamnus species.

== Species ==
- Odonestis angulata (Grünberg, 1913)
- Odonestis apo Zolotuhin et al., 1997
- Odonestis belli (Tams, 1935)
- Odonestis bheroba Moore, 1858/59
- Odonestis ceylonica (Tams, 1935)
- Odonestis divisa Moore, 1879
- Odonestis erectilinea (Swinhoe, 1904)
- Odonestis filigranica Sergeev & Zolotuhin, 2010
- Odonestis formosae Wileman, 1910
- Odonestis germari Sergeev & Zolotuhin, 2010
- Odonestis gisla Zolotuhin & Holloway, 2006
- Odonestis leopoldi Tams, 1935
- Odonestis lipara Tams, 1935
- Odonestis kama Zolotuhin & Holloway, 2006
- Odonestis maya Zolotuhin & Holloway, 2006
- Odonestis ophioglossa Tams, 1935
- Odonestis pinratanai Zolotuhin, 2005
- Odonestis pruni (Linnaeus, 1758)
- Odonestis schalicteta Tams, 1935
- Odonestis vinacea Holloway & Bender, 1990
- Odonestis vita Moore, 1859
