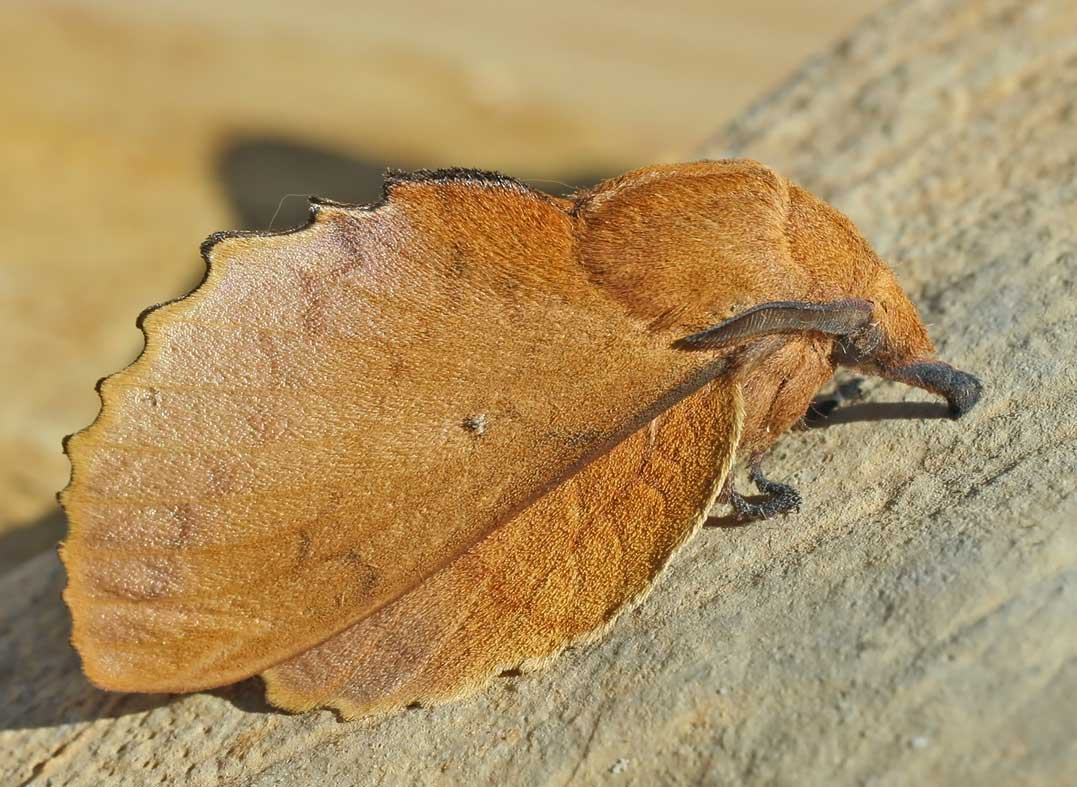

Scientific classification
- Kingdom: Animalia
- Phylum: Arthropoda
- Class: Insecta
- Order: Lepidoptera
- Family: Lasiocampidae
- Genus: Gastropacha
- Species: G. quercifolia

Binomial name
- Gastropacha quercifolia (Linnaeus, 1758)

Synonyms
- Phalaena quercifolia Linnaeus, 1758

= Gastropacha quercifolia =

Lappet

Species of moth

Gastropacha quercifolia, the lappet, is a moth of the family Lasiocampidae. It is found in Europe and east across the Palearctic to Japan.

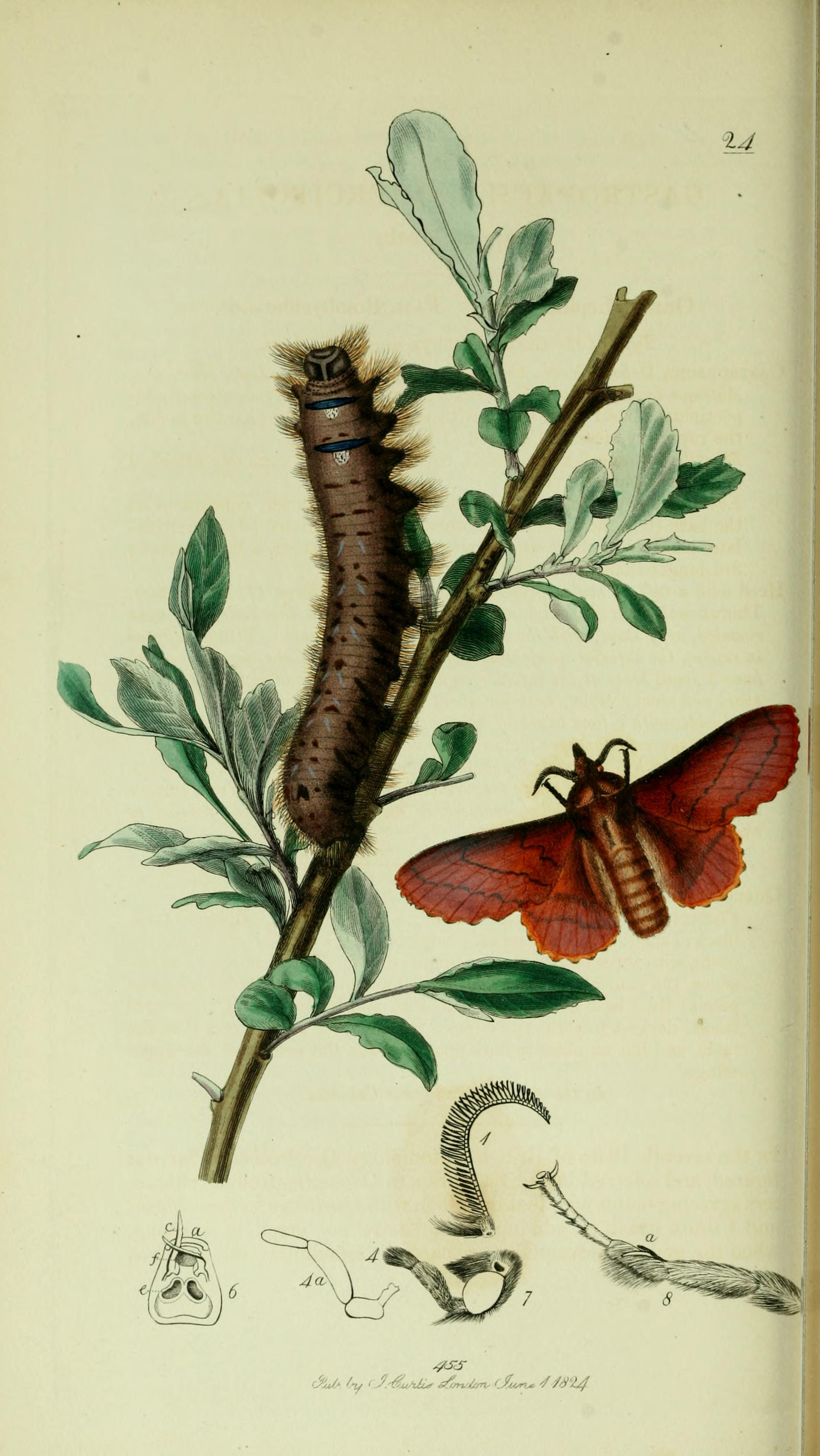
Illustration from John Curtis's British Entomology Volume 5

The wingspan is 50–90 mm. Meyrick describes it thus - forewings with 9 to termen; red-brown, with purple-bluish gloss, towards costa blackish-mixed, dorsally ferruginous; first, second, and praesubterminal lines blackish-grey, waved, bent near costa; a blackish-grey discal mark; termen waved-dentate. Hindwings as forewings, but lines indistinct, straight, costal area ferruginous, with about six blackish pseudoneuria; 8 connected with cell by long bar. Larva dark grey or brown; whitish dorsal marks on 3 and 4; 2nd and 3rd incisions deep indigo-blue; a prominence on 1 2; a subspiracular series of tubercles and fringe of pale hairs.

The larvae feed on Crataegus, Prunus spinosa, willow and oak.

== Subspecies ==
- Gastropacha quercifolia quercifolia (Linnaeus, 1758)
- Gastropacha quercifolia mekongensis de Lajonquière, 1976
- Gastropacha quercifolia thibetana de Lajonquière, 1976
