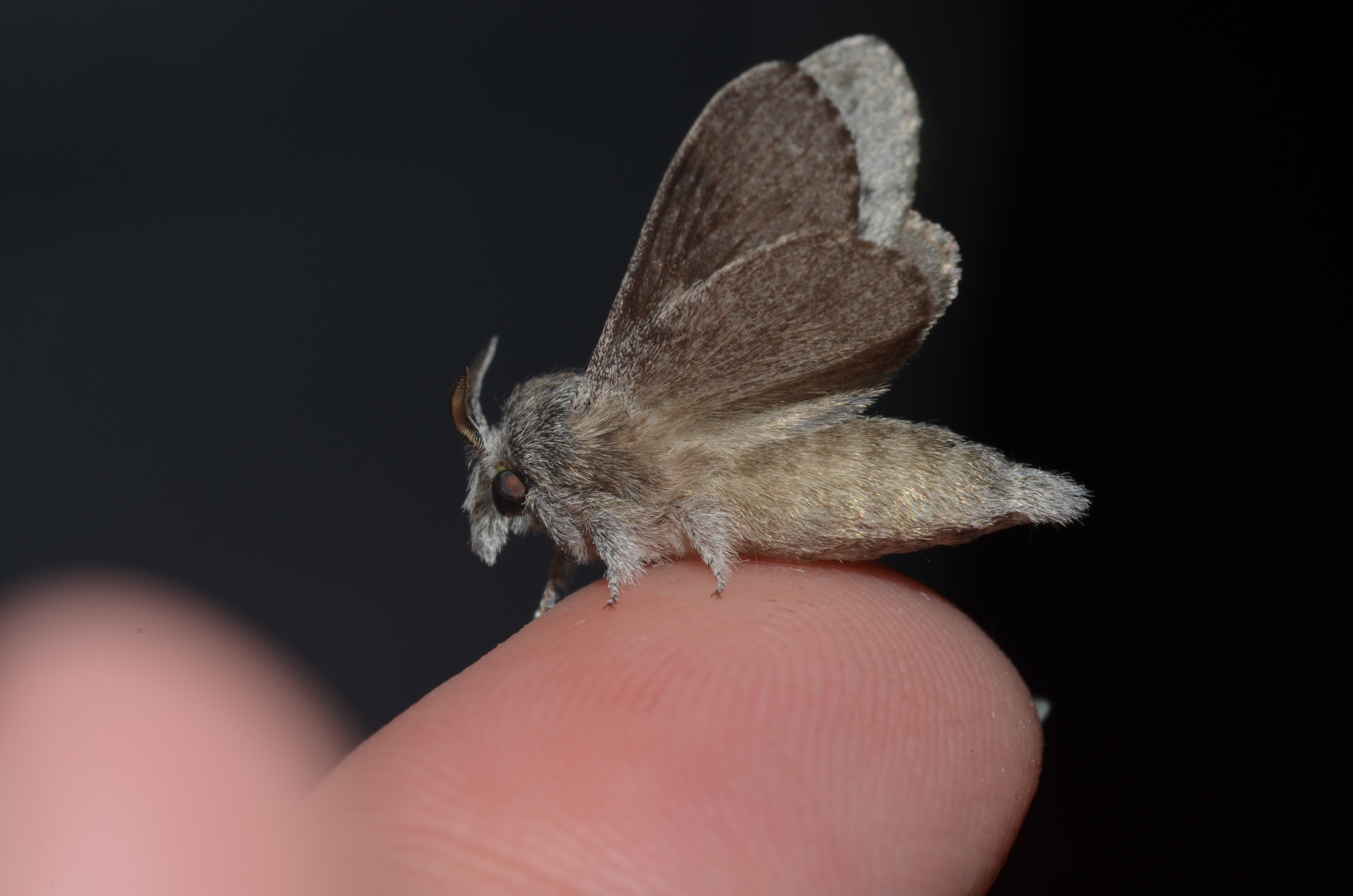

Scientific classification
- Kingdom: Animalia
- Phylum: Arthropoda
- Class: Insecta
- Order: Lepidoptera
- Family: Lasiocampidae
- Genus: Heteropacha; Harvey, 1874
- Species: H. rileyana

Binomial name
- Heteropacha rileyana Harvey, 1874

= Heteropacha =

Moth genus

Heteropacha is a monotypic moth genus in the family Lasiocampidae described by Leon F. Harvey in 1874. Its only species, Heteropacha rileyana, or Riley's lappet moth, was described by the same author in the same year. It can be found in the US states of Mississippi, Missouri, Texas and Georgia.

The wingspan is 27–36 mm. The moths are on wing from late April to August.

The larvae feed on Gleditsia triacanthos.
