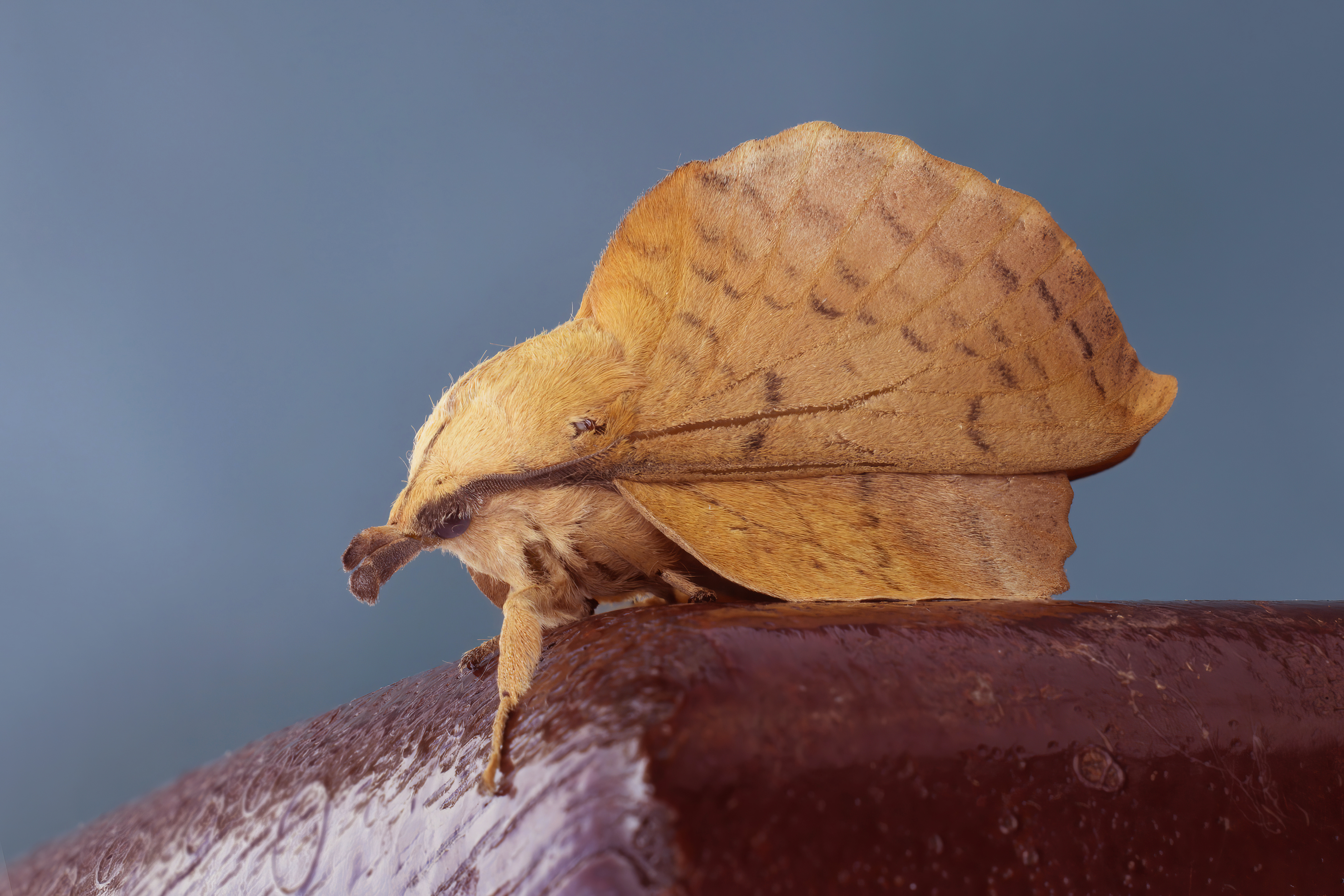
- Gastropacha populifolia

Scientific classification
- Kingdom: Animalia
- Phylum: Arthropoda
- Clade: Pancrustacea
- Class: Insecta
- Order: Lepidoptera
- Clade: Apoditrysia
- Clade: Obtectomera
- Clade: Macroheterocera
- Superfamily: Lasiocampoidea; Harris, 1841
- Family: Lasiocampidae; Harris, 1841

Subfamilies
- Chionopsychinae; Chondrosteginae; Lasiocampinae; Macromphaliinae; Poecilocampinae

Diversity
- About 224 genera and 1,952 species (van Nieukerken, et al., 2011)

Synonyms
- Lasiocampadae Harris, 1841 [sic]; Lasiocampidae Duponchel, 1844 (emend.)

= Lasiocampidae =

Family of moths

The Lasiocampidae are a family of moths also known as eggars, tent caterpillars, snout moths (although this also refers to the Pyralidae), or lappet moths. Over 2,000 species occur worldwide, and probably not all have been named or studied. It is the sole family in superfamily Lasiocampoidea.

== Etymology ==
Their common name "snout moths" comes from the unique protruding mouth parts of some species which resemble a large nose. They are called "lappet moths" due to the decorative skin flaps found on the caterpillar's prolegs. The name "eggars" comes from the neat egg-shaped cocoons of some species. The scientific name is from the Greek lasio (wooly) and campa (caterpillar).

== Description ==
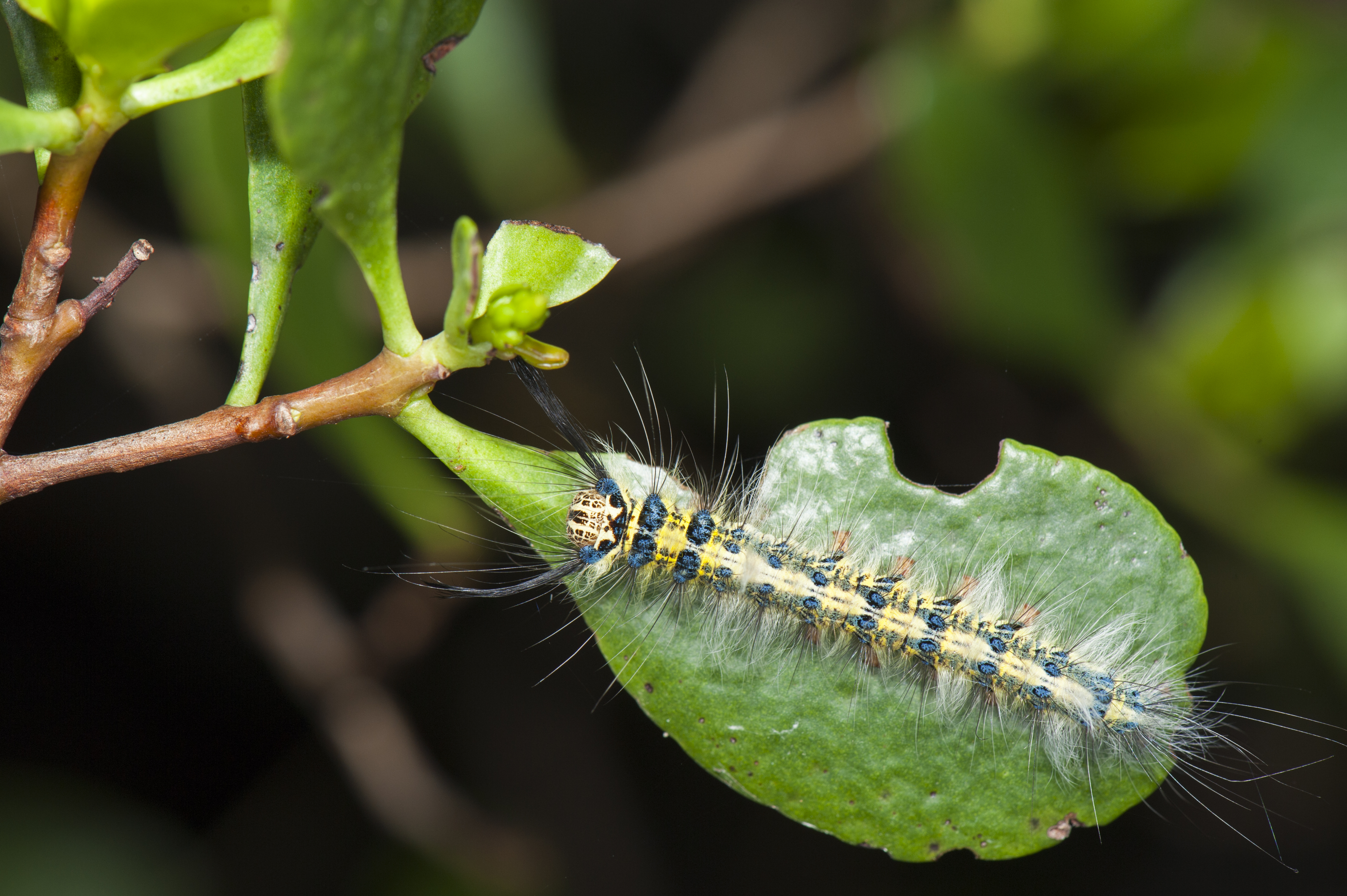
Trabala vishnou larva

Caterpillars of this family are large and are most often hairy, especially on their sides. Most have skin flaps on their prolegs and a pair of dorsal glands on their abdomens. They feed on leaves of many different trees and shrubs, and often use these same plants to camouflage their cocoons. Some species are called tent caterpillars due to their habit of living together in nests spun of silk.

As adults, the moths in this family are large bodied with broad wings and may still have the characteristic elongated mouth parts, or have reduced mouthparts and not feed as adults. They are either diurnal or nocturnal. Females lay a large number of eggs which are flat in appearance and either smooth or slightly pitted. In tent caterpillars, the eggs are deposited in masses and covered with a material that hardens in air. Females are generally larger and slower than the males, but the sexes otherwise resemble each other. Moths are typically brown or grey, with hairy legs and bodies.

A family of moths mostly of large size. Palpi porrect and generally large; proboscis absent; eyes small; antennae bipectinate in both sexes; legs generally with minute terminal pairs of spurs to mid and hind tibia and rather hairy. Fore wing with vein 1a not forked with b; 1c rarely present; the cell medial in position; veins 6 and 7 from the angle; veins 9 and 10 always stalked and from beyond the angle. Hind wing with two internal veins; 6 and 7 arising very near the base; 8 curved and almost touching 7 or connected with it by a bar, thus forming a precostal cell; accessory costal veinlets generally present. Frenulum absent. Larva with lateral downwardly-directed tufts of hair, and often subdorsal tufts or dorsal humps on anterior somites thickly clothed with hair. Cocoon closely woven of silk and hair.

— The Fauna of British India, Including Ceylon and Burma: Moths Volume I

== Subfamilies and tribes ==
Subfamily Chionopsychinae (1 genus, 2 species)

Subfamily Chondrosteginae (2 genera)

Subfamily Lasiocampinae (130 genera)

- Tribe Gastropachini (previously subfamily Gastropachinae)
- Tribe Lasiocampini
- Tribe Malacosomatini

Subfamily Macromphaliinae (15 genera)

Subfamily Poecilocampinae (about 20 genera)
e.g. Poecilocampa Stephens, 1828, Labedera Walker, 1855

Else, Other genera incertae sedis

- Bhima
- Borocera
- Nesara

== Selected North American species ==
- American lappet moth, Phyllodesma americana
- Riley's lappet moth, Heteropacha rileyana
- Eastern tent caterpillar, Malacosoma americanum
- Forest tent caterpillar, Malacosoma disstrium
- Western tent caterpillar, Malacosoma californicum
- Larch moth, Tolype laricis
- Velleda lappet moth, or large tolype Tolype velleda

== See also ==
- List of Lasiocampidae genera
