= List of moths of Australia (Lasiocampidae) =

Partial list of Australian moths

This is a list of the Australian moth species of the family Lasiocampidae. It also acts as an index to the species articles and forms part of the full List of moths of Australia.

== Gastropachinae ==
- Pernattia brevipennis (Walker, 1865)
- Pernattia chlorophragma (Turner, 1924)
- Pernattia pusilla (Donovan, 1805)

== Lasiocampinae ==
- Anastrolos apasta (Turner, 1924)
- Anastrolos holopolia (Turner, 1924)
- Anastrolos porphyrica (Turner, 1941)
- Anastrolos zoristis (Turner, 1924)
- Cyclophragma centralistrigata (Bethune-Baker, 1904)
- Cyclophragma cyclomela (Lower, 1903)
- Entometa apicalis (Walker, 1855)
- Entometa chlorosacca Turner, 1924
- Entometa decorata (Walker, 1865)
- Entometa erubescens (Lower, 1894)
- Entometa fervens (Walker, 1855)
- Entometa guerinii (Le Guillou, 1841)
- Entometa guttularis (Walker, 1855)
- Eremaea coralliphora (Lower, 1900)
- Eremaea zonospila (Lower, 1893)
- Genduara acedesta (Turner, 1911)
- Genduara albicans (Swinhoe, 1892)
- Genduara contermina (Walker, 1865)
- Genduara dianipha (Turner, 1911)
- Genduara fola (Swinhoe, 1902)
- Genduara macqueeni (Turner, 1936)
- Genduara macroptila (Turner, 1911)
- Genduara pinnalis (T.P. Lucas, 1895)
- Genduara punctigera (Walker, 1855)
- Genduara rhoda (Swinhoe, 1902)
- Genduara subnotata (Walker, 1869)
- Neurochyta agrapta (Turner, 1936)
- Neurochyta edna (Swinhoe, 1902)
- Opsirhina albigutta Walker, 1855
- Opsirhina alphaea (Fabricius, 1775)
- Opsirhina lechriodes (Turner, 1911)
- Pararguda albida (Walker, 1865)
- Pararguda australasiae (Fabricius, 1775)
- Pararguda crenulata (T.P. Lucas, 1894)
- Pararguda crocota (Turner, 1911)
- Pararguda dasymalla (Turner, 1924)
- Pararguda diamphidia (Turner, 1936)
- Pararguda ecnoma (Turner, 1924)
- Pararguda nana (Walker, 1855)
- Pararguda nasuta (Lewin, 1805)
- Pararguda nigriventris (Walker, 1862)
- Pararguda rufescens (Walker, 1855)
- Pararguda spodopa (Turner, 1904)
- Pararguda tephropsis (Turner, 1924)
- Pinara cana Walker, 1855
- Pinara divisa (Walker, 1855)
- Pinara metaphaea (Walker, 1862)
- Pinara obliqua (Walker, 1855)
- Pinara rufescens Butler, 1886
- Pinara sesioides (Walker, 1866)
- Porela albifinis (Walker, 1855)
- Porela amathodes Turner, 1924
- Porela ceraunias Turner, 1942
- Porela cinerea (Boisduval, 1832)
- Porela delineata (Walker, 1855)
- Porela euthyerges Turner, 1941
- Porela galactodes (Lower, 1893)
- Porela homospila Turner, 1924
- Porela notabilis (Walker, 1855)
- Porela notodontina (R. Felder, 1874)
- Porela obtusa (Walker, 1865)
- Porela rhabditis (Turner, 1932)
- Porela subfasciata (Walker, 1855)
- Porela vetusta Walker, 1855
- Porela vitulina (Donovan, 1805)
- Symphyta colpodes Turner, 1924
- Symphyta nephelodes (Turner, 1924)
- Symphyta nyctopis Turner, 1902
- Symphyta oxygramma (Lower, 1902)
- Symphyta psaropis Turner, 1902
