= M. antiqua =

M. antiqua may refer to one of the following species:

- Mecytha antiqua, a synonym for the Porela Vetusta, a moth species
- Megachile antiqua, a bee species
- Mordellistena antiqua, a beetle species
