= P. divisa =

P. divisa may refer to:

- Pinara divisa, the common pinara, a moth species found in the south-east quarter of Australia
- Platypleura divisa, a cicada species found in Africa

== See also ==
- Divisa (disambiguation)
