= C. divisa =

C. divisa may refer to:

- Carex divisa, a sedge species in the genus Carex
- Crocothemis divisa, a dragonfly species found in Africa
- Cynips divisa, a gall forming wasp species

== See also ==
- Divisa (disambiguation)
