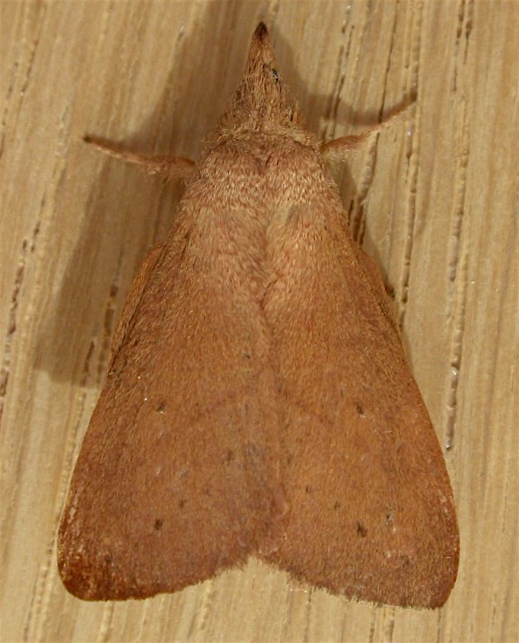
- Pararguda nasuta

Scientific classification
- Domain: Eukaryota
- Kingdom: Animalia
- Phylum: Arthropoda
- Class: Insecta
- Order: Lepidoptera
- Family: Lasiocampidae
- Genus: Pararguda; Bethune-Baker, 1908

Synonyms
- Digglesia Turner, 1911

= Pararguda =

Genus of moths

Pararguda is a genus of moths in the family Lasiocampidae. The genus was erected by George Thomas Bethune-Baker in 1908. All the species identified in this genus were found in Australia.

== Species ==
Based on Lepidoptera and Some Other Life Forms:

- Pararguda nasuta (Lewin, 1805)
- Pararguda tephropsis (Turner, 1924)
- Pararguda nana (Walker, 1855)
- Pararguda albida (Walker, 1865)
- Pararguda spodopa (Turner, 1904)
- Pararguda crocota (Turner, 1911)
- Pararguda australasiae (Fabricius, 1775)
- Pararguda rufescens (Walker, 1855)
- Pararguda crenulata (Lucas, 1894)
- Pararguda dasymalla (Turner, 1924)
- Pararguda ecnoma (Turner, 1924)
- Pararguda diamphidia (Turner, 1936)
- Pararguda nigriventris (Walker, 1862)
