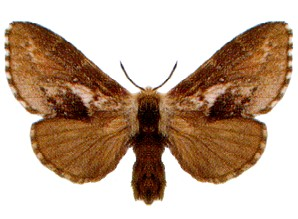
- Porela vetusta

Scientific classification
- Kingdom: Animalia
- Phylum: Arthropoda
- Class: Insecta
- Order: Lepidoptera
- Family: Lasiocampidae
- Subfamily: Lasiocampinae
- Genus: Porela; Walker, 1855

Synonyms
- Sitina Walker, 1855; Sinaga Walker, 1855; Clathe Walker, 1855; Listoca Walker, 1855; Sorema Walker, 1855; Abella Walker, 1862; Lasiomorpha Turner, 1932; Eriomorpha Fletcher, 1982

= Porela =

Genus of moths

Porela is a genus of moths in the family Lasiocampidae. The genus was erected by Francis Walker in 1855. All species are known from Australia.

== Species ==
The following species are recognised in the genus Porela:

- Porela albifinis (Walker, 1855)
- Porela amathodes Turner, 1924
- Porela ceraunias Turner, 1942
- Porela cinerea Boisduval, 1832
- Porela delineata (Walker, 1855)
- Porela euthyerges Turner, 1941
- Porela galactodes Lower, 1893
- Porela homospila Turner, 1924
- Porela notabilis (Walker, 1855)
- Porela notodontina (C.Felder & R.Felder, 1874)
- Porela obtusa (Walker, 1864) - New South Wales
- Porela rhabditis (Turner, 1932)
- Porela subfasciata (Walker, 1855)
- Porela vetusta Walker, 1855 - Queensland, New South Wales, Victoria, South Australia
- Porela vitulina (Donovan, 1805)
- BOLD:AAE2977 (Porela sp.)
- BOLD:AAN3937 (Porela sp.)
- BOLD:ABX6263 (Porela sp.)
- BOLD:ACD1490 (Porela sp.)
