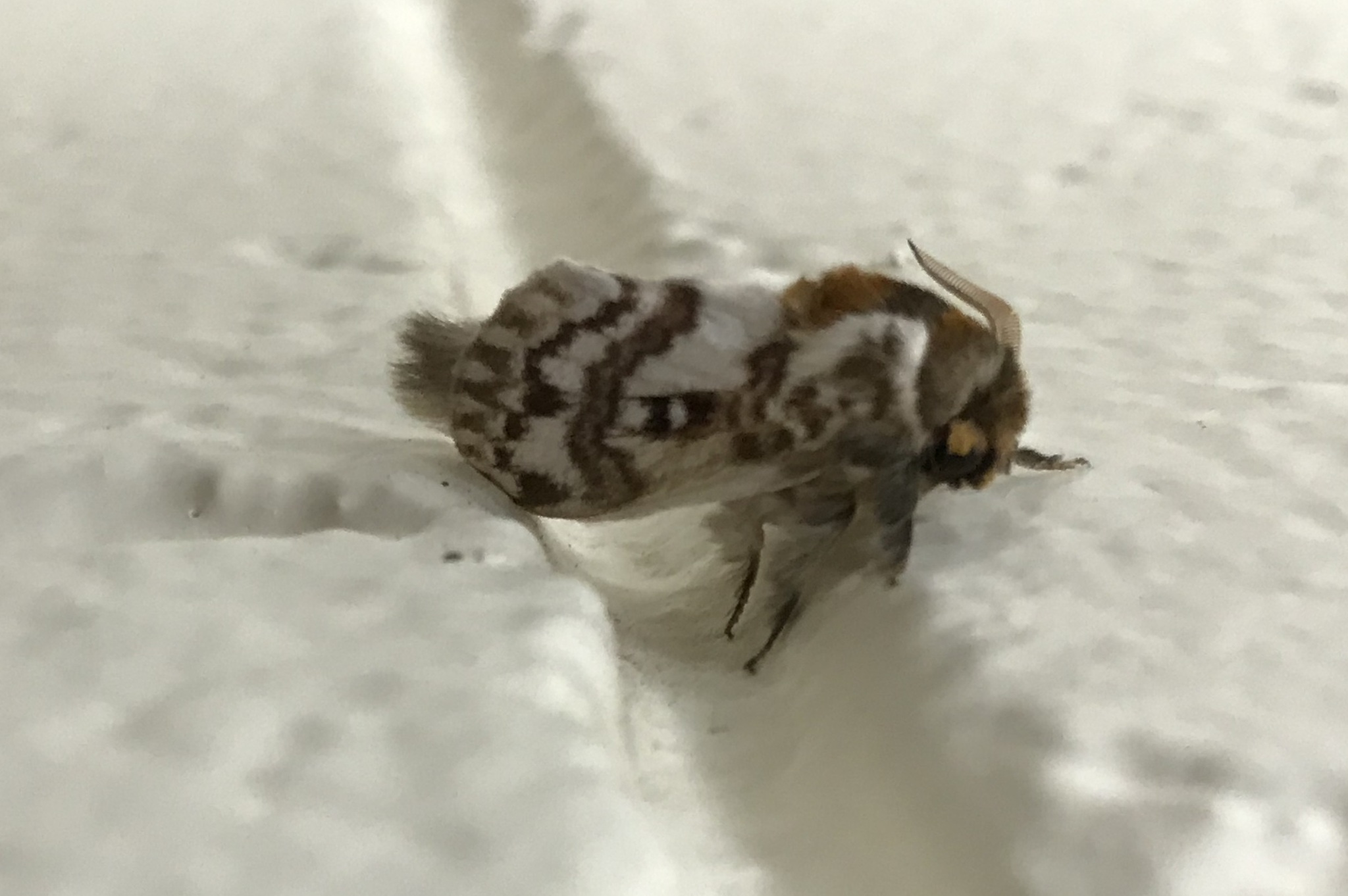
- Pernattia brevipennis

Scientific classification
- Domain: Eukaryota
- Kingdom: Animalia
- Phylum: Arthropoda
- Class: Insecta
- Order: Lepidoptera
- Family: Lasiocampidae
- Genus: Pernattia; D. S. Fletcher, 1982

= Pernattia =

Genus of moths

Pernattia is a genus of moths in the family Lasiocampidae. It was described by David Stephen Fletcher in 1982. It consists of the following species:

- Pernattia chlorophragma
- Pernattia brevipennis
- Pernattia pusilla
