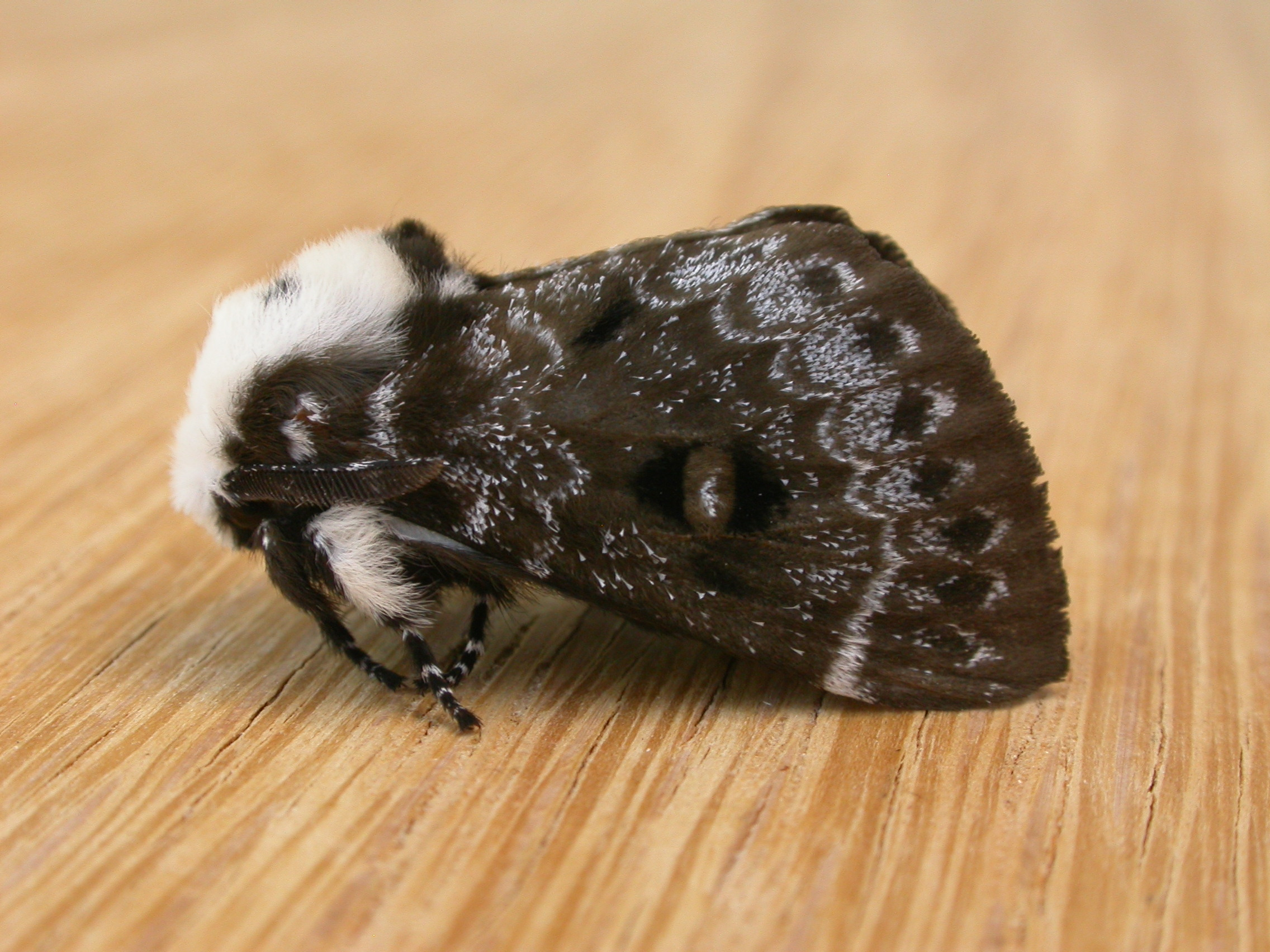
- Genduara punctigera

Scientific classification
- Kingdom: Animalia
- Phylum: Arthropoda
- Class: Insecta
- Order: Lepidoptera
- Family: Lasiocampidae
- Genus: Genduara; Walker, 1856

Synonyms
- Crexa Walker, 1866; Dichromosoma Felder, 1874

= Genduara =

Genus of moths

Genduara is a genus of moths in the family Lasiocampidae. The genus was erected by Francis Walker in 1856. All species in the genus are from Australia.

== Species ==
Based on Lepidoptera and Some Other Life Forms:

- Genduara fola (Swinhoe, 1902)
- Genduara punctigera (Walker, 1855)
- Genduara macqueeni (Turner, 1936)
- Genduara acedesta (Turner, 1911)
- Genduara contermina (Walker, 1865)
- Genduara subnotata (Walker, 1869)
- Genduara albicans (Swinhoe, 1892)
- Genduara pinnalis (Lucas, 1895)
- Genduara rhoda (Swinhoe, 1902)
- Genduara macroptila (Turner, 1911)
- Genduara dianipha (Turner, 1911)
