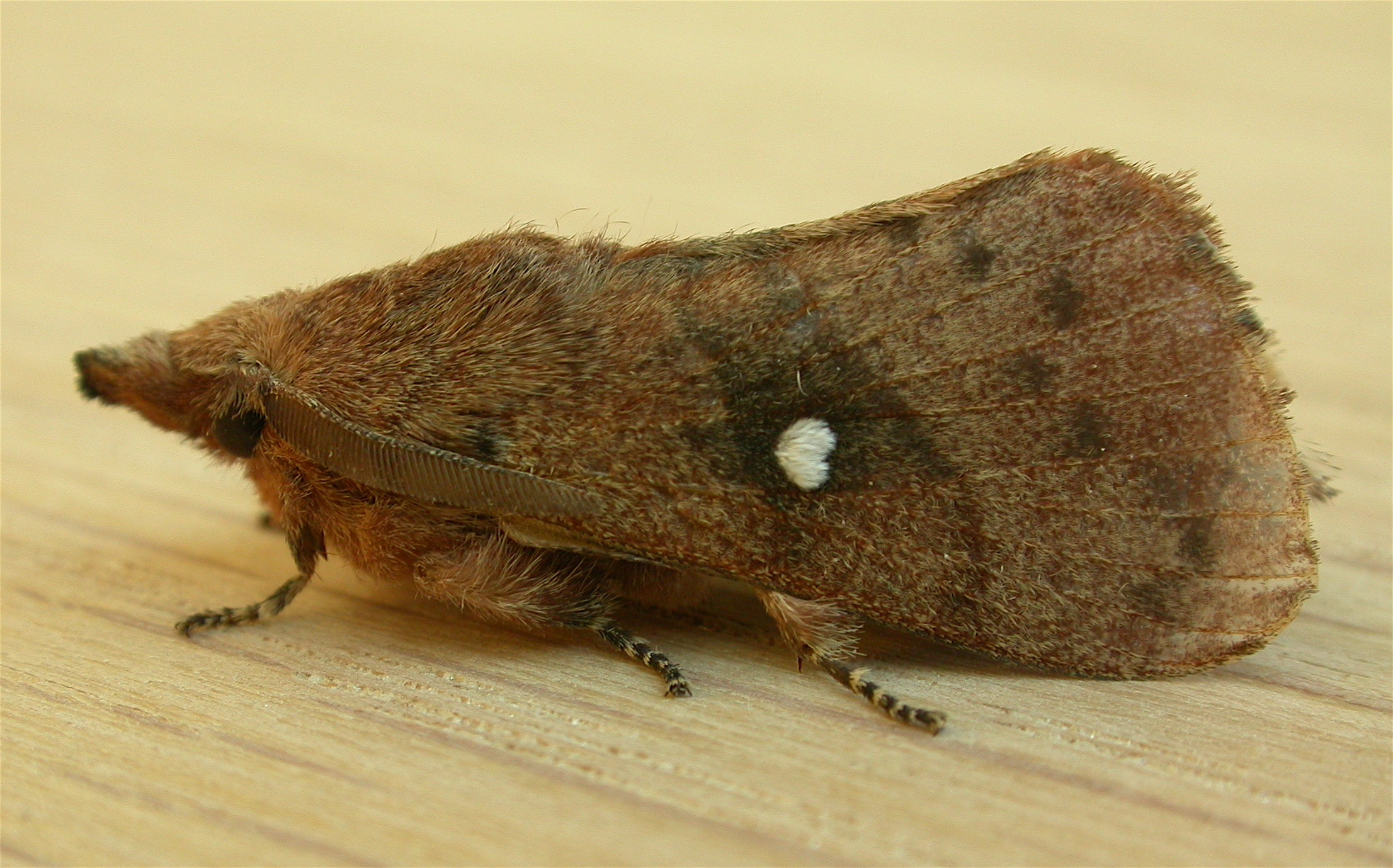
- Opsirhina lechriodes (Turner, 1911), male.

Scientific classification
- Kingdom: Animalia
- Phylum: Arthropoda
- Class: Insecta
- Order: Lepidoptera
- Family: Lasiocampidae
- Subfamily: Lasiocampinae
- Genus: Opsirhina; Walker, 1855

Synonyms
- Aspiducha Turner, 1911; Rhathymodes Turner, 1911

= Opsirhina =

Genus of moths

Opsirhina is a genus of moths in the family Lasiocampidae. It was erected by Francis Walker in 1855. All species in the genus were described from Australia.

== Species ==
Based on Lepidoptera and Some Other Life Forms:

- Opsirhina alphaea (Fabricius, 1775)
- Opsirhina albigutta Walker, 1855
- Opsirhina lechriodes (Turner, 1911)
