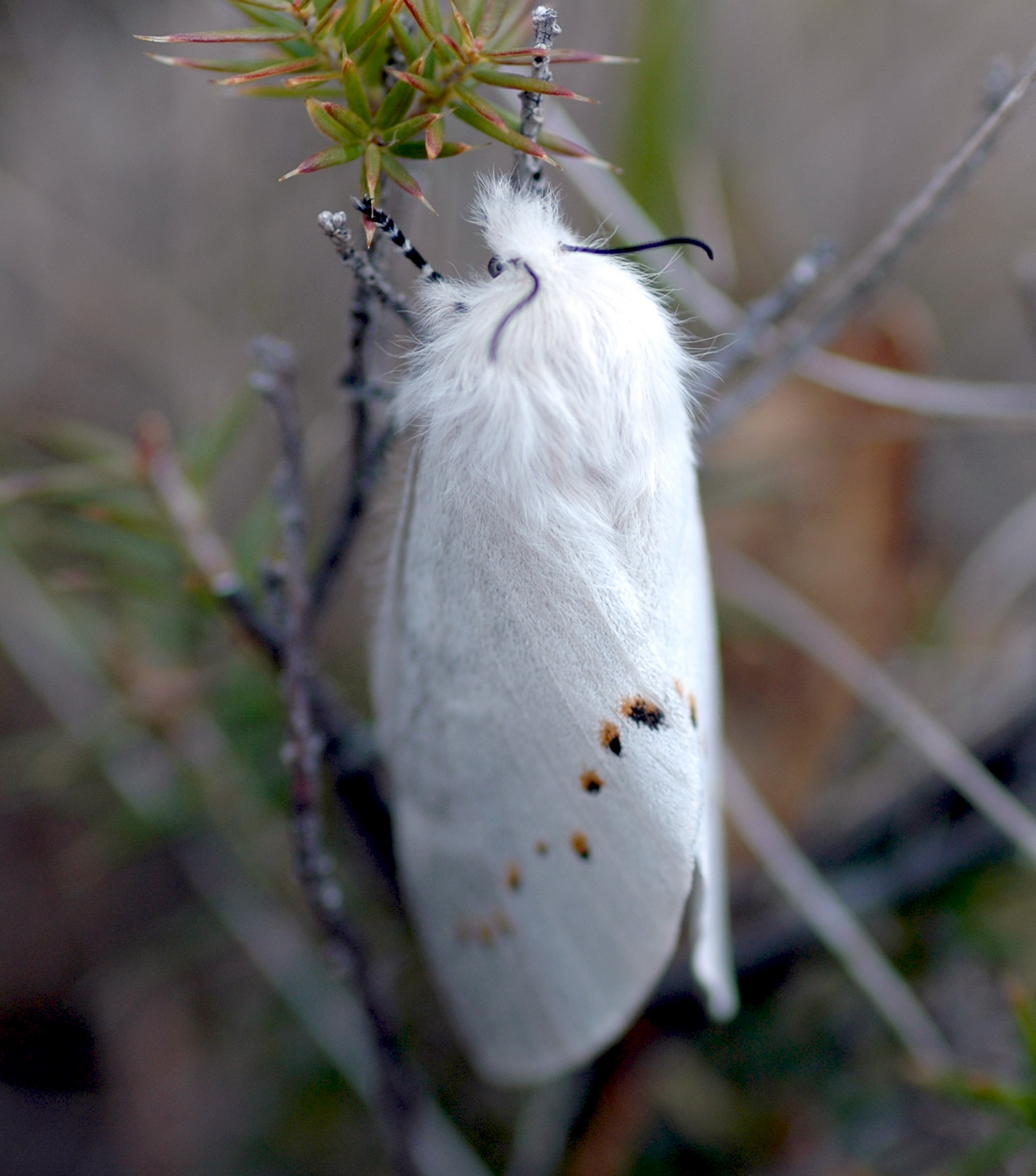
- Female Pinara cana

Scientific classification
- Kingdom: Animalia
- Phylum: Arthropoda
- Clade: Pancrustacea
- Class: Insecta
- Order: Lepidoptera
- Family: Lasiocampidae
- Genus: Pinara; Walker, 1855

Synonyms
- Rhinogyne Möschler, 1872

= Pinara (moth) =

Genus of moths

Pinara is a genus of moths in the family Lasiocampidae. The genus was erected by Francis Walker in 1855.

== Species ==
- Pinara adusta Walker, 1869
- Pinara albida Walker, 1865
- Pinara apicalis Walker, 1855
- Pinara australasiae Fabricius, 1775
- Pinara calligama Felder, 1874
- Pinara cana Walker, 1855
- Pinara chlorosacca Turner, 1902
- Pinara cinerata Walker, 1865
- Pinara cycloloma Turner, 1902
- Pinara decorata Walker, 1865
- Pinara divisa Walker, 1855
- Pinara erubescens Lower, 1894
- Pinara fervens Walker, 1855
- Pinara flexicosta Felder, 1874
- Pinara guttularis Walker, 1855
- Pinara intemerata Walker, 1865
- Pinara marginata Walker, 1855
- Pinara metaphaea Walker, 1862
- Pinara nana Walker, 1855
- Pinara nasuta Lewin, 1805
- Pinara nasutula Wallengren, 1861
- Pinara obliqua Walker, 1855
- Pinara parvigutta Walker, 1855
- Pinara plinthopa Turner, 1904
- Pinara pudorina Walker, 1865
- Pinara rubida Walker, 1865
- Pinara rufescens Butler, 1886
- Pinara rufescens Walker, 1855
- Pinara saturata Walker, 1865
- Pinara sesioides Walker, 1866
- Pinara simonis Guenée
- Pinara sobria Walker, 1865
- Pinara spodopa Turner, 1904
