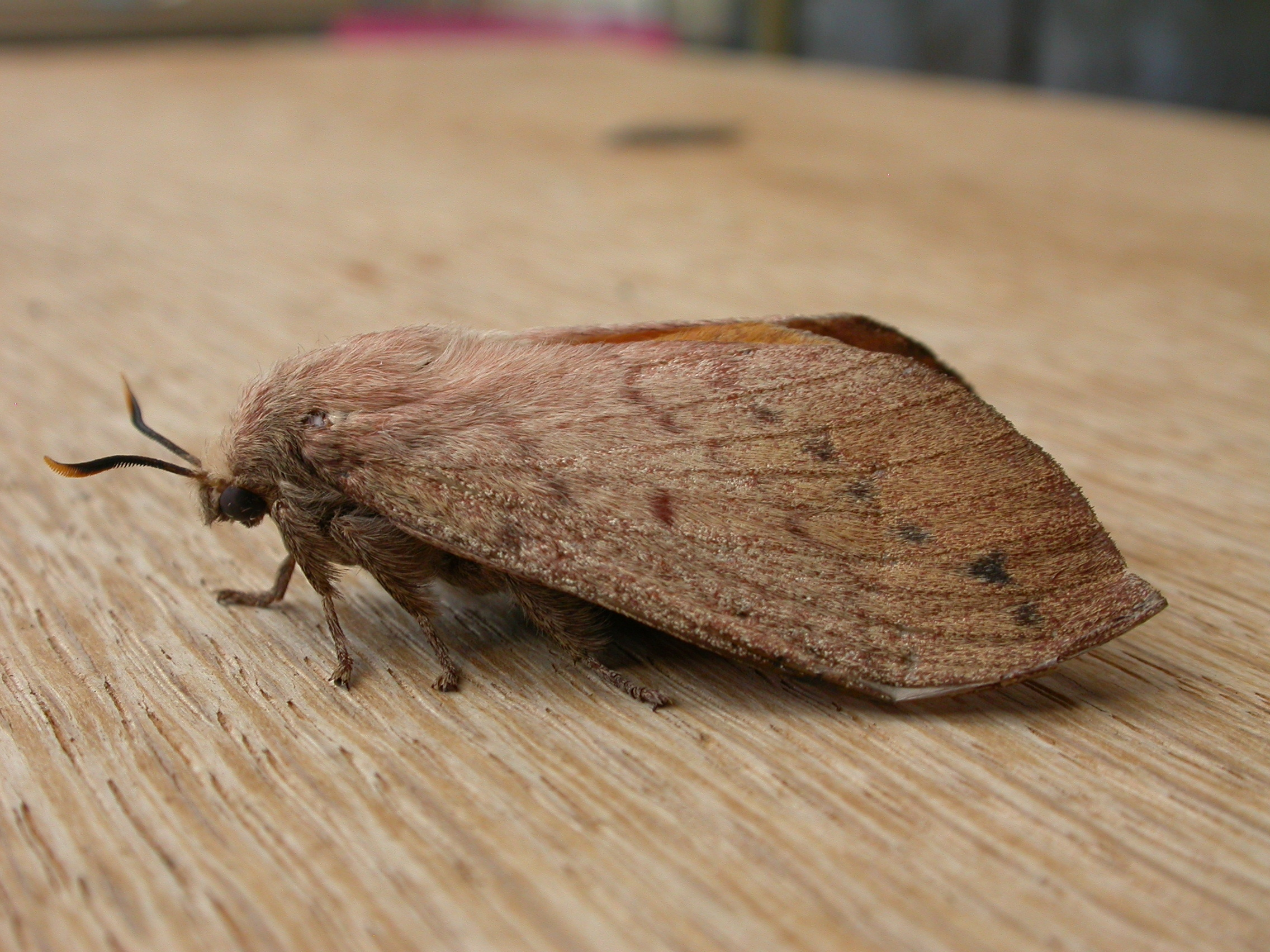
- Entometa apicalis

Scientific classification
- Kingdom: Animalia
- Phylum: Arthropoda
- Class: Insecta
- Order: Lepidoptera
- Family: Lasiocampidae
- Genus: Entometa; Walker, 1855

= Entometa =

Genus of moths

Entometa is a genus of moths in the family Lasiocampidae. The genus was erected by Francis Walker in 1855. All species are from Australia.

== Species ==
Based on Lepidoptera and Some Other Life Forms:

- Entometa fervens (Walker, 1855)
- Entometa guttularis (Walker, 1855)
- Entometa decorata (Walker, 1865)
- Entometa apicalis (Walker, 1855)
- Entometa guerinii (Le Guillou, 1841)
- Entometa chlorosacca Turner, 1924
