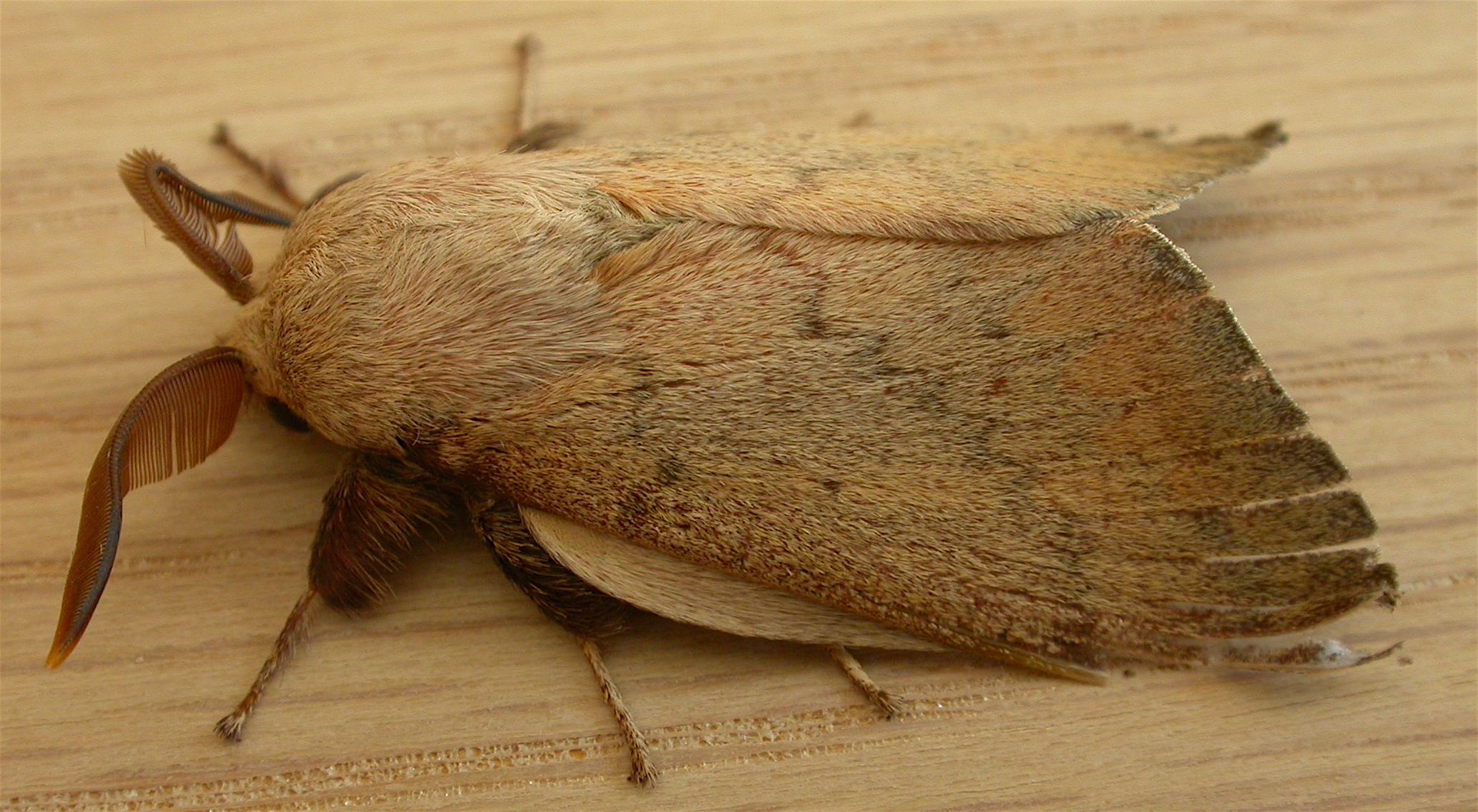

Scientific classification
- Kingdom: Animalia
- Phylum: Arthropoda
- Class: Insecta
- Order: Lepidoptera
- Family: Lasiocampidae
- Genus: Entometa
- Species: E. apicalis

Binomial name
- Entometa apicalis Walker, 1855

= Entometa apicalis =

Species of moth

Entometa apicalis is a species of moth of the family Lasiocampidae. It is found in Australia, including Tasmania.

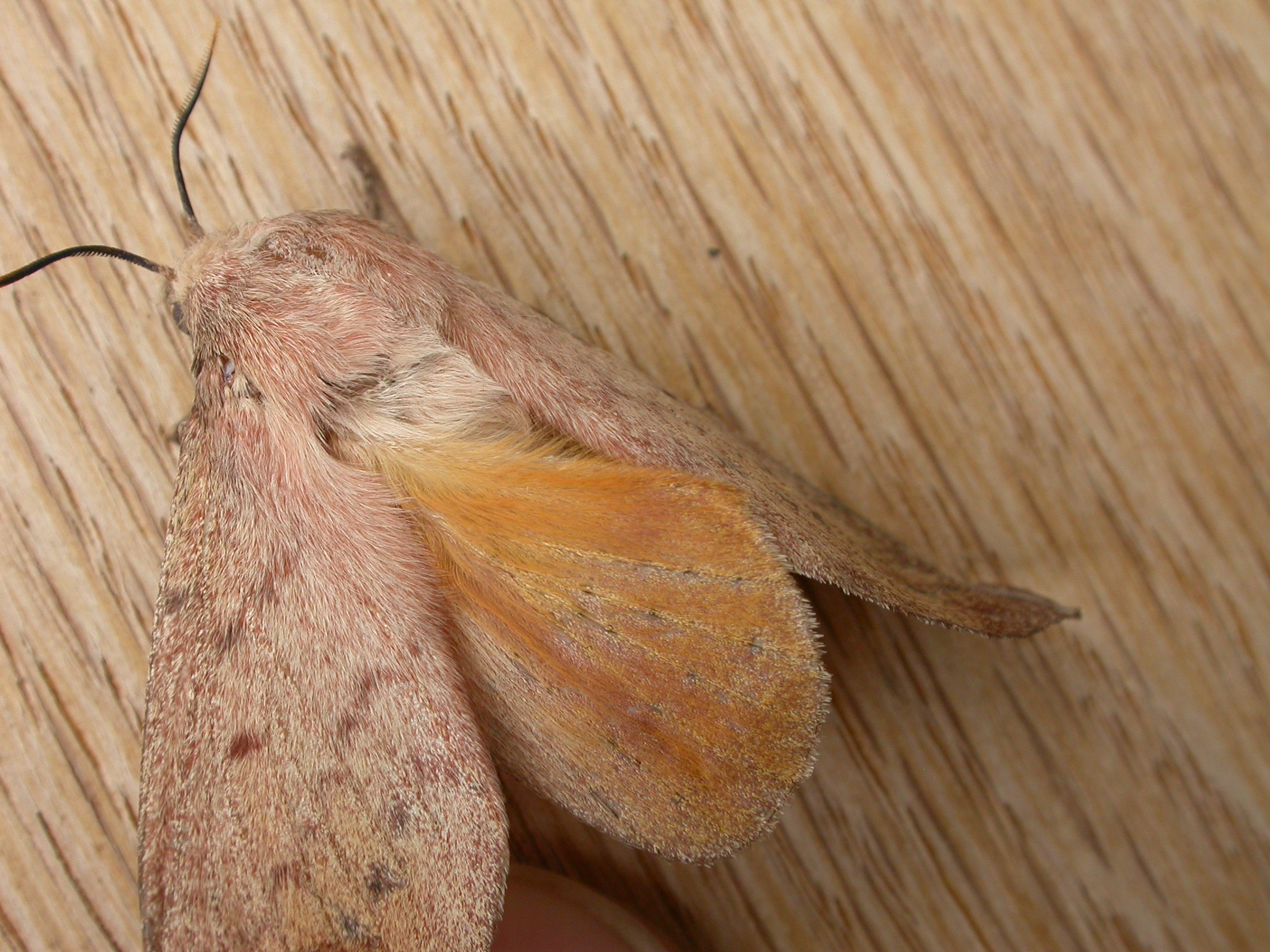
Detail

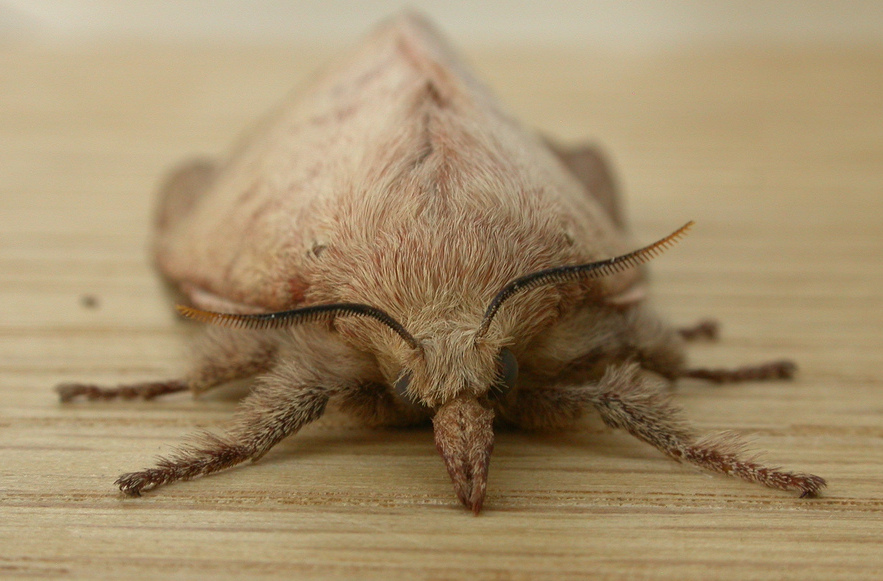
Frontal view

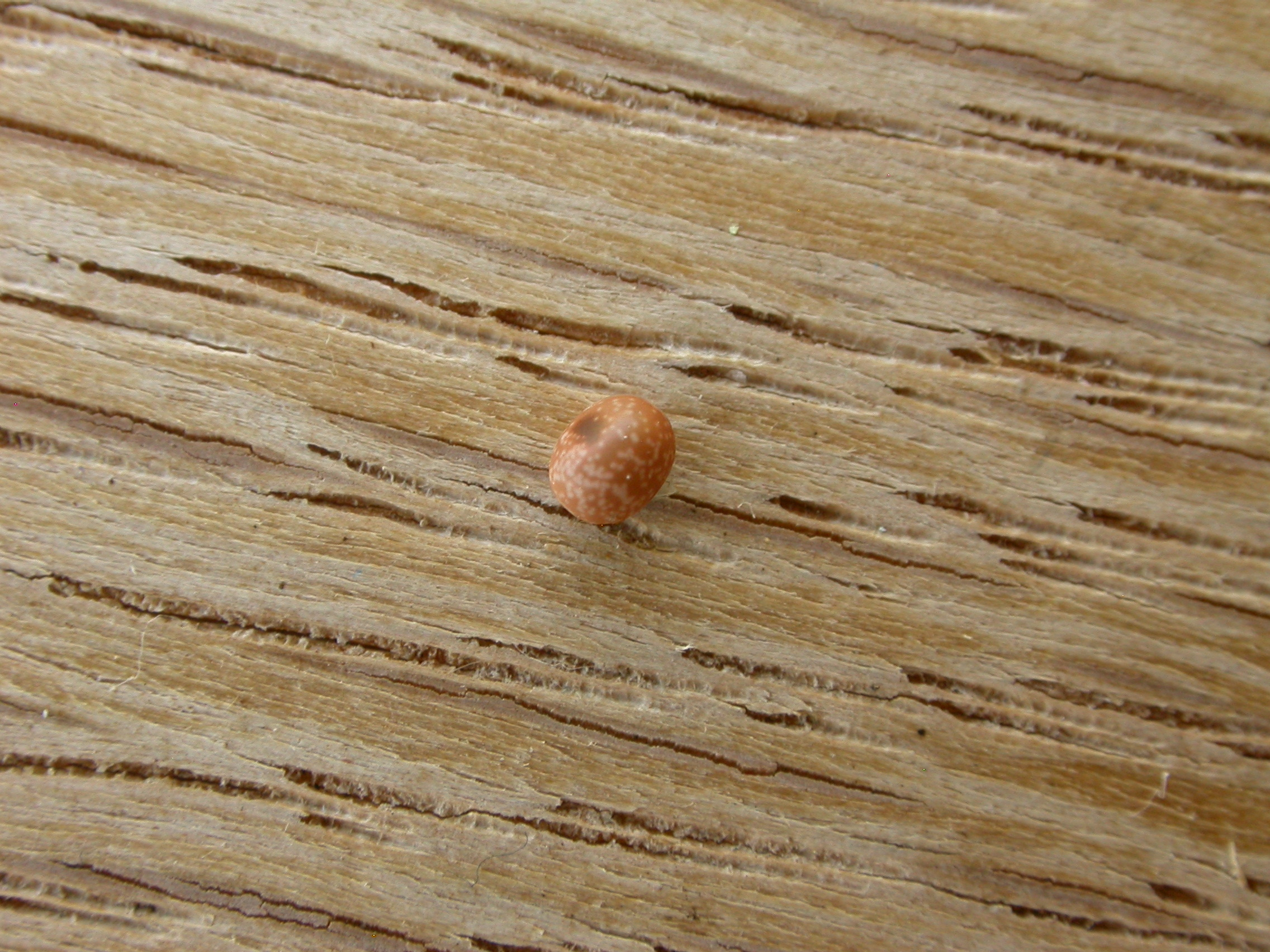
Egg

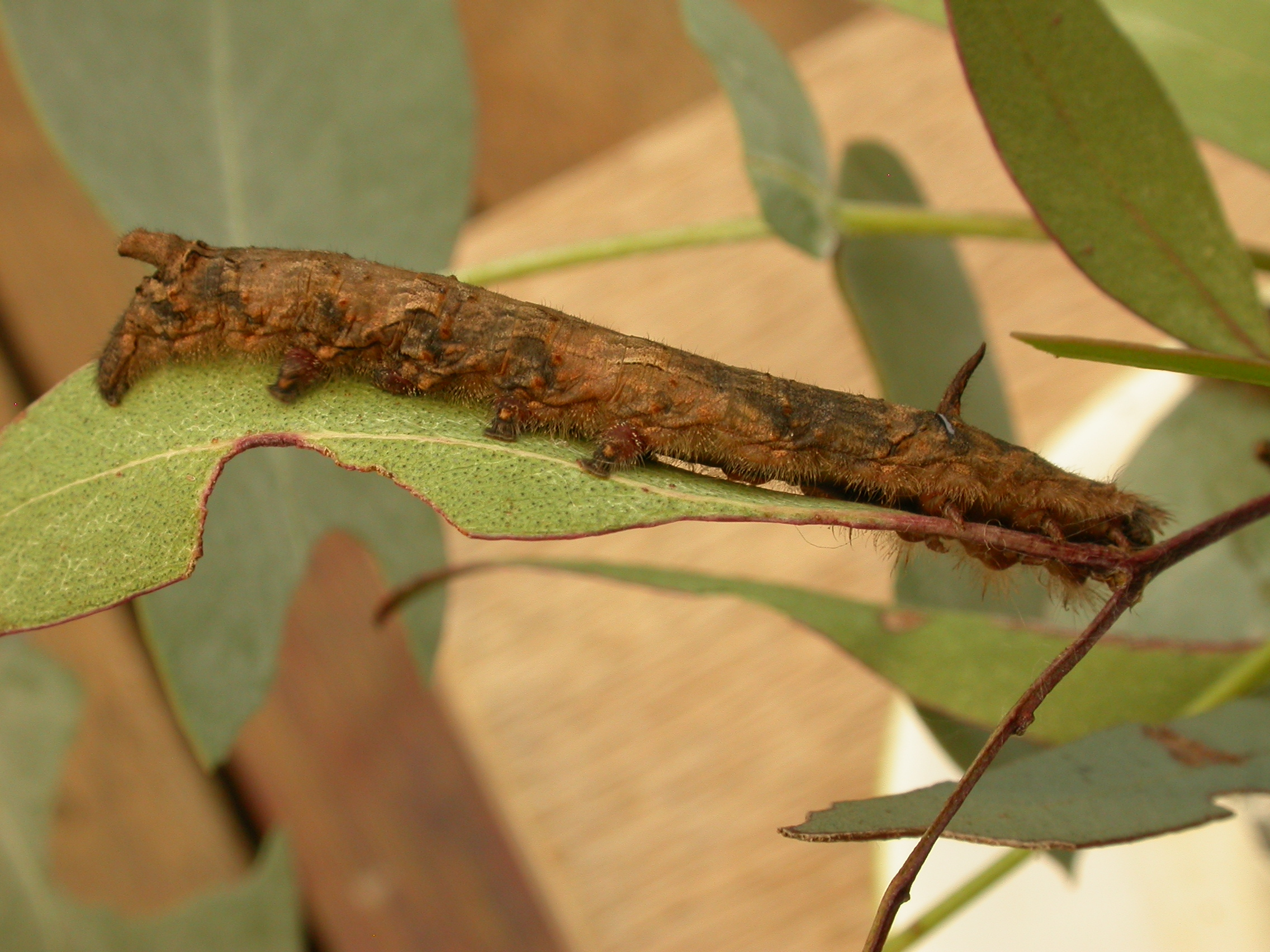
Larva

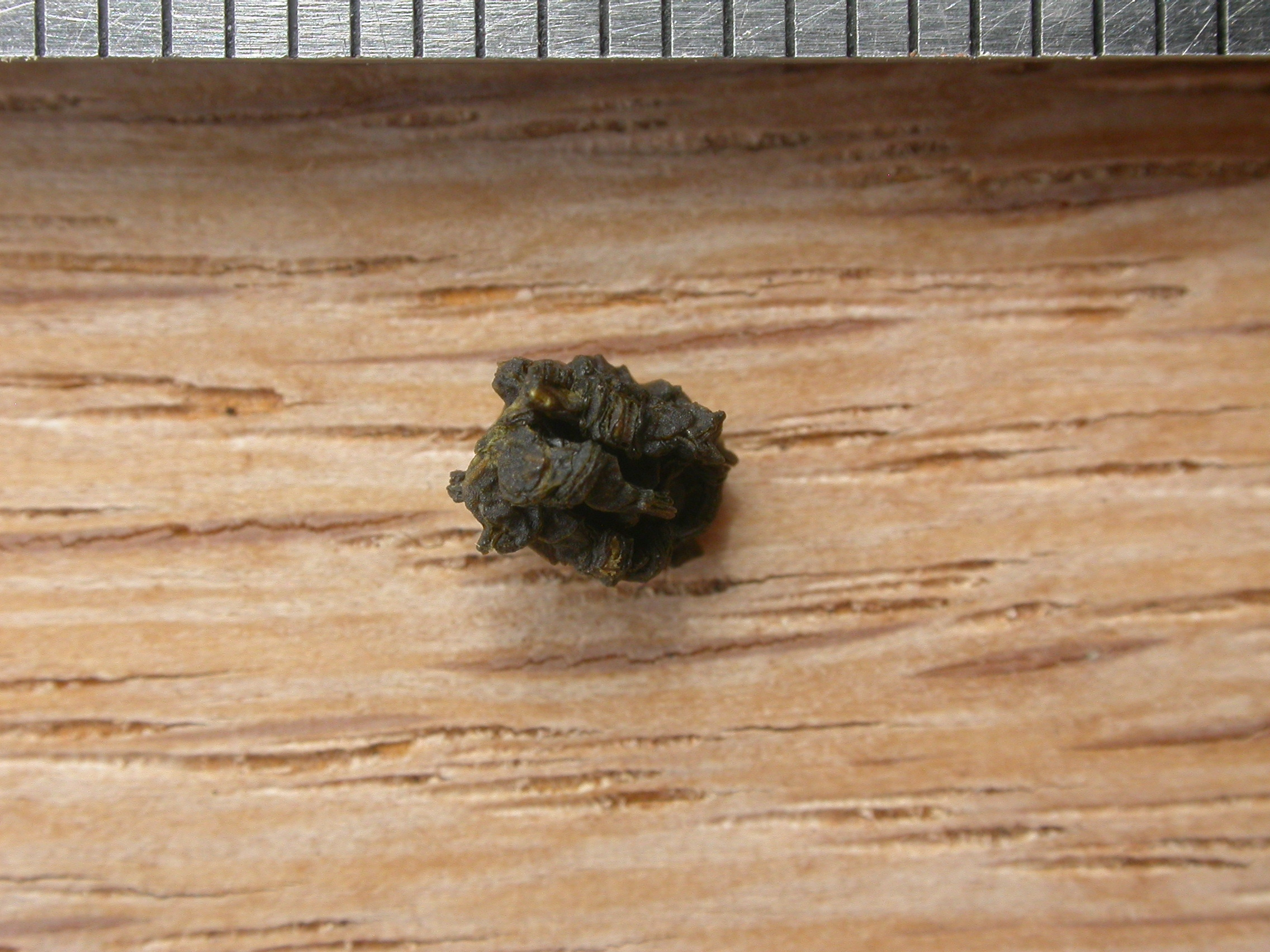
Frass

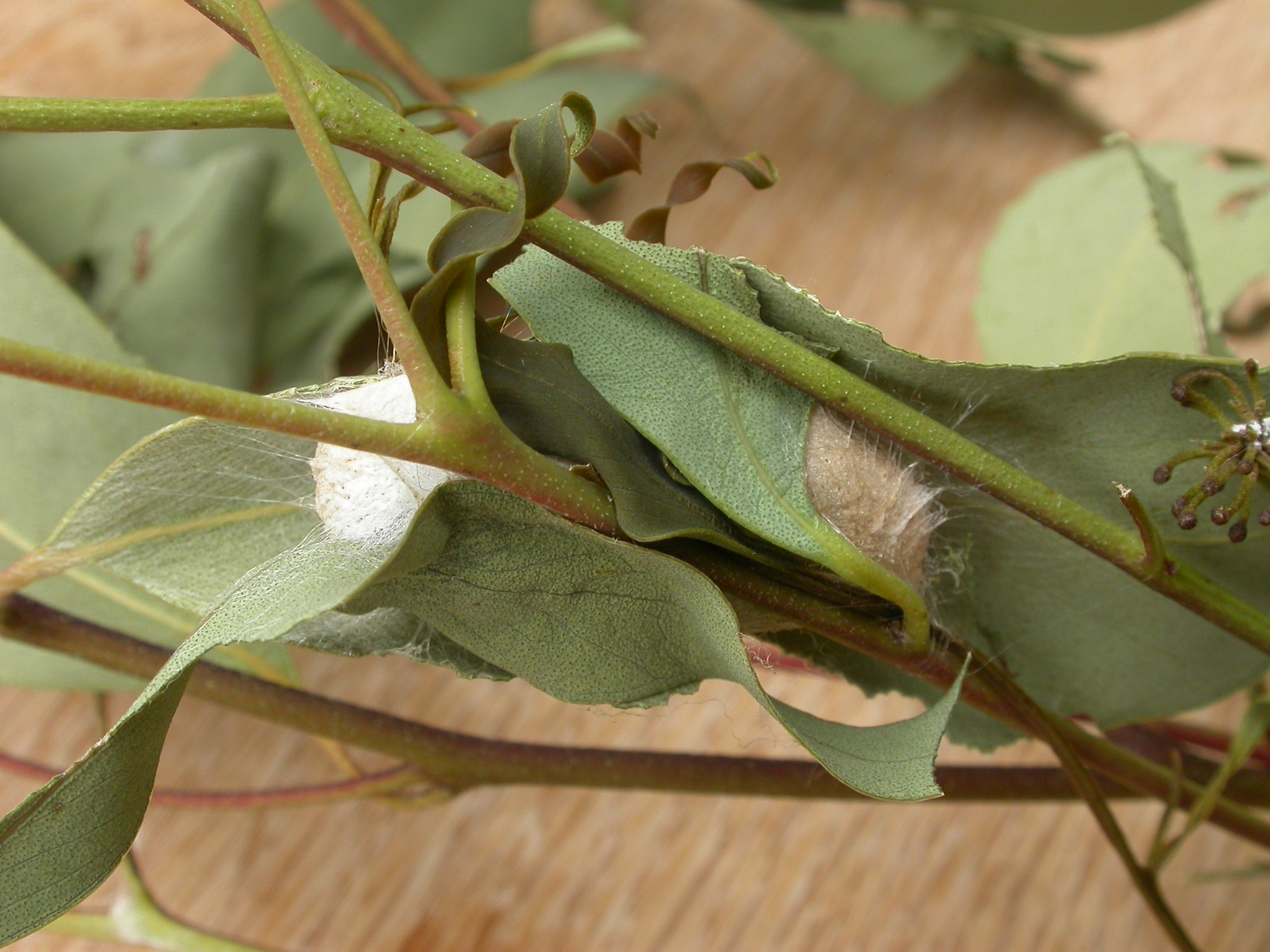
Cocoon
