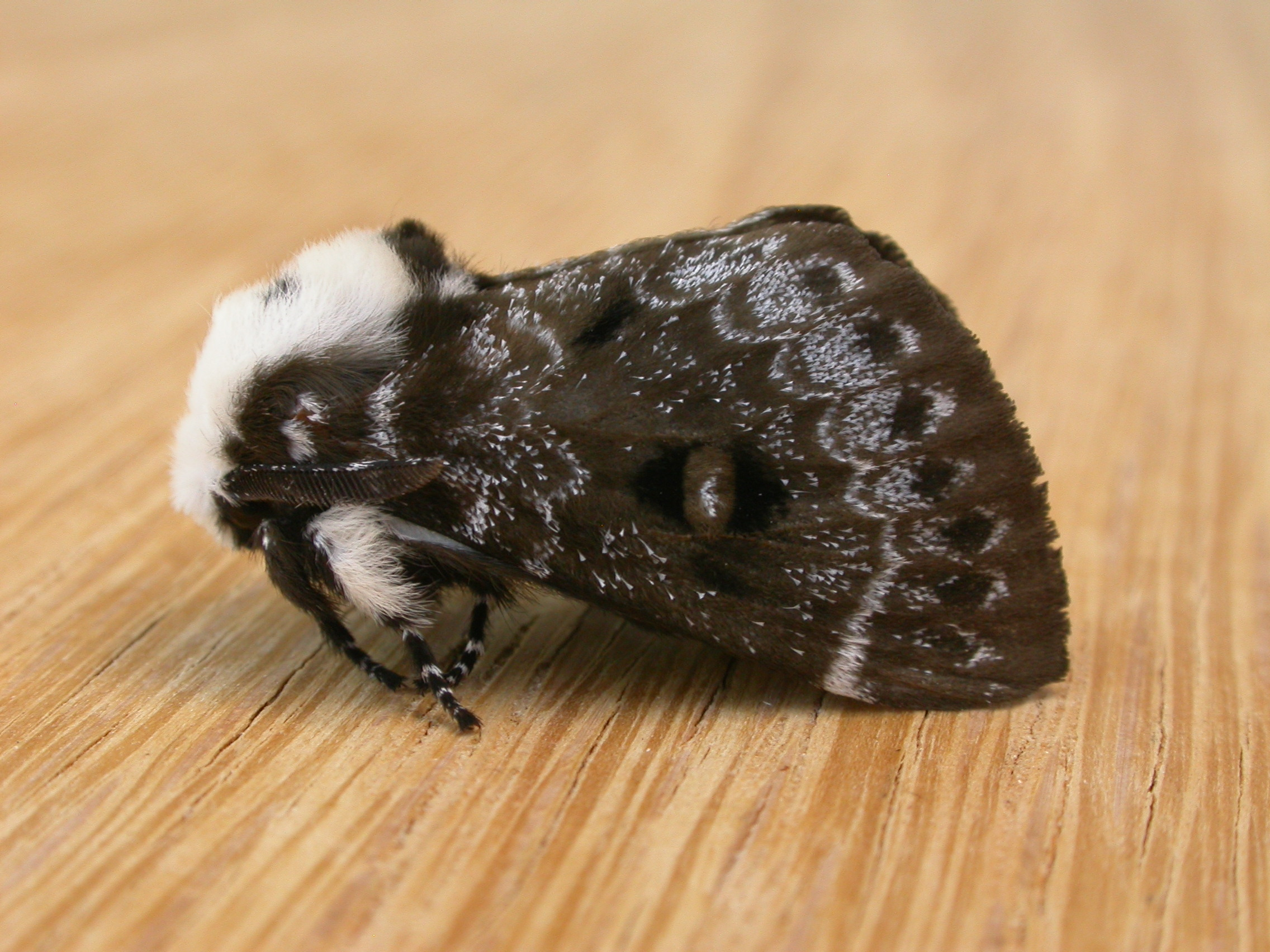

Scientific classification
- Kingdom: Animalia
- Phylum: Arthropoda
- Class: Insecta
- Order: Lepidoptera
- Family: Lasiocampidae
- Genus: Genduara
- Species: G. punctigera

Binomial name
- Genduara punctigera Walker, 1855

Synonyms
- Crexa anthraxoides

= Genduara punctigera =

Species of moth

Genduara punctigera is a species of moth of the family Lasiocampidae. It is found in the south-east quarter of Australia.

The wingspan is about 50 mm.

The larvae feed on Exocarpus cupressiformis.
