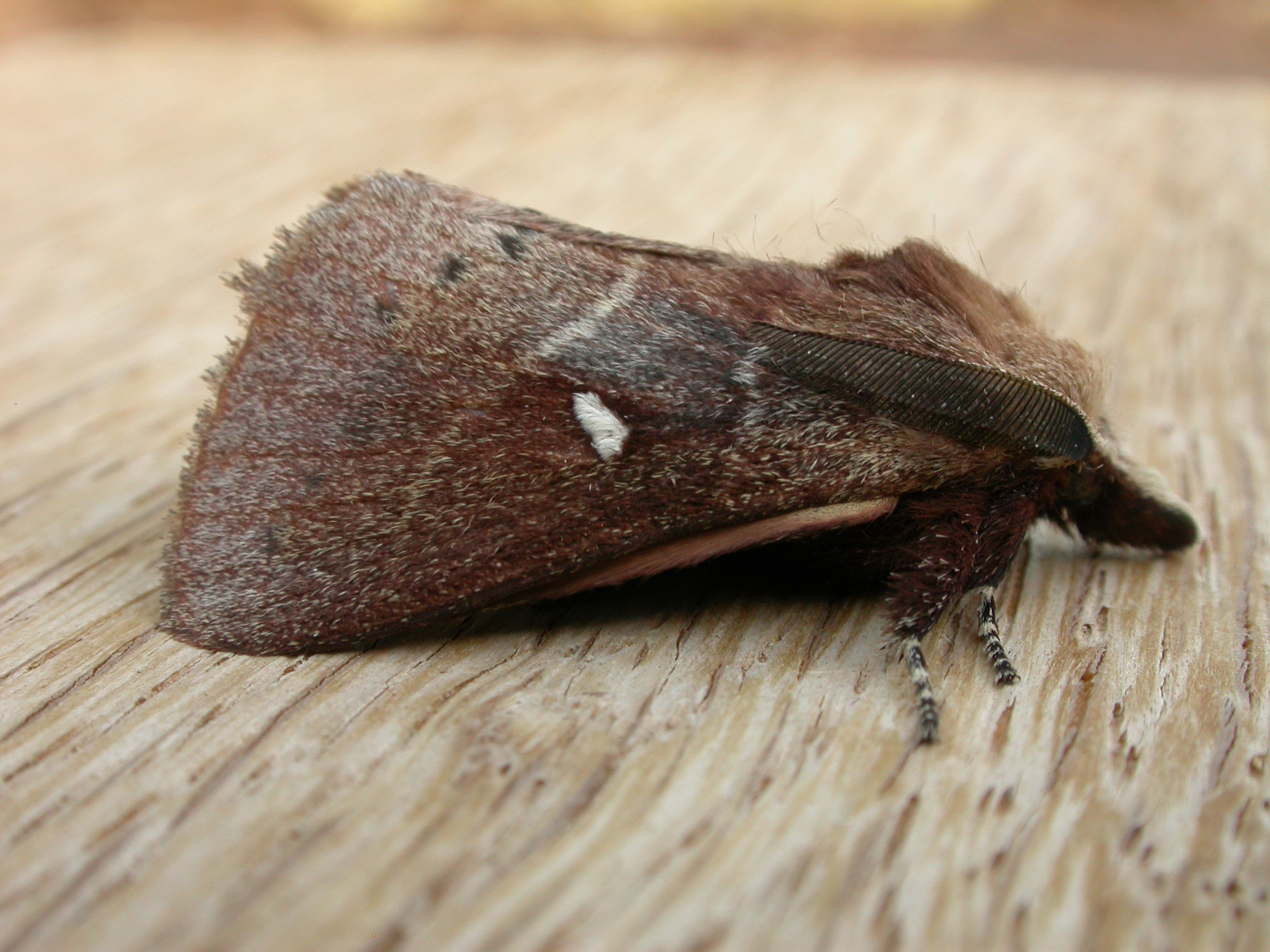

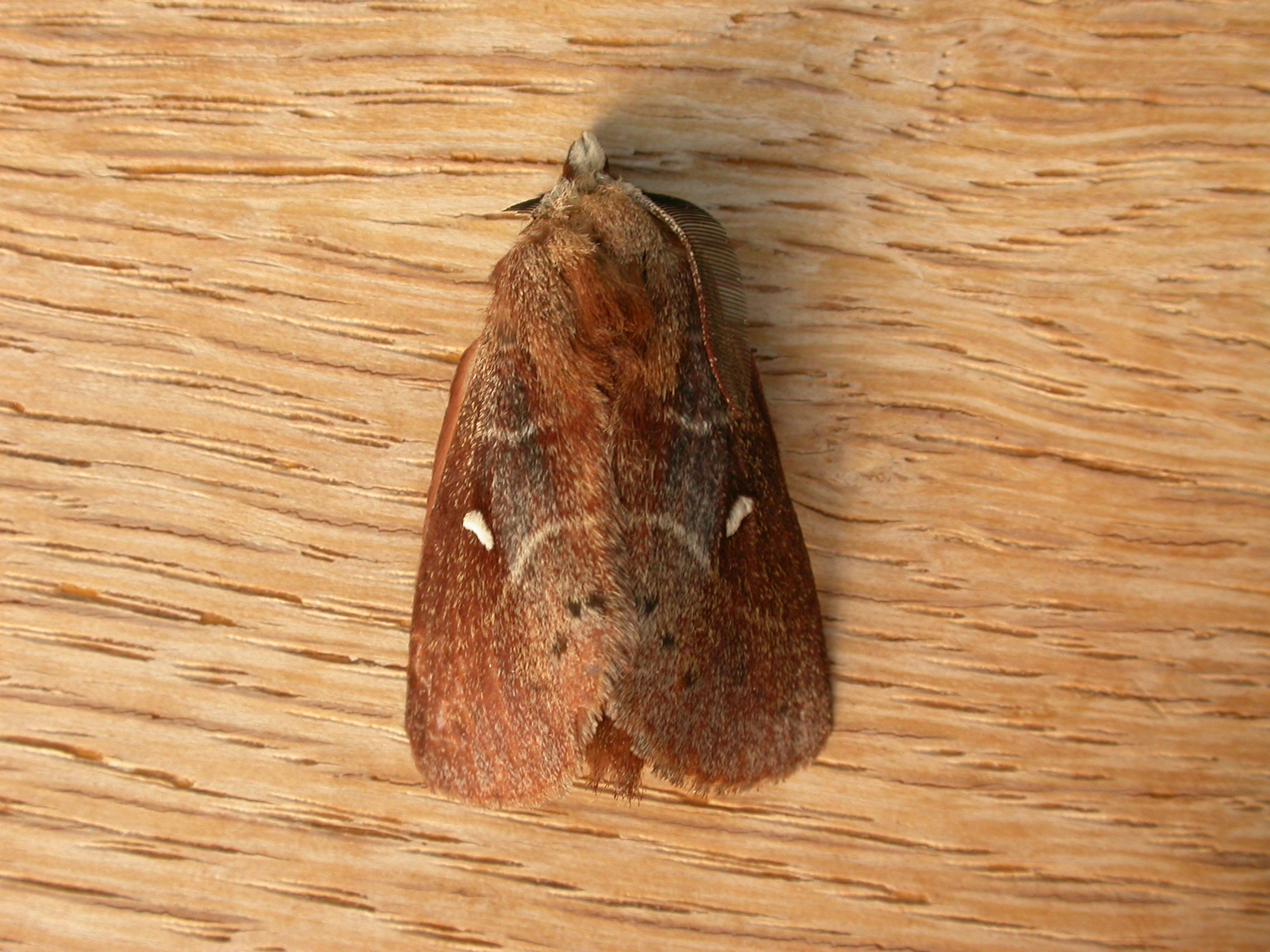

Scientific classification
- Kingdom: Animalia
- Phylum: Arthropoda
- Class: Insecta
- Order: Lepidoptera
- Family: Lasiocampidae
- Genus: Opsirhina
- Species: O. albigutta

Binomial name
- Opsirhina albigutta Walker, 1855

= Opsirhina albigutta =

Species of moth

Opsirhina albigutta is a moth of the family Lasiocampidae. It is known from Australia, including the Australian Capital Territory, Tasmania and Victoria.

The wingspan is about 40 mm for males and 50 mm for females.

The larvae have been recorded feeding on the leaves of Eucalyptus species.
