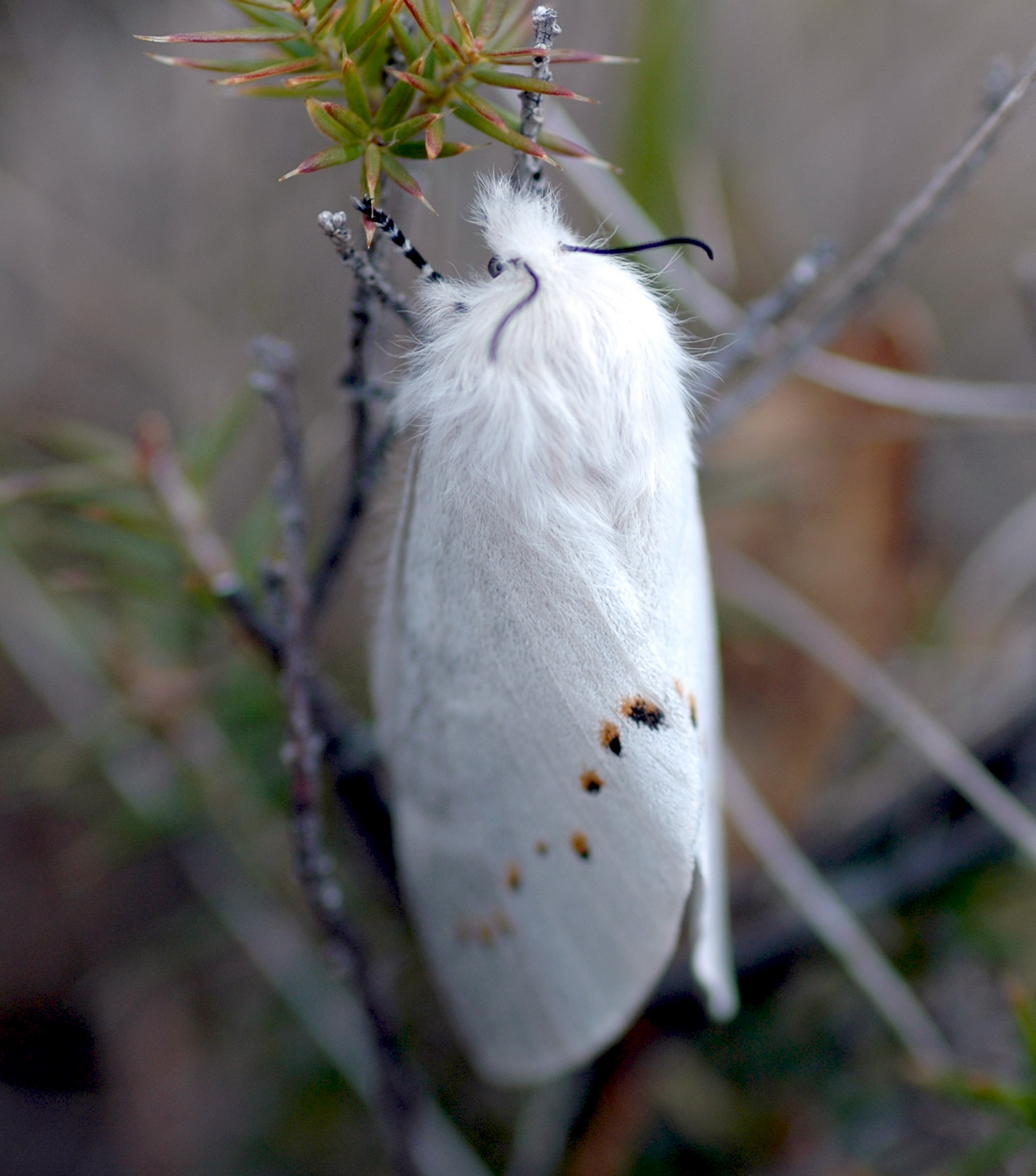

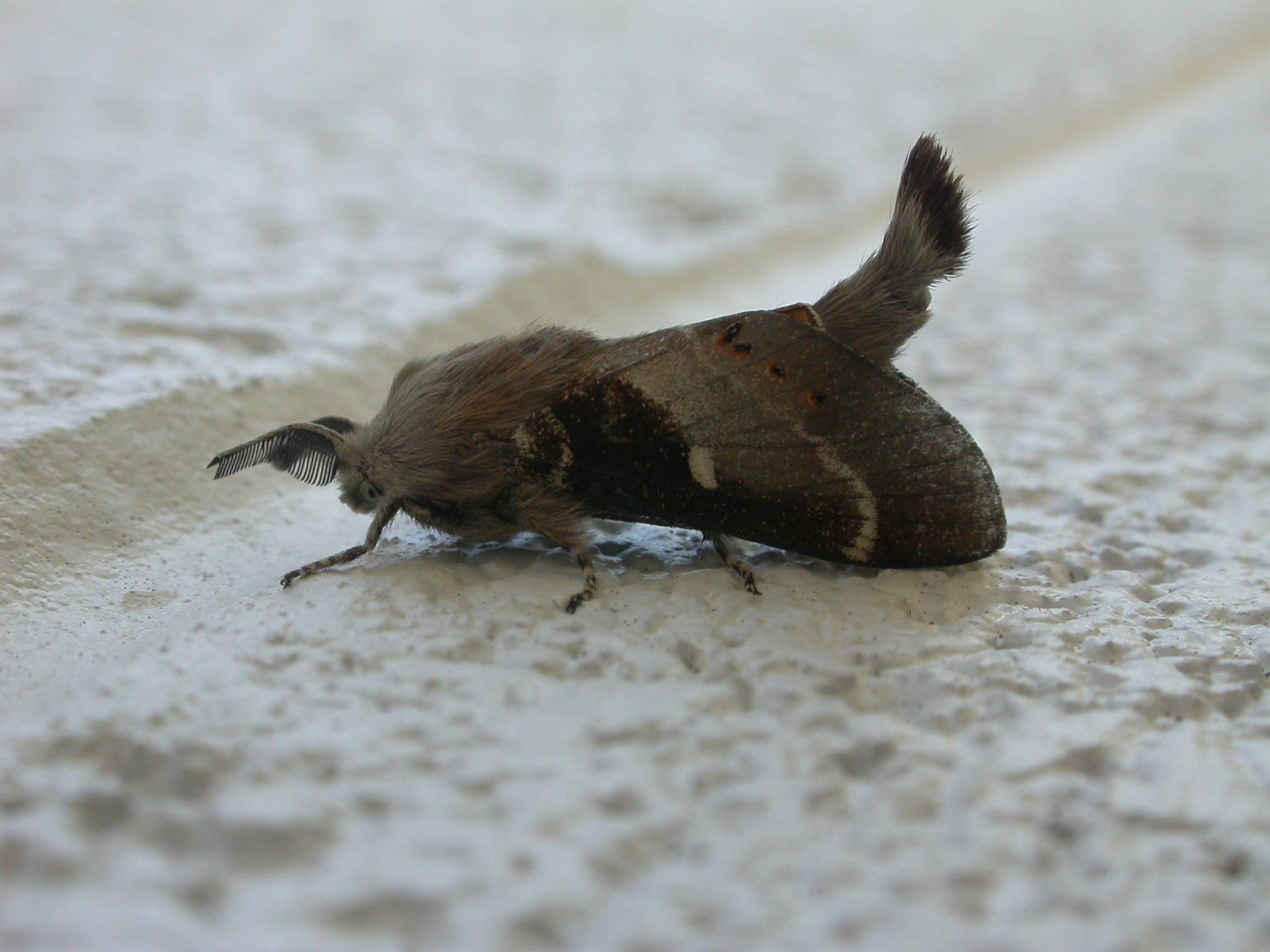

Scientific classification
- Kingdom: Animalia
- Phylum: Arthropoda
- Class: Insecta
- Order: Lepidoptera
- Family: Lasiocampidae
- Genus: Pinara
- Species: P. cana

Binomial name
- Pinara cana Walker, 1855

= Pinara cana =

Species of moth

Pinara cana, the neat pinara, is a species of moth of the family Lasiocampidae first described by Francis Walker in 1855. It is found in the south-east quarter of Australia.

The wingspan is about 40 mm for males and 60 mm for females.

The larvae feed on eucalyptus species.
