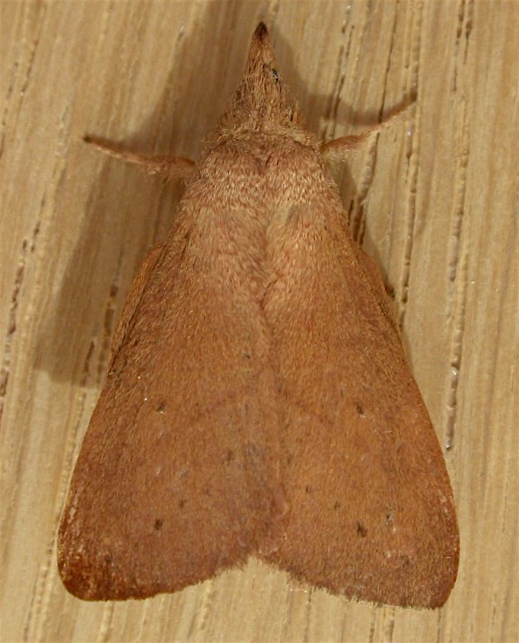

Scientific classification
- Domain: Eukaryota
- Kingdom: Animalia
- Phylum: Arthropoda
- Class: Insecta
- Order: Lepidoptera
- Family: Lasiocampidae
- Genus: Pararguda
- Species: P. nasuta

Binomial name
- Pararguda nasuta Turner, 1911

= Pararguda nasuta =

Wattle snout moth

Species of moth

Pararguda nasuta, the wattle snout moth, is a species of moth of the family Lasiocampidae. It is found in the south-east quarter of Australia.

The wingspan is about 50 mm.

The larvae feed on Exocarpus cupressiformis, Pinus radiata and Acacia species.
