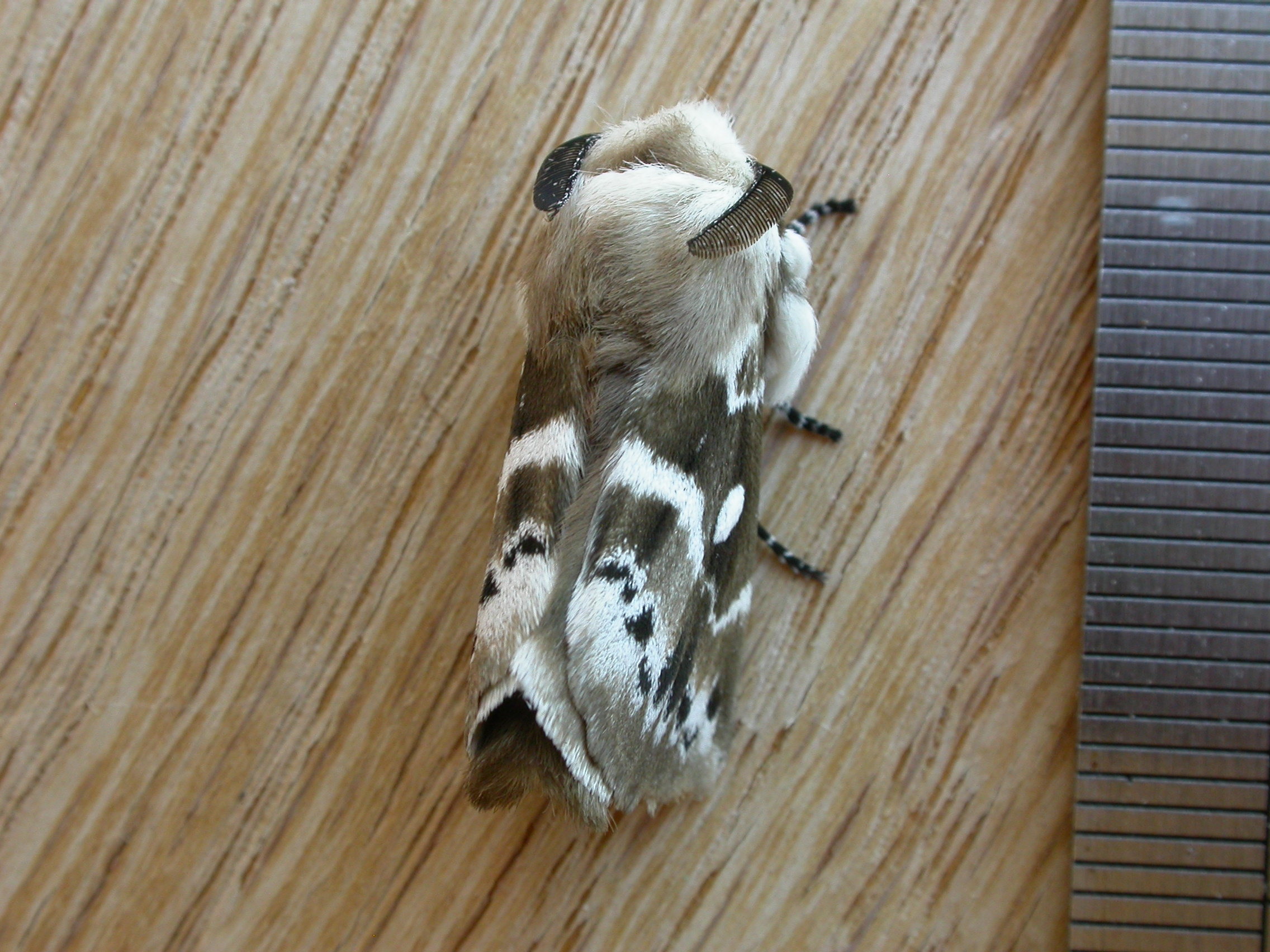

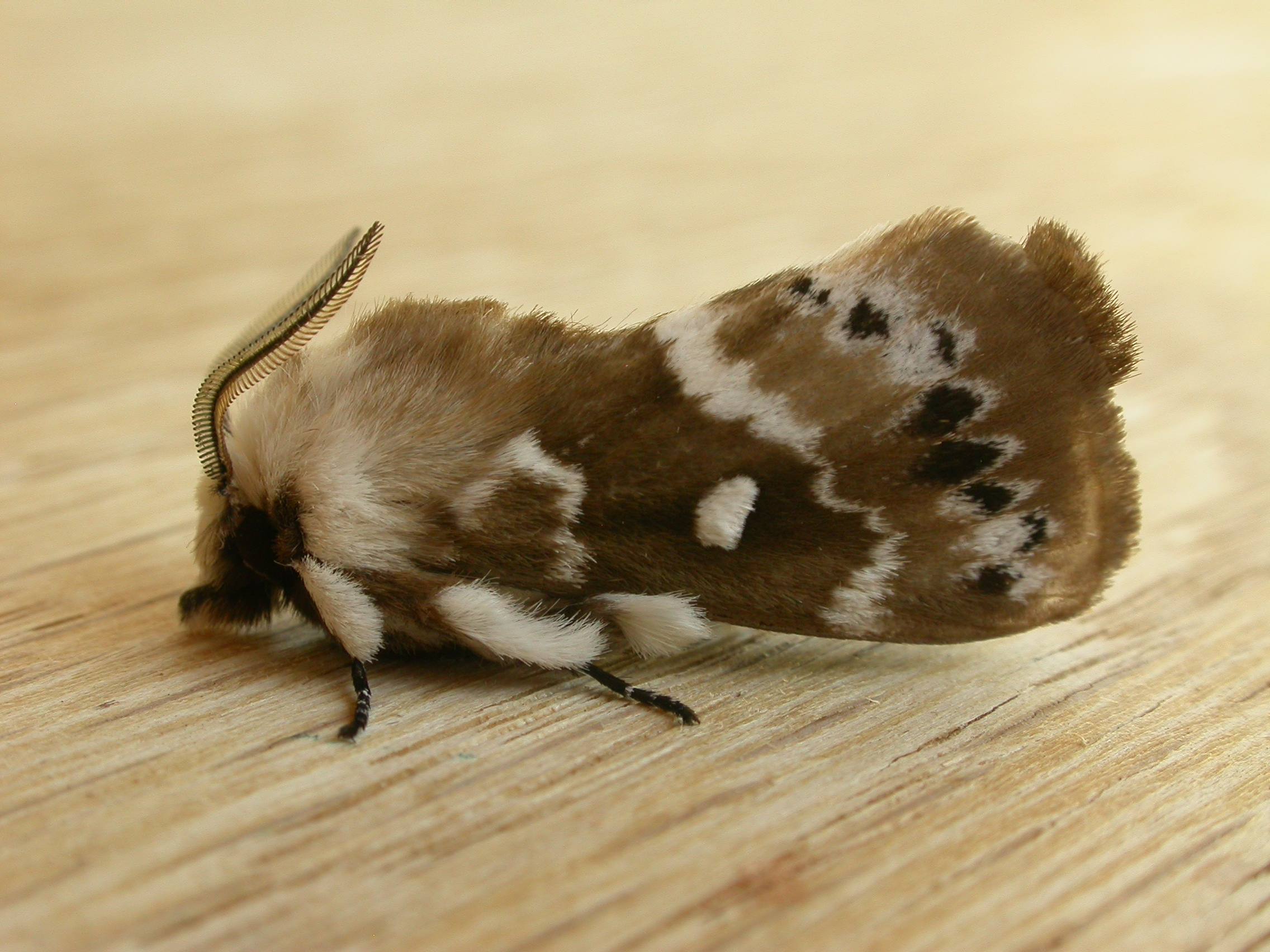

Scientific classification
- Kingdom: Animalia
- Phylum: Arthropoda
- Class: Insecta
- Order: Lepidoptera
- Family: Lasiocampidae
- Genus: Porela
- Species: P. subfasciata

Binomial name
- Porela subfasciata (Walker, 1855)

Synonyms
- Sinaga subfasciata Walker, 1855; Bombyx barnardi Lucas, 1895

= Porela subfasciata =

Species of moth

Porela subfasciata, the fasciated porela, is a species of moth of the family Lasiocampidae. It was first described by (Francis Walker in 1855 and is known from the Australian states of Tasmania and Victoria.

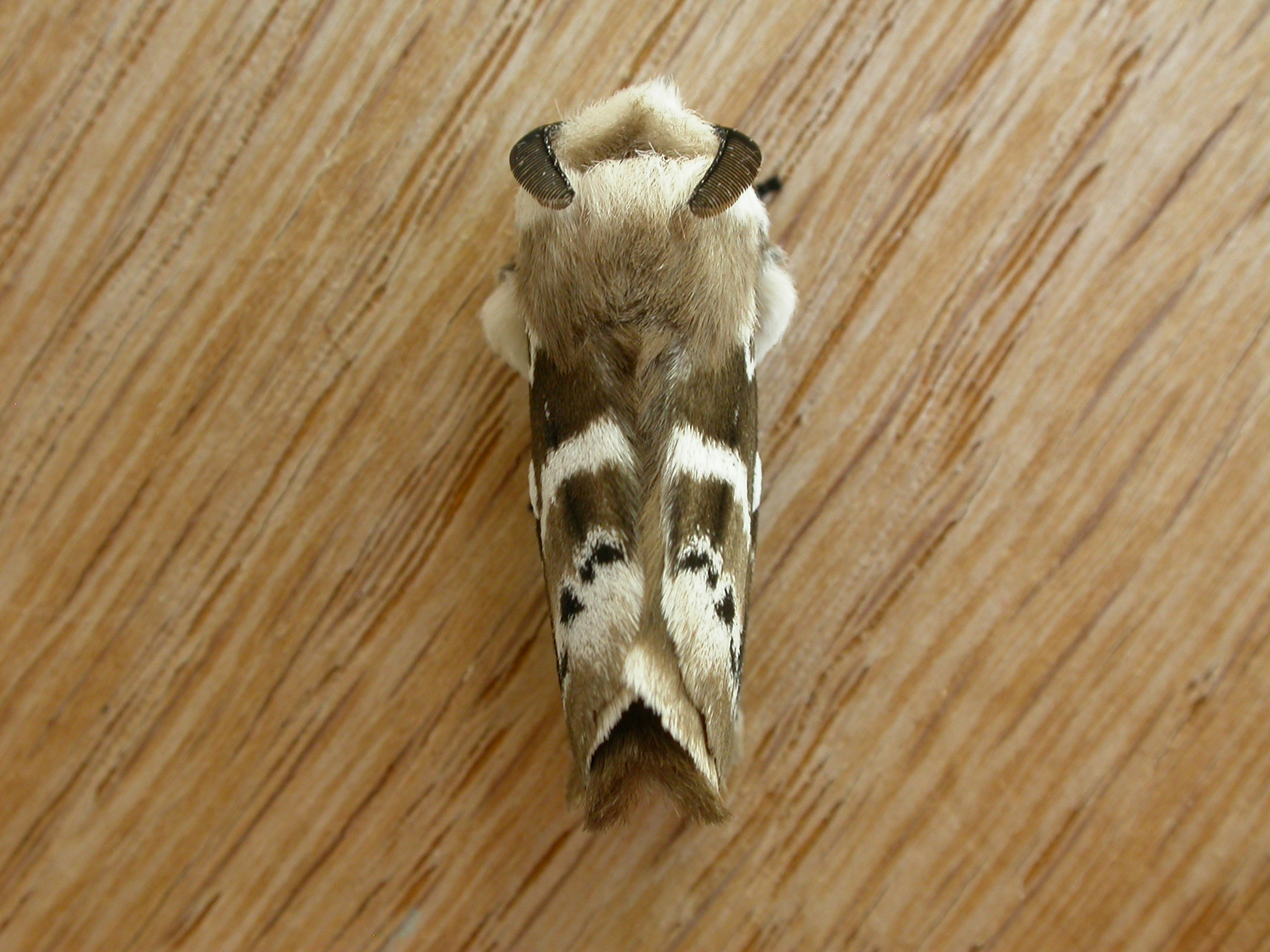

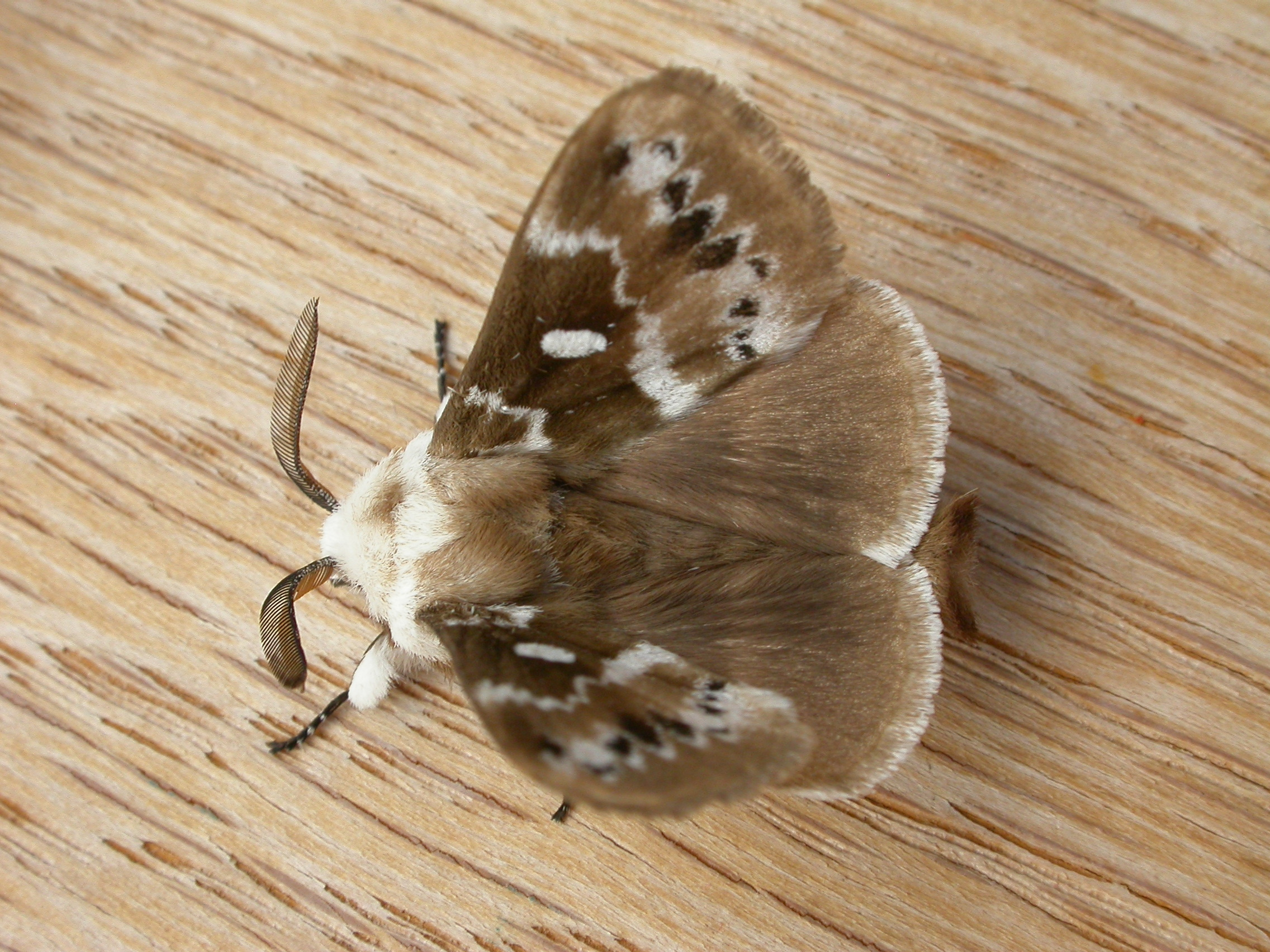

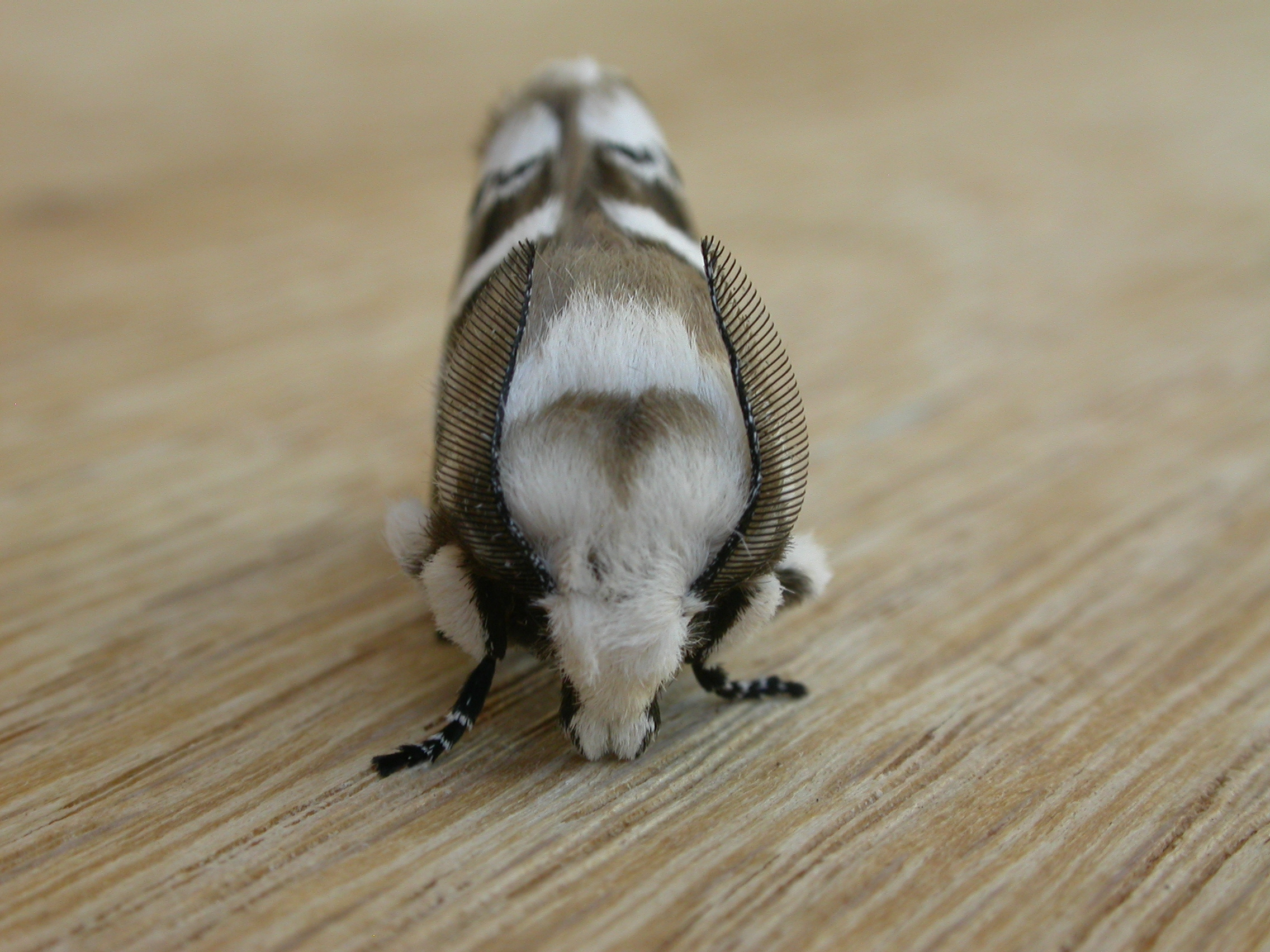

The wingspan is about 30 mm for males and about 40 mm for females.
