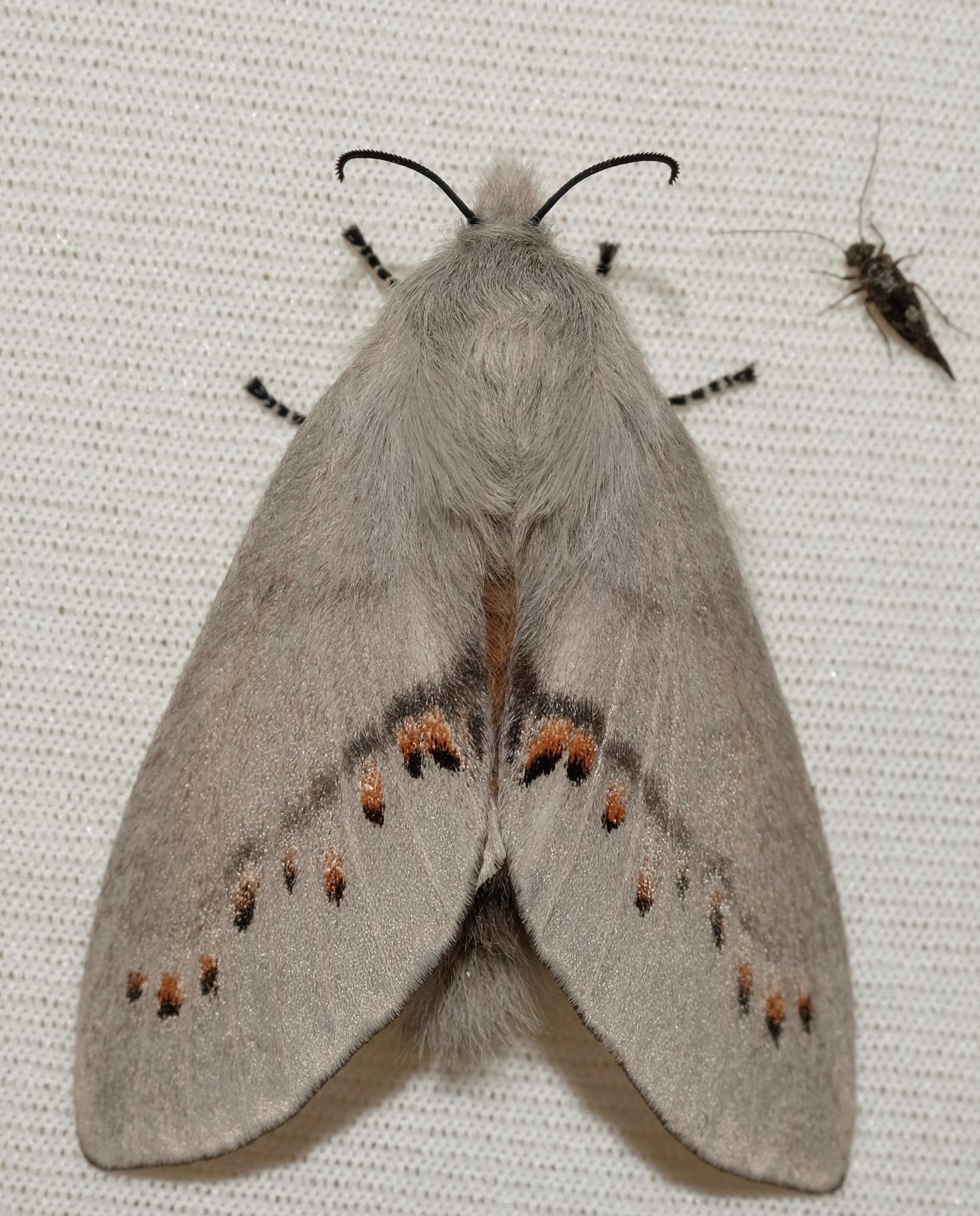

Scientific classification
- Kingdom: Animalia
- Phylum: Arthropoda
- Class: Insecta
- Order: Lepidoptera
- Family: Lasiocampidae
- Genus: Pinara
- Species: P. obliqua

Binomial name
- Pinara obliqua (Walker, 1855)

= Pinara obliqua =

Species of moth

Pinara obliqua is a species of moth.
