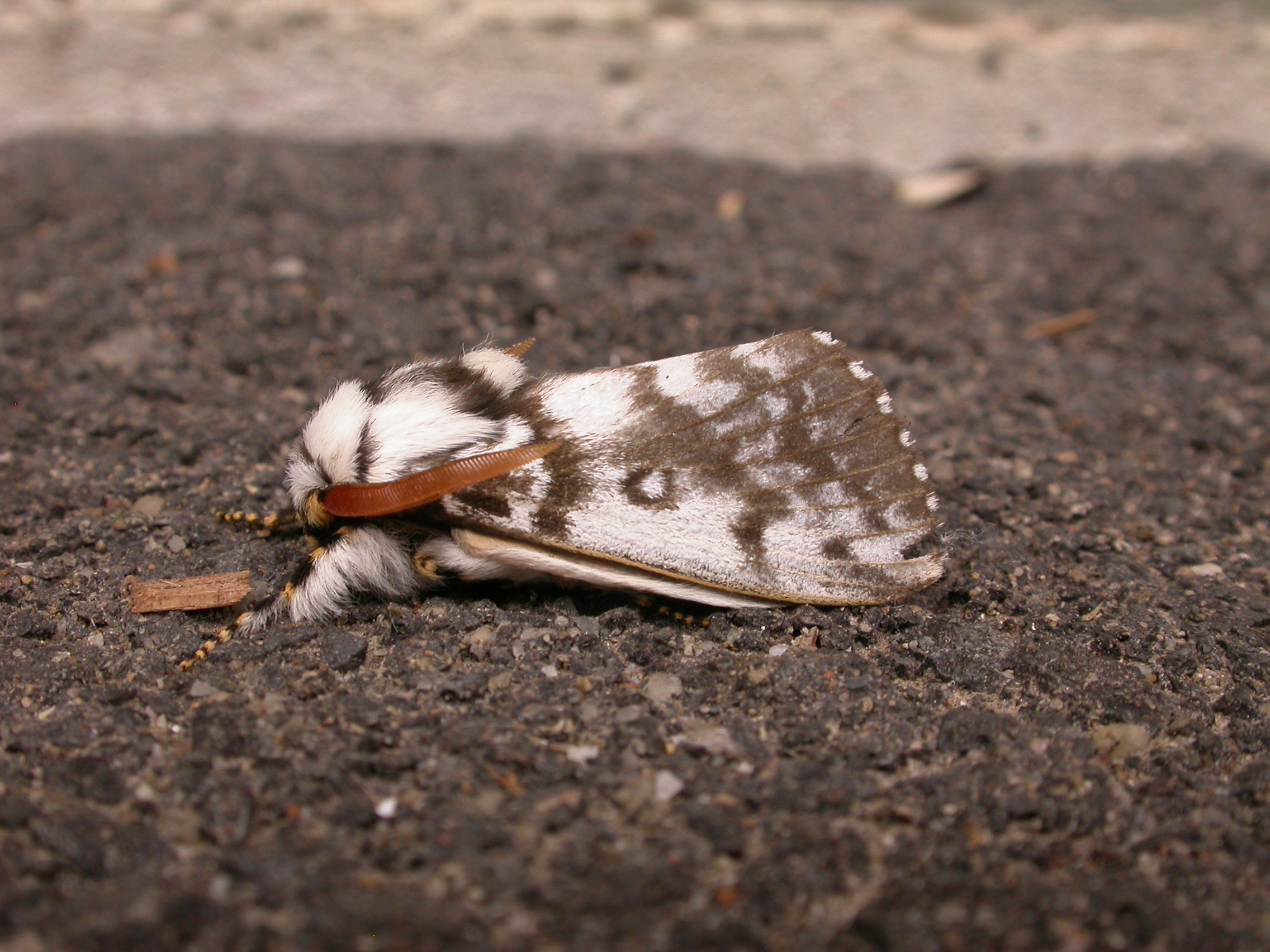

Scientific classification
- Kingdom: Animalia
- Phylum: Arthropoda
- Class: Insecta
- Order: Lepidoptera
- Family: Lasiocampidae
- Genus: Porela
- Species: P. vitulina

Binomial name
- Porela vitulina (Donovan, 1805)

Synonyms
- Phalaena vitulina Donovan, 1805

= Porela vitulina =

Species of moth

Porela vitulina is a moth of the family Lasiocampidae. It is known from Australia, including New South Wales, Queensland and Victoria.

The wingspan is about 40 mm for males and 60 mm for females.

The larvae have been recorded feeding on the foliage of various Casuarinaceae species.
