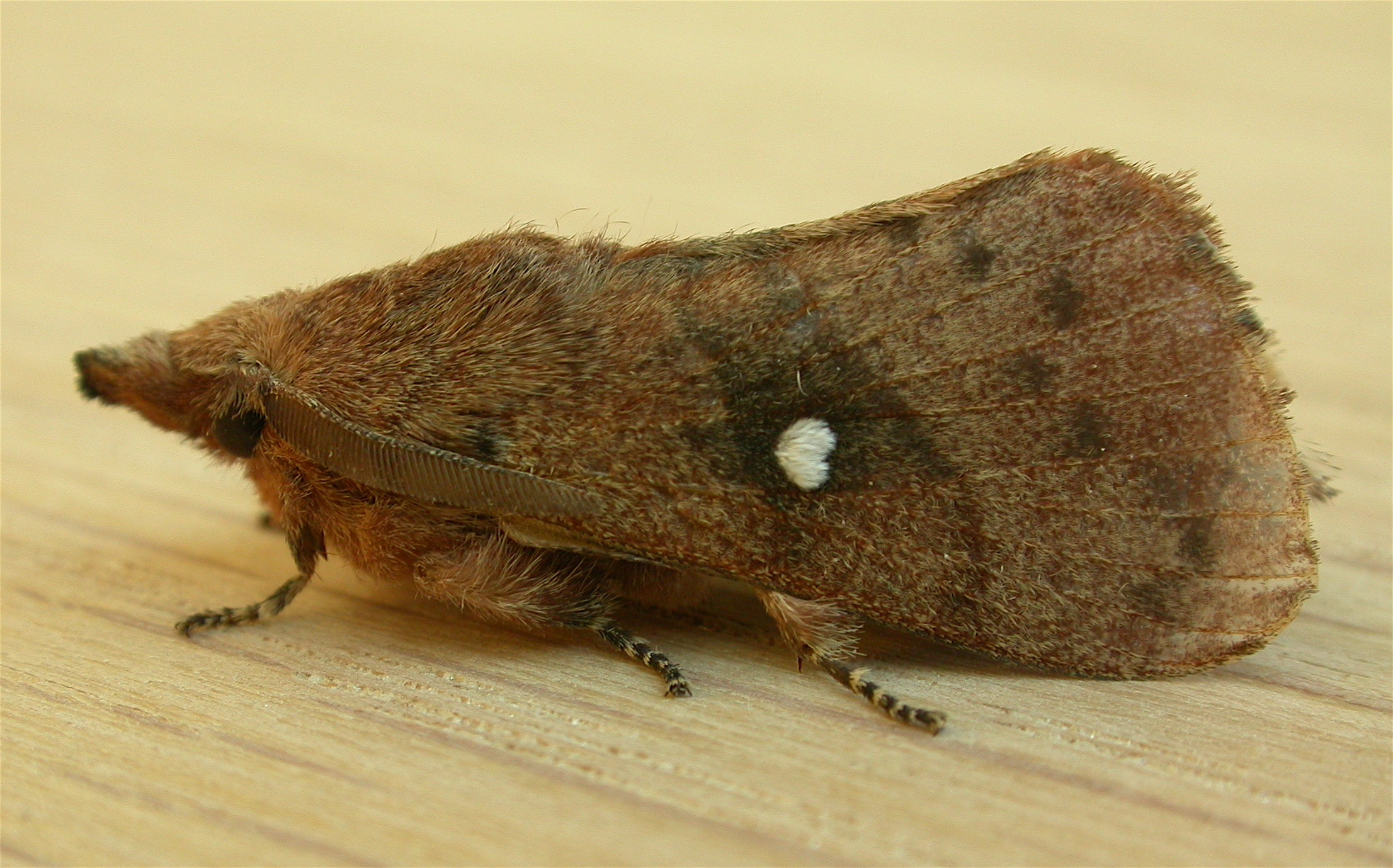

Scientific classification
- Domain: Eukaryota
- Kingdom: Animalia
- Phylum: Arthropoda
- Class: Insecta
- Order: Lepidoptera
- Family: Lasiocampidae
- Genus: Opsirhina
- Species: O. lechriodes

Binomial name
- Opsirhina lechriodes (Turner, 1911)

Synonyms
- Rhathymodes lechriodes Turner, 1911

= Opsirhina lechriodes =

Species of moth

Opsirhina lechriodes is a species of moth of the family Lasiocampidae. It is found in New South Wales and Victoria.

The wingspan is about 40 mm.

The larvae feed on Eucalyptus species.
