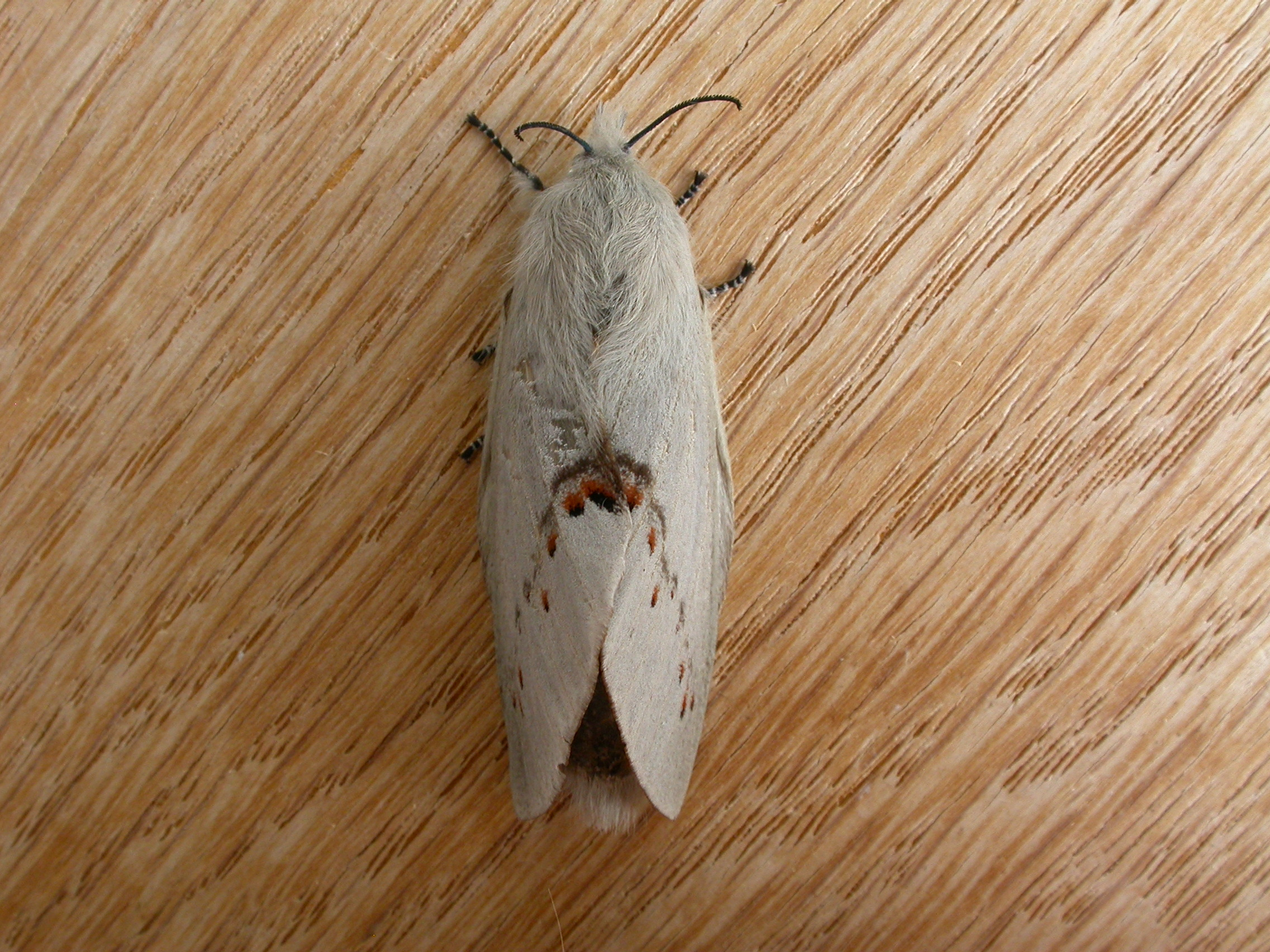
- Female
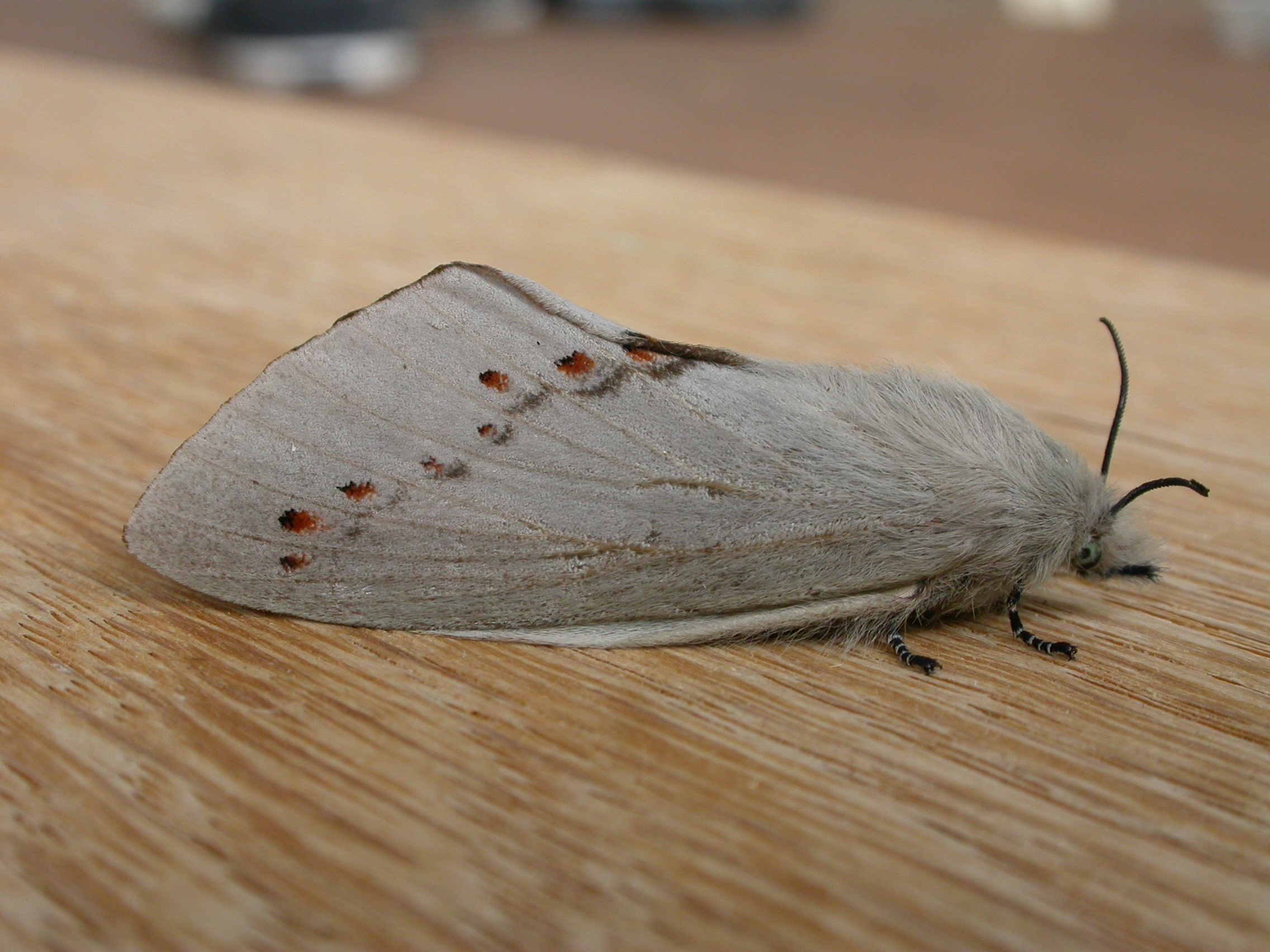
- Female

Scientific classification
- Kingdom: Animalia
- Phylum: Arthropoda
- Class: Insecta
- Order: Lepidoptera
- Family: Lasiocampidae
- Genus: Pinara
- Species: P. metaphaea

Binomial name
- Pinara metaphaea (Walker, 1862)

Synonyms
- Lebeda metaphaea Walker, 1862; Opsirhina metaphaea Walker, 1865; Entometa adusta Walker, 1869; Lebeda metaphora Conte, 1908; Pinara obscura Conte, 1908

= Pinara metaphaea =

Species of moth

Pinara metaphaea, the pinara moth, is a species of moth identified from the family Lasiocampidae. Francis Walker first described this organism in the year 1862. It is a species native from south-east Australia, including New South Wales and Victoria.

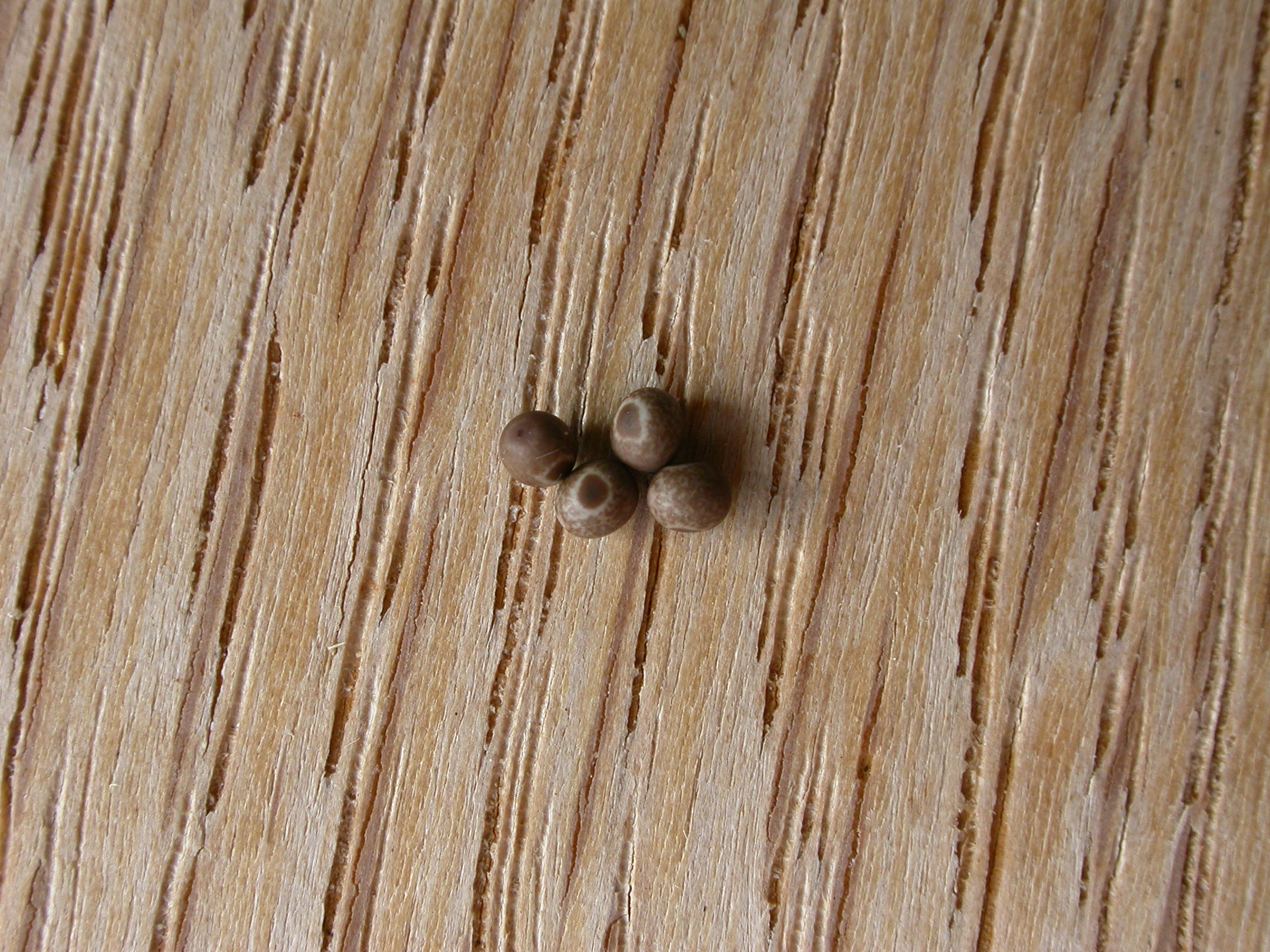
Eggs

Its wingspan is measured to be about 40 mm for males and about 60 mm for females.

Moreover, its larvae feed on the foliage of Eucalyptus species.
