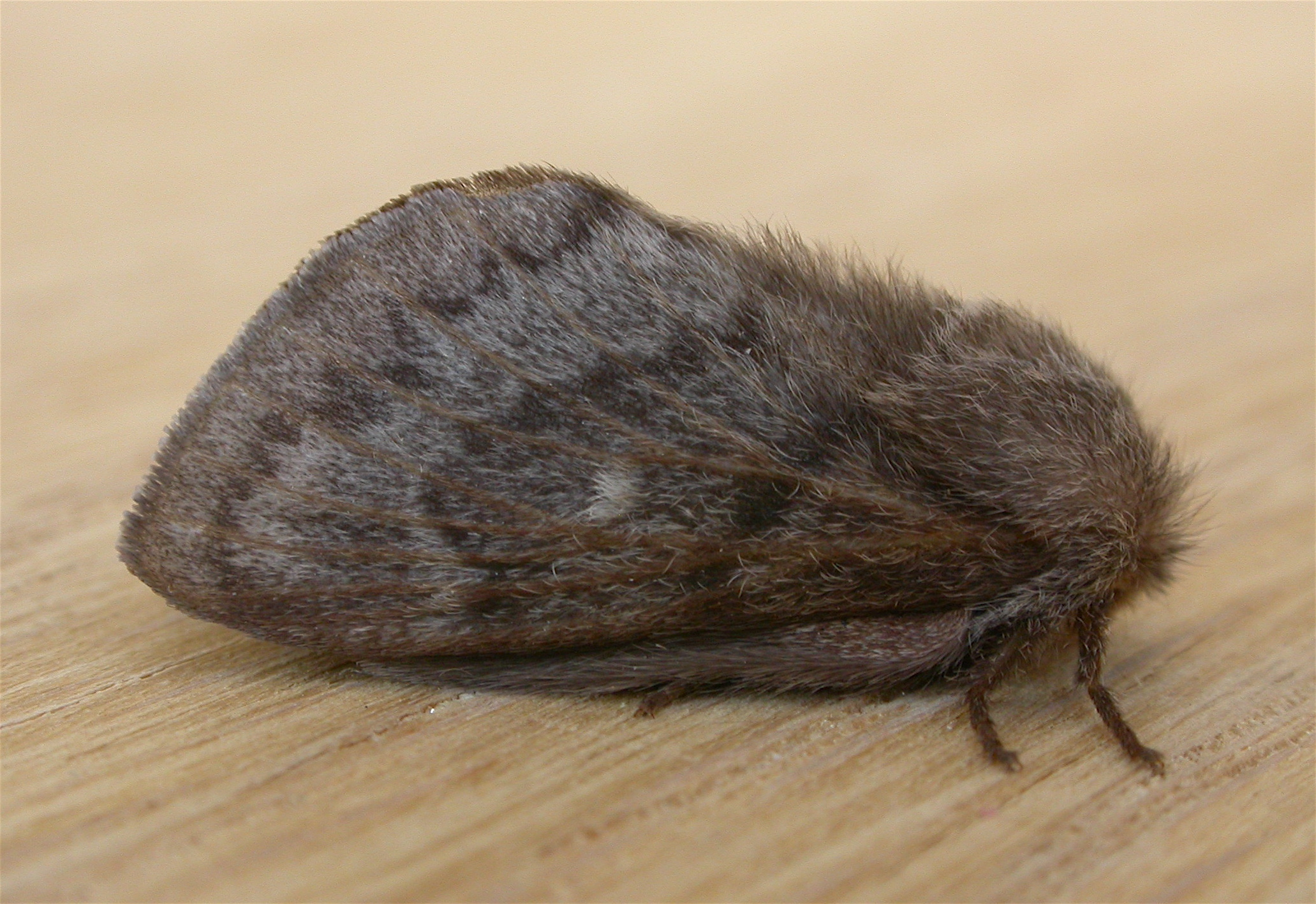

Scientific classification
- Kingdom: Animalia
- Phylum: Arthropoda
- Class: Insecta
- Order: Lepidoptera
- Family: Lasiocampidae
- Genus: Pernattia
- Species: P. pusilla

Binomial name
- Pernattia pusilla Donovan, 1805

Synonyms
- Perna exposita

= Pernattia pusilla =

Species of moth

Pernattia pusilla, the she-oak moth, is a species of moth of the family Lasiocampidae. It was described by Edward Donovan in 1805 and is found along the coast of eastern Australia.

The wingspan is about 30 mm.

The larvae feed on Allocasuarina litoralis, Allocasuarina verticillata, Casuarina cunninghamiana, Casuarina glauca and Casuarina equisetifolia.
