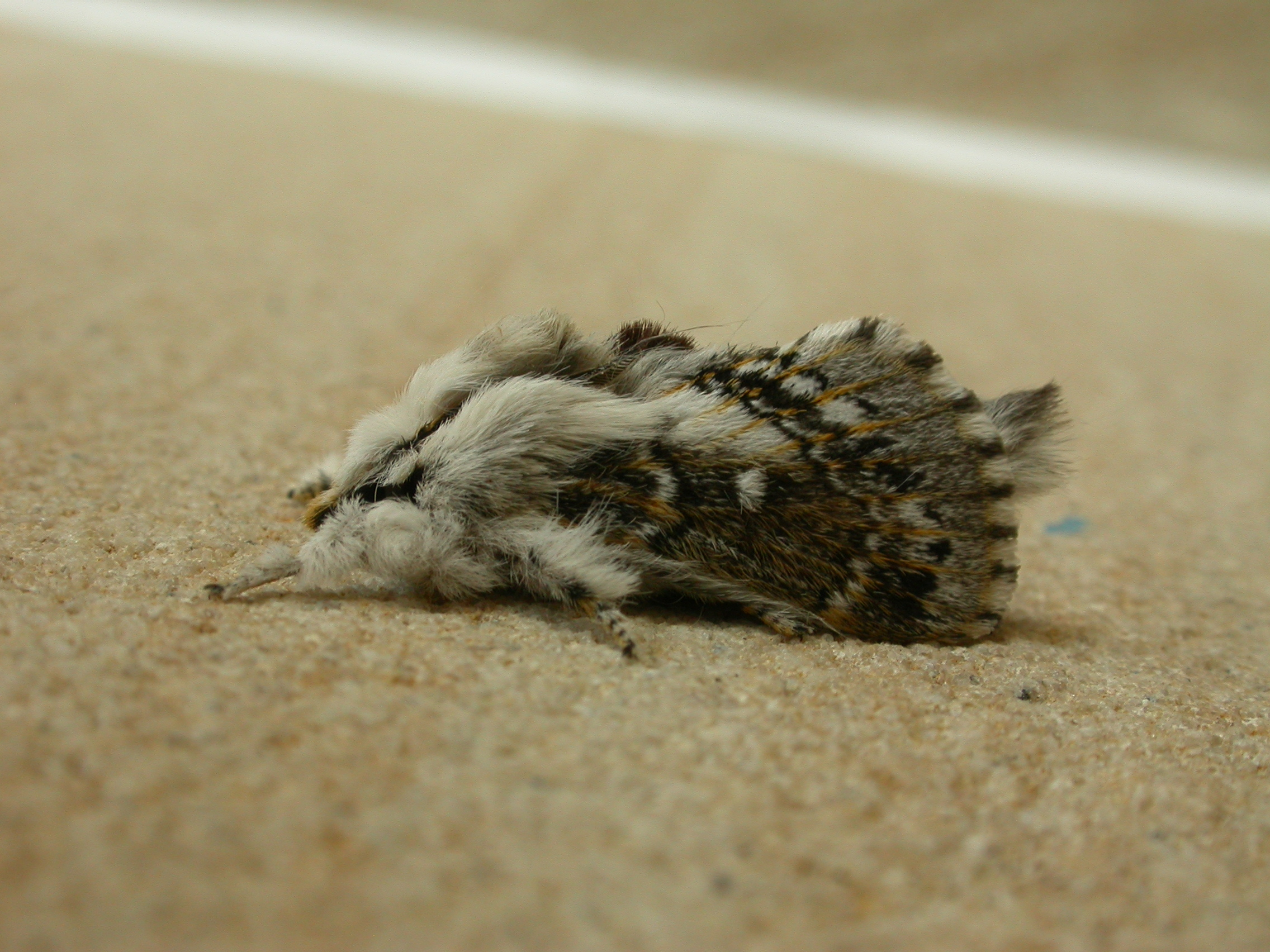

Scientific classification
- Kingdom: Animalia
- Phylum: Arthropoda
- Class: Insecta
- Order: Lepidoptera
- Family: Lasiocampidae
- Genus: Porela
- Species: P. delineata

Binomial name
- Porela delineata (Walker, 1855)

Synonyms
- Tacillia delineata Walker, 1855

= Porela delineata =

Species of moth

Porela delineata is a moth of the family Lasiocampidae. It is known from Australia, including New South Wales, Queensland and Victoria.

The wingspan is about 30 mm.
