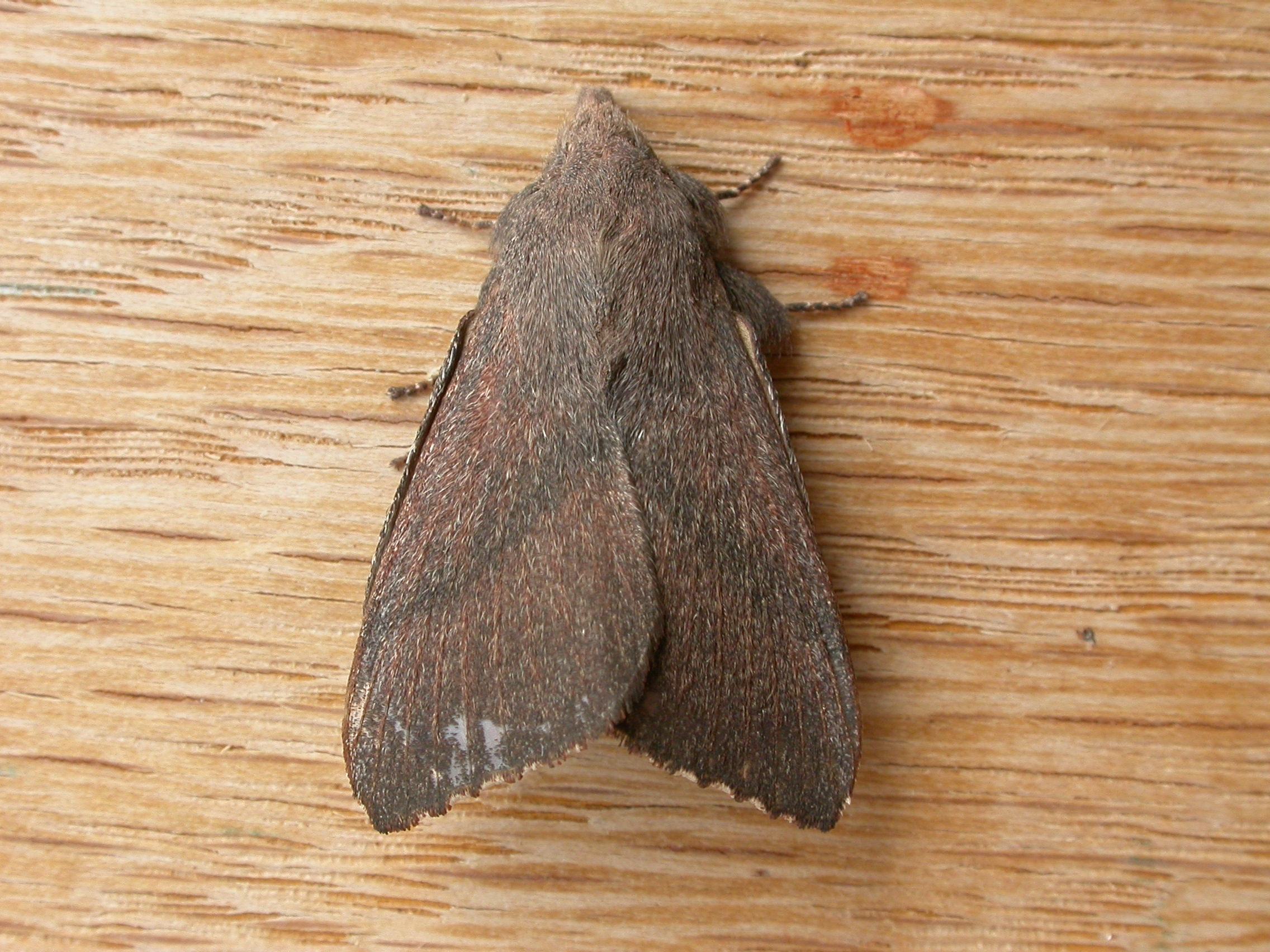
- Male

Scientific classification
- Kingdom: Animalia
- Phylum: Arthropoda
- Class: Insecta
- Order: Lepidoptera
- Family: Lasiocampidae
- Genus: Pararguda
- Species: P. rufescens

Binomial name
- Pararguda rufescens (Walker, 1855)

Synonyms
- Gastropacha rufescens Walker, 1855; Megasoma rubida Walker, 1865

= Pararguda rufescens =

Species of moth

Pararguda rufescens is a moth of the family Lasiocampidae. It is known from Australia, including New South Wales, Queensland, South Australia, Tasmania, Victoria and Western Australia.

The wingspan is about 40 mm for males and 50 mm for females.

The larvae feed on Eucalyptus cneorifolia. They are fawn and furry.
