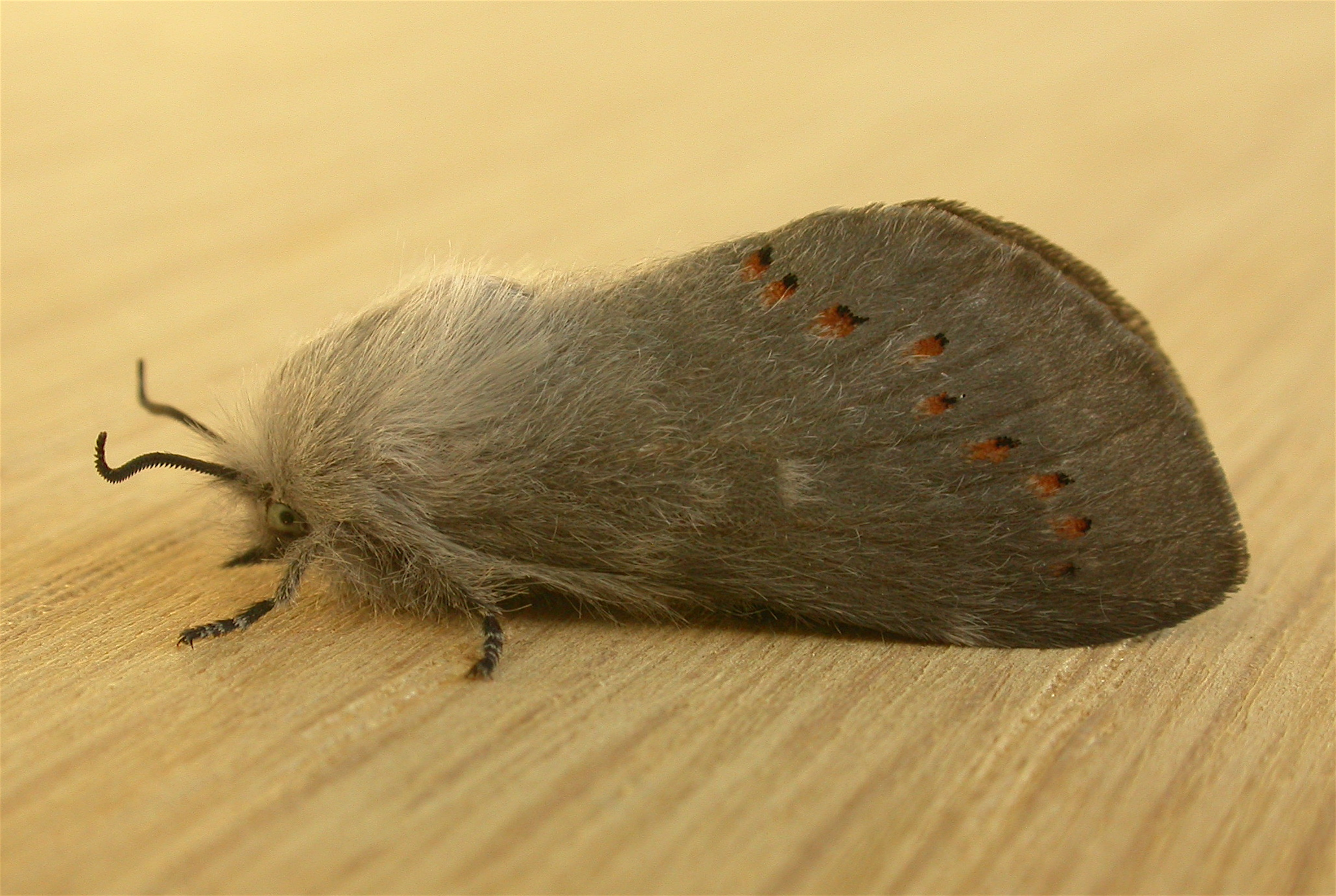

Scientific classification
- Kingdom: Animalia
- Phylum: Arthropoda
- Class: Insecta
- Order: Lepidoptera
- Family: Lasiocampidae
- Genus: Pinara
- Species: P. divisa

Binomial name
- Pinara divisa Walker, 1855

Synonyms
- Rhinogyne australasiae

= Pinara divisa =

Species of moth

Pinara divisa, the common pinara, is a species of moth of the family Lasiocampidae. It was first described by Francis Walker in 1855. It is found in the south-east quarter of Australia.

The wingspan is about 40 mm.

The larvae feed on eucalyptus species.
