= Divisa =

Divisa may refer to:

- Divisa, Panama, a town in Azuero Peninsula
- Divisa Alegre, a Brazilian municipality located in the northeast of the state of Minas Gerais
- Divisa Nova, a Brazilian municipality in the state of Minas Gerais
- Da Divisa River, a river of Santa Catarina state in southeastern Brazil
- Salto da Divisa, a Brazilian municipality in the northeast of the state of Minas Gerais
