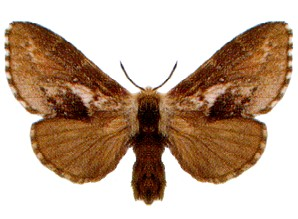

Scientific classification
- Kingdom: Animalia
- Phylum: Arthropoda
- Class: Insecta
- Order: Lepidoptera
- Family: Lasiocampidae
- Genus: Porela
- Species: P. vetusta

Binomial name
- Porela vetusta (Walker, 1855)

Synonyms
- Perna varia Walker, 1855; Mecytha antiqua Walker, 1869; Clathe anthracica Turner, 1902

= Porela vetusta =

Species of moth

Porela vetusta, the ancient porela, is a moth of the family Lasiocampidae. It was first described by Francis Walker in 1855. It is found in the Australian states of New South Wales, Queensland, Tasmania and Victoria.

The wingspan is about 25 mm for males and 35 mm for females.

The larvae feed on Eucalyptus and Leptospermum species.
