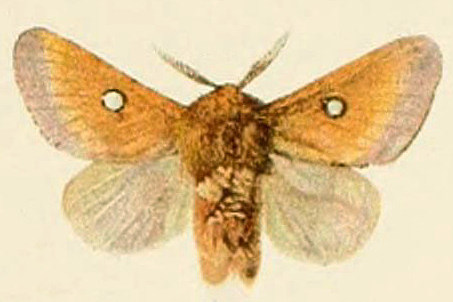

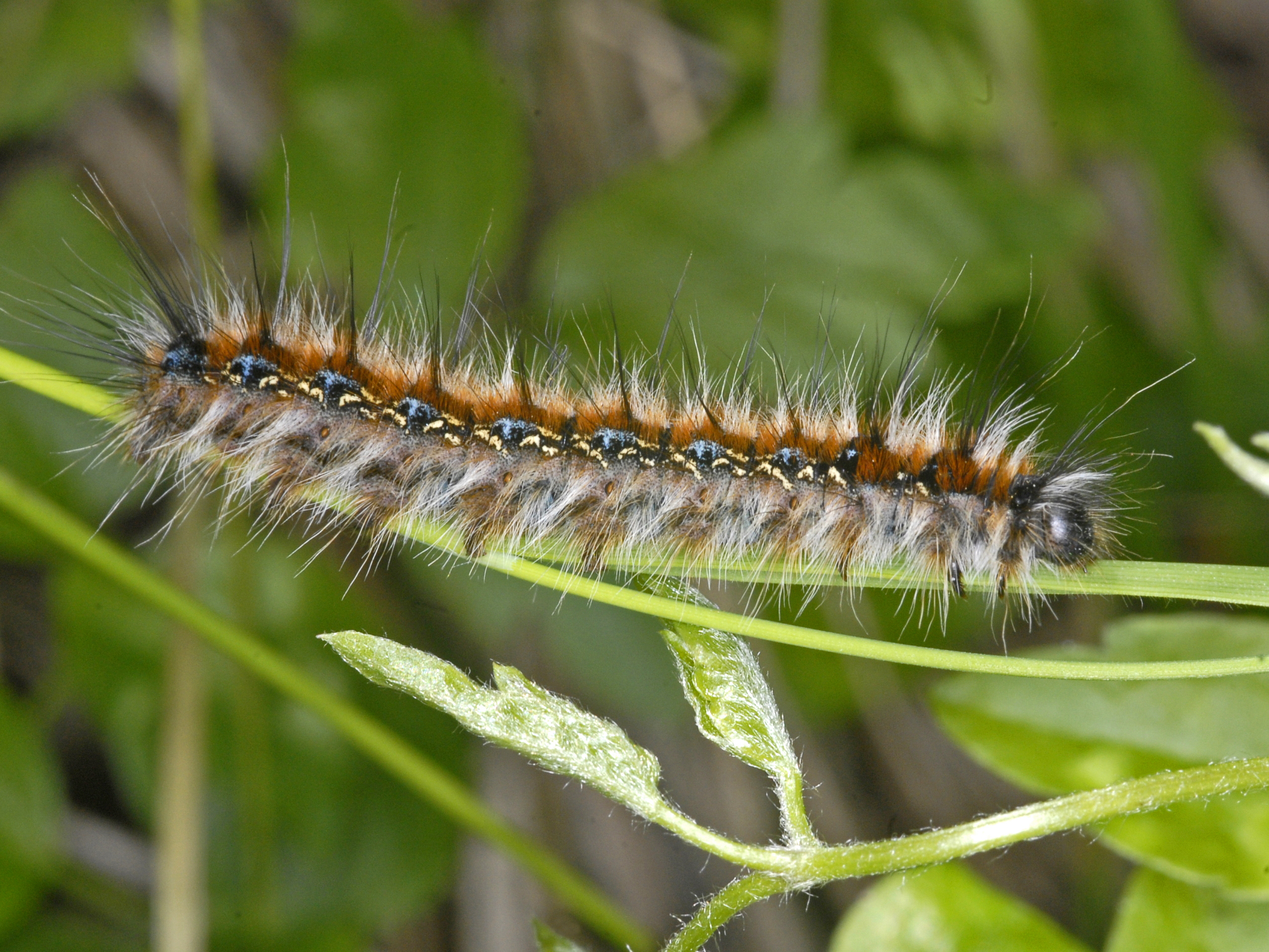
- Adult (top) and larva (bottom)

Conservation status
- Data Deficient (IUCN 2.3)

Scientific classification
- Kingdom: Animalia
- Phylum: Arthropoda
- Class: Insecta
- Order: Lepidoptera
- Family: Lasiocampidae
- Genus: Eriogaster
- Species: E. catax

Binomial name
- Eriogaster catax (Linnaeus, 1758)

= Eriogaster catax =

Species of moth

Eriogaster catax, commonly known as the eastern eggar, is a species of moth in the family Lasiocampidae.

== Description ==
Eriogaster catax has a wingspan of 27–35 millimetres (1.1–1.4 in) in males, of 35–45 millimetres (1.4–1.8 in) in the females. This species shows a pronounced sexual dimorphism. The males are smaller and have feathery antennae. In males the basal part of the front wing is yellow-orange, while the outer part is pinkish-brown. In the females the front wings are browner. In both sexes, the front wings show a transversal line and a white discal spot within a dark border. Hind wings have no markings. Females are larger and at the end of the abdomen they have a tuft of dense gray-black hairs.

The eggs hatch in April. The larvae feed on Crataegus, Quercus, Betula, Populus, Prunus and Berberis species. This univoltine species fly at night in September and October.

== Distribution ==
It is found in Austria, Belgium, Bulgaria, Czech Republic, Germany, Hungary, Italy, the Netherlands, Poland, Serbia and Montenegro, Slovakia, and Spain.
