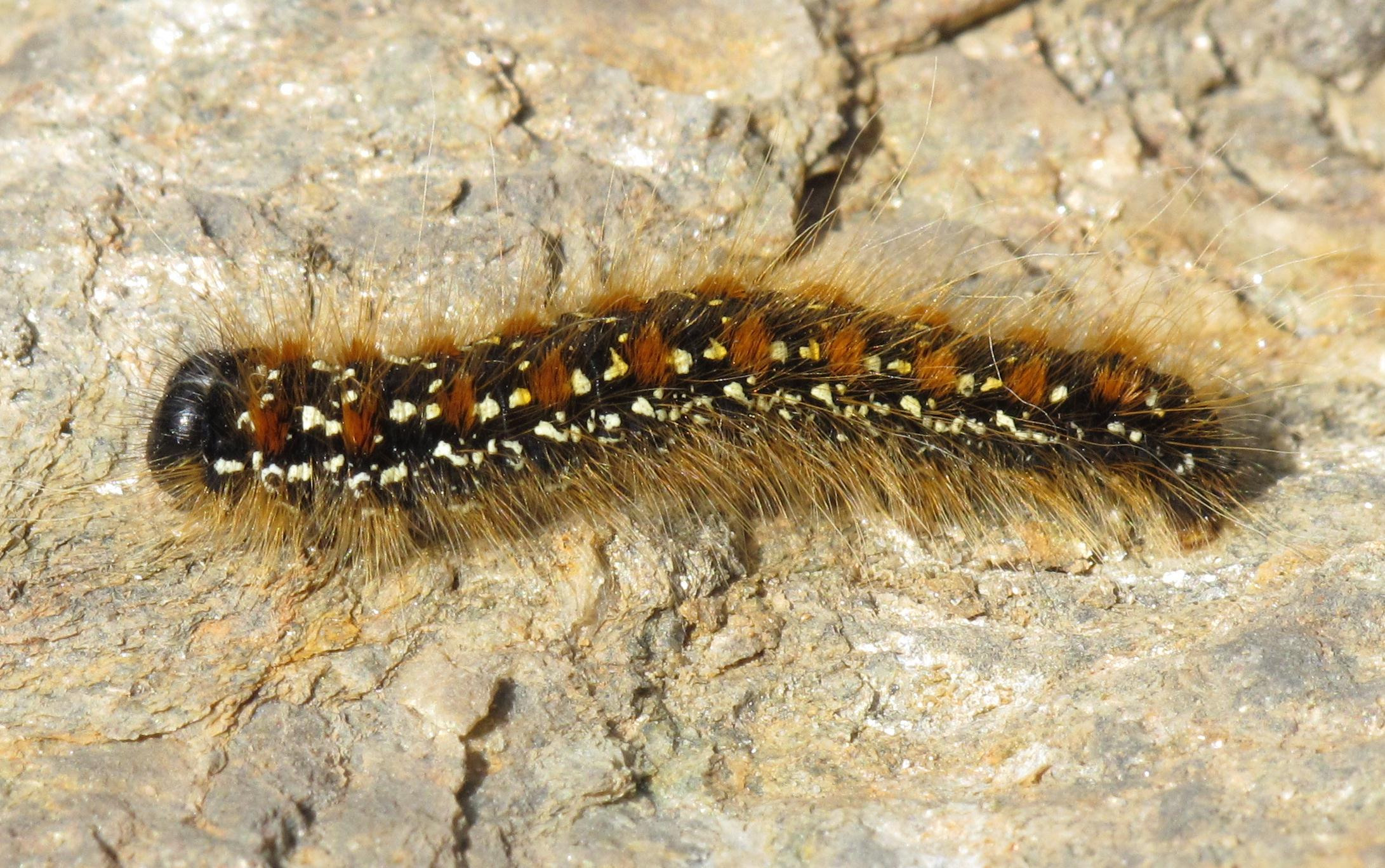
- Larva
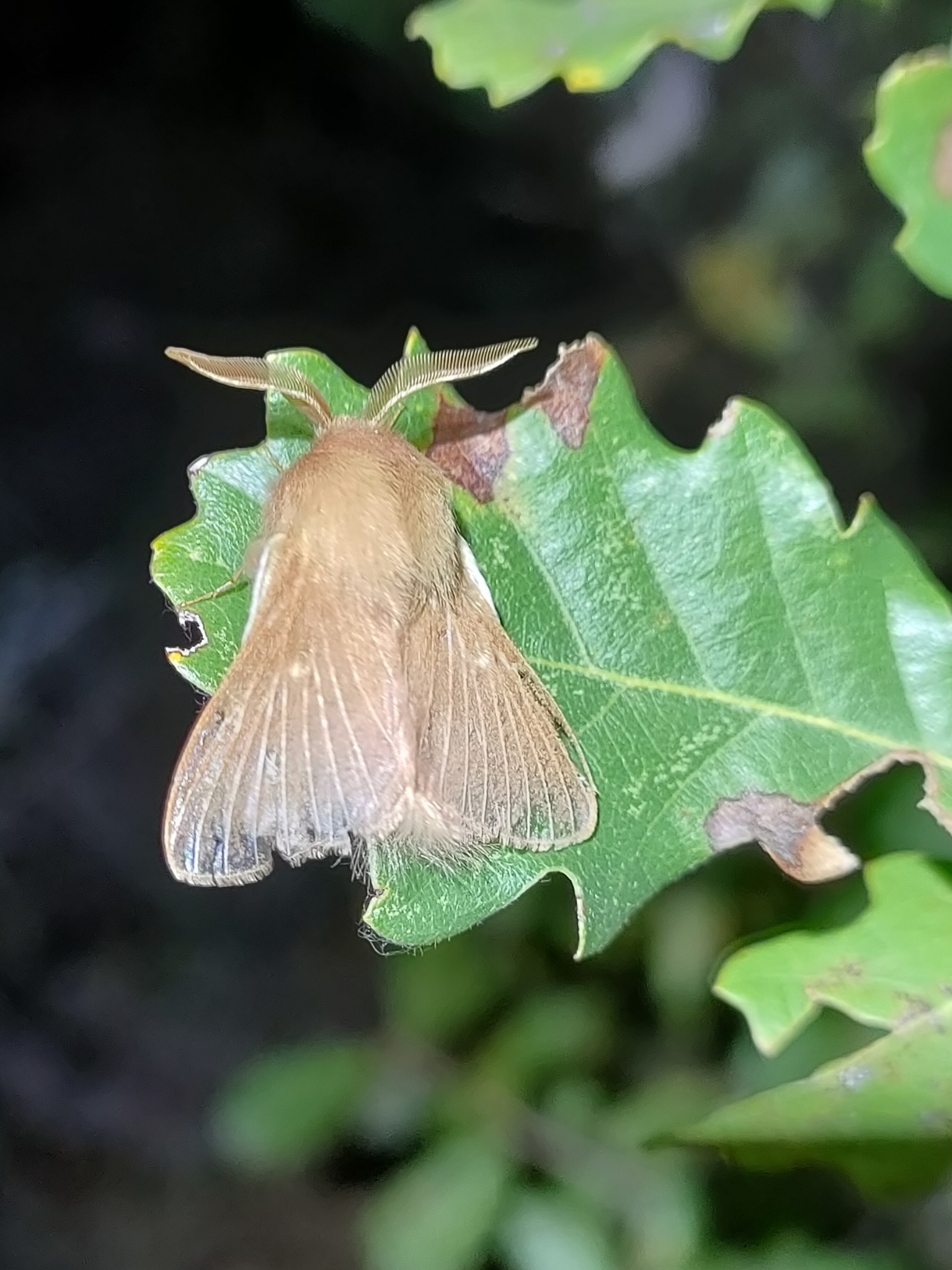
- Adult

Scientific classification
- Kingdom: Animalia
- Phylum: Arthropoda
- Class: Insecta
- Order: Lepidoptera
- Family: Lasiocampidae
- Genus: Eriogaster
- Species: E. arbusculae

Binomial name
- Eriogaster arbusculae Freyer, 1849

= Eriogaster arbusculae =

Species of moth

Eriogaster arbusculae is a moth in the family Lasiocampidae first described by Christian Friedrich Freyer in 1849. It is found in parts of the Alps and mountainous areas of Fennoscandia.

The wingspan for adults is 31–35 mm for males and 36–43 mm for females. There is one generation per year with adults on wing from April to July.

The larvae feed on the leaves of Vaccinium myrtillus, Vaccinium uliginosum, Betula, Salix and Alnus species.

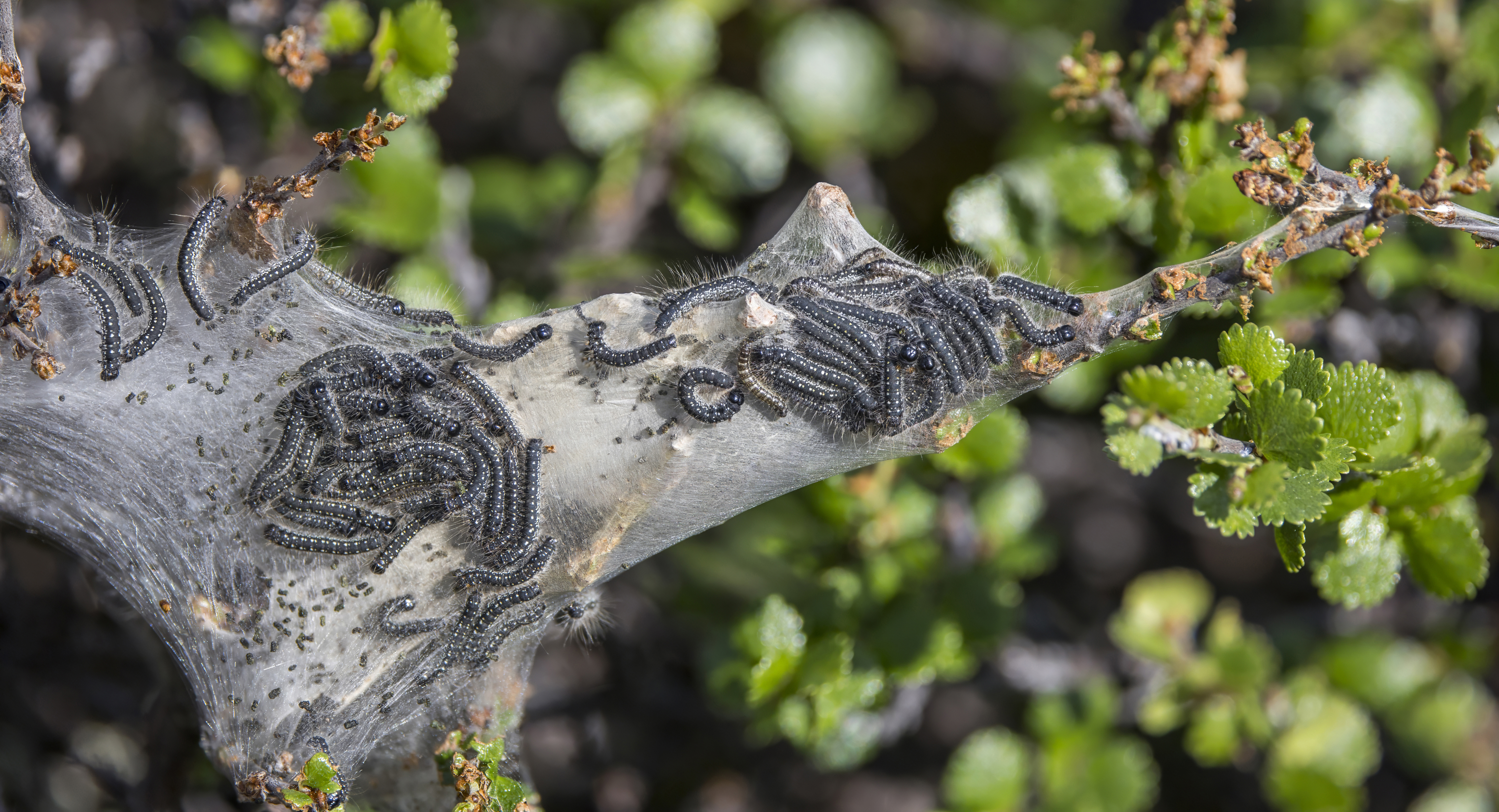
caterpillars in a silk "tent" Dovrefjell National Park, Norway
