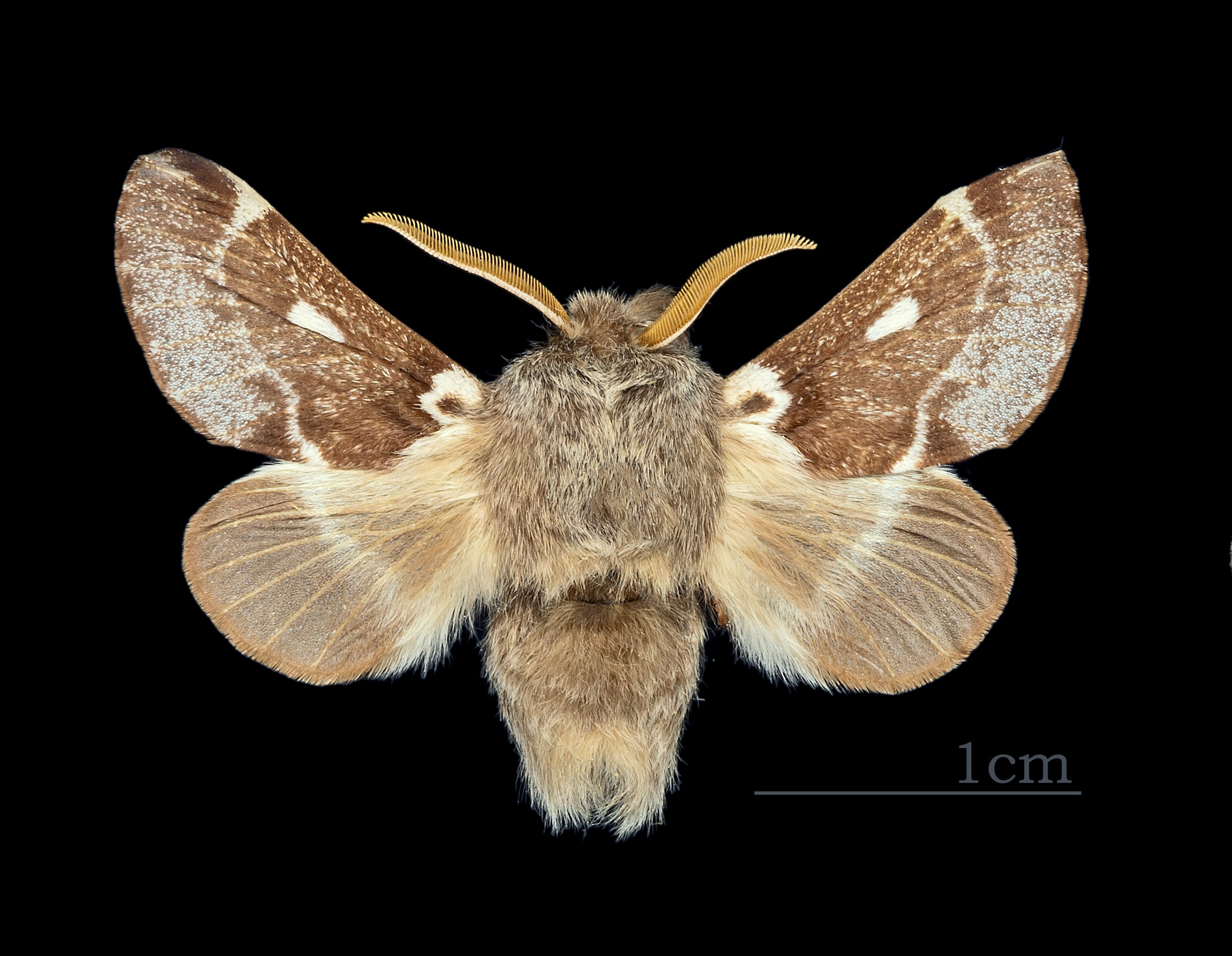
- Eriogaster lanestris

Scientific classification
- Domain: Eukaryota
- Kingdom: Animalia
- Phylum: Arthropoda
- Class: Insecta
- Order: Lepidoptera
- Family: Lasiocampidae
- Genus: Eriogaster; Germar, 1810

Synonyms
- Lachneis Hübner, 1806 (Unav.); Dasysoma Hübner, 1820; Gastris Billberg, 1820; Lachneis Hübner, 1822; Dasyoma Walker, 1855 (Missp.)

= Eriogaster =

Genus of moths

Eriogaster is a genus of moths in the family Lasiocampidae first described by Ernst Friedrich Germar in 1810.

== Species ==
- Eriogaster acanthophylli Christoph, 1882
- Eriogaster arbusculae Freyer, 1849
- Eriogaster catax (Linnaeus, 1758)
- Eriogaster czipkai Lajonquiére, 1975
- Eriogaster daralagesia Zolotuhin, 1991
- Eriogaster henkei Staudinger, 1879
- Eriogaster lanestris (Linnaeus, 1758) - small eggar
- Eriogaster neogena Fischer von Waldheim, 1824
- Eriogaster nippei de Freina, 1988
- Eriogaster pfeifferi Daniel, 1932
- Eriogaster reshoefti Schulte & Witt, 1975
- Eriogaster rimicola (Denis & Schiffermüller, 1775)
