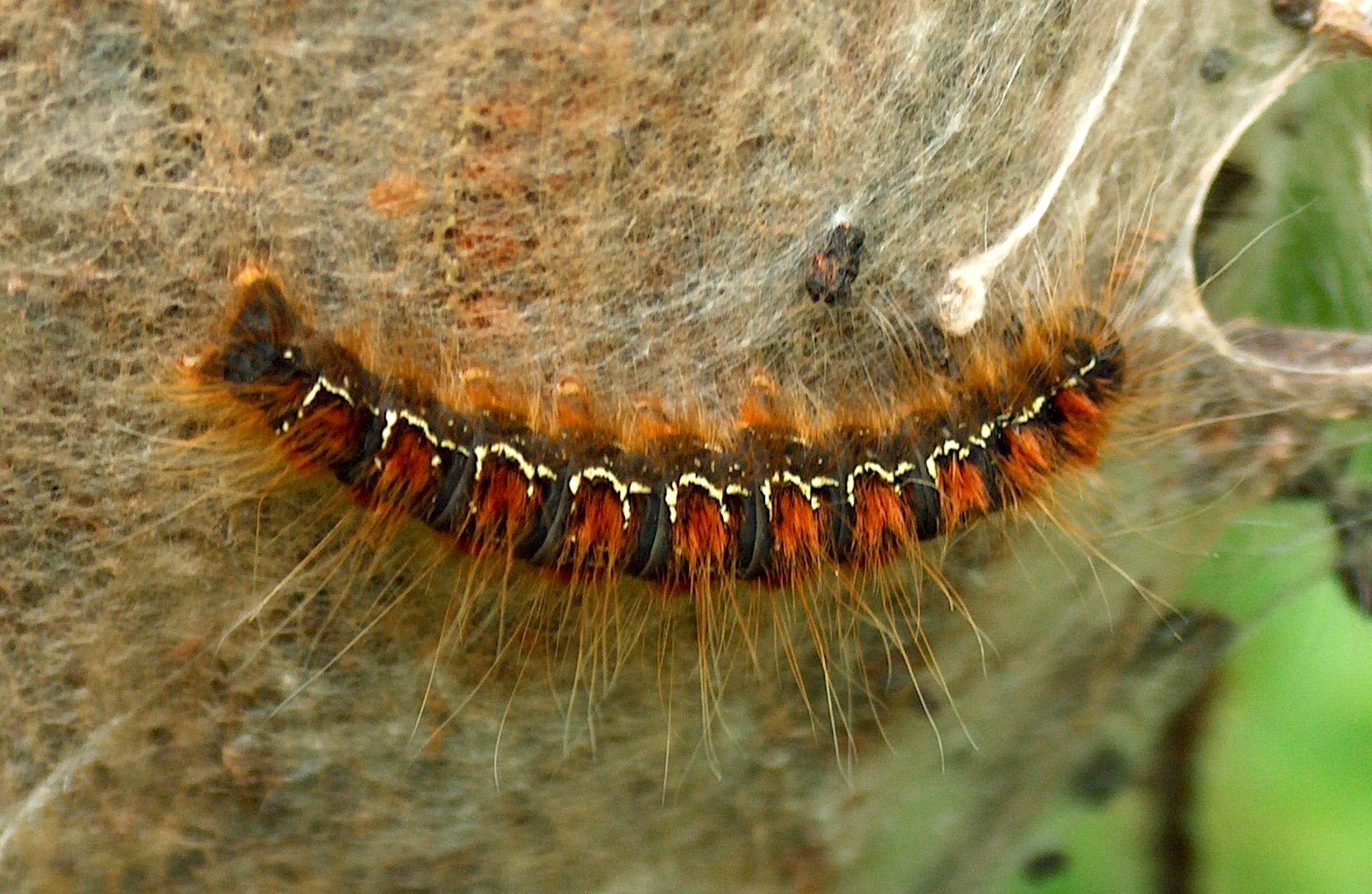
- Larva
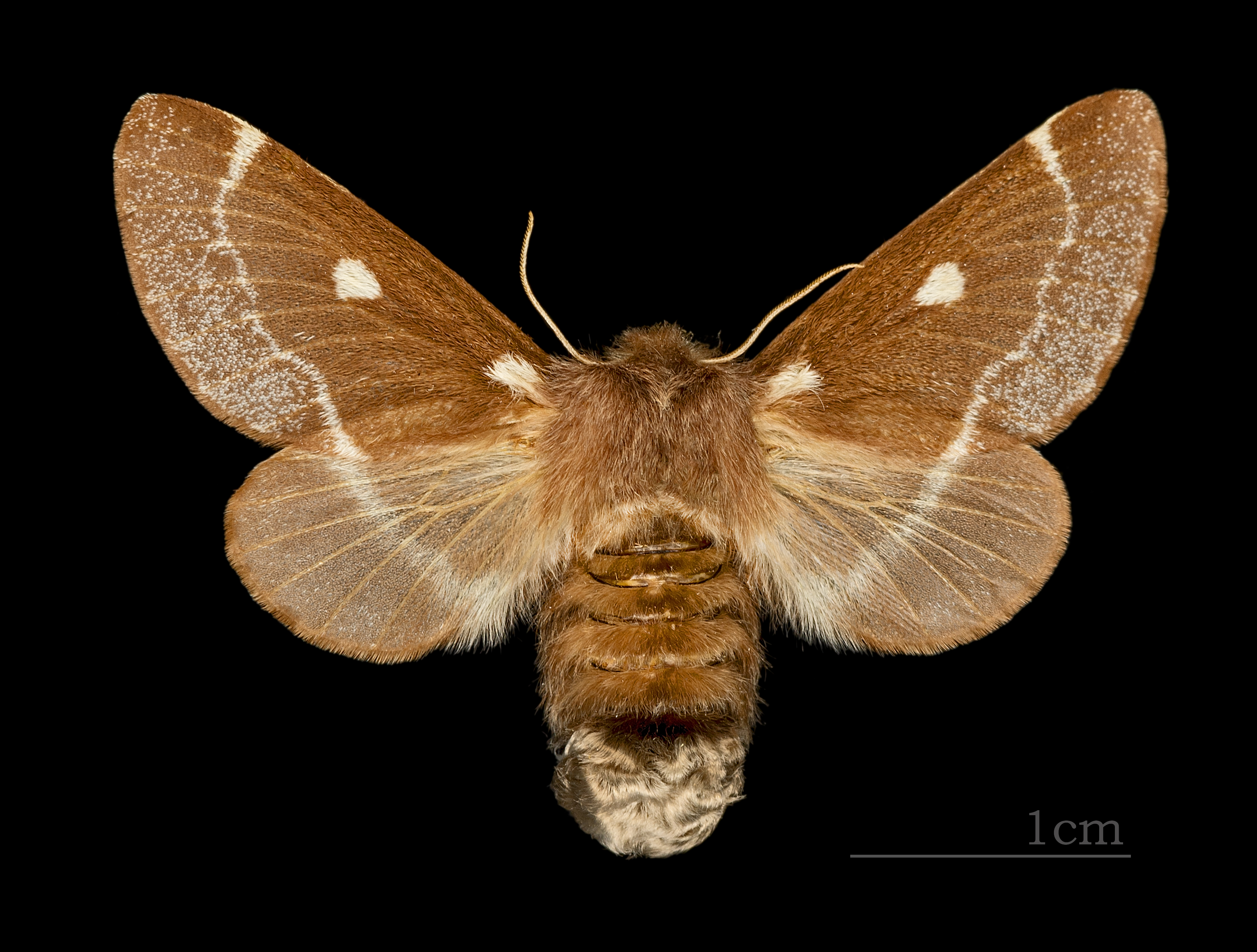

Scientific classification
- Kingdom: Animalia
- Phylum: Arthropoda
- Clade: Pancrustacea
- Class: Insecta
- Order: Lepidoptera
- Family: Lasiocampidae
- Genus: Eriogaster
- Species: E. lanestris

Binomial name
- Eriogaster lanestris (Linnaeus, 1758)

= Eriogaster lanestris =

Small eggar

Species of moth

Eriogaster lanestris, commonly known as the small eggar, is a moth of the family Lasiocampidae that is found across the Palearctic. Unlike many other members of the Lasiocampidae, the small eggar is a social insect. Historically, only eusocial insects like ants, bees, and termites were thought to exhibit complex social organization and communication systems. However, research since the late 20th century has found that E. lanestris, among a number of other phylogenetically related moth and butterfly species, demonstrates social behaviors as well. Larvae spend nearly their entire development in colonies of about 200 individuals, and this grouped social structure offers a number of benefits, from thermoregulation to increased foraging success.

The small eggar population has been in decline since the 1970s. Landscaping practices like hedgerow cutting and intensive mowing destroy habitats and damage cocoons during pupation, leading to scattered populations and increased rarity.

== Description ==
Small eggar moths have a wingspan of 30–40 millimeters, and females are generally larger than males. Male and female adults have a gray-brown to reddish coloration with white spotting on their upper wings, however males tend to have darker, grayer coloration than females. Additionally, males antennae are bipectinate, or feather-like. Both sexes have setae on their bodies, but females have an extra grayish tuft of hair at the base of their abdominal region. Larvae are black and hairy, developing red coloration during the later larval stages. They can reach lengths of approximately 50 mm and often have yellow coloration along the sides of their bodies throughout development.

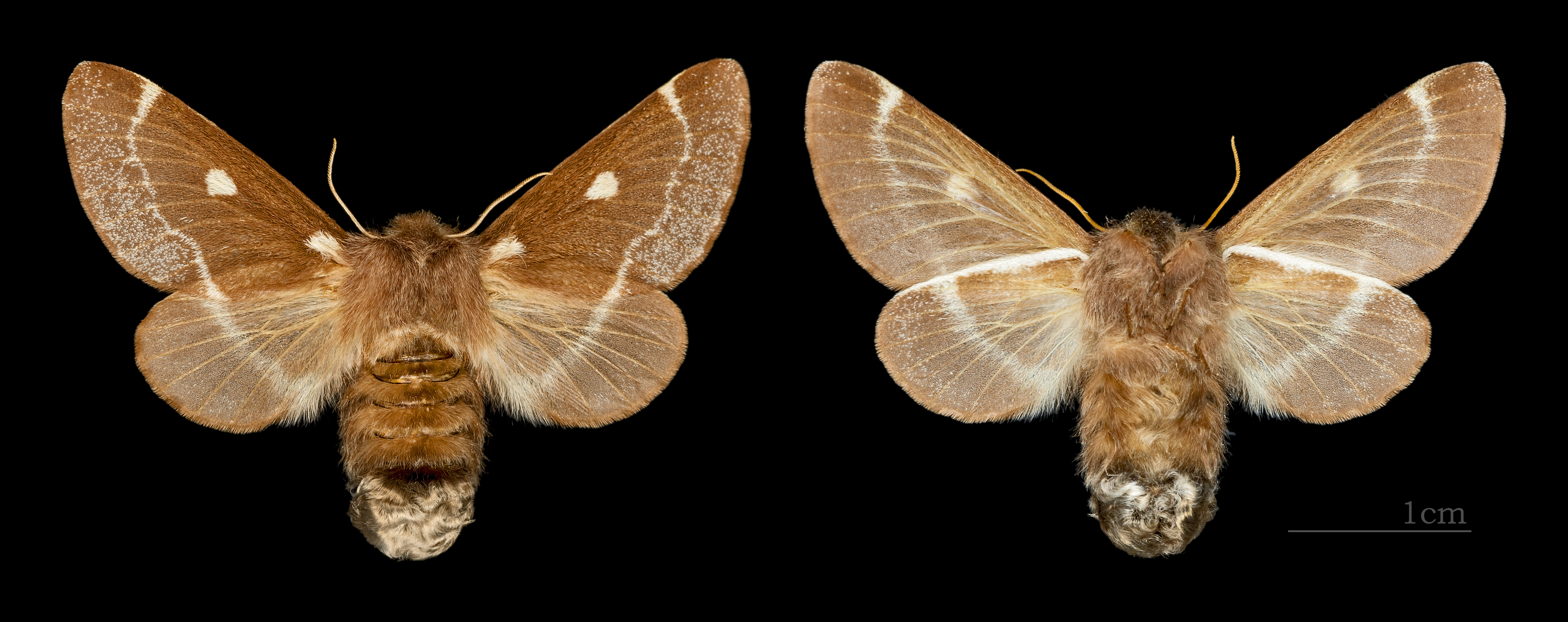
Adult female

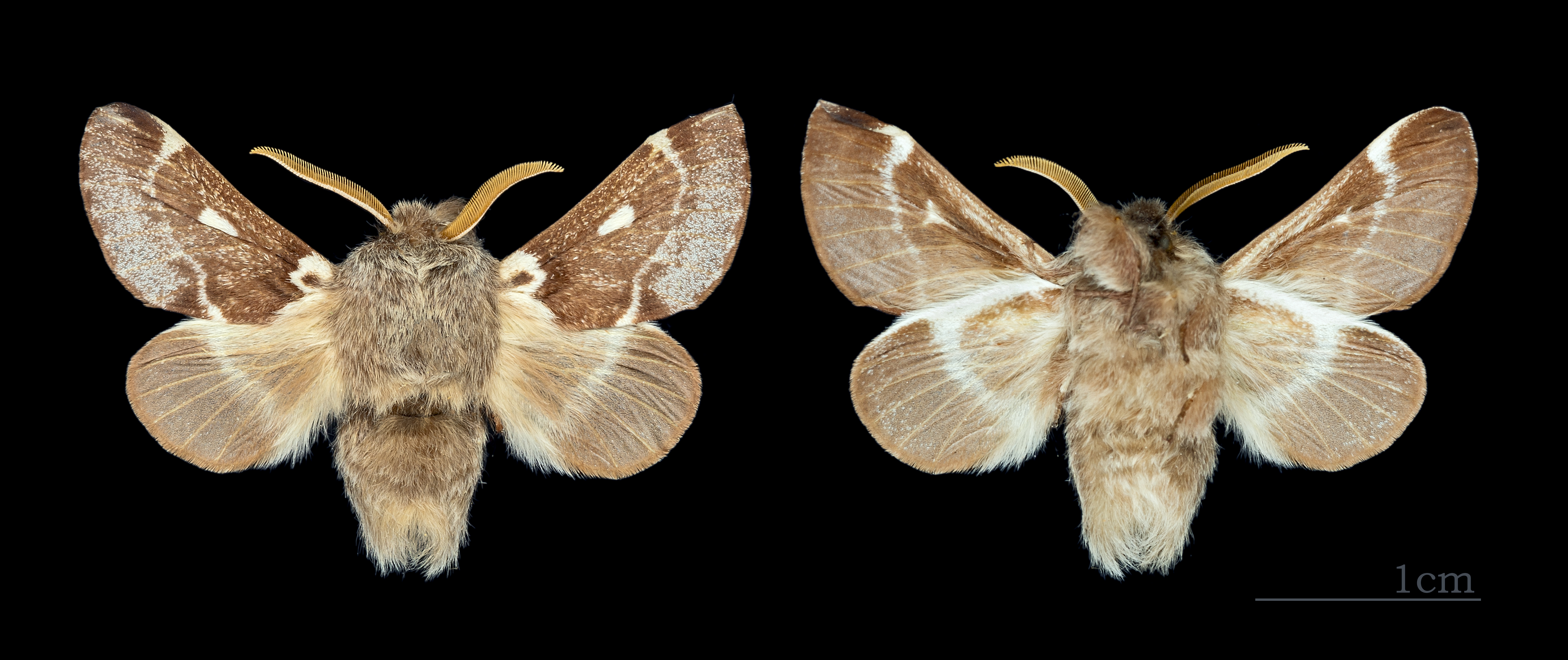
Adult male

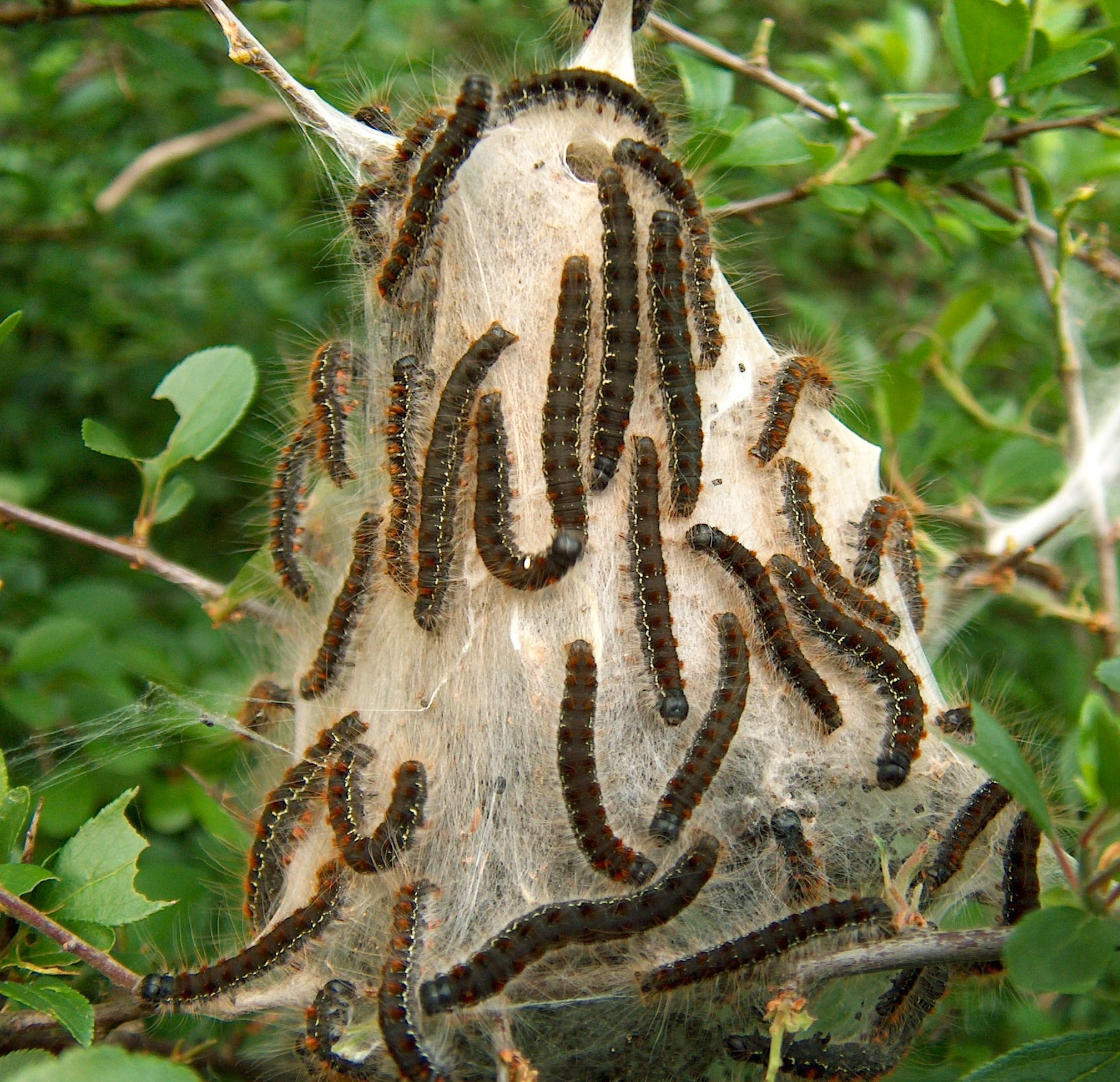
Larvae

== Geographic range ==
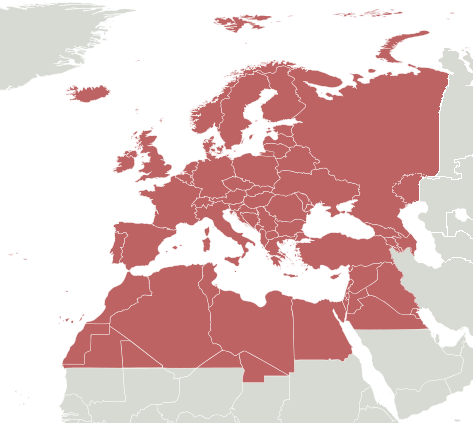
Western palearctic region

E. lanestris is found in scattered, patchy populations across the palearctic region, with most of its documentation in England, Ireland, and Wales. Due to its preference for warm, dry weather, the small eggar has a more limited range, as it cannot function properly in the cold conditions found in the northern palearctic. The moth is only active from spring to mid-summer in the temperate region of the U.K. and Ireland.

== Habitat ==
Larval colonies, egg masses, and cocoons are all found on small trees, bushes, and hedgerows. Host plants of the small eggar include blackthorn (Prunus spinosa), hawthorn (Cretaegus), and birch (Betula pendula). E. lanestris prefers these plants due to their branching and twigging structure suitable for oviposition and larval tent construction (see below), along with the food resources they offer. These species are commonly planted in hedge formations along roads, or around residential or agricultural land.

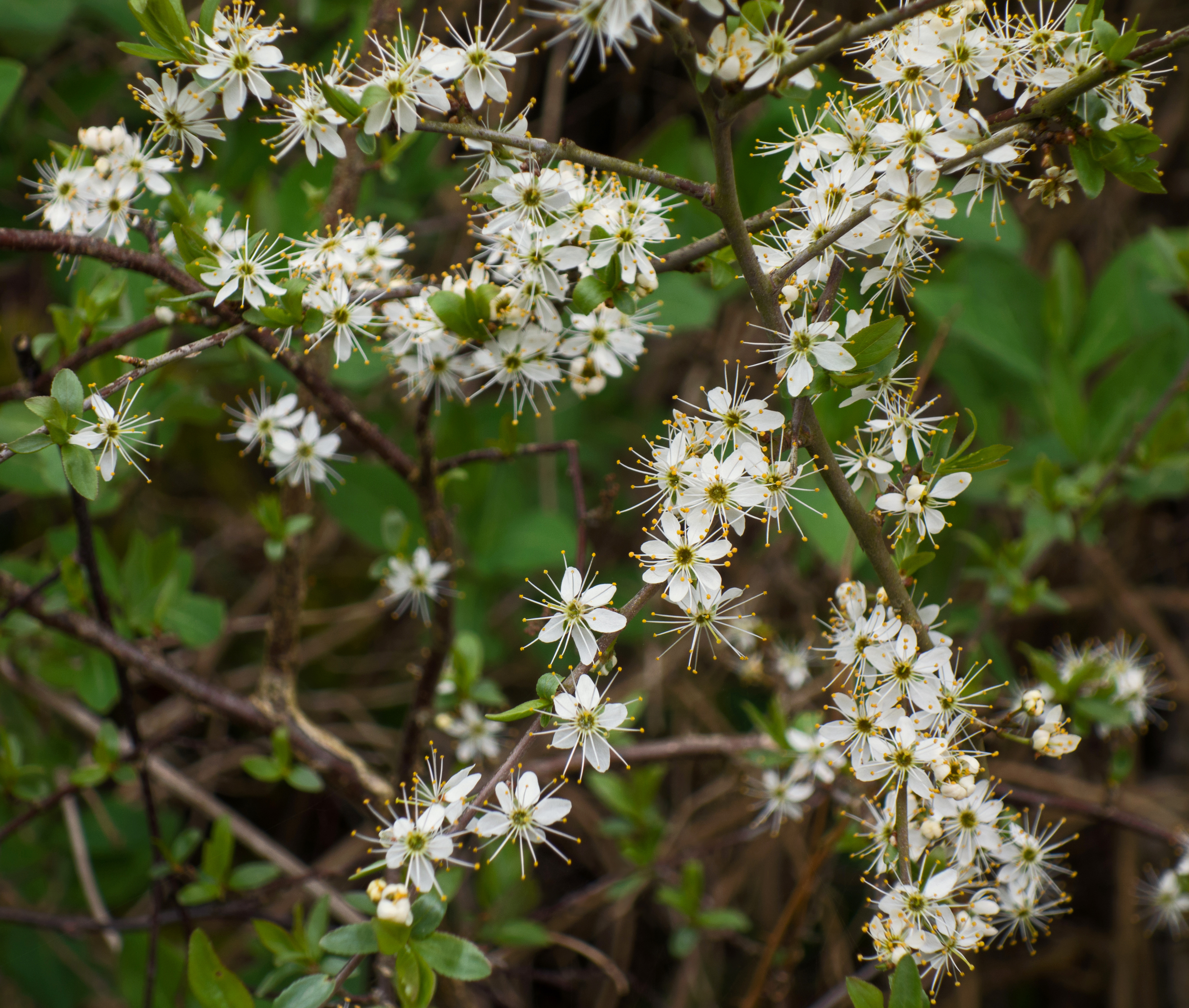
Prunus spinosa (blackthorn)

== Food resources ==
The small eggar only feeds during its larval stages of development, consuming leaves of blackthorn, hawthorn, and birch. Due to their high water and nitrogen content, young leaves, rather than more mature ones, are preferred by caterpillars. Caterpillars hatch around the time of leaf emergence in order to maximize feeding while leaves are still young and nutritious. The small eggar is a central-place forager, meaning it returns to the same nesting site after each foraging trip. This allows colonies of larval E. lanestris to communicate where the best feeding sites are located. However, as colonies develop, the closest food resources become too mature or are depleted, so caterpillars must venture further and further from their central site to feed.

== Social behavior ==
E. lanestris is a highly social insect, particularly during its larval stages. Hence, small eggar larvae are categorized as gregarious caterpillars. Living in large groups may make larval colonies more apparent to visually-oriented predators, however this social structure has also allowed the small eggar to evolve a number of advantageous behaviors.

=== Synchronous foraging ===
One benefit of the grouping behavior found in E. lanestris is increased foraging efficiency, which they achieve by foraging together in a large group. Colonies of caterpillars feed several times a day, leaving their tent as a group in search of food. The exact mechanism by which larvae determine feeding times is unknown, but it likely has to do with the ability of the silk tent to transmit vibrations throughout the structure. As caterpillars mobilize to leave the tent, others are alerted by the vibrations that it is time to feed, facilitating the movement of the entire colony, allowing for synchronous foraging. Unlike many nocturnal foragers, E. lanestris feeds both during the day and at night, so it runs the risk of detection by visually-oriented predators during daytime foraging forays. However, by leaving the security of the tent en masse instead of solitarily, caterpillars are able to minimize their individual risk of predation and cooperate to locate and reach the best feeding sites.

=== Trail-based communication ===
E. lanestris' central-place foraging strategy in which they leave and return to the same site during each foraging outing, allows caterpillars to communicate about the best nearby food sources, turning their nest into an information center. Caterpillars lay down a silk trail when they move outside of the tent, creating a network of trails that lead back to their home base. Larvae can differentiate between new and old trails, preferring newer trails that lead to higher-yielding feeding sites. During a synchronous foraging bout, larvae that are unsuccessful at first return to the tent and pick up fresh trails that were marked by a successful feeder. In addition to indicating the best feeding sites, silk trails allow caterpillars to better grip the substrate over which they are traveling, which further increases foraging efficiency and success.

=== Thermoregulation ===
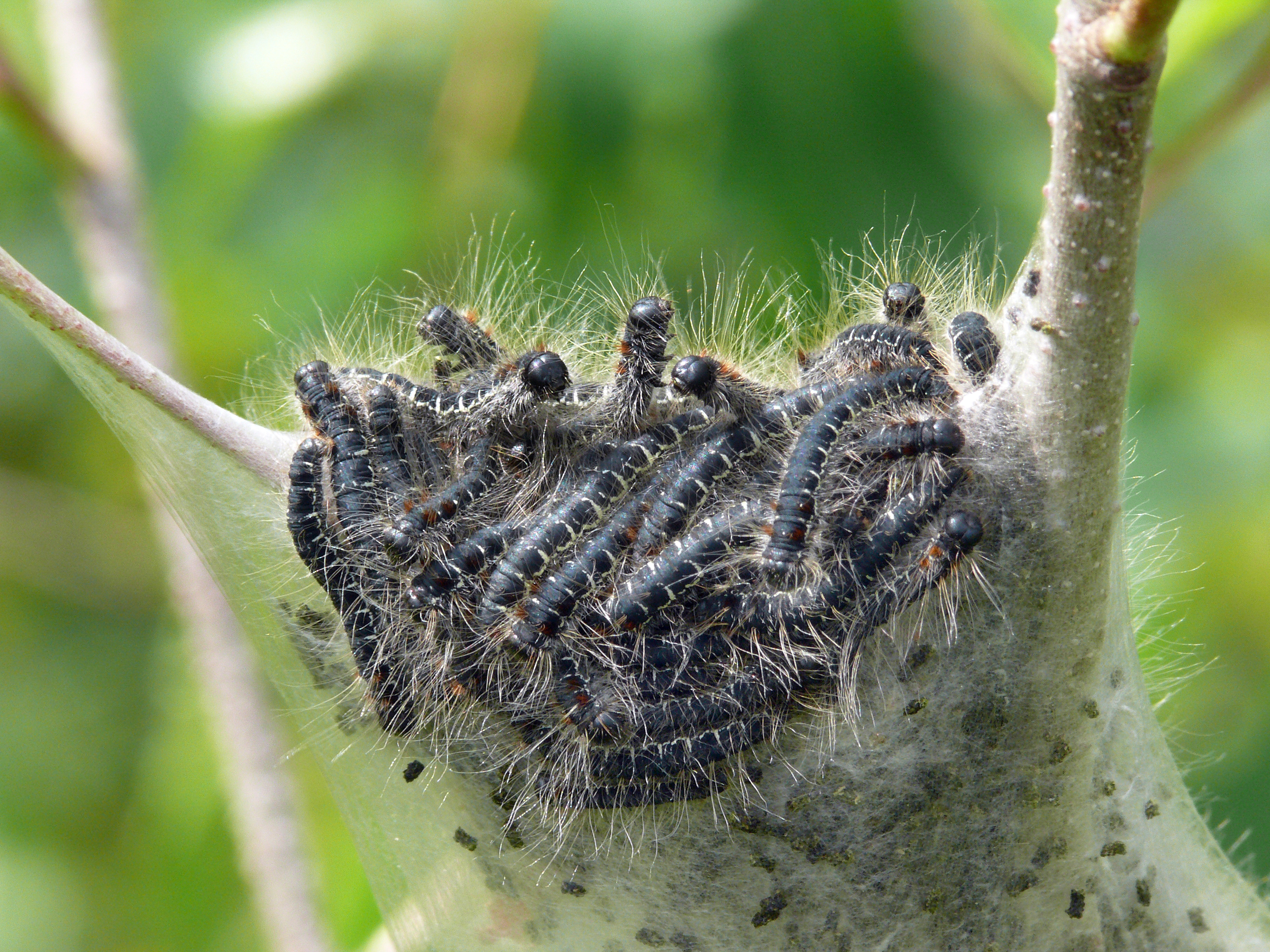
A mass of early instar larvae

Another advantage provided by the small eggar's sociality is their enhanced ability to control the temperature of their immediate surroundings, or thermoregulate. E. lanestris is an ectothermic organism, meaning it relies on its surroundings to regulate its body temperature. Caterpillars must maintain an adequate body temperature in order to move, metabolize, and develop properly. Caterpillars have an optimal temperature range of 30–35 °C, and when they hatch in early spring, ambient temperatures are usually below this threshold. Small individual caterpillars have a low capacity to capture and retain heat, however when 200 individuals group together, their effective mass increases significantly, allowing them to collectively retain more heat. The layered tent structure functions to further insulate caterpillars within the inner chambers. On sunny days when air temperatures may be lower than ideal, caterpillars congregate on the outer surfaces of the tent in direct sunlight. Their black, furry bodies act to absorb radiation and their grouping serves to more effectively prevent heat loss. Additionally, when caterpillars return to the tent after feeding, they enter into a resting and digestion phase. Their metabolisms generate heat energy, which can raise the internal tent temperature as much as 3 °C. As caterpillars enter later larval stages, seasonal temperatures may get too high, so caterpillars are often found on the shaded side of their tent, away from direct sun.

== Life history ==
=== Eggs ===
Female moths lay masses of about 325 eggs on twigs and small branches of the host plant. Each batch of eggs covers approximately 4 cm of area. The eggs all hatch within the span of a few days, save for a relatively small proportion of the egg mass, yielding a larval colony averaging 200 individuals.

=== Larval development ===
Larvae mature through five stages, called instars, over the course of six to seven weeks. During early larval development (instars 1–3), larvae are small and black in coloration, and during late development (instars 4–5), larvae develop urticarial hairs and red coloration. In their fifth instar, larvae lose many of their social behaviors and colonies disband as individuals prepare for pupation.

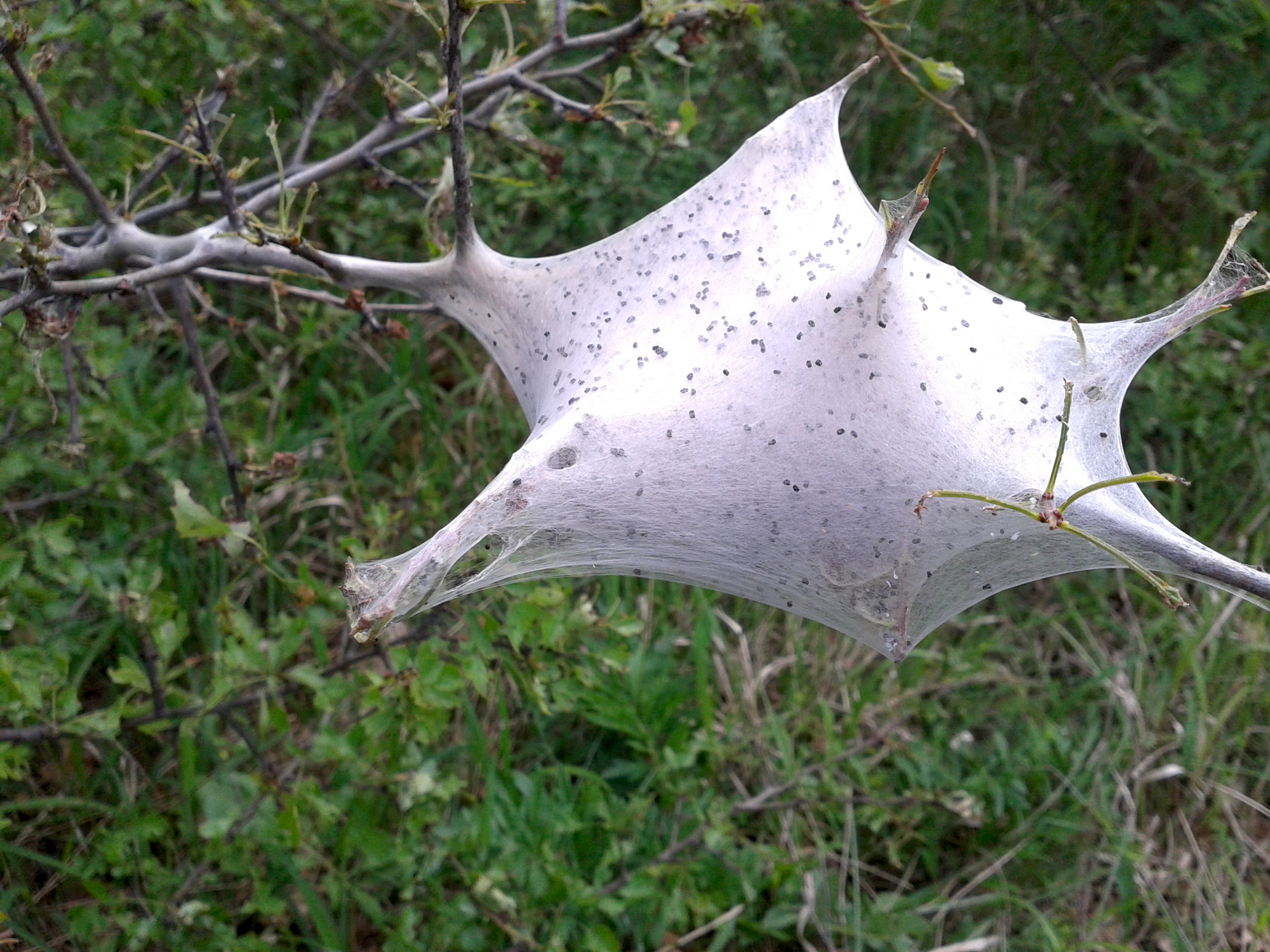
Silk tent of E. lanestris

==== Larval tents ====
E. lanestris eggs hatch in April and May, and following their emergence, caterpillars immediately construct tents out of silk at their hatching site, or nearby on the same bush. They live in these tents as colonies of approximately 200 of their full siblings during their development. They continually repair and expand the same structure throughout larval development. The tent consists of layers of silk fibers that form air pockets which serve to insulate the nest and provide resting spaces for caterpillars inside. Tent structures are severely damaged by heavy rains, which cause their silk layers to stick together, removing air pockets. Dried silk also becomes brittle and fragile, making it susceptible to breaking and tearing. Additionally, small eggars’ tents are bright white and not well-concealed, so they are easily located and damaged by predators like birds. Maintaining the integrity of the tent is essential to larval colonies’ survival, and they do not abandon the tent until just before pupation.

=== Pupation ===
Pupation occurs in early July. Caterpillars form hard, brown, rounded cocoons, which are usually found concealed in low, dense vegetation of hedgerows and bushes, as well is in grass and brush. Pupa overwinter in their cocoons and typically hatch the following spring, however they have been known to remain in pupation for several years when conditions are less than ideal.

=== Adulthood and reproduction ===
Adult moths emerge from their cocoons in March and early April. Adults live for about a week, during which they mate. E. lanestris moths do not feed as adults, so they must rely on their larval nutrition for survival and reproduction during their final life stage. When females deposit eggs on the branches of their host plants, they secrete a protective cover of fluids and anal tuft hairs that hardens into a solid shell. Little is known about the mating behavior of the small eggar moths, however mating behaviors of closely related moths, like the tent moths of the genus Malacosoma, have been studied. In these other tent moths, and likely in E. lanestris as well, males reach sexual maturity faster than females. Moths copulate by joining ends and facing in opposite directions.

== Enemies ==
E. lanestris is preyed on by different organisms throughout its development. During early larval stages, caterpillars are primarily attacked by spiders, ants, beetles, and other insects. As they grow in size, they are more appealing to larger vertebrates. Birds prey on adult moths and have also been known to attack the tents in which larval colonies live and develop, which causes severe structural damage. Field studies have revealed low rates of parasitism among small eggars.

=== Predator defense ===
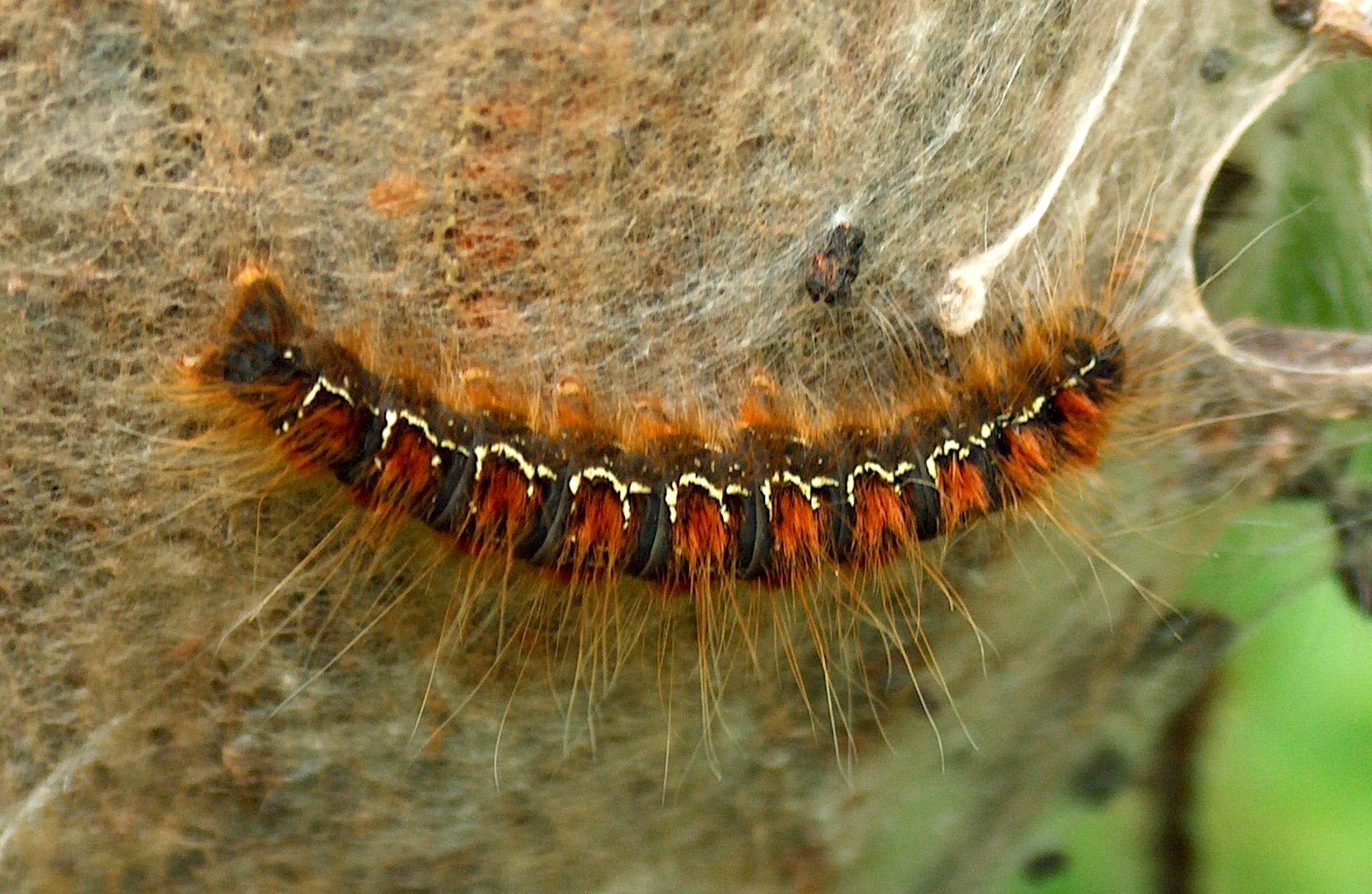
5th instar setae and red coloration

As larvae, E. lanestris exhibits a number of characteristics in their behavior, as well as their anatomy, that provide them protection from predators. These predator defense mechanisms include larvae's synchronous foraging behavior, which decreases individual risk of predation when they leave the safety of their tent. By traveling in large groups, individual caterpillars become more difficult to be singled out by predators. Additionally, the development of red coloring and setae containing a chemical irritant during later instars allows for additional protection from predation. Red coloration serves as a warning sign to birds and other visual predators, and rash-inducing setae function to deter predators upon contact.

== Interactions with humans ==
=== Dermatitis ===
The small eggar is covered in setae, which can cause dermatitis in humans upon contact. These tiny hairs have a tube-like structure that becomes embedded in exposed skin, delivering a chemical irritant. Reactions vary in severity, but typically present as an itchy rash that spreads from the area of contact and can develop red bumps and papules. The rash usually clears up after about a week.

Cases of small eggar-related dermatitis have resulted from direct handling of caterpillars as well as indirect exposure to setae. Adult moths have fewer setae on their bodies and therefore pose less of a risk of dermatological reaction to humans.

=== Crop pests ===
E. lanestris is often found on fruit trees including apple, pear, damson, and plum trees. Infestation of these crop trees does not generally result in damage to the fruits they produce, however, larvae can cause considerable damage to the trees' leaves, resulting in significant defoliation. In general, E. lanestris occupies these trees less than its other host plants, and it is not considered a pest of high importance.

=== Conservation ===
Since the 1970s, the small eggar population has been declining in its native habitat in Britain, Wales, and Ireland. Once abundant, the population now exists in scattered colonies across its range. In Britain, the small eggar is considered nationally scarce. The moth's decreased abundance is attributed mainly to hedgerow trimming and intensive roadside mowing that directly harm the insect or destroy its host plants.
