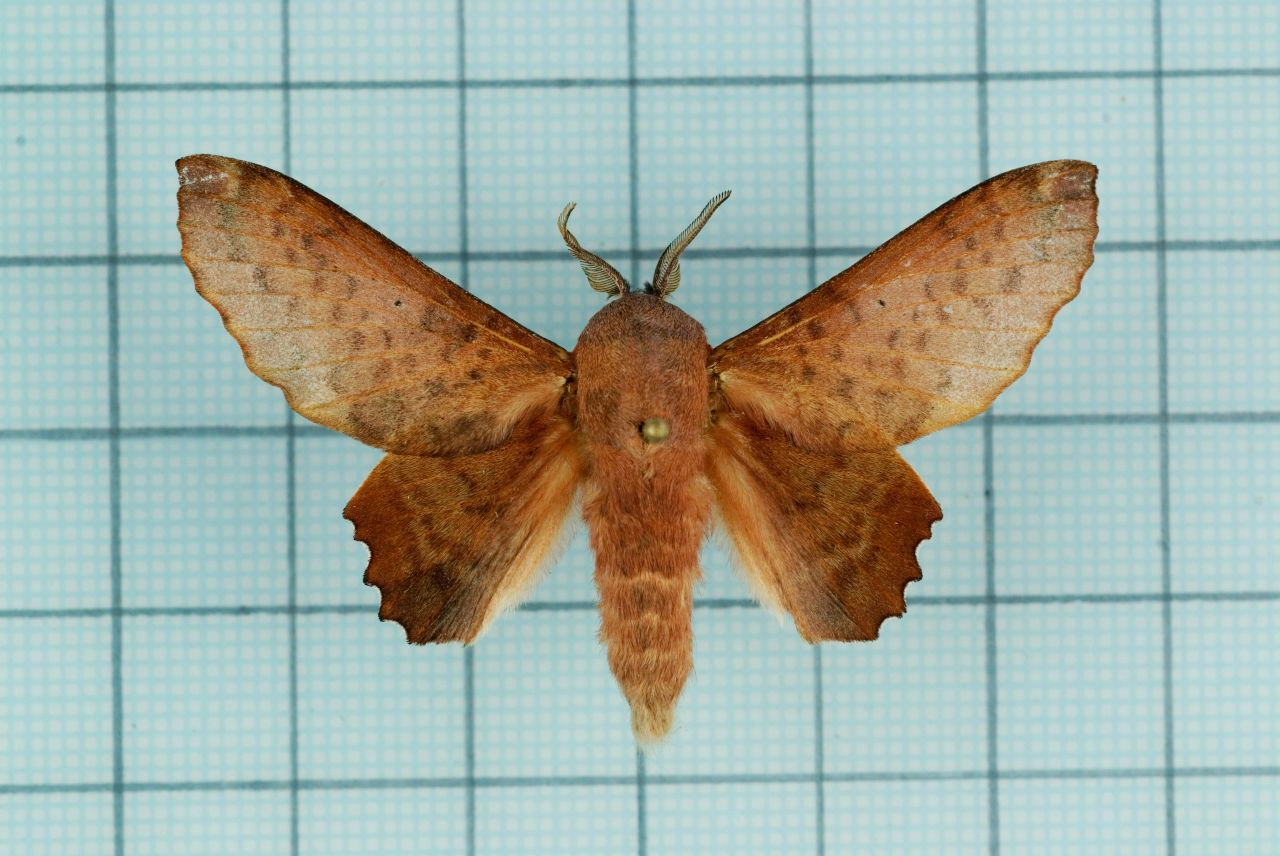
- Paradoxopla sinuata

Scientific classification
- Kingdom: Animalia
- Phylum: Arthropoda
- Class: Insecta
- Order: Lepidoptera
- Family: Lasiocampidae
- Genus: Paradoxopla de Lajonquiere, 1976

= Paradoxopla =

Genus of moths

Paradoxopla is a genus of moths in the family Lasiocampidae. The genus was erected by Yves de Lajonquière in 1976. It is found from India to Taiwan.

== Species and subspecies ==
Based on the Global Biodiversity Information Facility:

- Paradoxopla bicrenulata Bethune-Baker, 1915
- Paradoxopla cardinalis Holloway, 1987
- Paradoxopla sinuata Moore, 1879
  - Paradoxopla sinuata orientalis de Lajonquière, 1976
  - Paradoxopla sinuata sinuata
- Paradoxopla undulifera Walker, 1855
