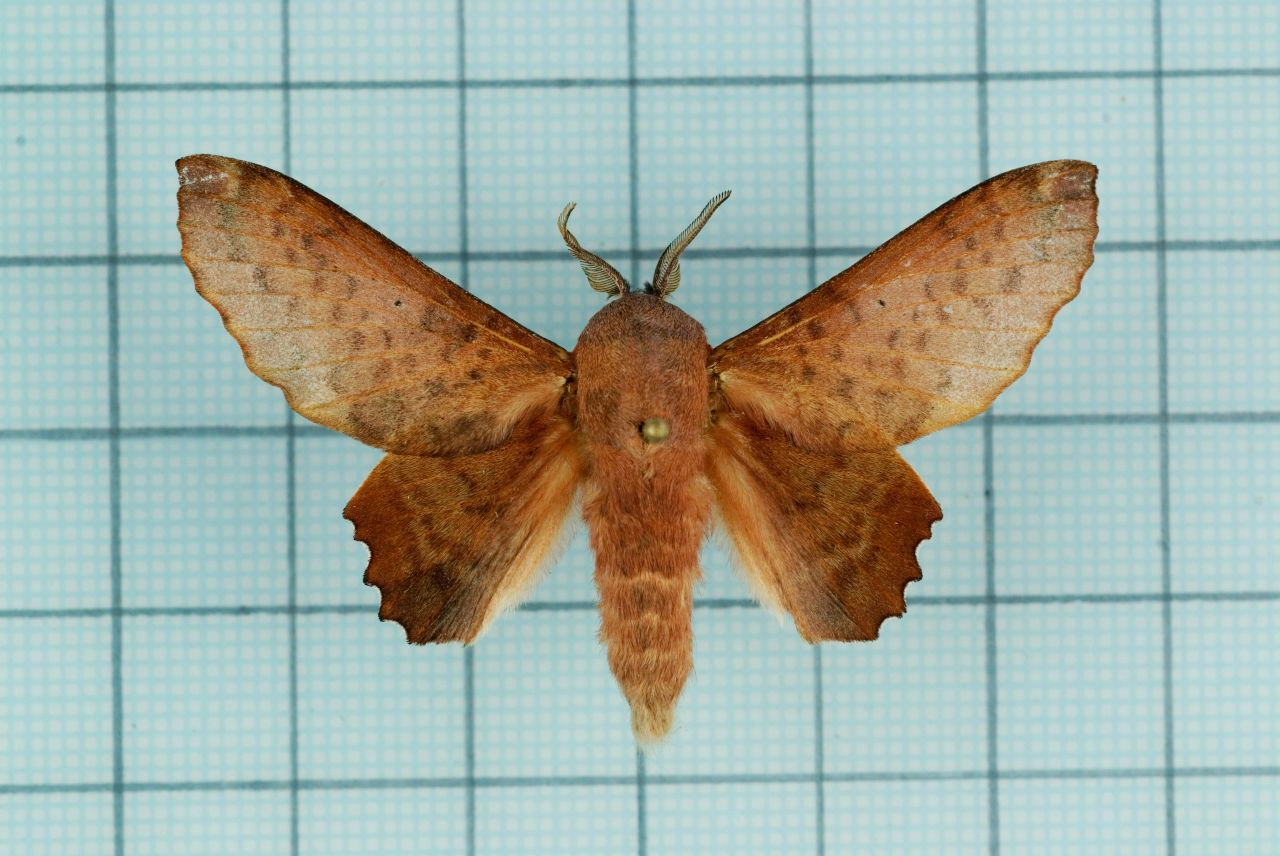
- Paradoxopla sinuata taiwana female
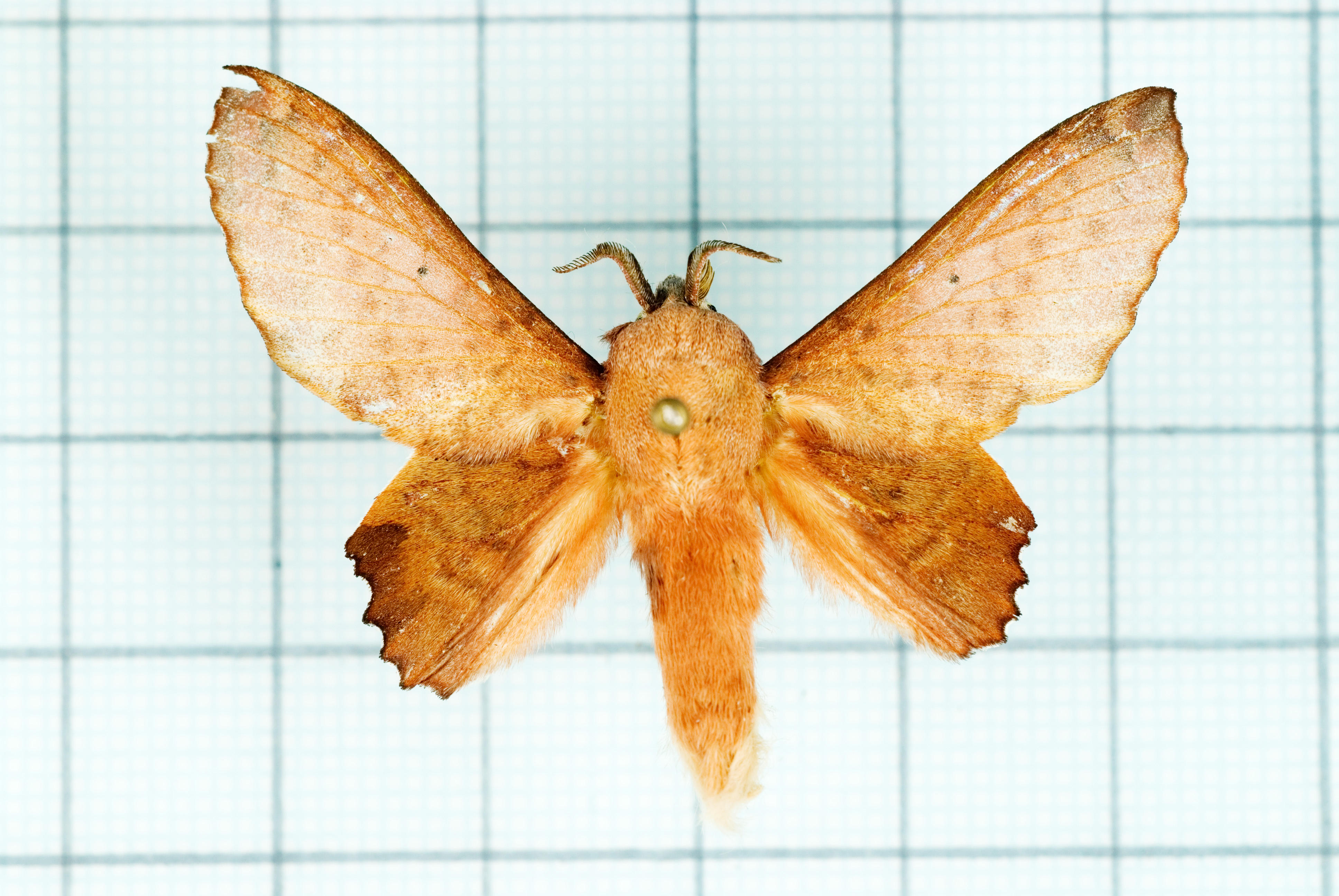
- Paradoxopla sinuata taiwana male

Scientific classification
- Kingdom: Animalia
- Phylum: Arthropoda
- Class: Insecta
- Order: Lepidoptera
- Family: Lasiocampidae
- Genus: Paradoxopla
- Species: P. sinuata

Binomial name
- Paradoxopla sinuata (Moore, 1879)

Synonyms
- Gastropacha sinuata Moore, 1879; Stenophyllodes khasiana Swinhoe, 1905

= Paradoxopla sinuata =

Species of moth

Paradoxopla sinuata is a moth of the family Lasiocampidae. It is found from India to Taiwan.

== Subspecies ==
- Paradoxopla sinuata sinuata (India)
- Paradoxopla sinuata taiwana (Wileman, 1915) (Taiwan)
- Paradoxopla sinuata fabulosa Zolotuhin, 2005 (Vietnam)
- Paradoxopla sinuata orientalis Lajonquière, 1976 (China)
