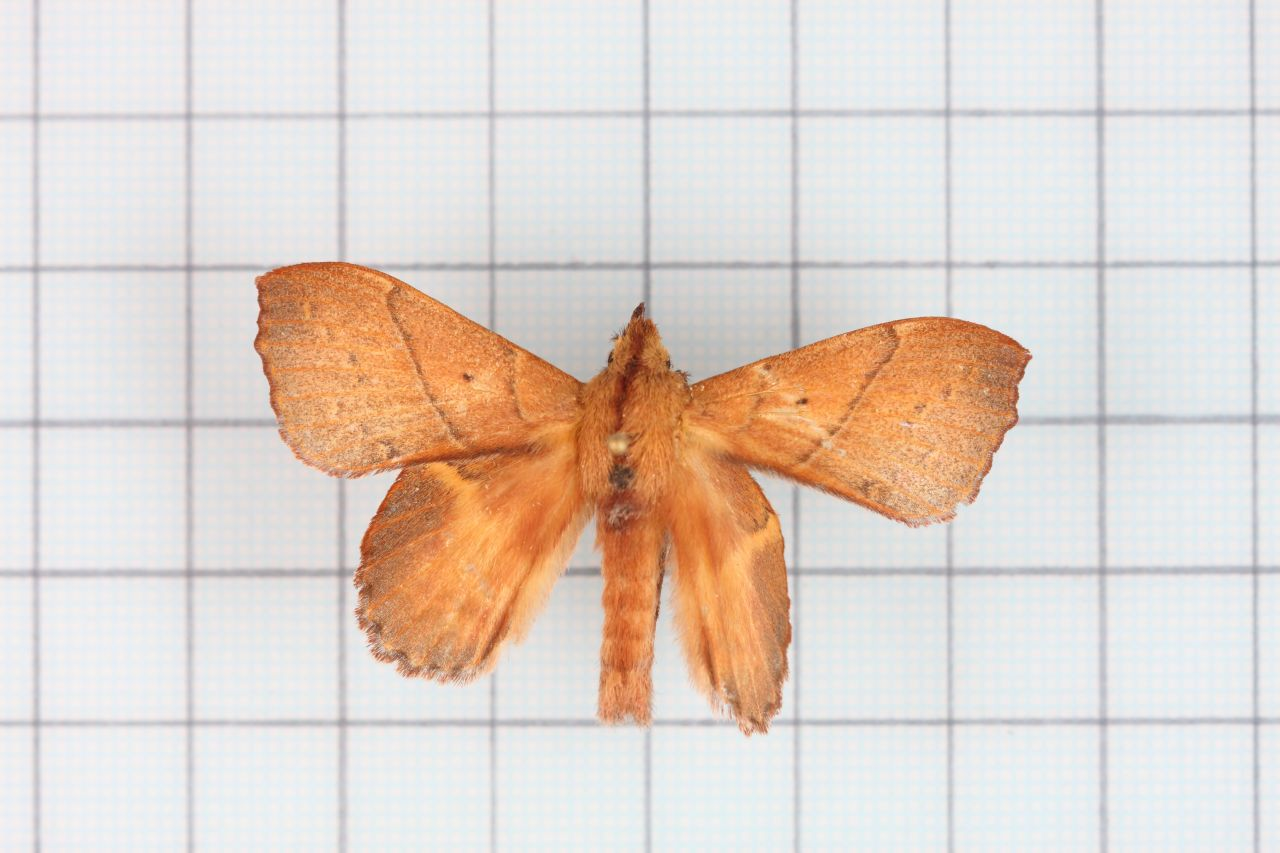
- Radhica flavovittata taiwanensis
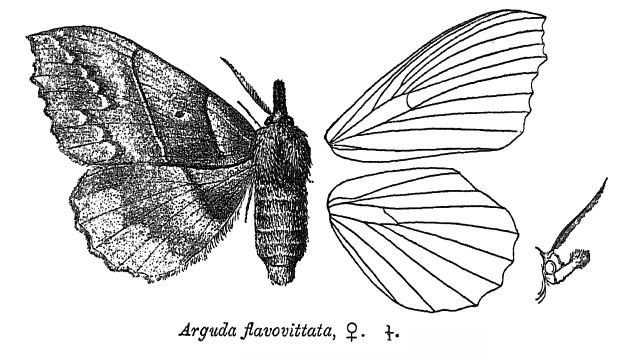
- Radhica flavovittata flavovittata

Scientific classification
- Domain: Eukaryota
- Kingdom: Animalia
- Phylum: Arthropoda
- Class: Insecta
- Order: Lepidoptera
- Family: Lasiocampidae
- Genus: Radhica
- Species: R. flavovittata

Binomial name
- Radhica flavovittata Moore, 1879

Synonyms
- Arguda flavovittata

= Radhica flavovittata =

Species of moth

Radhica flavovittata is a species of moth of the family Lasiocampidae. It is found in India and Taiwan.

== Subspecies ==
- Radhica flavovittata flavovittata
- Radhica flavovittata taiwanensis (Matsumura, 1927) (Taiwan)
- Radhica flavovittata puana Zolotuhin, 1995
