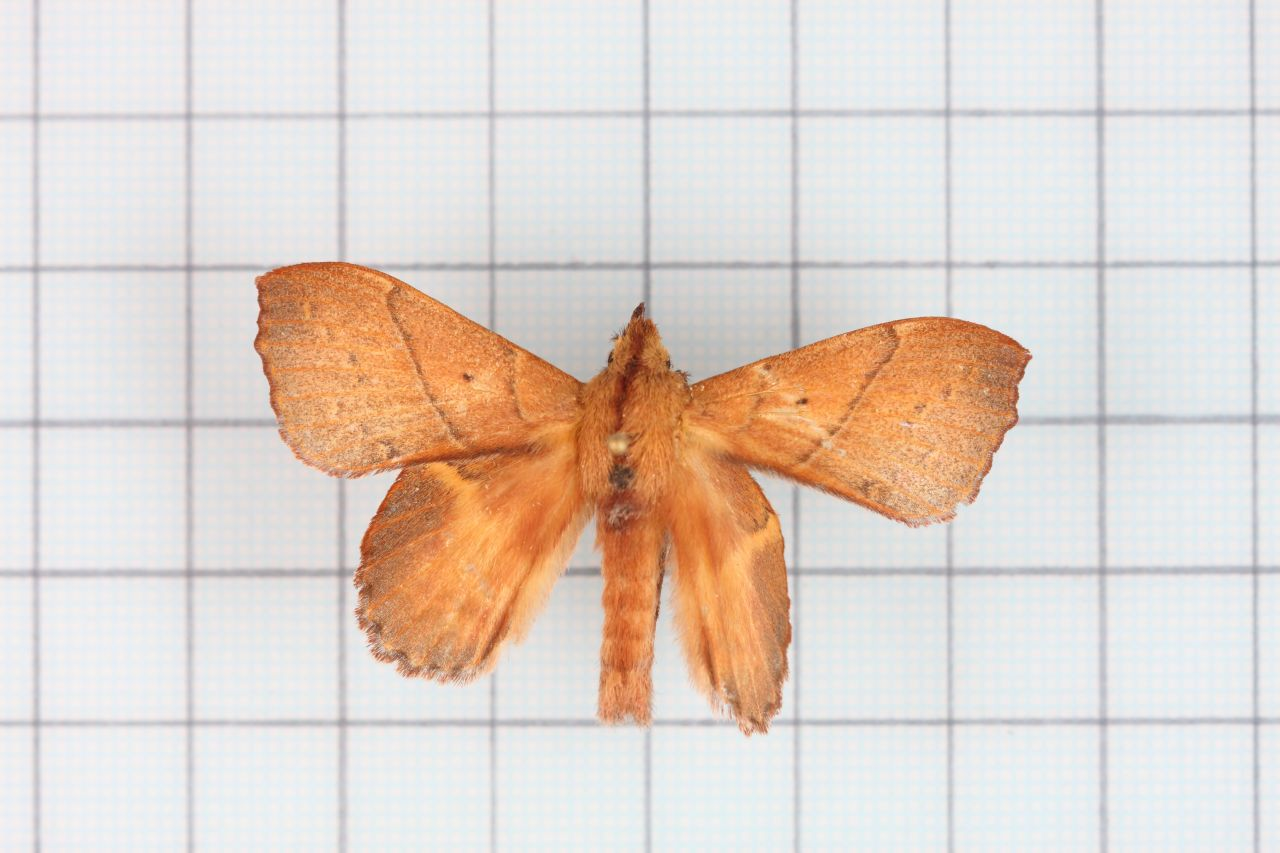
- Radhica flavovittata

Scientific classification
- Domain: Eukaryota
- Kingdom: Animalia
- Phylum: Arthropoda
- Class: Insecta
- Order: Lepidoptera
- Family: Lasiocampidae
- Genus: Radhica; Moore, 1879

= Radhica =

Genus of moths

Radhica is a genus of moths in the family Lasiocampidae. The genus was erected by Moore in 1879.

== Selected species ==
- Radhica elisabethae de Lajonquière, 1977
- Radhica flavovittata Moore, 1879
- Radhica himerta (Swinhoe, 1893)
- Radhica holoxantha (Grünberg, 1913)
- Radhica rosea Hampson, 1891
- Radhica vasilissae Zolotuhin & Sinyaev, 2009
