= Mallocampa jaensis =

Scientific classification
- Kingdom: Animalia
- Phylum: Arthropoda
- Class: Insecta
- Order: Lepidoptera
- Family: Lasiocampidae
- Genus: Mallocampa
- Species: M. jaensis

Binomial name
- Mallocampa jaensis Bethune-Baker, 1927

Species of moth

Mallocampa jaensis is a moth in the family Lasiocampidae. It was described by George Thomas Bethune-Baker in 1927. It is found in Cameroon.

The wingspan is about 86 mm for females and 50 mm for males. The forewings are greyish olive brown, with the base dark for a restricted area, followed by a paler stripe and then by a double irregular angled line. The cell and a small median area are dark brownish grey and there is a white spot at the end of the cell, as well as a postmedian double, irregular, subcrenulate line defining the dark median area. The apex and termen are darkish. The hindwings are uniform sooty brown.
