= Mallocampa =

Scientific classification
- Kingdom: Animalia
- Phylum: Arthropoda
- Class: Insecta
- Order: Lepidoptera
- Family: Lasiocampidae
- Genus: Mallocampa; Aurivillius, 1902

Genus of moths

Mallocampa is a genus of moths in the family Lasiocampidae. The genus was erected by Per Olof Christopher Aurivillius in 1902.

== Species ==
- Mallocampa alenica Strand, 1912
- Mallocampa audea Druce, 1887
- Mallocampa cornutiventris Tams, 1929
- Mallocampa dollmani Tams, 1925
- Mallocampa jaensis Bethune-Baker, 1927
- Mallocampa leighi Aurivillius, 1922
- Mallocampa leucophaea Holland, 1893
- Mallocampa porphyria Holland, 1893
- Mallocampa punctilimbata Strand, 1912
- Mallocampa schultzei Aurivillius
- Mallocampa toulgoeti Rougeot, 1977
- Mallocampa zopheropa Bethune-Baker, 1911
