= List of moths of India (Eupterotidae) =

This is a list of moths of the family Eupterotidae that are found in India. It also acts as an index to the species articles and forms part of the full List of moths of India.

== Genus Gangarides ==
- Gangarides roseus Walker

Note that Gangarides is now placed in the family Notodontidae the placement here is sensu Hampson, 1892

== Genus Pandala ==
- Pandala dolosa Walker

== Genus Melanothrix ==
- Melanothrix leucotrigona Hampson

== Genus Dreata ==
- Dreata hades Walker

== Genus Palirisa ==
- Palirisa lineosa Walker
- Palirisa cervina Moore

== Genus Tagora ==
- Tagora patula Walker
- Tagora pallida Walker
- Tagora nigriceps Hampson
- Tagora murina Moore

== Genus Pseudojana ==
- Pseudojana incandescens Walker

== Genus Ganisa ==
- Ganisa postica Walker
- Ganisa pandya Moore
- Ganisa glaucescens Walker

== Genus Apha ==
- Apha subdives Walker
- Apha floralis Butler
- Apha fenestrata Butler

== Genus Apona ==
- Apona cashmirensis Kollar
- Apona plumosa Moore
- Apona shevaroyensis Moore

== Genus Eupterote ==
- Eupterote citrina Walker
- Eupterote diffusa Walker
- Eupterote fabia Cramer
- Eupterote flavicollis Otter
- Eupterote flavida Moore
- Eupterote geminata Walker
- Eupterote lineosa Walker
- Eupterote minor Moore
- Eupterote mollifera Walker
- Eupterote plumipes Walker
- Eupterote primularis Moore
- Eupterote testacea Walker
- Eupterote translata Swinhoe
- Eupterote undans Walker
- Eupterote undata Blanch
- Eupterote unicolor Hampson
- Eupterote vialis Moore

== Genus Nisaga ==
- Nisaga simplex Walker

== Genus Sangatissa ==
- Sangatissa subcurvifera Walker

== Genus Cnethocampa ==
- Cnethocampa cheela Moore

== See also ==
- Eupterotidae
- Moths
- Lepidoptera
- List of moths of India
