= List of moths of Nepal (Eupterotidae) =

The following is a list of Eupterotidae of Nepal. Fourteen different species are listed.

This list is primarily based on Colin Smith's 2010 "Lepidoptera of Nepal", which is based on Toshiro Haruta's "Moths of Nepal (Vol. 1-6)" with some recent additions and a modernized classification.

- Apha floralis
- Apona caschmirensis
- Eupterote gardneri syn. Eupterote bifasciata
- Eupterote fabia
- Eupterote geminata
- Eupterote glaucescens
- Eupterote lineosa
- Eupterote undata
- Ganisa plana
- Ganisa similis
- Nisaga simplex
- Palirisa cervina
- Palirisa lineosa
- Pseudojana incandescens

== See also ==
- List of butterflies of Nepal
- Odonata of Nepal
- Cerambycidae of Nepal
- Wildlife of Nepal
