= Pseudojana obscura =

Scientific classification
- Kingdom: Animalia
- Phylum: Arthropoda
- Clade: Pancrustacea
- Class: Insecta
- Order: Lepidoptera
- Family: Eupterotidae
- Genus: Pseudojana
- Species: P. obscura

Binomial name
- Pseudojana obscura Holloway, 1987

Species of moth

Pseudojana obscura is a moth in the family Eupterotidae. It was described by Jeremy Daniel Holloway in 1987. It is found on Borneo and Peninsular Malaysia. The habitat consists of lowland dipterocarp forests.

The wingspan is about 32 mm. Adults are similar to Pseudojana perspicuifascia, but are smaller and redder, with the fasciation being less pronounced.
