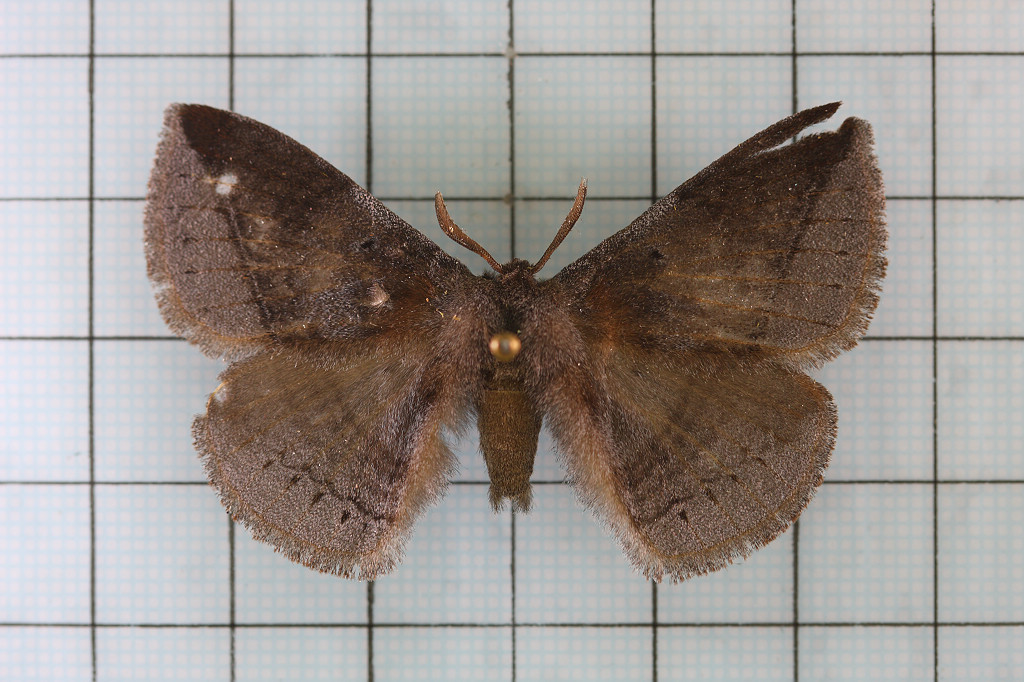
- Ganisa postica

Scientific classification
- Kingdom: Animalia
- Phylum: Arthropoda
- Clade: Pancrustacea
- Class: Insecta
- Order: Lepidoptera
- Family: Eupterotidae
- Subfamily: Eupterotinae
- Tribe: Eupterotini
- Genus: Ganisa; Walker, 1855

Type species
- Ganisa postica Walker, 1855

= Ganisa =

Genus of moths

Ganisa is a genus of moths of the family Eupterotidae first described by Francis Walker in 1855.

== Selected species ==
- Ganisa cyanogrisea Mell, 1929
- Ganisa floresiaca Nässig, 2009
- Ganisa gyraleus Orhant, 2000
- Ganisa longipennata Mell, 1958
- Ganisa plana Walker, 1855
- Ganisa postica Walker, 1855
- Ganisa pulupuluana Nässig, Ignatyev & Witt, 2009
- Ganisa similis Moore, 1884

== Status unknown ==
- Ganisa aponoides
- Ganisa cyanomelaena
- Ganisa formosicola
- Ganisa javana
- Ganisa lignea

== Former species ==
- Ganisa glaucescens Walker, 1855
- Ganisa kuangtungensis
- Ganisa melli
- Ganisa pandya Moore, 1865
