= Eupterote multiarcuata =

Scientific classification
- Kingdom: Animalia
- Phylum: Arthropoda
- Clade: Pancrustacea
- Class: Insecta
- Order: Lepidoptera
- Family: Eupterotidae
- Genus: Eupterote
- Species: E. multiarcuata

Binomial name
- Eupterote multiarcuata Holloway, 1976

Species of moth

Eupterote multiarcuata is a moth in the family Eupterotidae. It was described by Jeremy Daniel Holloway in 1976. It is found on Borneo, Sumatra and Peninsular Malaysia. The habitat consists of hill dipterocarp and upper montane forests. The Global Lepidoptera Names Index has this name as a synonym of Eupterote mollifera.
