= Melanothrix semperi =

Scientific classification
- Kingdom: Animalia
- Phylum: Arthropoda
- Class: Insecta
- Order: Lepidoptera
- Family: Eupterotidae
- Genus: Melanothrix
- Species: M. semperi

Binomial name
- Melanothrix semperi Rothschild, 1917

Synonyms
- Melanothrix pulchricolor sensu Semper

Species of moth

Melanothrix semperi is a moth in the family Eupterotidae. It was described by Rothschild in 1917. It is found in the Philippines (Mindanao).

The wings of the adults are similar to Melanothrix nymphaliaria, but are less black. The abdomen is yellow with black transverse bands.
