= Ganisa cyanogrisea =

Scientific classification
- Kingdom: Animalia
- Phylum: Arthropoda
- Class: Insecta
- Order: Lepidoptera
- Family: Eupterotidae
- Genus: Ganisa
- Species: G. cyanogrisea

Binomial name
- Ganisa cyanogrisea Mell, 1929

Species of moth

Ganisa cyanogrisea is a moth in the family Eupterotidae. It was described by Rudolf Mell in 1929. It is found in China. The Global Lepidoptera Names Index considers this to be a synonym of Ganisa similis.
