= Drepanojana =

Scientific classification
- Kingdom: Animalia
- Phylum: Arthropoda
- Class: Insecta
- Order: Lepidoptera
- Family: Eupterotidae
- Subfamily: Janinae
- Genus: Drepanojana; Aurivillius, 1893
- Species: D. fasciata

Binomial name
- Drepanojana fasciata Aurivillius, 1893

Synonyms
- Drepanojana apicalis Aurivillius, 1915; Melanothris maeonia Druce, 1896

Genus of insects

Drepanojana is a monotypic moth genus in the family Eupterotidae. Its single species, Drepanojana fasciata, is found in Ghana, Nigeria and Sierra Leone. Both the genus and species were described by Per Olof Christopher Aurivillius in 1893.

The wingspan is about 40 mm. Both wings are uniform dark umber brown. The forewings, at the costa near the apex in the areas seven and eight, with a creamy spot and with a similar small submarginal dot in the sixth area.

== Former species ==
- Drepanojana citheronia Bryk, 1944 is now Eupterote citheronia (Bryk, 1944).
