= Palirisa sinensis =

Scientific classification
- Kingdom: Animalia
- Phylum: Arthropoda
- Class: Insecta
- Order: Lepidoptera
- Family: Eupterotidae
- Genus: Palirisa
- Species: P. sinensis

Binomial name
- Palirisa sinensis Rothschild, 1917

Species of moth

Palirisa sinensis is a moth in the family Eupterotidae. It was described by Rothschild in 1917. It is found in China.

The wingspan is 88 mm for males and 131 mm for females. Adults are similar to Palirisa cervina but are smaller and much paler, more silver-grey, and the transverse bands of the forewings are closer together and much fainter. Furthermore, the females are much less rufous than cervina, and the transverse bands are also much closer together.
