= Eupterote todara =

Scientific classification
- Kingdom: Animalia
- Phylum: Arthropoda
- Clade: Pancrustacea
- Class: Insecta
- Order: Lepidoptera
- Family: Eupterotidae
- Genus: Eupterote
- Species: E. todara

Binomial name
- Eupterote todara Moore, 1884

Species of moth

Eupterote todara is a moth in the family Eupterotidae. It was described by Frederic Moore in 1884. It is found in India.

The wingspan is 64–72 mm. Adults are similar to Eupterote mollifera, but the cilia is yellow, the postmedial lines are indistinct, the black spots near the inner margin of the forewings are prominent and the inner postmedial line of the hindwings is nearer to the base.
