= Eupterote placida =

Scientific classification
- Kingdom: Animalia
- Phylum: Arthropoda
- Clade: Pancrustacea
- Class: Insecta
- Order: Lepidoptera
- Family: Eupterotidae
- Genus: Eupterote
- Species: E. placida

Binomial name
- Eupterote placida (Moore, [1883])

Synonyms
- Horanpella placida Moore, [1883]

Species of moth

Eupterote placida is a moth in the family Eupterotidae. It was described by Frederic Moore in 1883. It is found in Sri Lanka. The Global Lepidoptera Names Index has this name as a synonym of Eupterote hibisci.

Adults are pale ochreous brown, the forewings with a transverse submarginal indistinct brown line, externally to which is a row of indistinct brown-specked spots. The hindwings have a similar indistinct brown line and outer spots.
