= Eupterote axesta =

Scientific classification
- Kingdom: Animalia
- Phylum: Arthropoda
- Clade: Pancrustacea
- Class: Insecta
- Order: Lepidoptera
- Family: Eupterotidae
- Genus: Eupterote
- Species: E. axesta

Binomial name
- Eupterote axesta C. Swinhoe, 1894

Synonyms
- Eupterote acesta [lapsus]

Species of moth

Eupterote acesta is a species of moth in the family Eupterotidae. It was described by Charles Swinhoe in 1894. It is found in Thailand and India.

The wingspan is about 62 mm. Adult males are similar to Eupterote fabia, but are buff. The forewings have two antemedial, one medial and three postmedial lines reduced to spots. The double postmedial line is not differentiated and the submarginal lunulate band is complete. The hindwings have two medial waved lines, a postmedial straight line, and a prominent waved submarginal line. Females are pale reddish brown, with the lines on the basal area more or less obsolete.
