= Melanothrix philippina =

Scientific classification
- Kingdom: Animalia
- Phylum: Arthropoda
- Class: Insecta
- Order: Lepidoptera
- Family: Eupterotidae
- Genus: Melanothrix
- Species: M. philippina

Binomial name
- Melanothrix philippina Rothschild, 1917

Synonyms
- Melanothrix nymphaliaria philippina Rothschild, 1917

Species of moth

Melanothrix philippina is a moth in the family Eupterotidae. It was described by Rothschild in 1917. It is found in the Philippines.

Adults are similar to Melanothrix nymphaliaria, but the forewings are entirely black, with only a crenulate patch beyond the cell and the basal half of the wing below vein one alone being white. The black of the hindwings is also wider, occupying the outer half of the wing.
