= Apona frater =

Scientific classification
- Kingdom: Animalia
- Phylum: Arthropoda
- Class: Insecta
- Order: Lepidoptera
- Family: Eupterotidae
- Genus: Apona
- Species: A. frater

Binomial name
- Apona frater Rothschild, 1917

Species of moth

Apona frater is a moth in the family Eupterotidae. It was described by Rothschild in 1917. It is found in India.

The wingspan is about 138 mm. Adults are similar to Apona shevaroyensis but are smaller and greyer. It can also be distinguished by the produced apical lappet of the forewings and by the very much stronger and heavier markings.
