= Eupterote calandra =

Scientific classification
- Kingdom: Animalia
- Phylum: Arthropoda
- Clade: Pancrustacea
- Class: Insecta
- Order: Lepidoptera
- Family: Eupterotidae
- Genus: Eupterote
- Species: E. calandra

Binomial name
- Eupterote calandra C. Swinhoe, 1894

Species of moth

Eupterote calandra is a moth in the family Eupterotidae. It was described by Charles Swinhoe in 1894. It is found in India.
