= Eupterote crinita =

Scientific classification
- Kingdom: Animalia
- Phylum: Arthropoda
- Clade: Pancrustacea
- Class: Insecta
- Order: Lepidoptera
- Family: Eupterotidae
- Genus: Eupterote
- Species: E. crinita

Binomial name
- Eupterote crinita C. Swinhoe, 1899

Species of moth

Eupterote crinita is a moth in the family Eupterotidae. It was described by Charles Swinhoe in 1899. It is found in India.

The forewings are dark olive brown, crossed by indistinct dark bands, the most distinct being a broad even discal band, with indications of a yellowish outer edging, followed by some yellow lunular marks, but the whole wing is so thickly clothed with long brown hairs as to make all the bands and markings very indistinct. The hindwings are even more thickly clothed with paler brown hairs over a yellow ground colour, leaving an indistinct central broad brown band visible. A more prominent discal band, corresponding to the indistinct discal band of the forewings, is followed by a broad yellow band, which includes a row of dark brown spots with outward spear-shaped ends surrounded by yellow, and limiting the dark brown broad border.
