= Ganisa pulupuluana =

Scientific classification
- Kingdom: Animalia
- Phylum: Arthropoda
- Clade: Pancrustacea
- Class: Insecta
- Order: Lepidoptera
- Family: Eupterotidae
- Genus: Ganisa
- Species: G. pulupuluana

Binomial name
- Ganisa pulupuluana Nässig, Ignatyev & Witt, 2009

Species of moth

Ganisa pulupuluana is a moth in the family Eupterotidae. It was described by Wolfgang A. Nässig, Nikolay N. Ignatyev and Thomas Joseph Witt in 2009. It is found on Sulawesi in Indonesia.

There are probably multiple generations per year.
