= Pseudojana clemensi =

Scientific classification
- Kingdom: Animalia
- Phylum: Arthropoda
- Class: Insecta
- Order: Lepidoptera
- Family: Eupterotidae
- Genus: Pseudojana
- Species: P. clemensi

Binomial name
- Pseudojana clemensi Schultze, 1910

Species of moth

Pseudojana clemensi is a moth in the family Eupterotidae. It was described by Schultze in 1910. It is found in the Philippines (Mindanao).
