= Eupterote formosana =

Scientific classification
- Kingdom: Animalia
- Phylum: Arthropoda
- Clade: Pancrustacea
- Class: Insecta
- Order: Lepidoptera
- Family: Eupterotidae
- Genus: Eupterote
- Species: E. formosana

Binomial name
- Eupterote formosana Matsumura, 1908

Species of moth

Eupterote formosana is a moth in the family Eupterotidae. It was described by Shōnen Matsumura in 1908. It is found in Taiwan.
