= Eupterote amaena =

Scientific classification
- Kingdom: Animalia
- Phylum: Arthropoda
- Clade: Pancrustacea
- Class: Insecta
- Order: Lepidoptera
- Family: Eupterotidae
- Genus: Eupterote
- Species: E. amaena

Binomial name
- Eupterote amaena (Walker, 1855)

Synonyms
- Tagora amaena Walker, 1855

Species of moth

Eupterote amaena is a moth in the family Eupterotidae. It was described by Francis Walker in 1855. It is found on Java and Sumatra.

The larvae feed on Vitex, Piper, Erythrina and Dioscorea species.
