= Patulognatha nigriceps =

Scientific classification
- Kingdom: Animalia
- Phylum: Arthropoda
- Class: Insecta
- Order: Lepidoptera
- Family: Eupterotidae
- Genus: Eupterote
- Species: E. nigriceps

Binomial name
- Eupterote nigriceps (Hampson, 1893)

Synonyms
- Tagora nigriceps Hampson, 1893

Species of moth

Patulognatha nigriceps is a moth in the family Eupterotidae. It was described by George Hampson in 1893. It is found in Sri Lanka. The genus name was revised in 2024 and currently included in the endemic genus Patulognatha.

The wingspan is about 96 mm. The wings are brownish grey, the forewings with traces of some waved antemedial lines and with a hyaline (glass-like) speck at the end of the cell. There are five waved lines beyond the middle. The postmedial line is indistinct and the waved submarginal line sends out dark streaks along the veins to the postmedial line. The undulation between veins two and three is filled in by a dark brown blotch. The hindwings have four waved lines before the postmedial straight line, which is just beyond the middle and there is a waved submarginal line, which is remote from the margin.
