= Eupterote harmani =

Scientific classification
- Kingdom: Animalia
- Phylum: Arthropoda
- Clade: Pancrustacea
- Class: Insecta
- Order: Lepidoptera
- Family: Eupterotidae
- Genus: Eupterote
- Species: E. harmani

Binomial name
- Eupterote harmani Holloway, 1987

Species of moth

Eupterote harmani is a moth in the family Eupterotidae. It was described by Jeremy Daniel Holloway in 1987. It is found on Borneo. The habitat consists of hill dipterocarp and upper montane forests.
