= Melanothrix alternans =

Scientific classification
- Kingdom: Animalia
- Phylum: Arthropoda
- Class: Insecta
- Order: Lepidoptera
- Family: Eupterotidae
- Genus: Melanothrix
- Species: M. alternans

Binomial name
- Melanothrix alternans Pagenstecher, 1890

Synonyms
- Melanothrix homochroa Grunberg, 1914

Species of moth

Melanothrix alternans is a moth in the family Eupterotidae. It was described by Pagenstecher in 1890. It is found in the Philippines (Palawan) and on Borneo. The habitat consists of hill dipterocarp forests and wet heath forests.
