= Eupterote celebica =

Scientific classification
- Kingdom: Animalia
- Phylum: Arthropoda
- Clade: Pancrustacea
- Class: Insecta
- Order: Lepidoptera
- Family: Eupterotidae
- Genus: Eupterote
- Species: E. celebica

Binomial name
- Eupterote celebica Nässig, Holloway & Beeke, 2011

Species of moth

Eupterote celebica is a moth in the family Eupterotidae. It was described by Wolfgang A. Nässig, Jeremy Daniel Holloway and Martin Beeke in 2011. It is found in Sulawesi, Indonesia.

The length of the forewings is 37–40 mm for males and 51 mm for females.
