= Apona mandarina =

Scientific classification
- Kingdom: Animalia
- Phylum: Arthropoda
- Class: Insecta
- Order: Lepidoptera
- Family: Eupterotidae
- Genus: Apona
- Species: A. mandarina

Binomial name
- Apona mandarina (Leech, 1898)

Synonyms
- Jana mandarina Leech, 1898; Palirisa mandarina Leech, 1898

Species of moth

Apona mandarina is a moth in the family Eupterotidae. It was described by John Henry Leech in 1898. It is found in central and western China.

Adults vary in ground colour from ashy grey to fawn or dark chestnut.
