= Palirisa salex =

Scientific classification
- Kingdom: Animalia
- Phylum: Arthropoda
- Class: Insecta
- Order: Lepidoptera
- Family: Eupterotidae
- Genus: Palirisa
- Species: P. salex

Binomial name
- Palirisa salex Pugaev & T.T. Du, 2011

Species of moth

Palirisa salex is a moth in the family Eupterotidae. It was described by Pugaev and T.T. Du in 2011. It is found in Vietnam.
