= Eupterote splendens =

Scientific classification
- Kingdom: Animalia
- Phylum: Arthropoda
- Clade: Pancrustacea
- Class: Insecta
- Order: Lepidoptera
- Family: Eupterotidae
- Genus: Eupterote
- Species: E. splendens

Binomial name
- Eupterote splendens Nässig & C. H. Schulze, 2007

Species of moth

Eupterote splendens is a moth in the family Eupterotidae. It was described by Wolfgang A. Nässig and Christian H. Schulze in 2007. It is found in Sulawesi, Indonesia.
