= Ganisa gyraleus =

Scientific classification
- Kingdom: Animalia
- Phylum: Arthropoda
- Class: Insecta
- Order: Lepidoptera
- Family: Eupterotidae
- Genus: Ganisa
- Species: G. gyraleus

Binomial name
- Ganisa gyraleus Orhant, 2000

Species of moth

Ganisa gyraleus is a moth in the family Eupterotidae. It is found in Thailand.
