= Apona ligustri =

Scientific classification
- Kingdom: Animalia
- Phylum: Arthropoda
- Class: Insecta
- Order: Lepidoptera
- Family: Eupterotidae
- Genus: Apona
- Species: A. ligustri

Binomial name
- Apona ligustri Mell, 1929

Species of moth

Apona ligustri is a moth in the family Eupterotidae. It was described by Rudolf Mell in 1929. It is found in China.
