= Eupterote kageri =

Scientific classification
- Kingdom: Animalia
- Phylum: Arthropoda
- Clade: Pancrustacea
- Class: Insecta
- Order: Lepidoptera
- Family: Eupterotidae
- Genus: Eupterote
- Species: E. kageri

Binomial name
- Eupterote kageri Nässig, 1989

Species of moth

Eupterote kageri is a moth in the family Eupterotidae. It was described by Wolfgang A. Nässig in 1989. It is found on Sumatra.
