= Melanothrix latevittata =

Scientific classification
- Kingdom: Animalia
- Phylum: Arthropoda
- Class: Insecta
- Order: Lepidoptera
- Family: Eupterotidae
- Genus: Melanothrix
- Species: M. latevittata

Binomial name
- Melanothrix latevittata Grünberg, 1914

Species of moth

Melanothrix latevittata is a moth in the family Eupterotidae. It was described by Karl Grünberg in 1914. It is found on Borneo. The habitat consists of upper montane forests.
