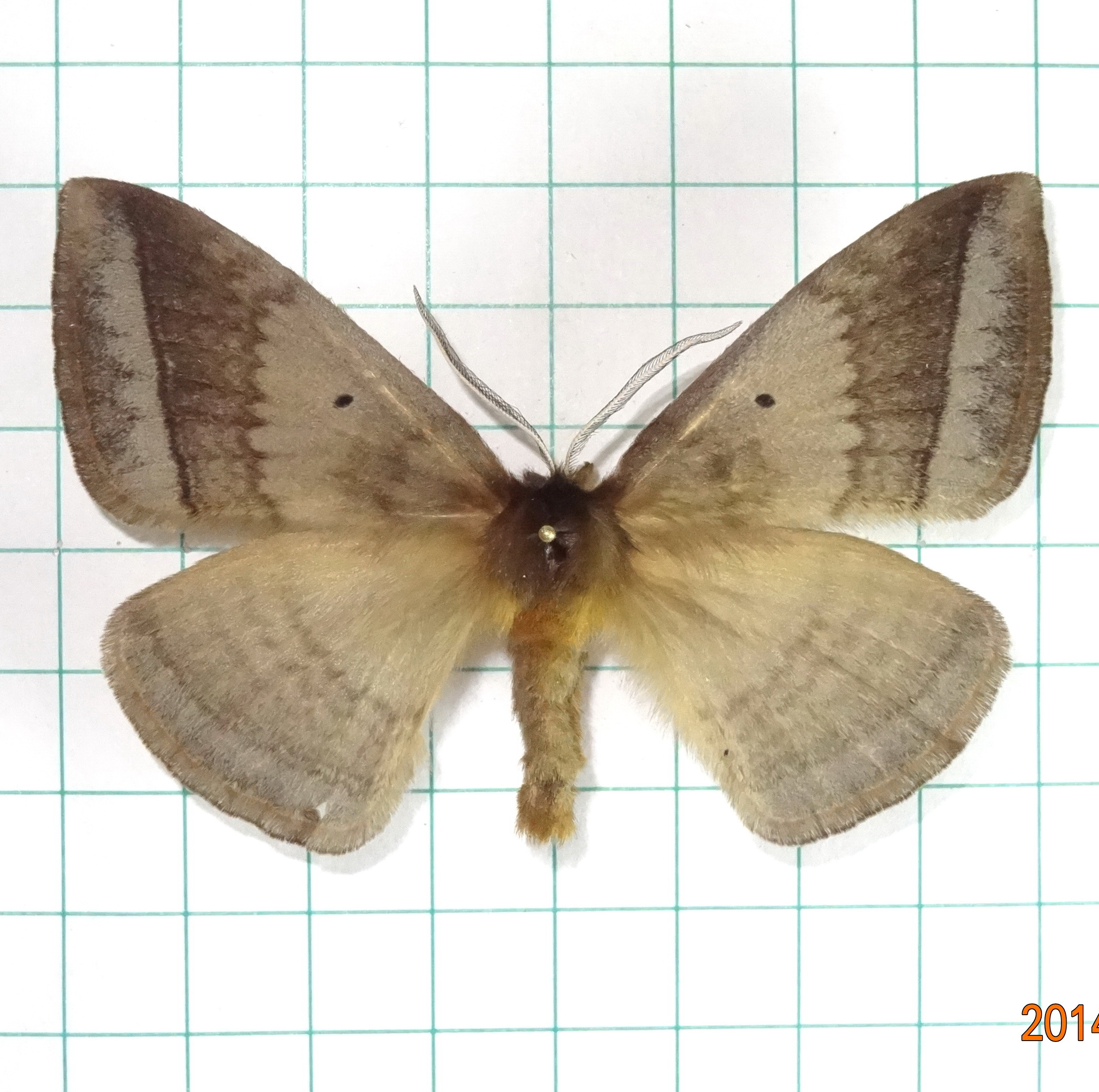

Scientific classification
- Kingdom: Animalia
- Phylum: Arthropoda
- Class: Insecta
- Order: Lepidoptera
- Family: Eupterotidae
- Genus: Apona
- Species: A. fuliginosa

Binomial name
- Apona fuliginosa Kishida, 1993

= Apona fuliginosa =

Species of moth

Apona fuliginosa is a moth in the family Eupterotidae. It was described by Yasunori Kishida in 1993. It is found in Taiwan.

The wingspan is 54 mm for males and 67 mm for females. The forewings are greyish fuscous, with the median and subterminal areas pale greyish. The hindwings are greyish ocher, with five inconspicuous transverse lines. The type locality is Dayuling, Hualien, and the holotype and paratype specimens are stored in the National Museum of Nature and Science, Japan.

This species is distributed in the mountainous areas of Taiwan at elevations of 2,100 to 2,500 meters above sea level. The adult moths are only found from October to December. The antennae of male and female adults of this species are more developed than other species in the family Erebidae found in Taiwan. Currently, there are no records of the larval stage.
