= Melanothrix fumosa =

Scientific classification
- Kingdom: Animalia
- Phylum: Arthropoda
- Class: Insecta
- Order: Lepidoptera
- Family: Eupterotidae
- Genus: Melanothrix
- Species: M. fumosa

Binomial name
- Melanothrix fumosa Swinhoe, 1905

Synonyms
- Melanothrix xanthomelas Strand, 1924

Species of moth

Melanothrix fumosa is a moth in the family Eupterotidae. It was described by Swinhoe in 1905. It is found on Borneo.

Adult males have a complete white bar on the forewings, while females have an extensive yellow area on each wing distally.
