= Papuapterote crenulata =

Scientific classification
- Kingdom: Animalia
- Phylum: Arthropoda
- Class: Insecta
- Order: Lepidoptera
- Family: Eupterotidae
- Genus: Papuapterote
- Species: P. crenulata

Binomial name
- Papuapterote crenulata (Joicey & Talbot, 1916)

Synonyms
- Eupterote crenulata Joicey & Talbot, 1916

Species of moth

Papuapterote crenulata is a moth in the family Eupterotidae. It was described by James John Joicey and George Talbot in 1916. It is found on New Guinea.

The length of the forewings is about 46 mm. The forewings are pale brown, entirely suffused with black scaling, more so at the costa. There is a curved black basal line from the costa to the inner margin and a faint dark band crossing the cell from the costa to the inner margin, its outer edge crenulate (scolloped). There are two dark and faint narrow crenulate discal bands beyond the cell and there is a heavily marked waved submarginal black line, separated by the ground colour from a dark marginal band. The hindwings are pale brown with a wide dark marginal area of sparse black scaling. A well-marked dark and waved line crosses the wing from before the apex to the inner margin.
