= Ganisa floresiaca =

Scientific classification
- Kingdom: Animalia
- Phylum: Arthropoda
- Class: Insecta
- Order: Lepidoptera
- Family: Eupterotidae
- Genus: Ganisa
- Species: G. floresiaca

Binomial name
- Ganisa floresiaca Nässig, 2009

Species of moth

Ganisa floresiaca is a moth in the family Eupterotidae. It was described by Wolfgang A. Nässig in 2009. It is found on Flores in Indonesia. Adults have been recorded on wing from February to April.
