= Ganisa longipennata =

Scientific classification
- Kingdom: Animalia
- Phylum: Arthropoda
- Class: Insecta
- Order: Lepidoptera
- Family: Eupterotidae
- Genus: Ganisa
- Species: G. longipennata

Binomial name
- Ganisa longipennata Mell, 1958

Species of moth

Ganisa longipennata is a moth in the family Eupterotidae. It is found in China.
