= Eupterote epicharis =

Scientific classification
- Kingdom: Animalia
- Phylum: Arthropoda
- Clade: Pancrustacea
- Class: Insecta
- Order: Lepidoptera
- Family: Eupterotidae
- Genus: Eupterote
- Species: E. epicharis

Binomial name
- Eupterote epicharis West, 1932

Species of moth

Eupterote epicharis is a moth in the family Eupterotidae. It was described by West in 1932. It is found in the Philippines.
