= Eupterote kalliesi =

Scientific classification
- Kingdom: Animalia
- Phylum: Arthropoda
- Clade: Pancrustacea
- Class: Insecta
- Order: Lepidoptera
- Family: Eupterotidae
- Genus: Eupterote
- Species: E. kalliesi

Binomial name
- Eupterote kalliesi Nässig, 2000

Species of moth

Eupterote kalliesi is a moth of the family Eupterotidae. It is found in Sumatra in an altitudinal range of 2100-2600m.

The length of its forewings is 35mm, the antennae 12 mm long, blackish and bipectinated.

== Etymology ==
The species was named after its collector A. Kallies.
