= Eupterote minor =

Scientific classification
- Kingdom: Animalia
- Phylum: Arthropoda
- Clade: Pancrustacea
- Class: Insecta
- Order: Lepidoptera
- Family: Eupterotidae
- Genus: Eupterote
- Species: E. minor

Binomial name
- Eupterote minor Moore, 1893

Species of moth

Eupterote minor is a moth in the family Eupterotidae. It was described by Frederic Moore in 1893. It is found in Myanmar.

The wingspan is 46–55 mm. Adults are similar to Eupterote geminata, but the two lines of the forewings are more erect and curved below the costa, while the two lines of the hindwings are more curved and less oblique. The colour varies from pale dull ochreous to pale reddish, the latter with traces of the submarginal line on both wings.
