= Eupterote radiata =

Scientific classification
- Kingdom: Animalia
- Phylum: Arthropoda
- Clade: Pancrustacea
- Class: Insecta
- Order: Lepidoptera
- Family: Eupterotidae
- Genus: Eupterote
- Species: E. radiata

Binomial name
- Eupterote radiata (Walker, 1866)

Synonyms
- Sarmalia radiata Walker, 1866

Species of moth

Eupterote radiata is a moth in the family Eupterotidae. It was described by Francis Walker in 1866. It is found on Luzon in the Philippines.
