= Eupterote rothschildi =

Scientific classification
- Kingdom: Animalia
- Phylum: Arthropoda
- Clade: Pancrustacea
- Class: Insecta
- Order: Lepidoptera
- Family: Eupterotidae
- Genus: Eupterote
- Species: E. rothschildi

Binomial name
- Eupterote rothschildi (Strand, 1924)

Synonyms
- Tagora pallida Rothschild, 1917 (preocc.); Tagora rothschildi Strand, 1924

Species of moth

Eupterote rothschildi is a moth in the family Eupterotidae. It was described by Embrik Strand in 1924. It is found in India.

The wingspan is about 134 mm. The forewings are greyish-cream-white suffused and freckled with cinnamon grey. There is a darker outwardly curved subbasal band and a sharply angled antemedian band just touching a vitreous patch, beyond this patch are three rather indistinct bands of darker coalescent lunate marks. The transverse band from the apex to the inner margin is much more basad and much more defined, also straighter and the submarginal cloud band is much fainter. The hindwings are similar, but only with one antemedian band and a brown and straight postmedian band.
