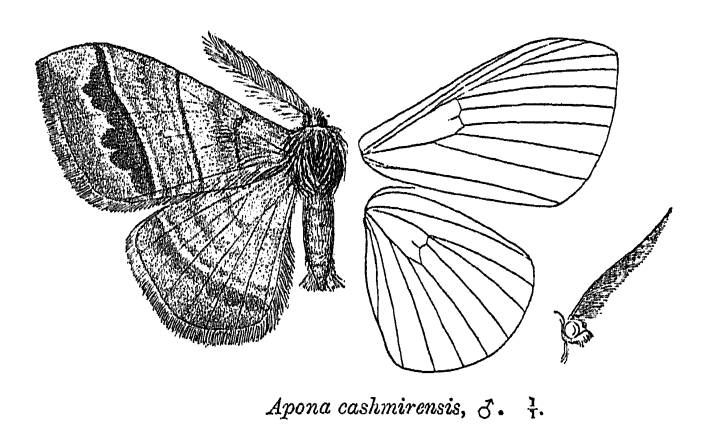
- Apona Cahsmirensis

Scientific classification
- Kingdom: Animalia
- Phylum: Arthropoda
- Class: Insecta
- Order: Lepidoptera
- Family: Eupterotidae
- Genus: Apona; Walker, 1856

= Apona =

Genus of moths

Apona is a genus of moths in the family Eupterotidae.

== Species ==
- Apona caschmirensis Kollar, 1844
- Apona frater Rothschild, 1917
- Apona fuliginosa Kishida, 1993
- Apona ligustri Mell, 1929
- Apona mandarina Leech, 1898
- Apona plumosa Moore, 1872
- Apona ronaldi Bethune-Baker, 1927
- Apona shevaroyensis Moore, 1884
- Apona yunnanensis Mell, 1929

== Status unknown ==
- Apona chasiana Swinhoe

== Former species ==
- Apona styx Bethune-Baker, 1908
