= Palirisa taipeishanis =

Scientific classification
- Kingdom: Animalia
- Phylum: Arthropoda
- Class: Insecta
- Order: Lepidoptera
- Family: Eupterotidae
- Genus: Palirisa
- Species: P. taipeishanis

Binomial name
- Palirisa taipeishanis Mell, 1937

Species of moth

Palirisa taipeishanis is a moth in the family Eupterotidae. It was described by Rudolf Mell in 1937. It is found in Shaanxi, China.
