= Eupterote asclepiades =

Scientific classification
- Kingdom: Animalia
- Phylum: Arthropoda
- Clade: Pancrustacea
- Class: Insecta
- Order: Lepidoptera
- Family: Eupterotidae
- Genus: Eupterote
- Species: E. asclepiades

Binomial name
- Eupterote asclepiades (Felder, 1874)

Synonyms
- Sphingognatha asclepiades Felder, 1874

Species of moth

Eupterote asclepiades is a moth in the family Eupterotidae. It was described by Swinhoe in 1894. It is found in Sundaland. The habitat consist of lowland rainforests, including hill dipterocarp forests.

The larvae are polyphagous.
