= Palirisa archivicina =

Scientific classification
- Kingdom: Animalia
- Phylum: Arthropoda
- Class: Insecta
- Order: Lepidoptera
- Family: Eupterotidae
- Genus: Palirisa
- Species: P. archivicina

Binomial name
- Palirisa archivicina Bryk, 1944

Species of moth

Palirisa archivicina is a moth in the family Eupterotidae. It was described by Felix Bryk in 1944. It is found in Myanmar.
