= Apona yunnanensis =

Scientific classification
- Kingdom: Animalia
- Phylum: Arthropoda
- Class: Insecta
- Order: Lepidoptera
- Family: Eupterotidae
- Genus: Apona
- Species: A. yunnanensis

Binomial name
- Apona yunnanensis Mell, 1929

Species of moth

Apona yunnanensis is a moth in the family Eupterotidae. It was described by Rudolf Mell in 1929. It is found in China.

== Subspecies ==
- Apona yunnanensis yunnanensis
- Apona yunnanensis alticola Mell, 1937 (China: Yunnan)
