= Patulognatha murina =

Scientific classification
- Kingdom: Animalia
- Phylum: Arthropoda
- Class: Insecta
- Order: Lepidoptera
- Family: Eupterotidae
- Genus: Eupterote
- Species: E. murina

Binomial name
- Eupterote murina (Moore, 1877)

Synonyms
- Tagora murina Moore, 1877; Eupterote murina Moore, 1877

Species of moth

Patulognatha murina is a moth in the family Eupterotidae. It was described by Frederic Moore in 1877. It is found in Sri Lanka. The genus name was revised in 2024 and currently included in the endemic genus Patulognatha.

The wingspan is 84–94 mm. Adults are greyish red-brown, the forewings with four indistinct antemedial lines and without a hyaline (glass-like) speck at the end of the cell. There are five waved postmedial lines, the innermost nearly meeting the outermost antemedial line on the disk. The postmedial straight line is double and distinct and the area between it and the outer waved line is suffused with grey. The hindwings have four or five waved lines before the straight double line, which is some way beyond the middle. The waved outer line is located near the margin, the area beyond it suffused with grey.
