= Eupterote obsoleta =

Scientific classification
- Kingdom: Animalia
- Phylum: Arthropoda
- Clade: Pancrustacea
- Class: Insecta
- Order: Lepidoptera
- Family: Eupterotidae
- Genus: Eupterote
- Species: E. obsoleta

Binomial name
- Eupterote obsoleta (Talbot, 1926)

Synonyms
- Tagora glaucescens obsoleta Talbot, 1926

Species of moth

Eupterote obsoleta is a moth in the family Eupterotidae. It was described by George Talbot in 1926. It is found on Borneo. The habitat consists of lowland limestone forests.

Adults are reddish brown.
