= Eupterote flavicollis =

Scientific classification
- Kingdom: Animalia
- Phylum: Arthropoda
- Clade: Pancrustacea
- Class: Insecta
- Order: Lepidoptera
- Family: Eupterotidae
- Genus: Eupterote
- Species: E. flavicollis

Binomial name
- Eupterote flavicollis Guérin-Méneville, 1843

Synonyms
- Bombyx collaris Guérin-Méneville, 1843; Bombyx adolphaei Guérin-Méneville, 1843

Species of moth

Eupterote flavicollis is a moth in the family Eupterotidae. It was described by Félix Édouard Guérin-Méneville in 1843. It is found in India.

The wingspan is 60–75 mm (2.4–3.0 in). Adults are similar to Eupterote mollifera, but the thorax is red brown. The forewings have five or six waved lines before the postmedial line, which is curved and the grey spots take the form of a complete waved band and are further from the postmedial line. Between the line and grey band is a conjoined series of dark spots, those towards the inner margin largest. The hindwings have a single postmedial curved line, and sometimes medial and outer lines.
