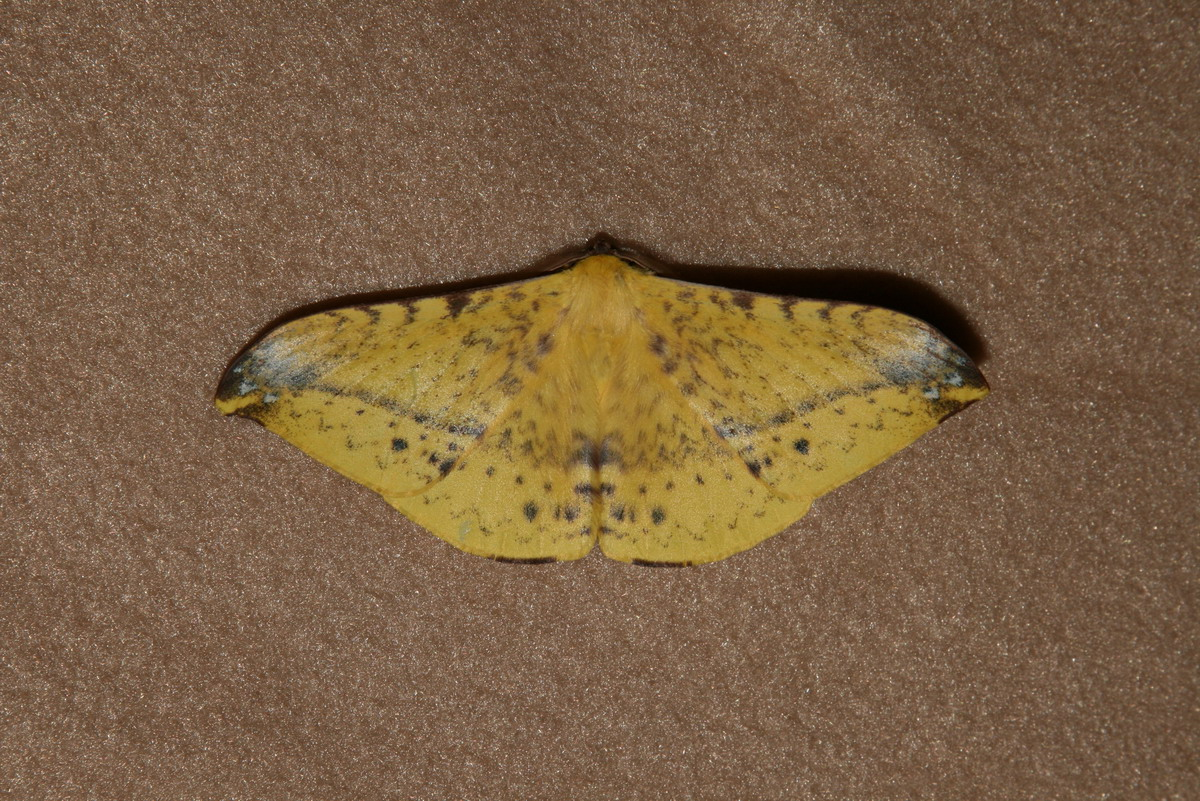
- From Malaysia

Scientific classification
- Kingdom: Animalia
- Phylum: Arthropoda
- Clade: Pancrustacea
- Class: Insecta
- Order: Lepidoptera
- Family: Eupterotidae
- Genus: Eupterote
- Species: E. naessigi

Binomial name
- Eupterote naessigi Holloway, 1987

= Eupterote naessigi =

Species of moth

Eupterote naessigi is a moth in the family Eupterotidae. It was described by Jeremy Daniel Holloway in 1987. It is found on Borneo, Sumatra and Peninsular Malaysia. The habitat consists of lowland rainforests and mangrove areas.

The wingspan is 50–55 mm for males and 58 mm for females.

The larvae have been recorded feeding on Cassia species.
