= Papuapterote =

Scientific classification
- Kingdom: Animalia
- Phylum: Arthropoda
- Class: Insecta
- Order: Lepidoptera
- Family: Eupterotidae
- Genus: Papuapterote; Nässig & Oberprieler, 2008

Genus of moths

Papuapterote is a genus of moths in the family Eupterotidae.

== Species ==
- Papuapterote crenulata (Joicey & Talbot, 1916)
- Papuapterote punctata (Joicey & Talbot, 1916)
- Papuapterote styx (Bethune-Baker, 1908)
