= Eupterote petola =

Scientific classification
- Kingdom: Animalia
- Phylum: Arthropoda
- Clade: Pancrustacea
- Class: Insecta
- Order: Lepidoptera
- Family: Eupterotidae
- Genus: Eupterote
- Species: E. petola

Binomial name
- Eupterote petola (Moore, 1860)

Synonyms
- Dreata petola Moore, 1860

Species of moth

Eupterote petola is a moth in the family Eupterotidae. It was described by Frederic Moore in 1860. It is found on Java in Indonesia.

The wingspan is 60–65 mm for males and 65–70 mm for females.
