= Eupterote translata =

Scientific classification
- Kingdom: Animalia
- Phylum: Arthropoda
- Clade: Pancrustacea
- Class: Insecta
- Order: Lepidoptera
- Family: Eupterotidae
- Genus: Eupterote
- Species: E. translata

Binomial name
- Eupterote translata C. Swinhoe, 1885

Species of moth

Eupterote translata is a moth in the family Eupterotidae. It was described by Charles Swinhoe in 1885. It is found in India.

The wingspan is about 54 mm. Adults are similar to Eupterote testacea, but are pale ochreous brown and the antemedial, medial and postmedial lines on the forewings are indistinct. The single postmedial line is prominent and the submarginal line is nearer to the margin than in E. testacea. The hindwings are without the antemedial line and the postmedial line is single and straighter, while the submarginal line is better defined.
