= Nisaga rufescens =

Scientific classification
- Kingdom: Animalia
- Phylum: Arthropoda
- Clade: Pancrustacea
- Class: Insecta
- Order: Lepidoptera
- Family: Eupterotidae
- Genus: Nisaga
- Species: N. rufescens

Binomial name
- Nisaga rufescens Hampson, 1895

Species of moth

Nisaga rufescens is a moth in the family Eupterotidae. It was described by George Hampson in 1895. It is found in India.

The wingspan is about 50 mm (2.0 in).
