= Eupterote liquidambaris =

Scientific classification
- Kingdom: Animalia
- Phylum: Arthropoda
- Clade: Pancrustacea
- Class: Insecta
- Order: Lepidoptera
- Family: Eupterotidae
- Genus: Eupterote
- Species: E. liquidambaris

Binomial name
- Eupterote liquidambaris Mell, 1930

Species of moth

Eupterote liquidambaris is a moth in the family Eupterotidae. It was described by Rudolf Mell in 1930. It is found in China.
