= Pseudojana roepkei =

Scientific classification
- Kingdom: Animalia
- Phylum: Arthropoda
- Class: Insecta
- Order: Lepidoptera
- Family: Eupterotidae
- Genus: Pseudojana
- Species: P. roepkei

Binomial name
- Pseudojana roepkei Nieuwenhuis, 1948

Species of moth

Pseudojana roepkei is a moth in the family Eupterotidae. It was described by Nieuwenhuis in 1948. It is found on Sulawesi.
