= Eupterote vialis =

Scientific classification
- Kingdom: Animalia
- Phylum: Arthropoda
- Clade: Pancrustacea
- Class: Insecta
- Order: Lepidoptera
- Family: Eupterotidae
- Genus: Eupterote
- Species: E. vialis

Binomial name
- Eupterote vialis Moore, 1879

Species of moth

Eupterote vialis is a moth in the family Eupterotidae. It was described by Frederic Moore in 1879. It is found in Sri Lanka.

The wingspan is about 71 mm. Adults are similar to Eupterote plumipes, but the hairs of the thorax are tipped with yellow and the forewings are without the medial and submarginal lines and the oblique band is inwardly dark brown and outwardly yellow.
