= Eupterote pallida =

Scientific classification
- Kingdom: Animalia
- Phylum: Arthropoda
- Clade: Pancrustacea
- Class: Insecta
- Order: Lepidoptera
- Family: Eupterotidae
- Genus: Eupterote
- Species: E. pallida

Binomial name
- Eupterote pallida (Walker, 1855)

Synonyms
- Tagora pallida Walker, 1855

Species of moth

Eupterote pallida is a moth in the family Eupterotidae. It was described by Francis Walker in 1855. It is found in India.

The wingspan is 120–180 mm. Adults are similar to Eupterote patula, but can be distinguished by the dark red-brown head and the dark tuft on the basal joint of the antennae. The forewings are without a hyaline (glass-like) spot and there are two medial waved lines that are distant at the costa and inner margin and nearly meet at the middle. The double postmedial lines of both wings are dark, narrow, nearer together and less curved.
