= Eupterote diffusa =

Scientific classification
- Kingdom: Animalia
- Phylum: Arthropoda
- Clade: Pancrustacea
- Class: Insecta
- Order: Lepidoptera
- Family: Eupterotidae
- Genus: Eupterote
- Species: E. diffusa

Binomial name
- Eupterote diffusa Walker, 1865

Synonyms
- Eupterote primularis Moore, 1884

Species of moth

Eupterote diffusa is a moth in the family Eupterotidae. It was described by Francis Walker in 1865. It is found in India and Sri Lanka.

The wingspan is 58–66 mm. Adults are similar to Eupterote mollifera. The wings vary in colour from greyish white to dull ochreous brown or pale primrose yellow. The postmedial line is single, curved on both wings and much nearer to the margin than in E. mollifera. The waved lines are fairly distinct or obsolescent, as are the spots and outer waved line.
