= Eupterote weberi =

Scientific classification
- Kingdom: Animalia
- Phylum: Arthropoda
- Clade: Pancrustacea
- Class: Insecta
- Order: Lepidoptera
- Family: Eupterotidae
- Genus: Eupterote
- Species: E. weberi

Binomial name
- Eupterote weberi (Holloway, 1976)

Synonyms
- Tagora weberi Holloway, 1976

Species of moth

Eupterote weberi is a moth in the family Eupterotidae. It was described by Jeremy Daniel Holloway in 1976. It is found in Malaysia.
