= Eupterote decolorata =

Scientific classification
- Kingdom: Animalia
- Phylum: Arthropoda
- Clade: Pancrustacea
- Class: Insecta
- Order: Lepidoptera
- Family: Eupterotidae
- Genus: Eupterote
- Species: E. decolorata

Binomial name
- Eupterote decolorata (Grünberg, 1914)

Synonyms
- Sarmalia decolorata Grünberg, 1914

Species of moth

Eupterote decolorata is a moth in the family Eupterotidae. It was described by Karl Grünberg in 1914. It is found in Assam, India.
