= Eupterote chinensis =

Scientific classification
- Kingdom: Animalia
- Phylum: Arthropoda
- Clade: Pancrustacea
- Class: Insecta
- Order: Lepidoptera
- Family: Eupterotidae
- Genus: Eupterote
- Species: E. chinensis

Binomial name
- Eupterote chinensis Leech, 1898

Species of moth

Eupterote chinensis is a moth in the family Eupterotidae. It was described by John Henry Leech in 1898. It is found in Myanmar, Laos and Thailand.
