= Apona ronaldi =

Scientific classification
- Kingdom: Animalia
- Phylum: Arthropoda
- Class: Insecta
- Order: Lepidoptera
- Family: Eupterotidae
- Genus: Apona
- Species: A. ronaldi

Binomial name
- Apona ronaldi Bethune-Baker, 1927

Species of moth

Apona ronaldi is a moth in the family Eupterotidae. It was described by George Thomas Bethune-Baker in 1927. It is found in China.

The wingspan is about 90 mm. Both wings are greyish brown, the forewings with a restricted darker basal area, ending obliquely and abruptly. There is a dark triangular spot at the end of the cell and a pair of fine, curved, parallel, dark median lines, which are carried through the hindwings. There is also a pair of waved similar postmedian lines with a pale interspace. From this point, the veins are darkly outlined and there is a good deal of dark suffusion. The hindwings also have a postmedian curved and waved dark line.
