= Eupterote udiana =

Scientific classification
- Kingdom: Animalia
- Phylum: Arthropoda
- Clade: Pancrustacea
- Class: Insecta
- Order: Lepidoptera
- Family: Eupterotidae
- Genus: Eupterote
- Species: E. udiana

Binomial name
- Eupterote udiana Moore, 1860

Species of moth

Eupterote udiana is a moth in the family Eupterotidae. It was described by Frederic Moore in 1860. It is found on Java in Indonesia.
