= Eupterote balwanti =

Scientific classification
- Kingdom: Animalia
- Phylum: Arthropoda
- Clade: Pancrustacea
- Class: Insecta
- Order: Lepidoptera
- Family: Eupterotidae
- Genus: Eupterote
- Species: E. balwanti

Binomial name
- Eupterote balwanti Bhasin, 1946

Species of moth

Eupterote balwanti is a moth in the family Eupterotidae. It was described by Bhasin in 1946. It is found in India
