= Eupterote muluana =

Scientific classification
- Kingdom: Animalia
- Phylum: Arthropoda
- Clade: Pancrustacea
- Class: Insecta
- Order: Lepidoptera
- Family: Eupterotidae
- Genus: Eupterote
- Species: E. muluana

Binomial name
- Eupterote muluana Holloway, 1987

Species of moth

Eupterote muluana is a moth in the family Eupterotidae. It was described by Jeremy Daniel Holloway in 1987 and is found on Borneo. Its habitat consists of upper montane forests.
