= Eupterote dulcinea =

Scientific classification
- Kingdom: Animalia
- Phylum: Arthropoda
- Clade: Pancrustacea
- Class: Insecta
- Order: Lepidoptera
- Family: Eupterotidae
- Genus: Eupterote
- Species: E. dulcinea

Binomial name
- Eupterote dulcinea C. Swinhoe, 1901

Species of moth

Eupterote dulcinea is a moth in the family Eupterotidae. It was described by Charles Swinhoe in 1901. It is found on Selayar Island, south of Sulawesi.

Adult males are bright chrome yellow, the antenna, head, thorax and outer portions of the wings are slightly darker than the general colour and with a faint indication of a straight discal line on the hindwings, but otherwise absolutely without markings. Females are dark chrome yellow, absolutely without markings.
