= Pseudojana vitalisi =

Scientific classification
- Kingdom: Animalia
- Phylum: Arthropoda
- Class: Insecta
- Order: Lepidoptera
- Family: Eupterotidae
- Genus: Pseudojana
- Species: P. vitalisi

Binomial name
- Pseudojana vitalisi L. Candèze, 1927

Species of moth

Pseudojana vitalisi is a moth in the family Eupterotidae. It was described by L. Candèze in 1927. It is found in South-East Asia.
