= Pseudojana pallidipennis =

Scientific classification
- Kingdom: Animalia
- Phylum: Arthropoda
- Clade: Pancrustacea
- Class: Insecta
- Order: Lepidoptera
- Family: Eupterotidae
- Genus: Pseudojana
- Species: P. pallidipennis

Binomial name
- Pseudojana pallidipennis Hampson, 1895

Synonyms
- Pseudojana grandis Rothschild, 1917

Species of moth

Pseudojana pallidipennis is a moth in the family Eupterotidae. It was described by George Hampson in 1895. It is found in Myanmar and the north-eastern Himalayas.

== Description ==
The wingspan is about 130 mm. Adults are pale ochreous brown irrorated (sprinkled) with fuscous, the forewings with slight dark suffusion from the base through the cell and extending as dentate dark marks along the subcostal and median nervules. There is an oblique fuscous line from the costa near the apex to the middle of the inner margin, with three lines on a brownish ground colour beyond it, then two other lines. There is a series of fuscous specks from the apex on a slight band of fuscous suffusion and a submarginal series of black specks connected by traces of a crenulate line. The hindwings have an antemedial oblique diffused fuscous line followed by five lines, then a diffused fuscous band and a submarginal series of fuscous specks.
