= Melanothrix sanchezi =

Scientific classification
- Kingdom: Animalia
- Phylum: Arthropoda
- Class: Insecta
- Order: Lepidoptera
- Family: Eupterotidae
- Genus: Melanothrix
- Species: M. sanchezi

Binomial name
- Melanothrix sanchezi Schultze, 1925

Synonyms
- Melanothrix nymphaliaria sanchezi Schultze, 1925; Melanothrix nymphaliaria var. baletana Schultze, 1925

Species of moth

Melanothrix sanchezi is a moth in the family Eupterotidae. It was described by Schultze in 1925. It is found in the Philippines.
