= Eupterote alba =

Scientific classification
- Kingdom: Animalia
- Phylum: Arthropoda
- Clade: Pancrustacea
- Class: Insecta
- Order: Lepidoptera
- Family: Eupterotidae
- Genus: Eupterote
- Species: E. alba

Binomial name
- Eupterote alba (C. Swinhoe, 1892)

Synonyms
- Sarmalia alba C. Swinhoe, 1892

Species of moth

Eupterote alba is a moth in the family Eupterotidae. It was described by Charles Swinhoe in 1892. It is found on Luzon in the Philippines.
