= Eupterote flavida =

Scientific classification
- Kingdom: Animalia
- Phylum: Arthropoda
- Clade: Pancrustacea
- Class: Insecta
- Order: Lepidoptera
- Family: Eupterotidae
- Genus: Eupterote
- Species: E. flavida

Binomial name
- Eupterote flavida Moore, 1884

Synonyms
- Messata acinea Swinhoe, 1891; Eupterote procumbens Grünberg

Species of moth

Eupterote flavida is a moth in the family Eupterotidae. It was described by Frederic Moore in 1884. It is found in India.

The wingspan is about 74 mm. The ground colour is yellow, with a slight ruddy tinge. The forewings are crossed by three slightly curved oblique bands of blackish scales from near the apex to the inner margin, towards which they diverge. The middle band is often obsolete.
