= Eupterote plumipes =

Scientific classification
- Kingdom: Animalia
- Phylum: Arthropoda
- Clade: Pancrustacea
- Class: Insecta
- Order: Lepidoptera
- Family: Eupterotidae
- Genus: Eupterote
- Species: E. plumipes

Binomial name
- Eupterote plumipes (Walker, 1855)

Synonyms
- Dreata plumipes Walker, 1855; Messaga rubiginosa Walker, 1855; Messata quadrifasciata Moore, 1879

Species of moth

Eupterote plumipes is a moth in the family Eupterotidae. It was described by Francis Walker in 1855. It is found in Sri Lanka.

The wingspan is 74–70 mm. There are three indistinct waved medial bands on the forewings, as well as an oblique dark band from the apex to the centre of the inner margin and a submarginal indistinct band. The hindwings have traces of medial and submarginal bands. The ground colour is reddish brown in males and very dark vinous brown in females. The form quadrifasciata is brownish ochreous.

The Global Lepidoptera Names Index has this name as a synonym of Eupterote orientalis.
