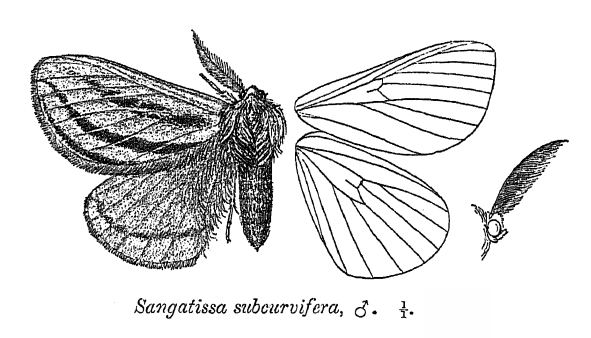

Scientific classification
- Kingdom: Animalia
- Phylum: Arthropoda
- Clade: Pancrustacea
- Class: Insecta
- Order: Lepidoptera
- Family: Eupterotidae
- Genus: Eupterote
- Species: E. subcurvifera

Binomial name
- Eupterote subcurvifera (Walker, 1865)

Synonyms
- Dreata subcurvifera Walker, 1865; Sangatissa subcurvifera

= Eupterote subcurvifera =

Species of moth

Eupterote subcurvifera is a moth in the family Eupterotidae. It was described by Francis Walker in 1865. It is found in India and Sri Lanka.

Body segments of male are pale brown. Wings are whitish brown. Forewings with three blackish curved bands, where one runs from base to near apex, one runs from base of inner margin to apex and the other on outer margin. Hindwing with sub-marginal and marginal bands. All these bands are interrupted at the veins.

Female is much browner.
