= Pandala =

Scientific classification
- Kingdom: Animalia
- Phylum: Arthropoda
- Class: Insecta
- Order: Lepidoptera
- Family: Eupterotidae
- Subfamily: Eupterotinae
- Genus: Pandala; Walker, 1855
- Species: P. dolosa

Binomial name
- Pandala dolosa Walker, 1855

Genus of moths

Pandala is a monotypic moth genus in the family Eupterotidae described by Francis Walker in 1855. Its single species, Pandala dolosa, described by the same author in the same year, is found in Sri Lanka.

Adults are brown, the wings with several darker brown, slightly oblique, zigzag bands. Hindwings have four waved postmedial lines and a curved submarginal line.
