= Dreata =

Scientific classification
- Kingdom: Animalia
- Phylum: Arthropoda
- Class: Insecta
- Order: Lepidoptera
- Family: Eupterotidae
- Subfamily: Eupterotinae
- Genus: Dreata; Walker, 1855
- Species: D. hades

Binomial name
- Dreata hades Walker, 1855

Synonyms
- Drexta Kirby, 1892

Genus of moths

Dreata is a monotypic moth genus in the family Eupterotidae described by Francis Walker in 1855. Its single species, Dreata hades, described by the same author in the same year, is found in Bangladesh, Myanmar and India.

The wingspan is about 72 mm. The forewings are mouse brown, with the medial area pale. There are five indistinct waved lines, a nearly straight and erect prominent postmedial line and a waved submarginal line. The hindwings are pale at the base, without the waved lines. The postmedial line is less prominent and there is a submarginal waved line.

Dreata yokoana Bethune-Baker, 1927 was once in this genus, but it is now named Jana yokoana.
