= Eupterote citheronia =

Scientific classification
- Kingdom: Animalia
- Phylum: Arthropoda
- Clade: Pancrustacea
- Class: Insecta
- Order: Lepidoptera
- Family: Eupterotidae
- Genus: Eupterote
- Species: E. citheronia

Binomial name
- Eupterote citheronia (Bryk, 1944)

Synonyms
- Drepanojana citheronia Bryk, 1944

Species of moth

Eupterote citheronia is a moth in the family Eupterotidae. It was described by Felix Bryk in 1944. It is found in Sri Lanka.
