= Eupterote =

- Eupterote asclepiades

Scientific classification
- Kingdom: Animalia
- Phylum: Arthropoda
- Class: Insecta
- Order: Lepidoptera
- Family: Eupterotidae
- Tribe: Eupterotini
- Genus: Eupterote; Hübner, 1820

Type species
- Phalaena fabia Cramer, 1780

Synonyms
- Messata Walker, 1855; Tagora Walker, 1855; Murlida Moore, [1860]; in Horsfield & Moore; Brachytera Felder, 1874; Sphingognatha Felder, 1874; Leptojana Butler, 1881; Pachyjana Butler, 1881; Horanpella Moore, 1883; Sangatissa Moore, 1883; Spalyria Moore, 1884; Mallarctus Mell, 1930; Drepanojana Bryk, 1944; Heringijana Bryk, 1944; Sarmalia Walker, 1866

Genus of moths

Eupterote is a genus of moths in the family Eupterotidae. It was first described by Jacob Hübner in 1820.

== Species ==
- Eupterote acesta Swinhoe, 1894
- Eupterote alba (Swinhoe, 1892)
- Eupterote amaena Walker, 1855
- Eupterote asclepiades (Felder, 1874)
- Eupterote balwanti Bhasin., 1946
- Eupterote calandra Swinhoe, 1894
- Eupterote celebica Nässig, Holloway & Beeke, 2011
- Eupterote chinensis Leech, 1898
- Eupterote citheronia Bryk, 1944
- Eupterote citrina Walker, 1855
- Eupterote crinita Swinhoe, 1899
- Eupterote decolorata (Grünberg, 1914)
- Eupterote diffusa Walker, 1865
- Eupterote dulcinea Swinhoe, 1901
- Eupterote epicharis West, 1932
- Eupterote fabia (Cramer, 1780)
- Eupterote flavicollis Guérin-Méneville, 1843
- Eupterote flavida Moore, 1884
- Eupterote formosana Matsumura, 1908
- Eupterote gardneri Bryk, 1950
- Eupterote geminata (Walker, 1855)
- Eupterote glaucescens (Walker, 1855)
- Eupterote harmani Holloway, 1987
- Eupterote hibisci Fabricius, 1775
- Eupterote kageri Nässig, 1989
- Eupterote kalliesi Nässig, 2000
- Eupterote lineosa Walker, 1855
- Eupterote liquidambaris Mell, 1930
- Eupterote minor Moore, 1893
- Eupterote mollifera Walker, 1865
- Eupterote multiarcuata Holloway, 1976
- Eupterote muluana Holloway, 1987
- Eupterote naessigi Holloway, 1987
- Eupterote nobilis (Bryk, 1944)
- Eupterote obsoleta (Talbot, 1926)
- Eupterote orientalis Fabricius
- Eupterote pallida (Walker, 1855)
- Eupterote pandya (Moore, [1866])
- Eupterote patula (Walker, 1855)
- Eupterote petola Moore, 1860
- Eupterote placida (Moore, [1883])
- Eupterote plumipes (Walker, 1855)
- Eupterote radiata (Walker, 1866)
- Eupterote rothschildi (Strand, 1924)
- Eupterote splendens Nässig & C.H. Schulze, 2007
- Eupterote subcurvifera (Walker, 1865)
- Eupterote testacea Walker, 1855
- Eupterote todara Moore, 1884
- Eupterote translata Swinhoe, 1885
- Eupterote udiana Moore, 1860
- Eupterote undans Walker, 1855
- Eupterote undata Blanchard, 1844
- Eupterote unicolor Hampson, 1891
- Eupterote vialis Moore, 1879
- Eupterote weberi (Holloway, 1976)

== Former species ==
- Eupterote collaris (Guérin-Méneville, 1843)
- Eupterote doddi Turner, 1911
- Eupterote expansa (Lucas, 1891)
- Eupterote jaresia Swinhoe, 1904
- Eupterote niassana (Rothschild, 1917)
- Eupterote punctata Joicey & Talbot, 1916
