= Melanothrix leucotrigona =

Scientific classification
- Kingdom: Animalia
- Phylum: Arthropoda
- Class: Insecta
- Order: Lepidoptera
- Family: Eupterotidae
- Genus: Melanothrix
- Species: M. leucotrigona

Binomial name
- Melanothrix leucotrigona Hampson, 1893

Synonyms
- Melanothrix nicevillei Hampson, 1896; Melanothrix intermedia Rothschild, 1917

Species of moth

Melanothrix leucotrigona is a moth in the family Eupterotidae. It was described by George Hampson in 1893. It is found in Myanmar, the Mergui Archipelago and Peninsular Malaysia.
