= Papuapterote styx =

Scientific classification
- Kingdom: Animalia
- Phylum: Arthropoda
- Class: Insecta
- Order: Lepidoptera
- Family: Eupterotidae
- Genus: Papuapterote
- Species: P. styx

Binomial name
- Papuapterote styx (Bethune-Baker, 1908)

Synonyms
- Eupterote styx Bethune-Baker, 1908; Apona styx

Species of moth

Papuapterote styx is a moth in the family Eupterotidae. It was described by George Thomas Bethune-Baker in 1908. It is found in New Guinea.

The wingspan is about 94 mm. The forewings are dark umber brown, with a very obscure trace of three or four darker bands across the centre of the wings and a subterminal slightly curved, dull ochreous darkly edged line. From here, there is a broad dark grey area with a scalloped external margin. The termen is dull ochreous brown. The hindwings are paler brown, with three or four obscure darker lines across the median area: a pale, darkly edged postmedian line, followed by a broad dark grey band with a scalloped external margin. The termen is dull ochreous brown.
