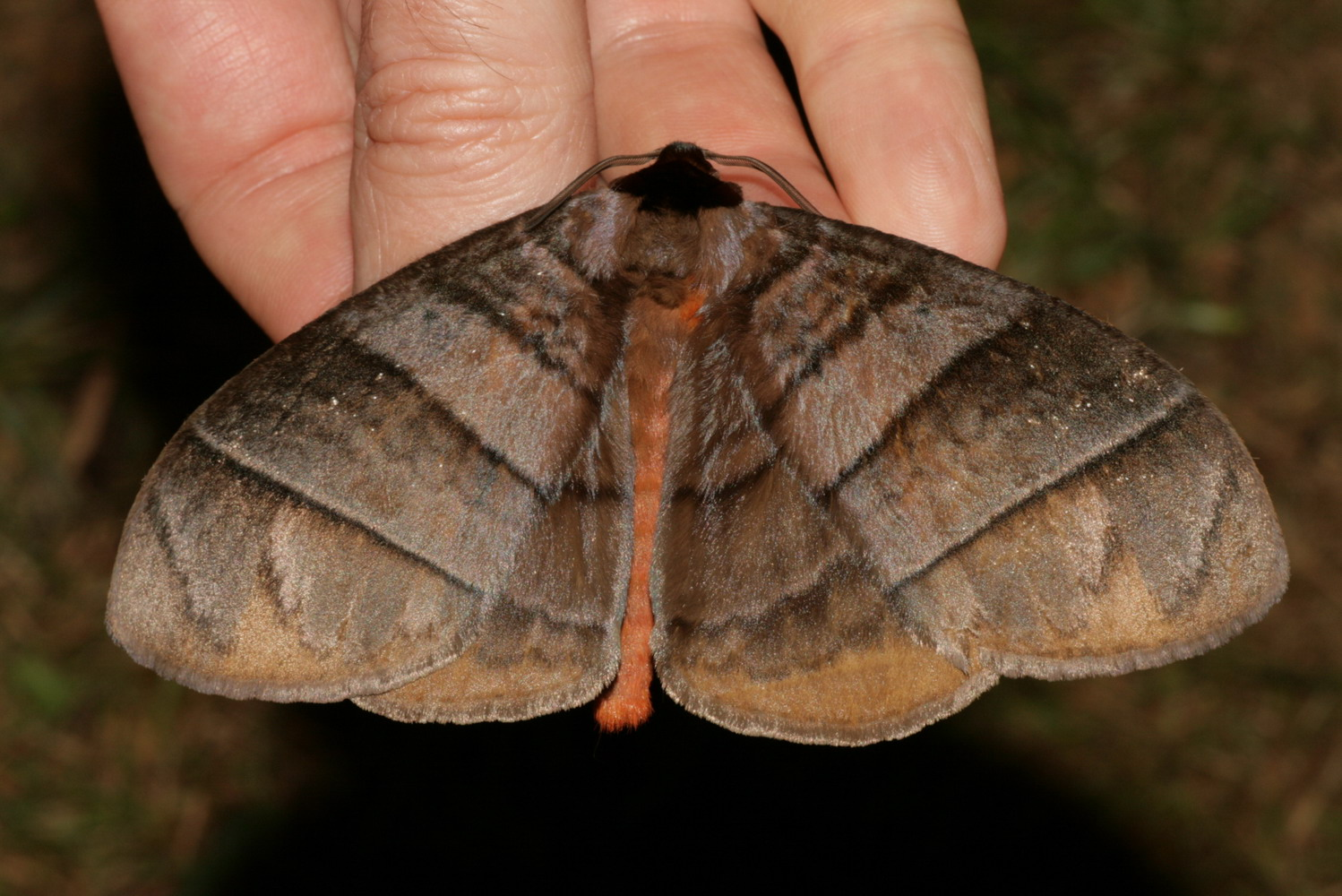

Scientific classification
- Kingdom: Animalia
- Phylum: Arthropoda
- Class: Insecta
- Order: Lepidoptera
- Family: Eupterotidae
- Genus: Pseudojana
- Species: P. perspicuifascia

Binomial name
- Pseudojana perspicuifascia Rothschild, 1917

= Pseudojana perspicuifascia =

Species of moth

Pseudojana perspicuifascia is a species of moth of the family Eupterotidae first described by Rothschild in 1917. It is found in Sundaland and on Nias.

The ground colour of the wings is dark red to purplish red. The forewings marked with a series of transverse, more or less straight fasciae.

== Subspecies ==
- Pseudojana perspicuifascia perspicuifascia
- Pseudojana perspicuifascia niassana Rothschild, 1917 (Nias)
