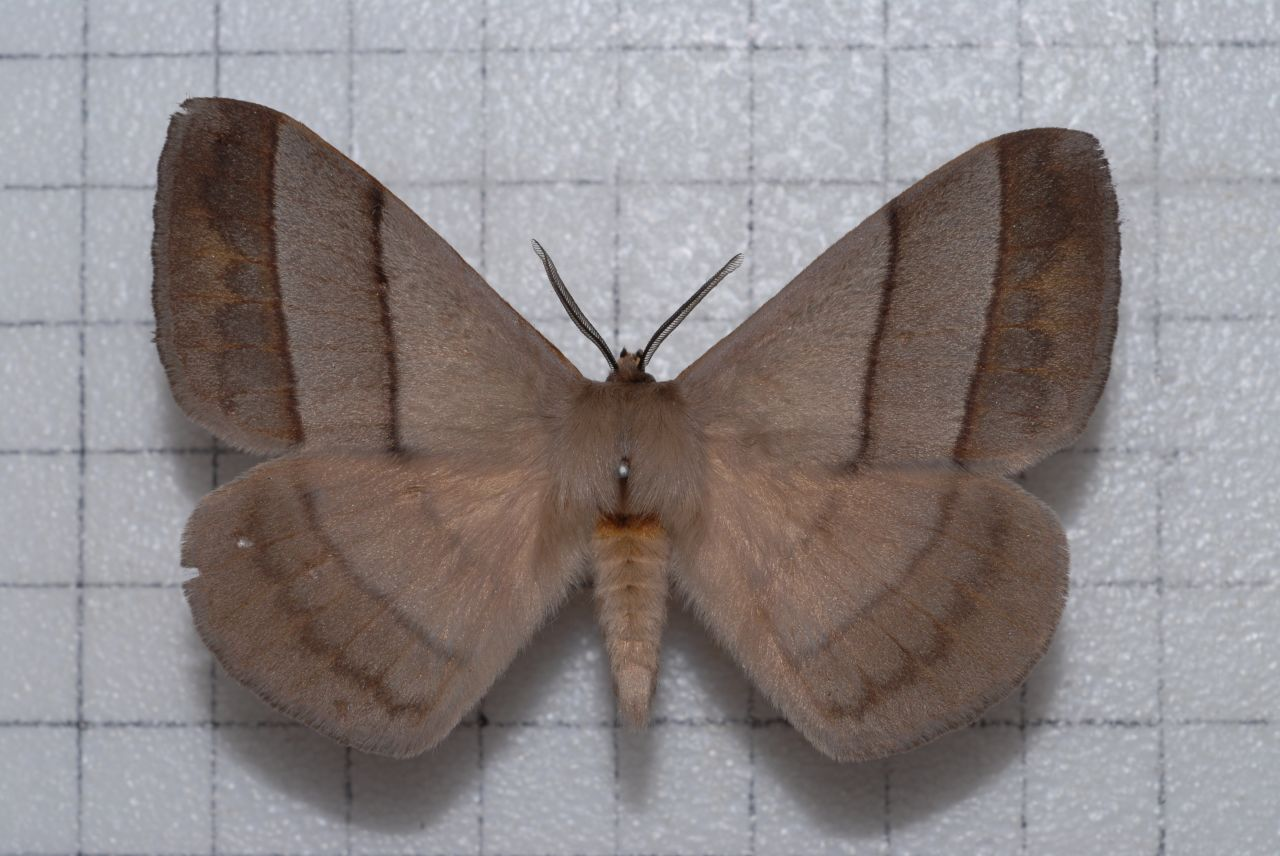
- Palirisa cervina

Scientific classification
- Kingdom: Animalia
- Phylum: Arthropoda
- Class: Insecta
- Order: Lepidoptera
- Family: Eupterotidae
- Tribe: Eupterotini
- Genus: Palirisa; Moore, 1884

= Palirisa =

Genus of moths

Palirisa is a genus of moths of the family Eupterotidae erected by Frederic Moore in 1884.

== Species ==
- Palirisa archivicina Bryk, 1944
- Palirisa cervina Moore, 1865
- Palirisa lineosa (Walker, 1855)
- Palirisa rotundala Mell, 1929
- Palirisa salex Pugaev & T.T. Du, 2011
- Palirisa sinensis Rothschild, 1917
- Palirisa taipeishanis Mell, 1937
