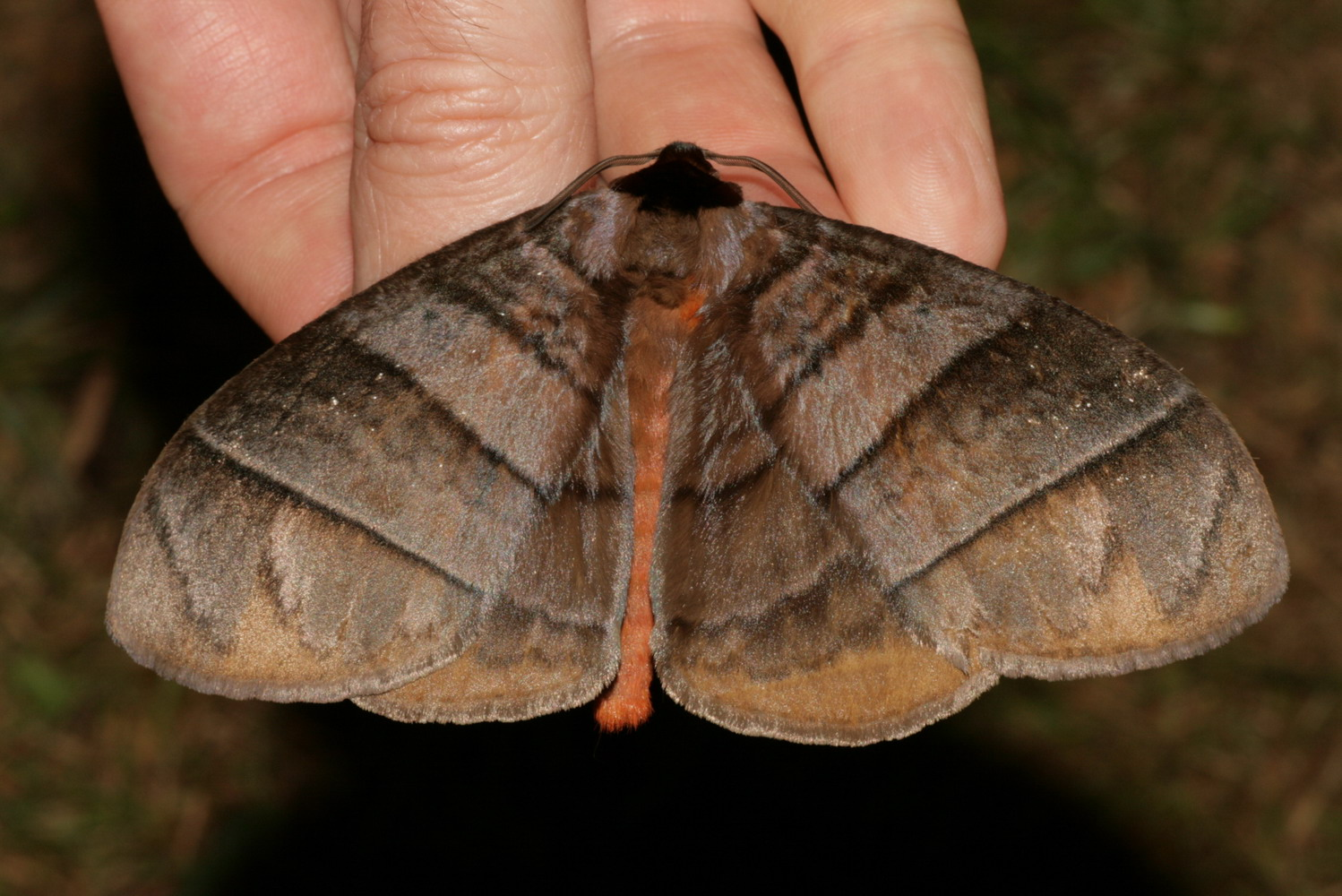
- Pseudojana perspicuifascia - Borneo, Crocker Range National Park

Scientific classification
- Kingdom: Animalia
- Phylum: Arthropoda
- Class: Insecta
- Order: Lepidoptera
- Family: Eupterotidae
- Genus: Pseudojana; Hampson, [1893]

= Pseudojana =

Genus of moths

Pseudojana is a genus of moths in the family Eupterotidae.

== Species ==
- Pseudojana clemensi Schultze, 1910
- Pseudojana incandescens Walker, 1855
- Pseudojana obscura Holloway, 1987
- Pseudojana pallidipennis Hampson, 1895
- Pseudojana perspicuifascia Rothschild, 1917
- Pseudojana roepkei Nieuwenhuis., 1948
- Pseudojana vitalisi Candèze, 1927
