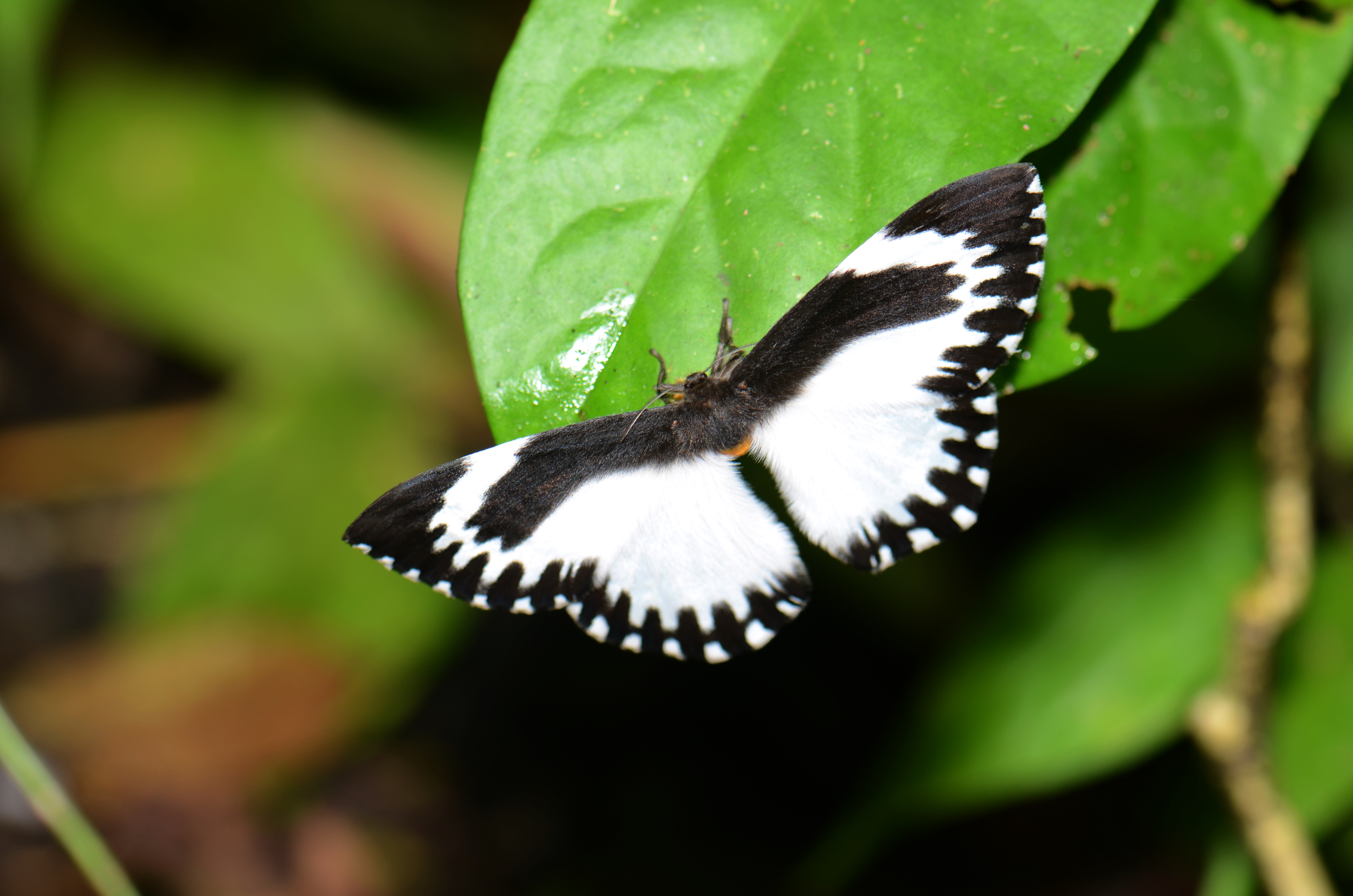
- Melanothrix nymphaliaria

Scientific classification
- Kingdom: Animalia
- Phylum: Arthropoda
- Class: Insecta
- Order: Lepidoptera
- Family: Eupterotidae
- Subfamily: Eupterotinae
- Genus: Melanothrix; Felder, 1874

= Melanothrix =

Genus of moths

Melanothrix is a genus of moths in the family Eupterotidae.

== Species ==
- Melanothrix alternans Pagenstecher, 1890
- Melanothrix fumosa Swinhoe, 1905
- Melanothrix latevittata Grünberg, 1914
- Melanothrix leucotrigona Hampson, 1893
- Melanothrix nymphaliaria Walker, 1866
- Melanothrix philippina Rothschild, 1917
- Melanothrix sanchezi Schultze, 1925
- Melanothrix semperi Rothschild, 1917

== Former species ==
- Melanothrix homochroa Grünberg, 1914
- Melanothrix intermedia Rothschild, 1917
- Melanothrix nicevillei Hampson, 1896
- Melanothrix radiata Grünberg, 1914
