= Papuapterote punctata =

Scientific classification
- Kingdom: Animalia
- Phylum: Arthropoda
- Class: Insecta
- Order: Lepidoptera
- Family: Eupterotidae
- Genus: Papuapterote
- Species: P. punctata

Binomial name
- Papuapterote punctata (Joicey & Talbot, 1916)

Synonyms
- Eupterote punctata Joicey & Talbot, 1916

Species of moth

Papuapterote punctata is a moth in the family Eupterotidae. It was described by James John Joicey and George Talbot in 1916. It is found on New Guinea.

The length of the forewings is about 48 mm. The wings are fawn brown, the forewings irrorated (sprinkled) with black. There is a black basal line and a black median band followed by four black discal lines which are waved and become thinner posteriorly. The basal line is straight and outwardly oblique, while the other lines are inwardly oblique and anteriorly curved inwards to the costa. There is also a waved, well-defined, pale outer discal line, followed by a strongly dentate black subterminal line, the space between being much irrorated with black scaling. There is a round ochreous spot at the end of the cell. The hindwings have two dark basal lines, two slightly waved discal lines, followed by a black dentate subterminal line, the space between them thinly irrorated with black scaling.
