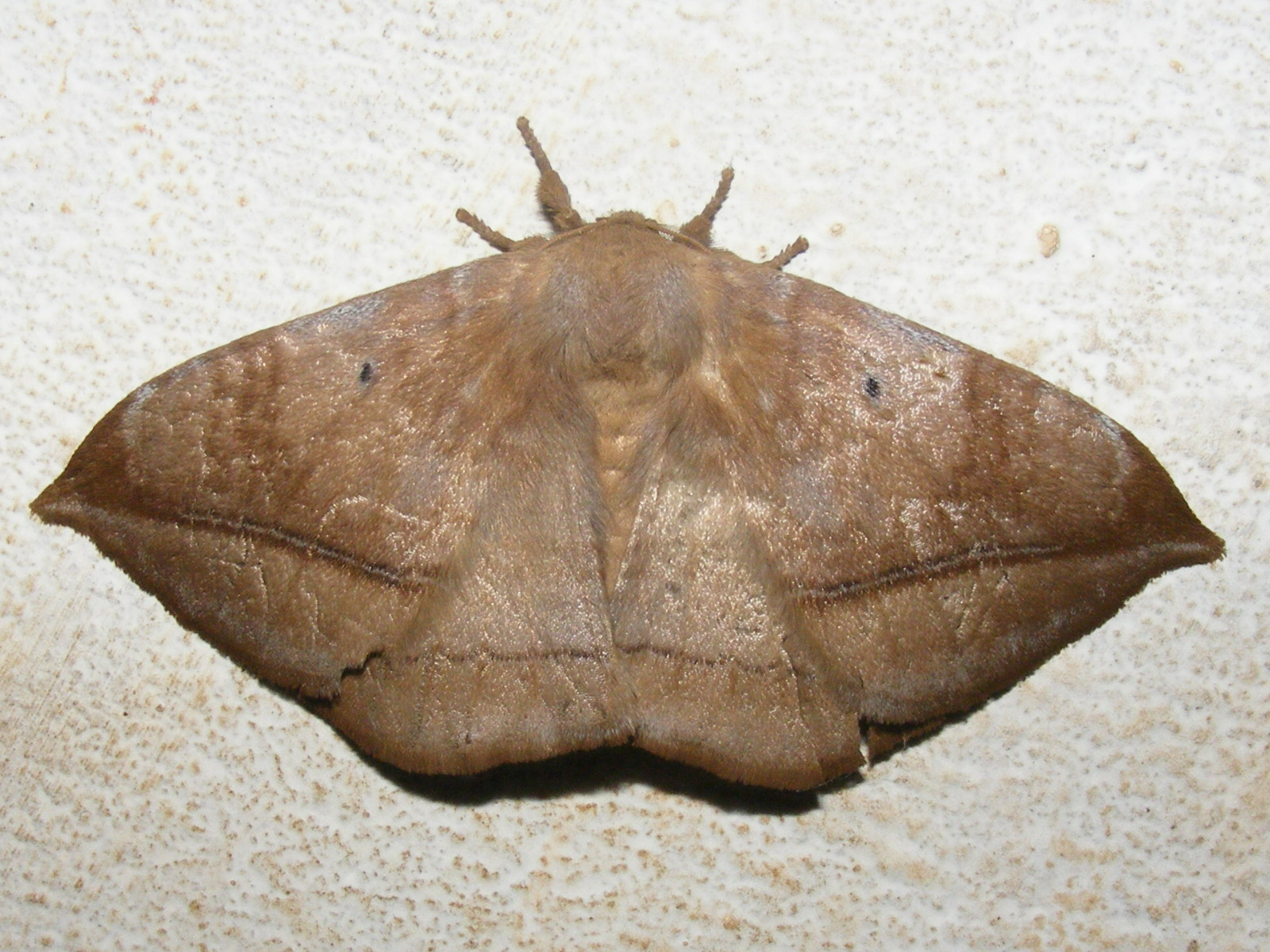

Scientific classification
- Kingdom: Animalia
- Phylum: Arthropoda
- Class: Insecta
- Order: Lepidoptera
- Family: Eupterotidae
- Genus: Ganisa
- Species: G. similis

Binomial name
- Ganisa similis Moore, 1884

= Ganisa similis =

Species of moth

Ganisa similis is a moth in the family Eupterotidae. It is found from the Himalayas to western China and Sundaland. The habitat consists of lowland and lower montane forests.

Adults are similar to Ganisa plana, but can be distinguished by the oblique dark shading of the forewings.
