= Nisaga =

Scientific classification
- Kingdom: Animalia
- Phylum: Arthropoda
- Class: Insecta
- Order: Lepidoptera
- Family: Eupterotidae
- Subfamily: Eupterotinae
- Genus: Nisaga; Walker, 1855

Genus of moths

Nisaga is a genus of moths in the family Eupterotidae.

== Species ==
- Nisaga rufescens Hampson, 1895
- Nisaga simplex Walker, 1855
