= Eupterote citrina =

Scientific classification
- Kingdom: Animalia
- Phylum: Arthropoda
- Clade: Pancrustacea
- Class: Insecta
- Order: Lepidoptera
- Family: Eupterotidae
- Genus: Eupterote
- Species: E. citrina

Binomial name
- Eupterote citrina Walker, 1855

Synonyms
- Eupterote lutosa Grünberg, 1914

Species of moth

Eupterote citrina is a moth in the family Eupterotidae. It was described by Francis Walker in 1855. It is found in India.

The wingspan is 50–84 mm. The wings are uniform pale yellowish white.
