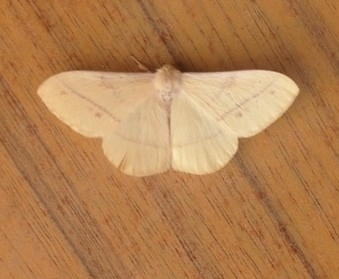

Scientific classification
- Kingdom: Animalia
- Phylum: Arthropoda
- Clade: Pancrustacea
- Class: Insecta
- Order: Lepidoptera
- Family: Eupterotidae
- Genus: Eupterote
- Species: E. orientalis

Binomial name
- Eupterote orientalis Fabricius

Synonyms
- Messata aenescens Moore, 1879

= Eupterote orientalis =

Species of moth

Eupterote orientalis is a moth in the family Eupterotidae. It was described by Johan Christian Fabricius, but the year of description is not clear. It is found in Sri Lanka and India.

Adults are senescent (bronzy) yellow, the forewings with three very prominent oblique, transverse, discal purple brown-speckled bands, the two inner bands linear and curved, the outer one composed of broad lunules. There is an inner series of three less oblique, very indistinct, and sparsely speckled bands. The hindwings have a distinct submarginal broad purple brown-speckled lunular band.
