= Apona plumosa =

Scientific classification
- Kingdom: Animalia
- Phylum: Arthropoda
- Class: Insecta
- Order: Lepidoptera
- Family: Eupterotidae
- Genus: Apona
- Species: A. plumosa

Binomial name
- Apona plumosa Moore, 1872

Species of moth

Apona plumosa is a moth in the family Eupterotidae. It was described by Frederic Moore in 1872. It is found in India.

The wingspan is 94–102 mm. Adults are similar to Apona cashmirensis, but are darker red-brown. The medial line on the forewings is curved below the costa, and there are faint traces of waved lines. The postmedial line is whitish inwardly and rufous outwardly and the outer area is darker, without a waved line, the veins crossing it rufous. The hindwings have almost obsolete waved and postmedial lines and the outer area is dark, without a waved line.
