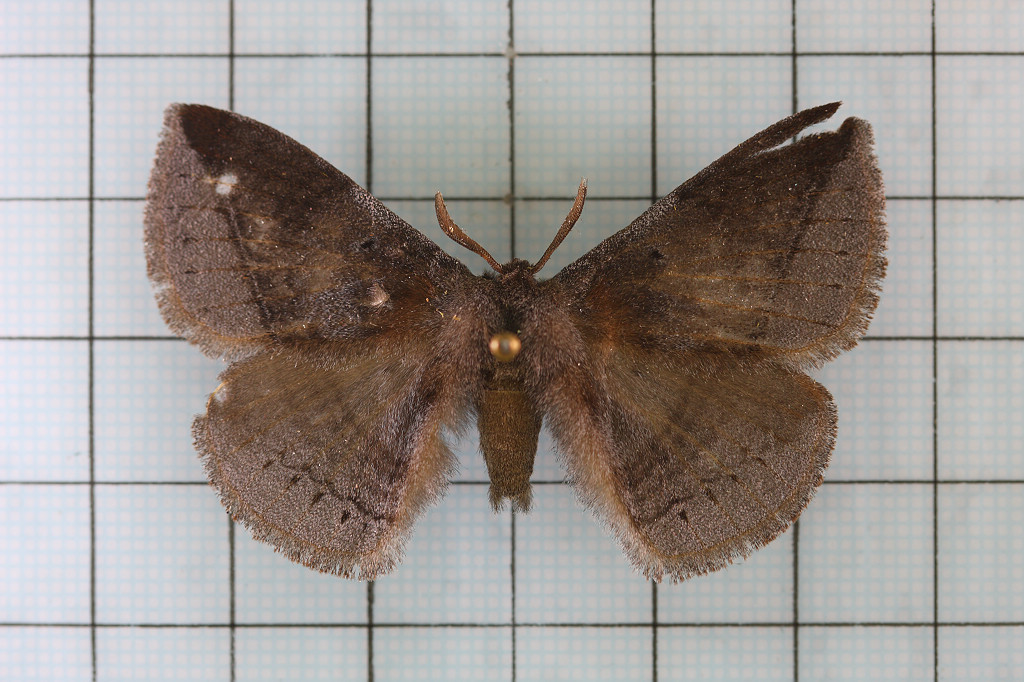
- Ganisa postica fromosicola

Scientific classification
- Kingdom: Animalia
- Phylum: Arthropoda
- Class: Insecta
- Order: Lepidoptera
- Family: Eupterotidae
- Genus: Ganisa
- Species: G. postica

Binomial name
- Ganisa postica Walker, 1855

Synonyms
- Ganisa melli Bryk, 1944; Ganisa monotonica Strand, 1924; Ganisa nigromaculifera Strand, 1924

= Ganisa postica =

Species of moth

Ganisa postica is a species of moth in the family Eupterotidae described by Francis Walker in 1855. It is found in India, Myanmar, Sri Lanka and Taiwan.

The larvae feed on Olea and Jasminum species.

== Description ==
The head of the male is very dark brown. Other parts and wings are purplish grey-brown. Forewing has an indistinct antemedial oblique line, a black and grey speckle at the end of the cell. The double oblique line runs from apex to inner margin. Hindwings have a black speck at the end of the cell and three waved indistinct lines. Cilia of both wings are reddish brown. Ventral side is with specks at end of the cell and waved lines more distinct.

== Subspecies ==
- Ganisa postica postica (Sri Lanka, India)
- Ganisa postica formosicola Matsumura, 1931 (Taiwan)
- Ganisa postica kuangtungensis Mell, 1929 (China)
- Ganisa postica wilhelminae Bryk, 1944 (Myanmar)
