= Apona shevaroyensis =

Scientific classification
- Kingdom: Animalia
- Phylum: Arthropoda
- Class: Insecta
- Order: Lepidoptera
- Family: Eupterotidae
- Genus: Apona
- Species: A. shevaroyensis

Binomial name
- Apona shevaroyensis Moore, 1884

Species of moth

Apona shevaroyensis is a moth in the family Eupterotidae. It was described by Frederic Moore in 1884. It is found in Sri Lanka.

The wingspan is about 134 mm. Adults are similar to Apona plumosa, but are duller brown and the antemedial line on the forewings is obsolete, the medial and postmedial lines are more oblique and the waved lines are more distinct.
