= Ebbepterote =

Scientific classification
- Kingdom: Animalia
- Phylum: Arthropoda
- Class: Insecta
- Order: Lepidoptera
- Family: Eupterotidae
- Genus: Ebbepterote; Oberprieler, Nässig & E.D. Edwards, 2003
- Species: E. expansa

Binomial name
- Ebbepterote expansa (T. P. Lucas, 1891)

Synonyms
- Darala expansa T. P. Lucas, 1891; Eupterote expansa; Eupterote doddi Turner, 1911

Genus of moths

Ebbepterote is a monotypic moth genus in the family Eupterotidae. It was erected by Rolf G. Oberprieler, Wolfgang A. Nässig and Edward David Edwards in 2003. Its only species, Ebbepterote expansa, was described by Thomas Pennington Lucas in 1891. It is found in Australia, where it has been recorded from Queensland.

The wingspan is approximately 118 mm. The forewings are fuscous with irrorations of red or fuscous and light fuscous and creamy-red scales. The basal fifth is drab white or wool colour, bordered by a smoke-coloured line from one-sixth of the costa to one-fourth of the inner margin. There is a conspicuous rich black line from three-fourths of the costa to three-fourths of the inner margin, bordered posteriorly by a wool-coloured suffused line. The ground colour between the first and second lines is a darker fuscous, relieved with smoky grey and brown suffusions. The discal spot is large, just before the centre of wing at one-third from the costa, creamy ochreous, bordered with black. There is a broad suffused band of reddish cream colour beyond the second line, bordered posteriorly by a wavy crenulate undefined line of diffused brown, which suffusion extends to the hindmargin. The hind marginal line is smoky brown. The basal fourth of the hindwings is ochreous brown, but creamy ochreous to nearly halfway. There is a broad brown-ochreous band beyond half, bordered anteriorly with a brown line and posteriorly with a deep rich black line and a black suffusion. There is a creamy-red band, suffused with smoky-brown scales, and bordered posteriorly by a wavy crenulate black-brown line, and by a dark brown suffusion with smoke-colour scales to the hindmargin. There is also a black patch on the inner margin at one-fourth.
