= Eupterote unicolor =

Scientific classification
- Kingdom: Animalia
- Phylum: Arthropoda
- Clade: Pancrustacea
- Class: Insecta
- Order: Lepidoptera
- Family: Eupterotidae
- Genus: Eupterote
- Species: E. unicolor

Binomial name
- Eupterote unicolor Hampson, 1891

Species of moth

Eupterote unicolor is a moth in the family Eupterotidae. It was described by George Hampson in 1891. It is found in India.

The wingspan is 68–72 mm. The wings are vinous red brown with an almost obsolete postmedial line, curved below the costa, and with traces of some spots beyond it. The abdomen and costa of the hindwings are sometimes yellowish.
