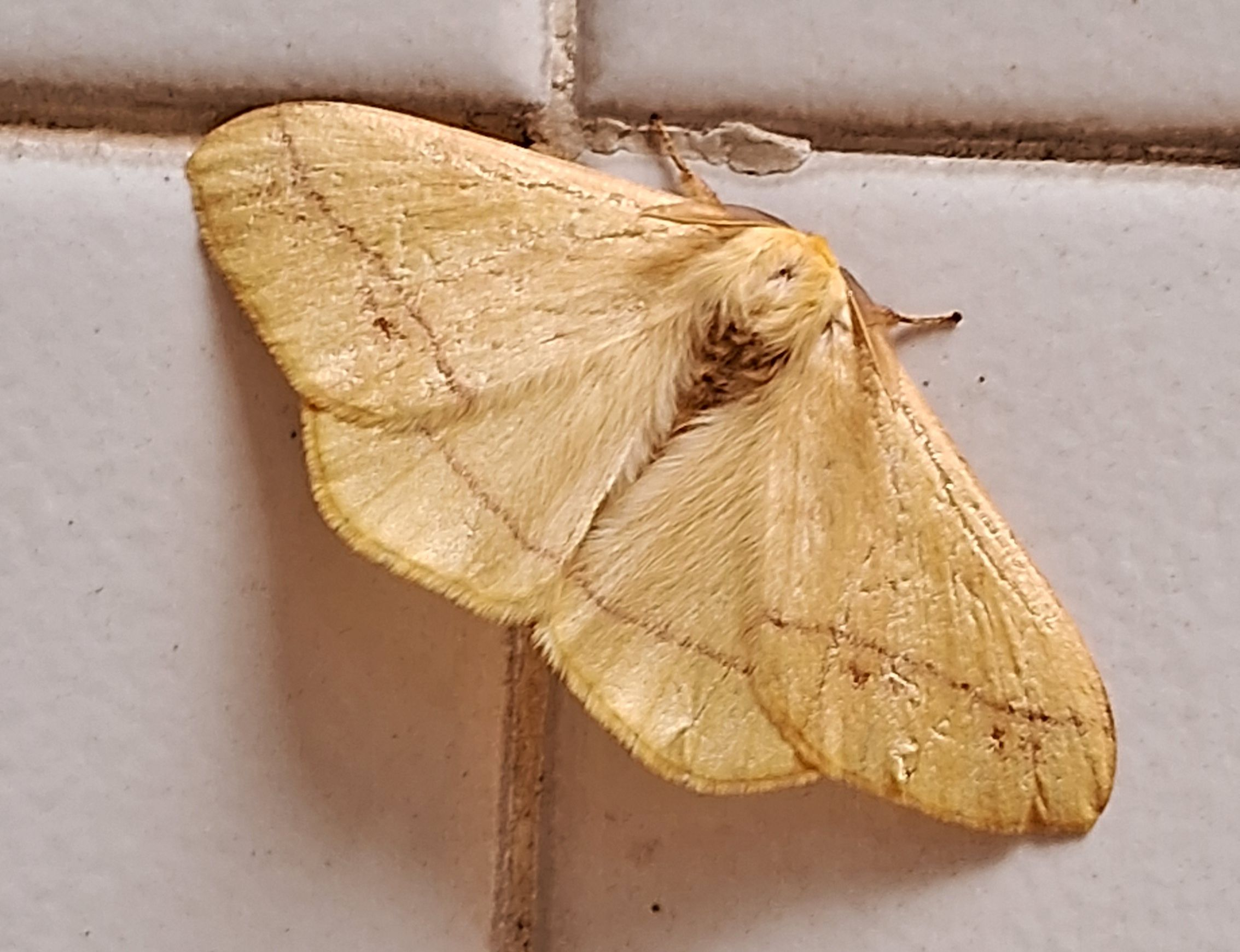

Scientific classification
- Kingdom: Animalia
- Phylum: Arthropoda
- Clade: Pancrustacea
- Class: Insecta
- Order: Lepidoptera
- Family: Eupterotidae
- Genus: Eupterote
- Species: E. hibisci

Binomial name
- Eupterote hibisci (Fabricius, 1775)

Synonyms
- Bombyx hibisci Fabricius, 1775; Eupterote anada Moore, 1860; Phaleana petosiris Cramer, 1782

= Eupterote hibisci =

Species of moth

Eupterote hibisci is a moth in the family Eupterotidae. It was described by Johan Christian Fabricius in 1775. It is found in India.
