= Eupterote pandya =

Scientific classification
- Kingdom: Animalia
- Phylum: Arthropoda
- Clade: Pancrustacea
- Class: Insecta
- Order: Lepidoptera
- Family: Eupterotidae
- Genus: Eupterote
- Species: E. pandya

Binomial name
- Eupterote pandya (Moore, 1865)

Synonyms
- Tagora pandya Moore, [1866]; Ganisa pandya; Pandala pandya; Ganisa pallida Butler, 1881; Pandala pandaya niassana Rothschild, 1917

Species of moth

Eupterote pandya is a moth in the family Eupterotidae. It was described by Frederic Moore in 1865. It is found in India.

Adults are greyish fawn-colour, the forewings with several transverse indistinct brown undulating lines, curving inwardly to the costa, bordered exteriorly by an oblique dark double line extending from the apex to the inner margin. The hindwings have a similar series of undulating lines and a dark-bordered double line. Both wings have a submarginal series of blackish spots.
