= Ganisa plana =

Scientific classification
- Kingdom: Animalia
- Phylum: Arthropoda
- Class: Insecta
- Order: Lepidoptera
- Family: Eupterotidae
- Genus: Ganisa
- Species: G. plana

Binomial name
- Ganisa plana Walker, 1855

Species of moth

Ganisa plana is a moth in the family Eupterotidae. It was described by Francis Walker in 1855. It is found from the Himalayas to southern China and Sundaland, as well as in Palawan in the Philippines. The habitat consists of lowland and lower montane forests.

The larvae feed on Jasminum species.
