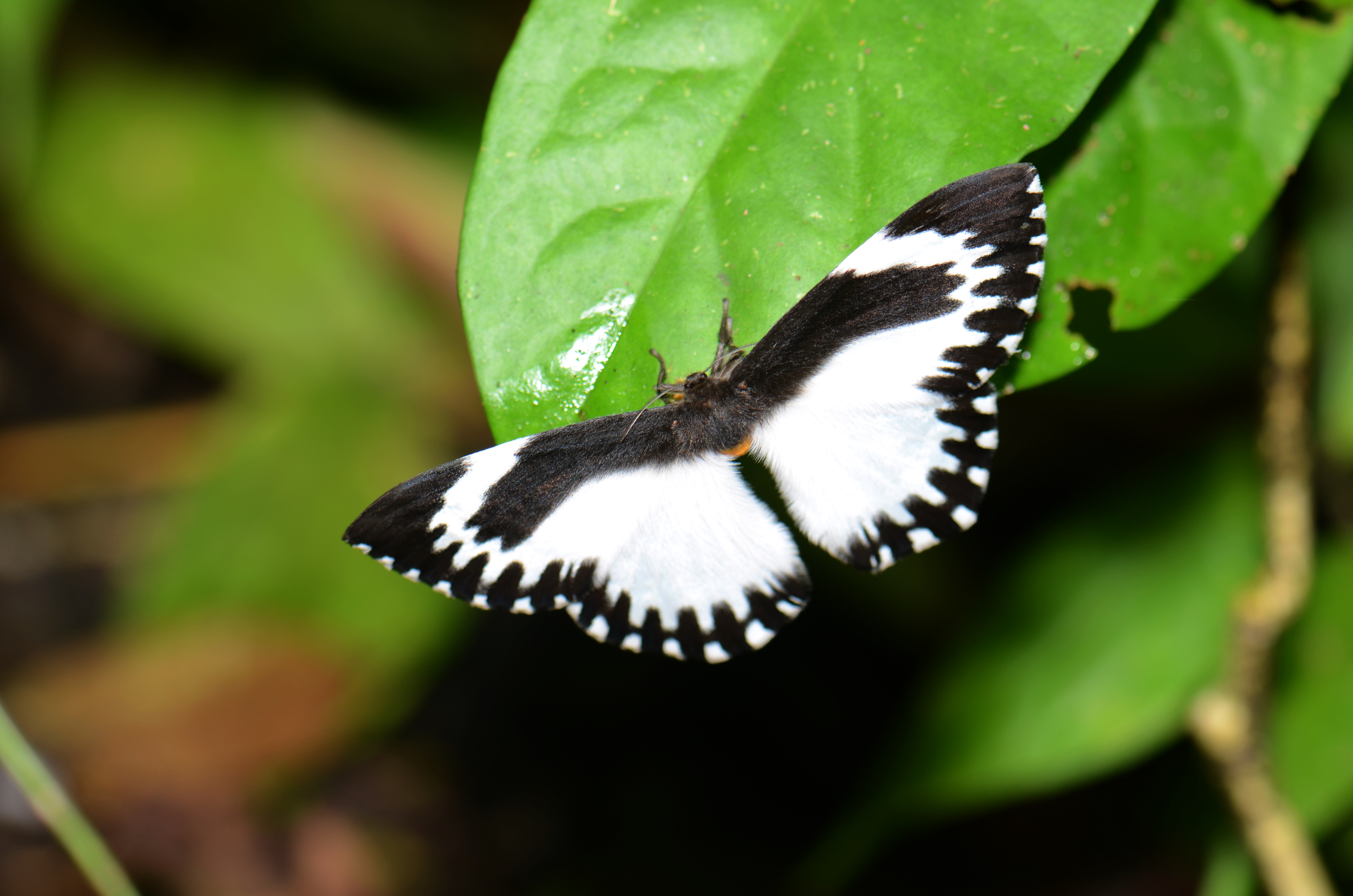

Scientific classification
- Kingdom: Animalia
- Phylum: Arthropoda
- Class: Insecta
- Order: Lepidoptera
- Family: Eupterotidae
- Genus: Melanothrix
- Species: M. nymphaliaria

Binomial name
- Melanothrix nymphaliaria (Walker, 1866)

Synonyms
- Gnophos nymphaliaria Waker, 1866; Melanothrix pulchricolor Felder, 1874; Euterote coryna Swinhoe, 1893; Melanothrix atropurpurea Aurivillius, 1894; Melanothrix albidior Rothschild, 1910; Melanothrix radiata Grunberg, 1914; Melanthrix leucotrigona sundaensis Holloway, 1976

= Melanothrix nymphaliaria =

Species of moth

Melanothrix nymphaliaria is a moth in the family Eupterotidae. It was described by Francis Walker in 1866. It is found on Java, Sumatra and Borneo and possibly also in the Philippines. The habitat consists of lowland forests.
