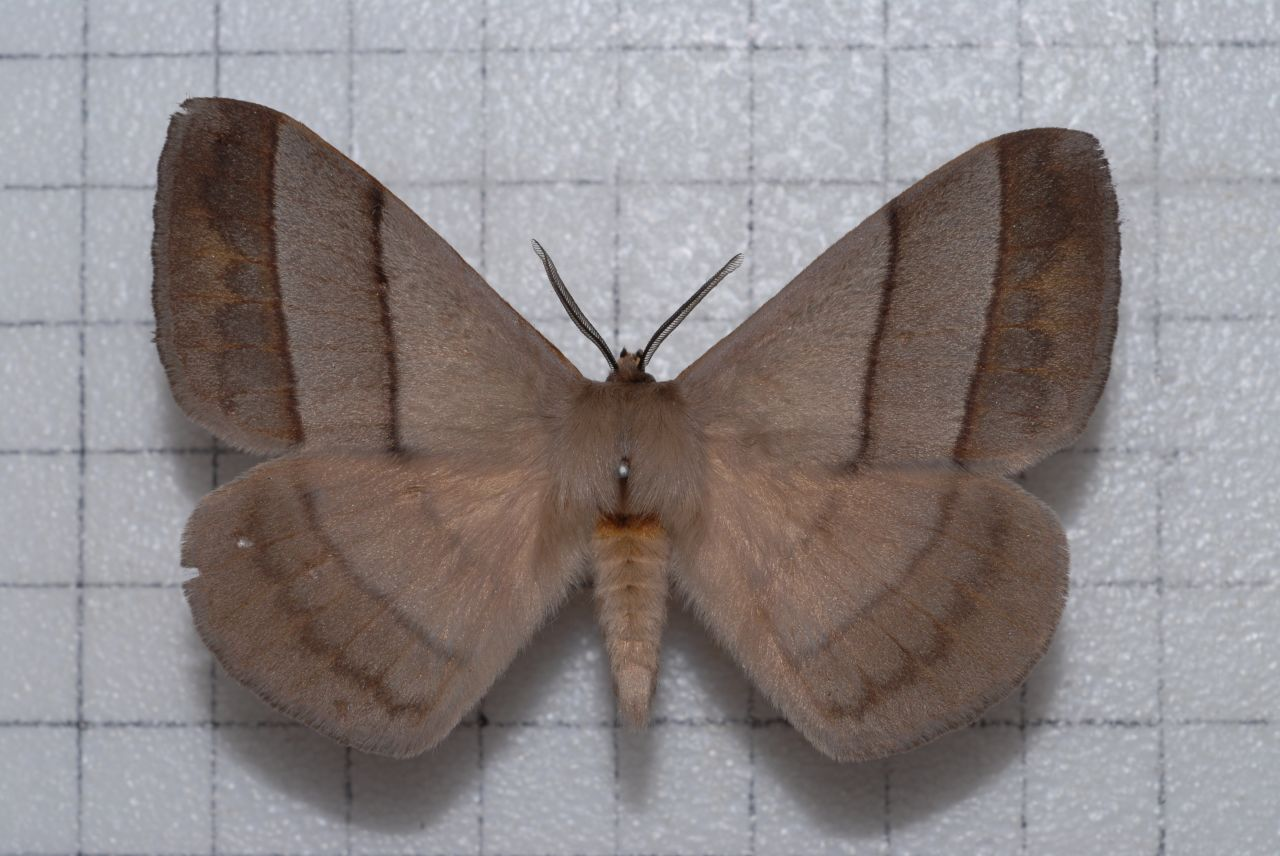
- Palirisa cervina formosana

Scientific classification
- Kingdom: Animalia
- Phylum: Arthropoda
- Class: Insecta
- Order: Lepidoptera
- Family: Eupterotidae
- Genus: Palirisa
- Species: P. cervina

Binomial name
- Palirisa cervina Moore, 1865

Synonyms
- Palirisa burmanica Strand, 1924; Palirisa angustifasciata Mell, 1937; Palirisa chocolatina Mell, 1937; Palirisa curvilineata Mell, 1937; Palirisa roseitincta Mell, 1937; Palirisa significata Mell, 1937

= Palirisa cervina =

Species of moth

Palirisa cervina is a moth of the family Eupterotidae first described by Frederic Moore in 1865. It is found in south-east Asia, including Thailand, Vietnam, Myanmar, India and Taiwan.

The wingspan is about 104 mm. Adults are similar to Palirisa lineosa, but are pale grey brown and only the medial and postmedial rufous lines on the forewings are present, the latter with a waved line beyond it, between which and the postmedial line the colour is darker. The hindwings have three obsolescent lines and no outer line.

== Subspecies ==
- Palirisa cervina cervina (Burma, India)
- Palirisa cervina annamensis Mell, 1929 (China)
- Palirisa cervina birmana Bryk, 1944 (Myanmar)
- Palirisa cervina formosana Matsumura, 1931 (Taiwan)
- Palirisa cervina mosoensis Mell, 1937 (China: Yunnan)
- Palirisa cervina renei Bryk, 1944 (Myanmar)
