= Apha floralis =

Scientific classification
- Kingdom: Animalia
- Phylum: Arthropoda
- Class: Insecta
- Order: Lepidoptera
- Family: Eupterotidae
- Genus: Apha
- Species: A. floralis

Binomial name
- Apha floralis Butler, 1881

Species of moth

Apha floralis is a moth in the family Eupterotidae. It was described by Arthur Gardiner Butler in 1881. It is found in Nepal.
