= Eupterote lineosa =

Scientific classification
- Kingdom: Animalia
- Phylum: Arthropoda
- Clade: Pancrustacea
- Class: Insecta
- Order: Lepidoptera
- Family: Eupterotidae
- Genus: Eupterote
- Species: E. lineosa

Binomial name
- Eupterote lineosa (Walker, 1855)

Synonyms
- Lasiocampa lineosa Walker, 1855; Murlida fraterna Moore, 1884

Species of moth

Eupterote lineosa is a moth in the family Eupterotidae. It was described by Francis Walker in 1855. It is found in Nepal, India and Sri Lanka.

The wingspan is 70–90 mm. The forewings have a single, almost straight, oblique postmedial line with at most five waved lines before it. The two spots beyond it towards the costa and two towards the inner margin are generally present. The outer waved line is indistinct. The colour varies from pale primrose yellow to bright ochreous yellow.
