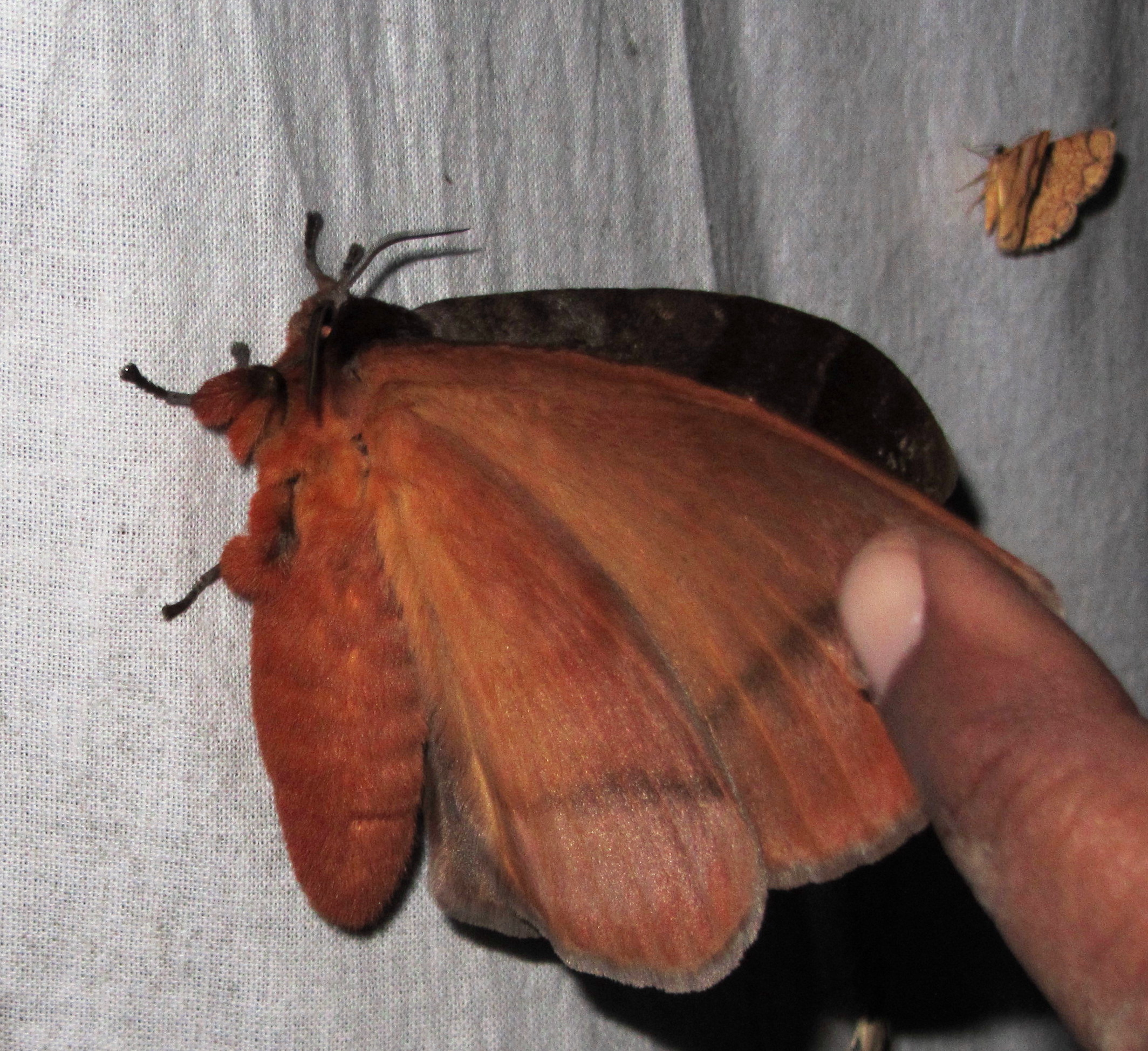

Scientific classification
- Kingdom: Animalia
- Phylum: Arthropoda
- Class: Insecta
- Order: Lepidoptera
- Family: Eupterotidae
- Genus: Pseudojana
- Species: P. incandescens

Binomial name
- Pseudojana incandescens (Walker, 1855)

Synonyms
- Jana incandescens Walker, 1855

= Pseudojana incandescens =

Species of moth

Pseudojana incandescens is a moth in the family Eupterotidae. It was described by Francis Walker in 1855. It is found in Sikkim, India.

The forewings are greyish brown, with traces of a subbasal curved grey line and indistinct antemedial, medial and bent medial erect straight dark lines, the last inwardly edged with grey. There is an indistinct submarginal line angled at vein four. The hindwings are duller brown.
