= Eupterote geminata =

Scientific classification
- Kingdom: Animalia
- Phylum: Arthropoda
- Clade: Pancrustacea
- Class: Insecta
- Order: Lepidoptera
- Family: Eupterotidae
- Genus: Eupterote
- Species: E. geminata

Binomial name
- Eupterote geminata (Walker, 1855)

Synonyms
- Dreata geminata Walker, 1855; Dreata lineata Walker, 1855; Brachytera phalaenaria Felder, 1874

Species of moth

Eupterote geminata is a moth in the family Eupterotidae. It was described by Francis Walker in 1855. It is found in India and Sri Lanka.

The wingspan is 58–80 mm. The forewings have a single medial indistinct slightly curved line. Both wings have a prominent postmedial slightly curved line.

The Global Lepidoptera Names Index gives this name as a synonym of Eupterote hibisci.
