= Eupterote patula =

Scientific classification
- Kingdom: Animalia
- Phylum: Arthropoda
- Clade: Pancrustacea
- Class: Insecta
- Order: Lepidoptera
- Family: Eupterotidae
- Genus: Eupterote
- Species: E. patula

Binomial name
- Eupterote patula (Walker, 1855)

Synonyms
- Tagora patula Walker, 1855; Sphingognatha khasiana Moore, 1879; Tagora abnorminervis Strand, 1924; Tagora dehyalinata Strand, 1924; Tagora undulosa Walker, 1855

Species of moth

Eupterote patula is a moth in the family Eupterotidae. It was described by Francis Walker in 1855. It is found in Thailand, Myanmar and India.

The wingspan is 100–130 mm. The wings are pale reddish ochreous, the forewings usually with a hyaline (glass-like) spot at the end of the cell. There are two rufous oblique lines from the lower angle of the cell to the inner margin and there are eight or nine indistinct dark waved lines, as well as a double highly curved rufous postmedial line from the costa near the apex to the outer angle and a submarginal highly waved irregular indistinct dark line. The hindwings have a rufous subbasal line, which is obsolete except towards the inner margin. There are about four very indistinct waved lines and the rufous postmedial line is indistinct. There is an irregularly placed series of submarginal spots.
