= Nisaga simplex =

Scientific classification
- Kingdom: Animalia
- Phylum: Arthropoda
- Clade: Pancrustacea
- Class: Insecta
- Order: Lepidoptera
- Family: Eupterotidae
- Genus: Nisaga
- Species: N. simplex

Binomial name
- Nisaga simplex Walker, 1855

Synonyms
- Nisaga modesta Moore, 1884

Species of moth

Nisaga simplex is a moth in the family Eupterotidae. It was described by Francis Walker in 1855. It is found in Bangladesh.

The wingspan is 42–50 millimetres (1.7–2.0 in). The forewings are whitish, yellowish or reddish brown, the interspaces with very broad dark red-brown streaks, which may be partially or (in form modesta) quite obsolete.

The larvae have been reared from various grasses and have been recorded as a pest of rice.
