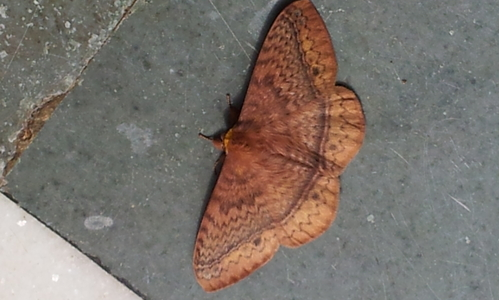

Scientific classification
- Kingdom: Animalia
- Phylum: Arthropoda
- Clade: Pancrustacea
- Class: Insecta
- Order: Lepidoptera
- Family: Eupterotidae
- Genus: Eupterote
- Species: E. undata

Binomial name
- Eupterote undata Blanchard, [1844]

Synonyms
- Eupterote affinis Moore, 1884; Eupterote assimilis Moore, 1884; Eupterote caliginosa Moore, 1884; Eupterote castanoptera Moore, 1884; Eupterote cinnamomea Moore, 1884; Eupterote consimilis Moore, 1884; Eupterote cupreipennis Moore, 1884; Eupterote decorata Moore, 1884; Eupterote diabolica Swinhoe, 1885; Eupterote dissimilis Moore, 1884; Eupterote fraterna Moore, 1884; Eupterote griseipennis Moore, 1884; Eupterote hirsuta Swinhoe, 1891; Eupterote ignavus Swinhoe, 1886; Eupterote imbecilis Walker, 1855; Eupterote invalida Butler; Eupterote jaresia Swinhoe; Eupterote nigricans Moore, 1884; Eupterote persimilis Moore, 1884; Eupterote similis Moore, 1883; Eupterote sinuata Moore, 1884; Eupterote subdita Moore, 1884; Eupterote suffusa Moore, 1884; Dreata taooensis Moore, 1878; Dreata undifera Walker, 1855; Eupterote undulata; Eupterote variegata Moore, 1884; Eupterote vinosa Moore, 1884

= Eupterote undata =

Species of moth

Eupterote undata is a moth of the family Eupterotidae. It is found in Pakistan, India, Sri Lanka, Burma, Sumatra, Java and the Philippines.

The wingspan is about 70 mm for females and 65 mm for males.

The larvae feed on Elettaria, Eugenia hemispherica, Coffea arabica, Maesa indica, Macaranga indica, Veronia arborea, Persea macrantha and Paulownia species.
