= Eupterote testacea =

Scientific classification
- Kingdom: Animalia
- Phylum: Arthropoda
- Clade: Pancrustacea
- Class: Insecta
- Order: Lepidoptera
- Family: Eupterotidae
- Genus: Eupterote
- Species: E. testacea

Binomial name
- Eupterote testacea Walker, 1855

Species of moth

Eupterote testacea is a moth in the family Eupterotidae. It was described by Francis Walker in 1855. It is found in India and Myanmar.

The wingspan is 68–86 mm. The wings are pale ochreous yellow, the forewings crossed by two antemedial and two medial, nearly straight indistinct dark lines. There is a double postmedial similar line, the inner line well defined. There is also a waved submarginal line and the basal and outer areas are irrorated with dark scales. The hindwings have an antemedial line, a double postmedial line and a diffused submarginal curved line.
