= Eupterote glaucescens =

Scientific classification
- Kingdom: Animalia
- Phylum: Arthropoda
- Clade: Pancrustacea
- Class: Insecta
- Order: Lepidoptera
- Family: Eupterotidae
- Genus: Eupterote
- Species: E. glaucescens

Binomial name
- Eupterote glaucescens (Walker, 1855)

Synonyms
- Ganisa glaucescens Walker, 1855; Tagora glaucescens

Species of moth

Eupterote glaucescens is a moth in the family Eupterotidae. It was described by Francis Walker in 1855. It is found in India.
