= Palirisa lineosa =

Scientific classification
- Kingdom: Animalia
- Phylum: Arthropoda
- Class: Insecta
- Order: Lepidoptera
- Family: Eupterotidae
- Genus: Palirisa
- Species: P. lineosa

Binomial name
- Palirisa lineosa (Walker, 1855)

Synonyms
- Jana lineosa Walker, 1855

Species of moth

Palirisa lineosa is a moth in the family Eupterotidae. It was described by Francis Walker in 1855. It is found in Bangladesh and Myanmar.

Adults are testaceous, the forewings with five oblique ferruginous bands. The first and second bands slightly converging hindward, second and third slightly diverging. The third and fourth are almost parallel, with two indistinct paler bands between them. The wing beyond the fourth band is darker than elsewhere. The fifth band is slightly curved, converging towards the fourth. The hindwings have three paler bands, which correspond to the third, fourth and fifth of the forewings.

== Subspecies ==
- Palirisa lineosa lineosa (Bangladesh)
- Palirisa lineosa noncurvata Bryk, 1944 (Burma)
