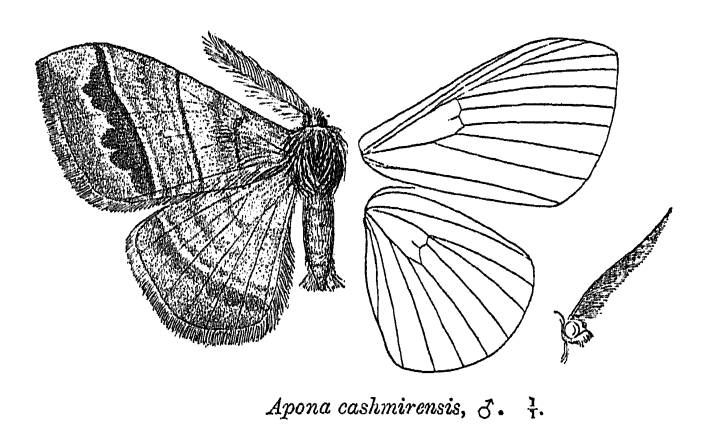

Scientific classification
- Kingdom: Animalia
- Phylum: Arthropoda
- Class: Insecta
- Order: Lepidoptera
- Family: Eupterotidae
- Genus: Apona
- Species: A. caschmirensis

Binomial name
- Apona caschmirensis (Kollar, 1844)

Synonyms
- Gastropacha caschmirensis Kollar, 1844; Apona cashmirensis (Kollar, 1844); Apona pallida Walker, 1856; Apona major Rothschild, 1917

= Apona caschmirensis =

Species of moth

Apona caschmirensis is a moth of the family Eupterotidae first described by Vincenz Kollar in 1844. It is found in Nepal, Pakistan and India.

The wingspan is 96–114 mm. The wings are pale red brown. The forewings have an indistinct waved subbasal line and a black spot at the end of the cell and there is an oblique medial line, with three indistinct waved lines beyond it. There is a double postmedial line with a pale interspace and there is also a waved submarginal line, the space between it and the postmedial line darker. The nervules are dark from the medial to the submarginal line. The hindwings have no subbasal line and the other lines are curved.
