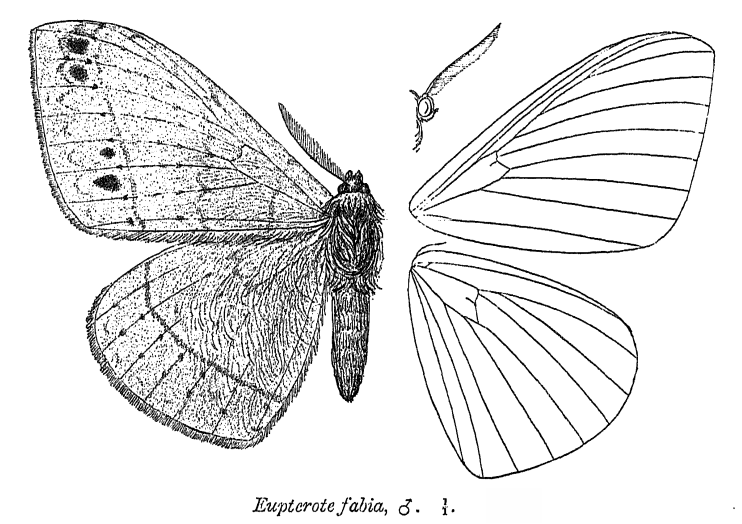
- Male Eupterote fabia (Cramer 1780), upperside, wing venation, head from lateral

Scientific classification
- Kingdom: Animalia
- Phylum: Arthropoda
- Clade: Pancrustacea
- Class: Insecta
- Order: Lepidoptera
- Family: Eupterotidae
- Genus: Eupterote
- Species: E. fabia

Binomial name
- Eupterote fabia (Cramer, 1780)

Synonyms
- Phalaena fabia Cramer, [1779]; Eupterote lucia Butler, 1885; Eurhodia acuminalba van Eecke, 1924; Eupterote alterata Moore, 1884; Eupterote auriflua Moore, 1884; Eupterote discordans Butler, 1881; Eupterote fasciata Moore, 1887; Eupterote gyras Swinhoe, 1885; Eupterote immutata Moore, 1884; Eupterote mutans Walker, 1855; Eupterote ochripicta Moore, 1879; Eupterote permutata Moore, 1884

= Eupterote fabia =

Species of moth

Eupterote fabia is a moth in the family Eupterotidae. It was described by Pieter Cramer in 1780. It is found in India, Sri Lanka and Bhutan.

The wingspan is 90–130 mm. The ground colour of the adults is bright yellow.

The larvae feed on the leaves of cardamom and coffee.

== Subspecies ==
- Eupterote fabia fabia
- Eupterote fabia acuminalba van Eecke, 1924
- Eupterote fabia asemos Bryk, 1950
- Eupterote fabia ochripicta Moore, 1879 (Sri Lanka)
