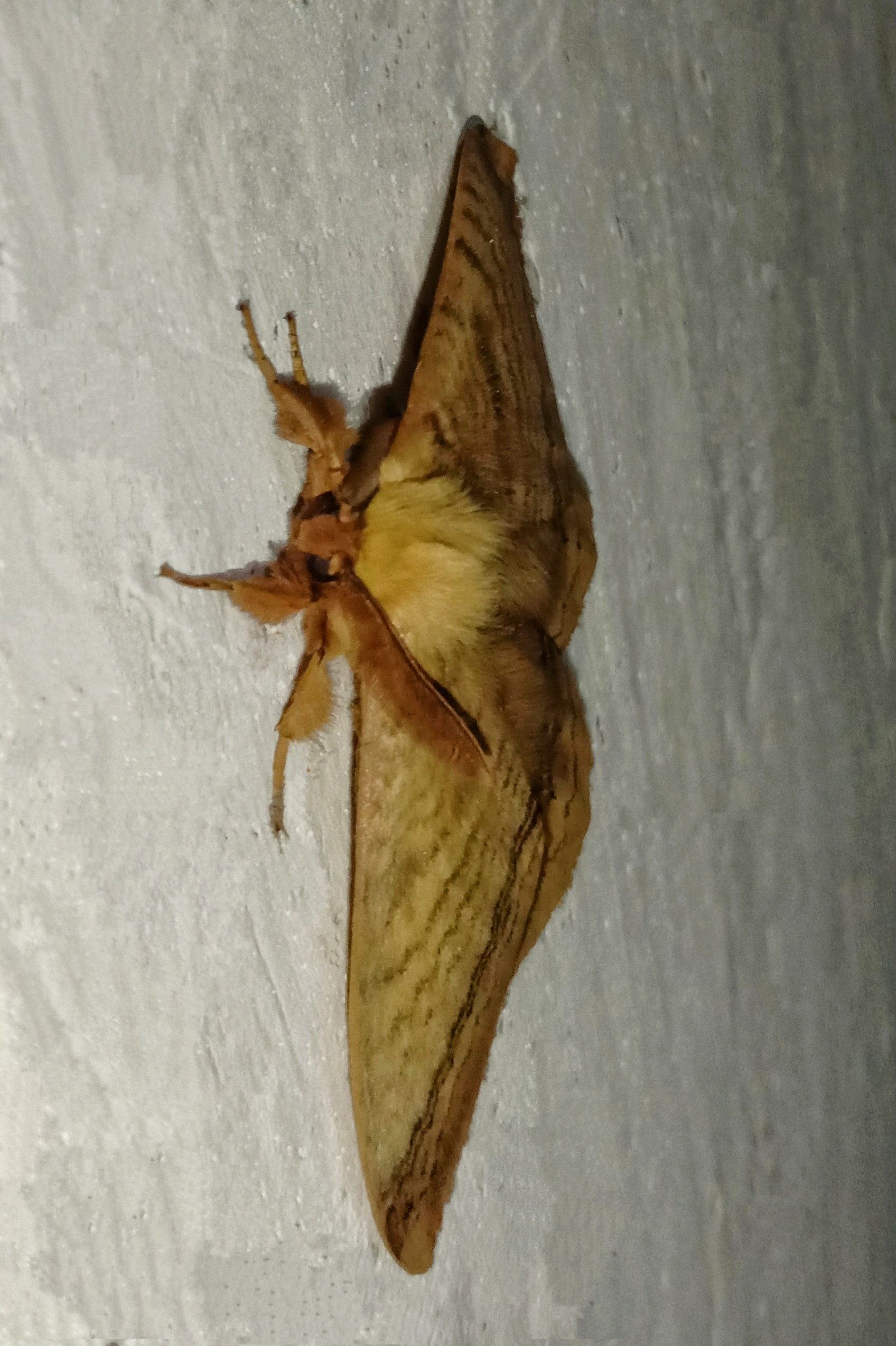
- Eupterote mollifera captured at night in West Bengal
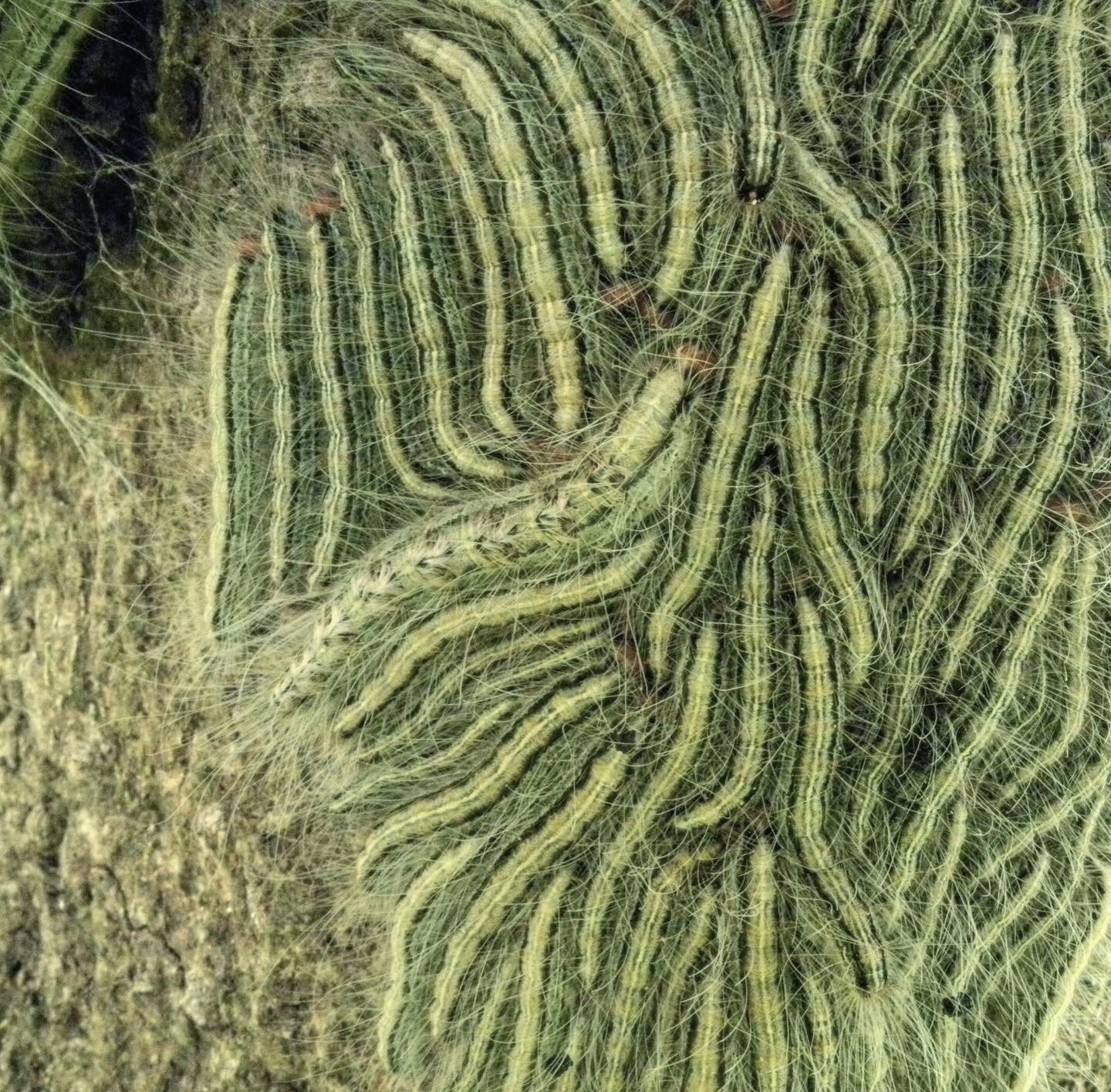
- Caterpillars in Maharashtra (2001)

Scientific classification
- Kingdom: Animalia
- Phylum: Arthropoda
- Clade: Pancrustacea
- Class: Insecta
- Order: Lepidoptera
- Family: Eupterotidae
- Genus: Eupterote
- Species: E. mollifera

Binomial name
- Eupterote mollifera Walker, 1865

Synonyms
- Tagora anthereata Walker, 1865; Eupterote canaraica Moore, 1879; Eupterote contaminata Moore, 1884; Tagora discrepans Moore, 1884; Apha flava Moore, 1884; Eupterote flavia Hampson, 1891; Eupterote lativittata Moore, 1884; Eupterote mollis Moore, 1884; Eupterote nilgirica Moore, 1879; Bomochroa ornata Felder, 1874; Eupterote rectifascia Hampson, 1891; Eupterote rufodisca Hampson, 1891; Eupterote todara Moore, 1884; Eupterote olivescens Rothschild, 1920

= Eupterote mollifera =

Species of moth

Eupterote mollifera is a moth in the family Eupterotidae. It was described by Francis Walker in 1865. It is found in India, Myanmar and Sri Lanka.

The wingspan is 64–84 mm. Adults are similar to Eupterote fabia, but are smaller, with the ground colour always yellow or drab in both sexes, often more or less suffused with rufous. The forewings have at most five waved lines within the double postmedial lines, one of which is often obsolete. The hindwings have three lines at most within the postmedial lines and the outer waved line and spots within it are variable.

The larvae are whitish, speckled with black and with dorsal tufts of black hairs arising from a whitish hump. There is a dorsal blue-black band and a subdorsal pinkish band traversed by a grey line, as well as a series of small lateral black spots. The sublateral area is purplish grey with long hairs. The stigmata and legs are pink and the head is black.

== Subspecies ==
- Eupterote mollifera mollifera
- Eupterote mollifera contrastica Bryk, 1944 (Myanmar)
