= List of moths of Australia (Eupterotidae) =

Partial list of Australian moths

This is a list of the Australian moth species of the family Eupterotidae. It also acts as an index to the species articles and forms part of the full List of moths of Australia.

== Eupterotinae ==
- Cotana neurina Turner, 1922
- Cotana serranotata (T.P. Lucas, 1894)
- Eupterote expansa (T.P. Lucas, 1891)

== Panacelinae ==
- Panacela lewinae (Lewin, 1805)
- Panacela nyctopa (Turner, 1922)
- Panacela syntropha Turner, 1922
