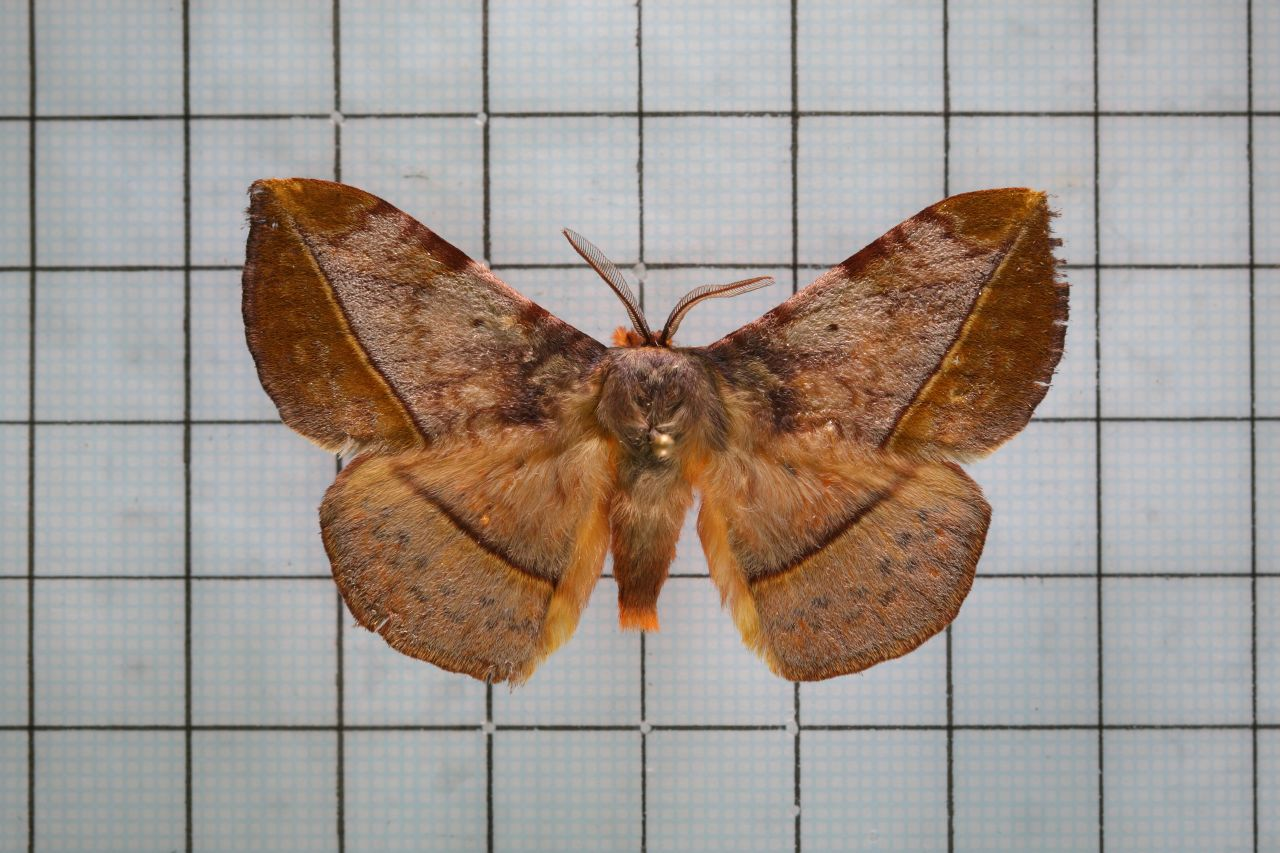

Scientific classification
- Kingdom: Animalia
- Phylum: Arthropoda
- Class: Insecta
- Order: Lepidoptera
- Family: Eupterotidae
- Genus: Apha
- Species: A. arisana

Binomial name
- Apha arisana Matsumura, 1927

Synonyms
- Apha tychoona arisana

= Apha arisana =

Species of moth

Apha arisana is a moth of the family Eupterotidae first described by Shōnen Matsumura in 1927. It is found in China and Taiwan.

== Taxonomy ==
Apha arisana is allied to Apha horishana and both species were described as subspecies of Apha tychoona by Matsumura in 1927. They were later raised to species status by Yasunori Kishida in 1978.
