= Striginiana pseudostrigina =

Scientific classification
- Kingdom: Animalia
- Phylum: Arthropoda
- Class: Insecta
- Order: Lepidoptera
- Family: Eupterotidae
- Genus: Striginiana
- Species: S. pseudostrigina

Binomial name
- Striginiana pseudostrigina (Rothschild, 1917)

Synonyms
- Jana pseudostrigina Rothschild, 1917

Species of moth

Striginiana pseudostrigina is a moth in the family Eupterotidae. It was described by Rothschild in 1917. It is found in the Democratic Republic of Congo.

Adults are similar to Striginiana strigina, but are paler and have the light area on the inner side of the postmedian band, as well as a row of arrow-head marks on the nervures joined into a band by intranervular lunules, instead of a double row of dots on the nervures. Furthermore, the black antemedian band of the hindwings is narrower.
