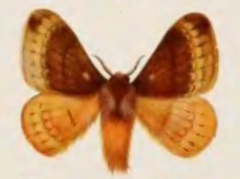

Scientific classification
- Kingdom: Animalia
- Phylum: Arthropoda
- Class: Insecta
- Order: Lepidoptera
- Family: Eupterotidae
- Genus: Cotana
- Species: C. albaserrati

Binomial name
- Cotana albaserrati (Bethune-Baker, 1910)

Synonyms
- Hypercydas albaserrati Bethune-Baker, 1910; Cotana lunulata albaserrati

= Cotana albaserrati =

Species of moth

Cotana albaserrati is a moth in the family Eupterotidae. It was described by George Thomas Bethune-Baker in 1910. The Global Lepidoptera Names Index considers it to be a synonym of Cotana lunulata. It is found in New Guinea.

Males are similar to Cotana lunulata, but are larger and the outer one-third of the forewings is much paler and more yellow. The hindwings are much brighter yellow and all transverse lines are more distinct. Females are also similar to Cotana lunulata, but are much darker and the white patch in the basal one-third of the forewings is reduced to a small dot. The postdiscal bands are much narrower and more cream coloured.
