= Parajana lamani =

Scientific classification
- Kingdom: Animalia
- Phylum: Arthropoda
- Class: Insecta
- Order: Lepidoptera
- Family: Eupterotidae
- Genus: Parajana
- Species: P. lamani

Binomial name
- Parajana lamani Aurivillius, 1906

Species of moth

Parajana lamani is a moth in the family Eupterotidae described by Per Olof Christopher Aurivillius in 1906. The Global Lepidoptera Names Index has Parajana gabunica listed as a synonym of this species. It is found in the Democratic Republic of the Congo (Kongo Central, Orientale) and Togo.
