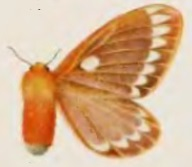
- Female
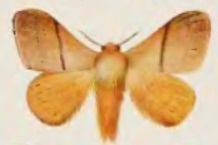
- Male

Scientific classification
- Kingdom: Animalia
- Phylum: Arthropoda
- Class: Insecta
- Order: Lepidoptera
- Family: Eupterotidae
- Genus: Cotana
- Species: C. joiceyi

Binomial name
- Cotana joiceyi Rothschild, 1917

= Cotana joiceyi =

Species of moth

Cotana joiceyi is a moth in the family Eupterotidae. It was described by Walter Rothschild in 1917. It is found in New Guinea.

The wingspan is about 48 mm for males and 60 mm for females. Males are similar to Cotana unistrigata, but the basal half of the forewings has a buffish-cream colour, and the outer half is buffish grey. Furthermore, the median band is more oblique and brown (not black) and there is no stigma. Females differ from C. unistrigata in being smaller and the white patch and postdiscal bands are much larger and pure white. Furthermore, the nervures and margins are deep bright yellow and the thorax and costal area are rufous orange.
