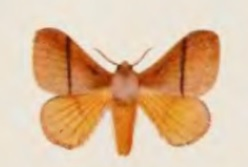

Scientific classification
- Kingdom: Animalia
- Phylum: Arthropoda
- Class: Insecta
- Order: Lepidoptera
- Family: Eupterotidae
- Genus: Cotana
- Species: C. germana

Binomial name
- Cotana germana Rothschild, 1917

= Cotana germana =

Species of moth

Cotana germana is a moth in the family Eupterotidae. It was described by Walter Rothschild in 1917. It is found in New Guinea.

Males are similar to Cotana rubrescens, but the forewings are paler and less chestnut brown, and the transverse bands are much thinner and less strongly marked. The hindwings are much paler and almost patternless and the transverse band of the forewings is also more concavely curved. Females have liver-chestnut forewings with a white spot below the median in the basal one-third of the wing, a median slightly sinuate darker band and the nervures and marginal line are yellow. There is a postdiscal coalescent band of intranervular white wedge-shaped patches truncated distad. The hindwings are similar in ground colour, but the band of white patches is lunate.
