= Cotana affinis =

Scientific classification
- Kingdom: Animalia
- Phylum: Arthropoda
- Class: Insecta
- Order: Lepidoptera
- Family: Eupterotidae
- Genus: Cotana
- Species: C. affinis

Binomial name
- Cotana affinis Rothschild, 1917

Species of moth

Cotana affinis is a moth in the family Eupterotidae. It was described by Walter Rothschild in 1917. It is found in New Guinea.

== Description ==
The wingspan is about 50 mm. The basal one-third of the forewings is cream white with an oblique subbasal chocolate band and a broad dark-chocolate antemedian band. In between these two bands is a chocolate stigma with a white centre. The outer two-thirds of the wing are creamy grey washed with brown and with a postmedian cream-grey band edged outwardly by a crenulated chocolate hairline. There is also a large chocolate patch above vein 6. The hindwings are orange yellow, but bright orange at the base and on the inner area. There are two faint transverse shadow lines.
