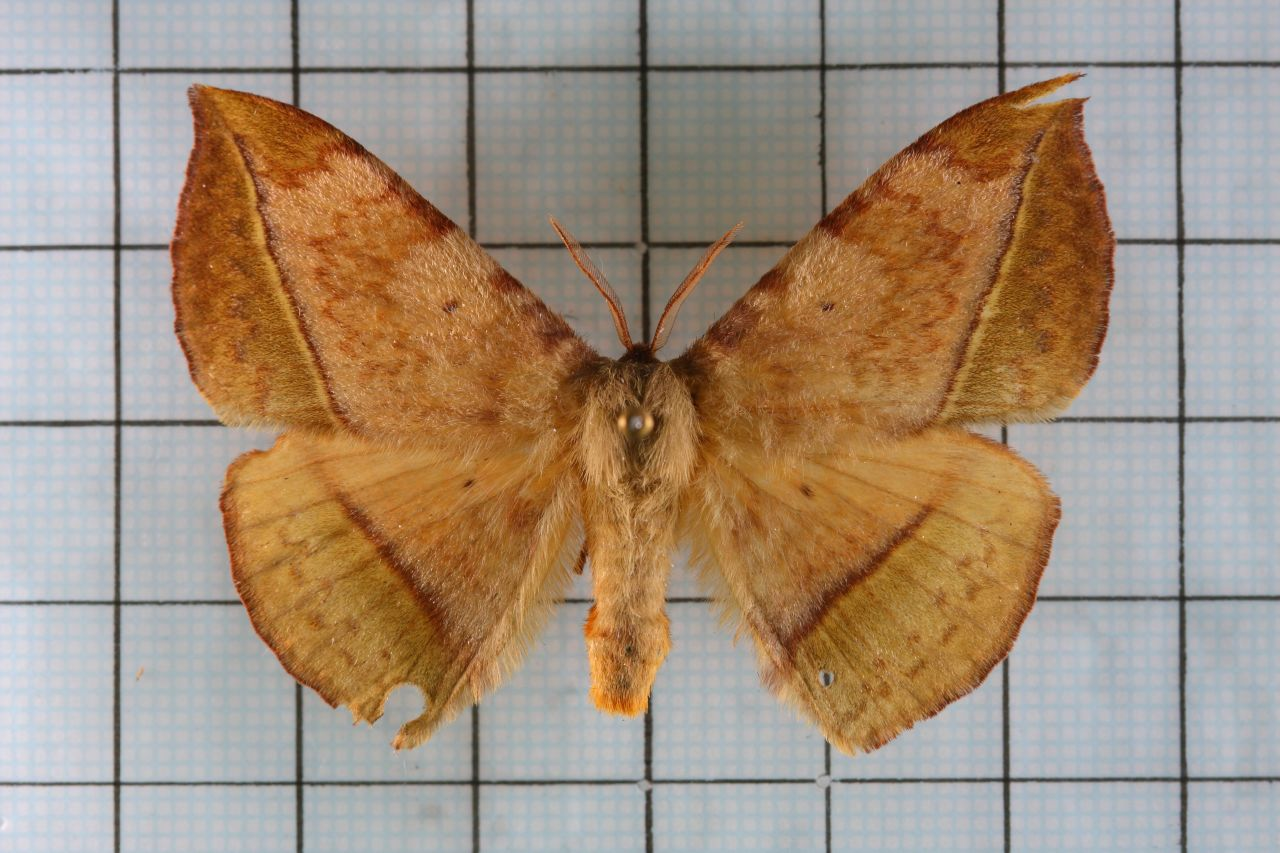
- Apha arisana

Scientific classification
- Kingdom: Animalia
- Phylum: Arthropoda
- Class: Insecta
- Order: Lepidoptera
- Family: Eupterotidae
- Genus: Apha; Walker, 1855

= Apha =

Genus of moths

Apha is a genus of moths in the family Eupterotidae.

== Species ==
- Apha aequalis (Felder, 1874)
- Apha arisana Matsumura, 1927
- Apha floralis Butler, 1881
- Apha horishana Matsumura, 1927
- Apha huabeiana Yang, 1978
- Apha kantonensis Mell, 1929
- Apha strix Bryk, 1944
- Apha subdives Walker, 1855

== Former species ==
- Apha gonioptera West, 1932
