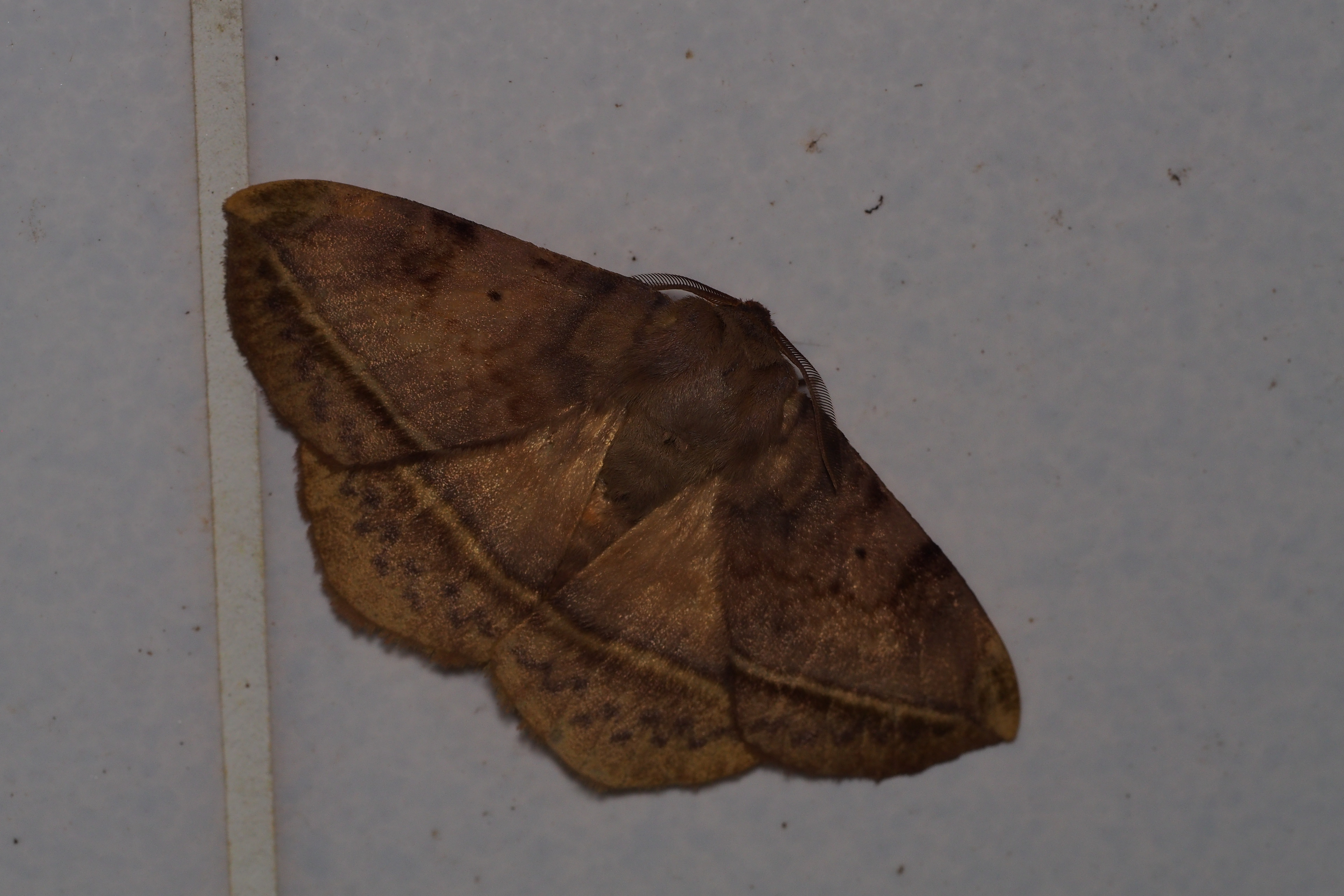

Scientific classification
- Kingdom: Animalia
- Phylum: Arthropoda
- Class: Insecta
- Order: Lepidoptera
- Family: Eupterotidae
- Genus: Apha
- Species: A. aequalis

Binomial name
- Apha aequalis (Felder, 1874)

Synonyms
- Brachytera aequalis Felder, 1874

= Apha aequalis =

Species of moth

Apha aequalis is a moth in the family Eupterotidae. It was described by Felder in 1874. It is found in Japan.

The wingspan is 45–59 mm.

The larvae feed on a wide range of plants, including Lonicera japonica.
