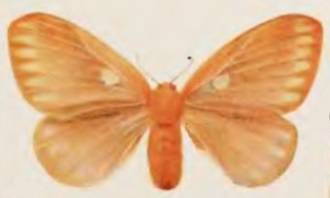

Scientific classification
- Kingdom: Animalia
- Phylum: Arthropoda
- Class: Insecta
- Order: Lepidoptera
- Family: Eupterotidae
- Genus: Cotana
- Species: C. rosselliana

Binomial name
- Cotana rosselliana Rothschild, 1917

Synonyms
- Cotana continentalis Rothschild, 1932; Cotana diluta Rothschild, 1917

= Cotana rosselliana =

Species of moth

Cotana rosselliana is a moth in the family Eupterotidae. It was described by Walter Rothschild in 1917. It is found in New Guinea.

The wingspan is about 54 mm for males and 65 mm for females. The basal three-fifths of the forewings of the males is orange brown, while the outer two-fifths are paler more suffused with yellow. There is a broad irregular subbasal dark-brown band followed by a dull yellow stigma ringed with dark brown and a curved median black-brown band, as well as three crenulate black lines of varying sharpness in outer the two-fifths and a dark-brown patch below the apex. Females have saffron-yellow forewings with a round white spot below the median in the basal one-third and there is a crenulate lunate transverse postdiscal white band. The hindwings are saffron yellow with a lunate postdiscal white line.
