= Tissanga zambiana =

Scientific classification
- Kingdom: Animalia
- Phylum: Arthropoda
- Class: Insecta
- Order: Lepidoptera
- Family: Eupterotidae
- Genus: Tissanga
- Species: T. zambiana

Binomial name
- Tissanga zambiana Darge & Minetti, 2012

Species of moth

Tissanga zambiana is a moth in the family Eupterotidae. It was described by Philippe Darge and Robert Minetti in 2012. It is found in Malawi and Zambia.
