= Striginiana agrippa =

Scientific classification
- Kingdom: Animalia
- Phylum: Arthropoda
- Class: Insecta
- Order: Lepidoptera
- Family: Eupterotidae
- Genus: Striginiana
- Species: S. agrippa

Binomial name
- Striginiana agrippa (Weymer, 1909)

Synonyms
- Jana agrippa Weymer, 1909

Species of insect

Striginiana agrippa is a moth of the family Eupterotidae. It can be found in Tanzania.

The body of the male of this species has a length of 46 millimetres (1.8 in), the length of its forewings is 72 mm (2.8 in) and its wingspan 130 mm (5.1 in). The forewings are yellowish-brown.
