= Pseudoganisa gonioptera =

Scientific classification
- Kingdom: Animalia
- Phylum: Arthropoda
- Class: Insecta
- Order: Lepidoptera
- Family: Eupterotidae
- Genus: Pseudoganisa
- Species: P. gonioptera

Binomial name
- Pseudoganisa gonioptera (West, 1932)

Synonyms
- Apha gonioptera West, 1932

Species of moth

Pseudoganisa gonioptera is a moth in the family Eupterotidae. It was described by West in 1932. It is found in the Philippines (Luzon, Mindoro, Palawan, Leyte, Samar). The Global Lepidoptera Names Index lists this name as a synonym of Pseudoganisa currani.
