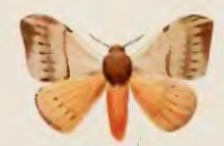
- Male
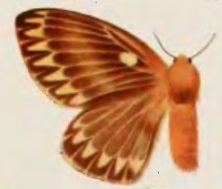
- Female

Scientific classification
- Kingdom: Animalia
- Phylum: Arthropoda
- Class: Insecta
- Order: Lepidoptera
- Family: Eupterotidae
- Genus: Cotana
- Species: C. dubia

Binomial name
- Cotana dubia (Bethune-Baker, 1904)

Synonyms
- Nervicompressa dubia Bethune-Baker, 1904; Hypercydas doricrana Bethune-Baker, 1908

= Cotana dubia =

Species of moth

Cotana dubia is a moth in the family Eupterotidae. It was described by George Thomas Bethune-Baker in 1904. It is found in New Guinea.

The wingspan is about 72 mm for males and 41 mm for females. Both wings of the males are darkish red-brown, the forewings with a broad oblique median band and a very broad curved postmedian band of darker ground colour, the latter having a scalloped outer edge, adjoining which is a series of broad spear-head ochreous marks up to the termen. There is also a large round ochreous spot at the end of the cell and all the veins are distinctly ochreous. The hindwings are like the forewings, but without the cell spot. Females have pale buff forewings, but darker in the terminal area and with a waved purplish medial stripe. There is a curved indefinite mauve suffused line, edged obscurely with yellowish and with a fine very indistinct dark margin, beyond which is a row of dark dashes on each vein. There is also a subapical purplish wedge-shaped terminal patch. The hindwings are orange yellow, with a lunulate postmedial line, followed by a row of dark dashes on each vein.
