= Gonojana dimidiata =

Scientific classification
- Kingdom: Animalia
- Phylum: Arthropoda
- Class: Insecta
- Order: Lepidoptera
- Family: Eupterotidae
- Genus: Gonojana
- Species: G. dimidiata

Binomial name
- Gonojana dimidiata Aurivillius, 1893

Synonyms
- Epijana tenuis Holland, 1893

Species of moth

Gonojana dimidiata is a moth in the family Eupterotidae. It was described by Per Olof Christopher Aurivillius in 1893. It is found in Cameroon and Gabon.

The wingspan about 45 mm. The forewings are plumbeous (lead colored), crossed by a dark brown, straight line, which runs from the costa to the inner margin about three-fourths of their length from the base. The hindwings are orange red with the outer third broadly and uniformly margined with dark plumbeous brown.
