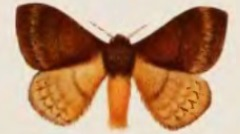

Scientific classification
- Kingdom: Animalia
- Phylum: Arthropoda
- Class: Insecta
- Order: Lepidoptera
- Family: Eupterotidae
- Genus: Cotana
- Species: C. lunulata

Binomial name
- Cotana lunulata (Bethune-Baker, 1904)

Synonyms
- Nervicompressa lunulata Bethune-Baker, 1904; Cotana lunulata ab. unicolor Rothschild, 1932; Cotana montium Rothschild, 1932; Cotana borealis Rothschild, 1932; Cotana lunulata occidentalis Rothschild, 1917; Cotana lunulata satisbona Rothschild, 1917

= Cotana lunulata =

Species of moth

Cotana lunulata is a moth in the family Eupterotidae. It was described by George Thomas Bethune-Baker in 1904. It is found in New Guinea.

The wingspan is about 45–54 mm. Females are very similar to those of Cotana meeki, but are paler and more rufescent on the wings, while the postdiscal white bands are much narrower.
