= Neopreptos marathusa =

Scientific classification
- Kingdom: Animalia
- Phylum: Arthropoda
- Clade: Pancrustacea
- Class: Insecta
- Order: Lepidoptera
- Family: Eupterotidae
- Genus: Neopreptos
- Species: N. marathusa

Binomial name
- Neopreptos marathusa (H. Druce, 1886)

Synonyms
- Coloradia marathusa H. Druce, 1886

Species of moth

Neopreptos marathusa is a moth in the family Eupterotidae. It was described by Herbert Druce in 1886. It is found in Costa Rica.

The wingspan is about 64 mm for males and 83 mm for females. The forewings and hindwings of the males are dark reddish brown, lightest near the base of the forewings. The forewings have a slightly greyish transverse line crossing from the costal margin to the anal angle, and with several obscure dark markings between it and the outer margin. The hindwings are rather darker. Females have uniform pale brown forewings and hindwings.
