= Apha strix =

Scientific classification
- Kingdom: Animalia
- Phylum: Arthropoda
- Class: Insecta
- Order: Lepidoptera
- Family: Eupterotidae
- Genus: Apha
- Species: A. strix

Binomial name
- Apha strix Bryk, 1944

Synonyms
- Sphingognatha strix Bryk, 1944

Species of moth

Apha strix is a moth in the family Eupterotidae. It was described by Felix Bryk in 1944. It is found in Myanmar.
