= Cotana tenebricosa =

Scientific classification
- Kingdom: Animalia
- Phylum: Arthropoda
- Class: Insecta
- Order: Lepidoptera
- Family: Eupterotidae
- Genus: Cotana
- Species: C. tenebricosa

Binomial name
- Cotana tenebricosa (Hering, 1931)

Synonyms
- Nervicompressa tenebricosa Hering, 1931

Species of moth

Cotana tenebricosa is a moth in the family Eupterotidae. It was described by Hering in 1931. It is found in New Guinea.
