= Poloma nigromaculata =

Scientific classification
- Domain: Eukaryota
- Kingdom: Animalia
- Phylum: Arthropoda
- Class: Insecta
- Order: Lepidoptera
- Family: Eupterotidae
- Genus: Poloma
- Species: P. nigromaculata

Binomial name
- Poloma nigromaculata (Aurivillius, 1893)

Synonyms
- Phyllalia nigromaculata Aurivillius, 1893; Stenoglene nahor Druce, 1896

Species of moth

Poloma nigromaculata is a moth in the family Eupterotidae. It was described by Per Olof Christopher Aurivillius in 1893. It is found in South Africa.

== Description ==
The forewings are dark smoky brown, palest along the outer margin and crossed beyond the middle from the costal to the inner margin by two fine waved dark brown lines. There are three small angular-shaped black spots close to the apex. The hindwings are pale brownish fawn, darkest at the base and along the inner margin and with two fine brown lines across the wing below the middle, extending from the apex to the inner margin.
