= Striginiana camerunica =

Scientific classification
- Kingdom: Animalia
- Phylum: Arthropoda
- Class: Insecta
- Order: Lepidoptera
- Family: Eupterotidae
- Genus: Striginiana
- Species: S. camerunica

Binomial name
- Striginiana camerunica (Aurivillius, 1893)

Synonyms
- Jana strigina var. camerunica Aurivillius, 1893

Species of moth

Striginiana camerunica is a moth in the family Eupterotidae. It was described by Per Olof Christopher Aurivillius in 1893. It is found in Cameroon and in Orientale Province of the Democratic Republic of the Congo.
