= Marmaroplegma conspersa =

Scientific classification
- Kingdom: Animalia
- Phylum: Arthropoda
- Class: Insecta
- Order: Lepidoptera
- Family: Eupterotidae
- Genus: Marmaroplegma
- Species: M. conspersa

Binomial name
- Marmaroplegma conspersa Aurivillius, 1921

Species of moth

Marmaroplegma conspersa is a moth in the family Eupterotidae described by Per Olof Christopher Aurivillius in 1921. It is found in South Africa.
