= Gonojana crowleyi =

Scientific classification
- Kingdom: Animalia
- Phylum: Arthropoda
- Class: Insecta
- Order: Lepidoptera
- Family: Eupterotidae
- Genus: Gonojana
- Species: G. crowleyi

Binomial name
- Gonojana crowleyi (Aurivillius, 1904)

Synonyms
- Viana crowleyi Aurivillius, 1904

Species of moth

Gonojana crowleyi is a moth in the family Eupterotidae. It was described by Per Olof Christopher Aurivillius in 1904. It is found in Kenya, Sierra Leone and Uganda.

The wingspan about 45 mm. The forewings are dark reddish brown with a fuscous mark on the discocellulars and a nearly straight transverse line behind the middle from the costa near the apex to the hind margin near the anal angle. The hindwings are ochreous yellow, tinged with brown at the inner margin and behind the middle with a faintly curved brownish transverse line.
