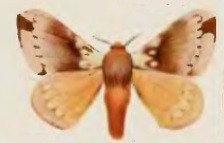
- Male
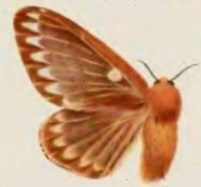
- Female

Scientific classification
- Kingdom: Animalia
- Phylum: Arthropoda
- Class: Insecta
- Order: Lepidoptera
- Family: Eupterotidae
- Genus: Cotana
- Species: C. variegata

Binomial name
- Cotana variegata Rothschild, 1917

= Cotana variegata =

Species of moth

Cotana variegata is a moth in the family Eupterotidae. It was described by Walter Rothschild in 1917. It is found in New Guinea.

The wingspan is about 47 mm for males and 74 mm for females. The basal one-fourth of the forewings of the males is cream white, with an oblique chocolate streak, below which is a looped zigzag line which forms a white stigma just below the streak. There is an antemedian dark-chocolate transverse band and the central one-third of the wing is pale chocolate, becoming paler distad. The outer one-third is creamy grey with a crenulate postdiscal brown line, a dark-chocolate spot before the tornus and a quadrate dark-chocolate patch between vein seven and half-way between veins six and five. The hindwings are orange with a postmedian transverse crenulate dark band beyond which is a similar lunate one. Females have chocolate-rufous-brown forewings with yellow nervures and a round white spot below the cell in the basal one-third of the wing. There is a slightly curved median darker chocolate band and a postdiscal row of eight intranervular wedge-shaped white patches. The hindwing ground colour and median band are similar, but with a postdiscal row of wedge-shaped golden-yellow patches.
