= Cotana castaneorufa =

Scientific classification
- Kingdom: Animalia
- Phylum: Arthropoda
- Class: Insecta
- Order: Lepidoptera
- Family: Eupterotidae
- Genus: Cotana
- Species: C. castaneorufa

Binomial name
- Cotana castaneorufa Rothschild, 1913

Species of moth

Cotana castaneorufa is a moth in the family Eupterotidae described by Walter Rothschild in 1913. It is found in New Guinea.

The wingspan is about 49 mm. The forewings are chocolate liver brown with a tiny white dot at the base and an antemedian buff stigma, followed by a buff transverse band that is distinct and broad at the costal half and narrows, becoming indistinct on the inner half. There is a somewhat indistinct postdiscal transverse greyish-olive outwardly curved chain of half moons. The hindwings are orange, the outer two-thirds almost completely suffused with liver brown. The hindwings have a brown transverse line in the basal one-third and a somewhat sinuate orange one in the outer one-third.
