= Marmaroplegma unicolor =

Scientific classification
- Kingdom: Animalia
- Phylum: Arthropoda
- Class: Insecta
- Order: Lepidoptera
- Family: Eupterotidae
- Genus: Marmaroplegma
- Species: M. unicolor

Binomial name
- Marmaroplegma unicolor Janse, 1915

Species of moth

Marmaroplegma unicolor is a moth in the family Eupterotidae. It was described by Anthonie Johannes Theodorus Janse in 1915. It is found in South Africa.

== Description ==
The wingspan is about 56 mm. The forewings are chestnut brown, without any markings, except that the costa near the base and the hairs at the base of the inner margin are more of a clay colour, while the veins are marked by a slightly darker irroration (sprinkling). The hindwings are cinnamon buff, sparingly irrorated on the terminal area and more thickly on the terminal one-third of the veins with chestnut brown.
