= Apha huabeiana =

Scientific classification
- Kingdom: Animalia
- Phylum: Arthropoda
- Class: Insecta
- Order: Lepidoptera
- Family: Eupterotidae
- Genus: Apha
- Species: A. huabeiana

Binomial name
- Apha huabeiana Yang, 1978

Species of moth

Apha huabeiana is a moth in the family Eupterotidae. It was described by Yang in 1978. It is found in China.
