= Tissanga kiboriana =

Scientific classification
- Kingdom: Animalia
- Phylum: Arthropoda
- Clade: Pancrustacea
- Class: Insecta
- Order: Lepidoptera
- Family: Eupterotidae
- Genus: Tissanga
- Species: T. kiboriana

Binomial name
- Tissanga kiboriana Basquin & Darge, 2011

Species of moth

Tissanga kiboriana is a moth in the family Eupterotidae. It was described by Patrick Basquin and Philippe Darge in 2011. It is found in Tanzania.
