= Apha kantonensis =

Scientific classification
- Kingdom: Animalia
- Phylum: Arthropoda
- Class: Insecta
- Order: Lepidoptera
- Family: Eupterotidae
- Genus: Apha
- Species: A. kantonensis

Binomial name
- Apha kantonensis Mell, 1929

Species of moth

Apha kantonensis is a moth in the family Eupterotidae. It was described by Rudolf Mell in 1929. It is found in China, Cambodia and Vietnam.
