= Poloma castanea =

Scientific classification
- Kingdom: Animalia
- Phylum: Arthropoda
- Class: Insecta
- Order: Lepidoptera
- Family: Eupterotidae
- Genus: Poloma
- Species: P. castanea

Binomial name
- Poloma castanea Aurivillius, 1901

Species of moth

Poloma castanea is a moth in the family Eupterotidae. It was described by Per Olof Christopher Aurivillius in 1901. It is found in South Africa.
