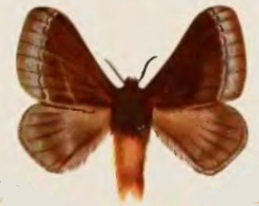
- Male
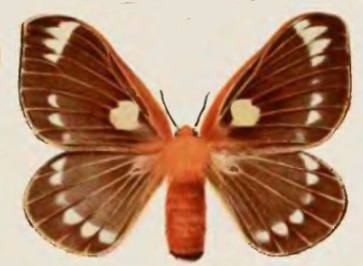
- Female

Scientific classification
- Kingdom: Animalia
- Phylum: Arthropoda
- Clade: Pancrustacea
- Class: Insecta
- Order: Lepidoptera
- Family: Eupterotidae
- Genus: Cotana
- Species: C. biagi

Binomial name
- Cotana biagi (Bethune-Baker, 1908)

Synonyms
- Paracydas biagi Bethune-Baker, 1908

= Cotana biagi =

Species of moth

Cotana biagi is a moth in the family Eupterotidae. It was described by George Thomas Bethune-Baker in 1908. It is found in New Guinea.

The wingspan is about 91 millimetres (3.6 in). The forewings are deep chocolate brown, with the basal three-fourths of the costa, the base of the wing and the subcostal area bright rufous. The nervures are rufous and there is a large antemedian primrose-yellow patch of raised scales on and between veins two to five. There is also a large postmedian curved white patch running out distad between the nervures into wedge-shaped projections. The margin is rufous yellow. The hindwings are deep chocolate, with the base of the wing and abdominal area rufous clothed with long hairs. The nervures are rufous and there is a row of six postmedian white patches. The margin is rufous yellow.

== Subspecies ==
- Cotana biagi biagi
- Cotana biagi occidentalis Rothschild, 1932 (junior primary homonym)
