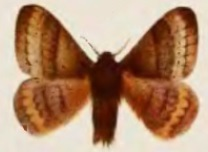

Scientific classification
- Kingdom: Animalia
- Phylum: Arthropoda
- Class: Insecta
- Order: Lepidoptera
- Family: Eupterotidae
- Genus: Cotana
- Species: C. brunnescens

Binomial name
- Cotana brunnescens Rothschild, 1917

= Cotana brunnescens =

Species of moth

Cotana brunnescens is a moth in the family Eupterotidae. It was described by Walter Rothschild in 1917. It is found in New Guinea.

The wingspan is about 49 mm for males and 77 mm for females. The forewings of the males are deep chocolate liver brown with two indistinct darker postmedian bands beyond which is a row of black dots. The hindwings are similar. Females have pale chocolate liver-brown forewings, with the basal two-thirds of the costo-subcostal area suffused with cinnamon rufous and the nervures yellowish brown. There is a large cream-white patch below the middle of the cell and there is a postdiscal transverse band of eight intranervular cream-white patches, the upper five being wedge shaped, the lower three lunate. The terminal ends of the nervures are marked with orange. The hindwings are similar, but there are only six lunate cream-white patches in a band.
