= Striginiana nobilis =

Scientific classification
- Kingdom: Animalia
- Phylum: Arthropoda
- Class: Insecta
- Order: Lepidoptera
- Family: Eupterotidae
- Genus: Striginiana
- Species: S. nobilis

Binomial name
- Striginiana nobilis (Holland, 1893)

Synonyms
- Jana nobilis Strand, 1912

Species of moth

Striginiana nobilis is a moth in the family Eupterotidae. It was described by William Jacob Holland in 1893. It is found in Gabon.

== Description ==
The wingspan about 130 mm. The forewings are fawn, with the inner margin and the outer angle pale cinereous (ash grey). The wings are crossed before the base by a straight transverse line of dark brown, margined inwardly with pale cinereous. This is succeeded by a similar line which crosses the middle of the cell and is parallel to the first. There is a short linear brown line at the end of the cell defined inwardly by grey. Beyond the cell, there is a straight transverse dark brown line running from beyond the middle of the costa to the middle of the inner margin, where it nearly touches the line crossing the middle of the cell. This is defined inwardly by a broad, pale grey shade. This line is followed by another straight transverse line running from the costa three fourths of the distance from the base to the inner margin two-thirds of the distance from the base, defined inwardly by a pale grey line, which is interrupted on the nervules by ochraceous dots, marking the origin of a regular series of markings which lie on the side toward the base with their points towards the base, which are dark brown shaded with pale grey toward the margin. Beyond this dark brown line, the outer third of the wing is fawn marked by a subapical brown shading and a similarly submarginal shading near the outer angle, both fading inwardly into grey. The costa and the outer margin of the hindwings are fawn, but the inner margin and inner angle are broadly glaucous grey. There is a broad patch of black hairs at the base followed by a black incomplete transverse band running from the inner margin to beyond the end of the cell, and gradually widening from the inner margin. This is followed by a narrower black line which is very obscure upon the costa, but gradually widens toward the inner margin and becomes more distinct and terminates upon the internal vein. This is again followed by a very broad, dark brown band which runs from the costa before the outer angle to the inner margin, its inner edge being straight, its outer edge curved and denticulate, and defined by a pale grey waved line.

The Global Lepidoptera Names Index has this name as a synonym of Jana strigina.
