= Cotana eichhorni =

Scientific classification
- Kingdom: Animalia
- Phylum: Arthropoda
- Class: Insecta
- Order: Lepidoptera
- Family: Eupterotidae
- Genus: Cotana
- Species: C. eichhorni

Binomial name
- Cotana eichhorni Rothschild, 1932

Species of moth

Cotana eichhorni is a moth in the family Eupterotidae. It was described by Rothschild in 1932 and is found in New Guinea.
