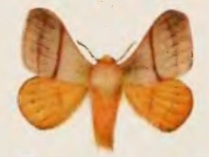

Scientific classification
- Domain: Eukaryota
- Kingdom: Animalia
- Phylum: Arthropoda
- Class: Insecta
- Order: Lepidoptera
- Family: Eupterotidae
- Genus: Cotana
- Species: C. kebeae

Binomial name
- Cotana kebeae (Bethune-Baker, 1904)

Synonyms
- Nervicompressa kebeae Bethune-Baker, 1904

= Cotana kebeae =

Species of moth

Cotana kebeae is a moth in the family Eupterotidae. It was described by George Thomas Bethune-Baker in 1904. It is found in New Guinea.

The wingspan is 48–56 mm. The forewings are cinnamon brown, but paler in the medial area and with a straight oblique dark purplish-brown medial stripe, followed by a slightly curved narrower similar coloured postmedial line edged with paler externally. In this edging is a row of dark dots on each vein. The apex has a darker suffusion. The hindwings are orange, with a trace of a medial line and a suffused lunulated postmedial stripe which is edged with pale externally. There is a row of dark dots on the veins.

== Subspecies ==
- Cotana kebeae kebeae
- Cotana kebeae grandis Rothschild, 1917
