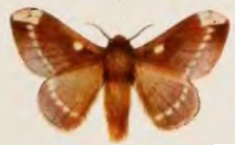
- Male
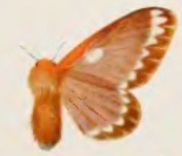
- Female

Scientific classification
- Kingdom: Animalia
- Phylum: Arthropoda
- Class: Insecta
- Order: Lepidoptera
- Family: Eupterotidae
- Genus: Cotana
- Species: C. albomaculata

Binomial name
- Cotana albomaculata (Bethune-Baker, 1904)

Synonyms
- Nervicompressa albomaculata Bethune-Baker, 1904; Epicydas ovata Bethune-Baker, 1908

= Cotana albomaculata =

Species of moth

Cotana albomaculata is a moth in the family Eupterotidae. It was described by George Thomas Bethune-Baker in 1904. It is found in New Guinea.

The wingspan is about 58 mm. Both wings are pale, semitransparent reddish, the forewings have a large ovate white spot at the end of the cell and there is a whitish scalloped subterminal stripe, the scallops extended into spear-head points in the apical area. The hindwings are similar to the forewings but without the cell spot.
