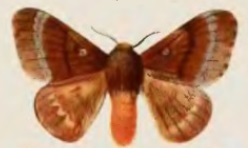

Scientific classification
- Kingdom: Animalia
- Phylum: Arthropoda
- Class: Insecta
- Order: Lepidoptera
- Family: Eupterotidae
- Genus: Cotana
- Species: C. postpallida

Binomial name
- Cotana postpallida (Rothschild, 1917)

Synonyms
- Paracydas postpallida Rothschild, 1917

= Cotana postpallida =

Species of moth

Cotana postpallida is a moth in the family Eupterotidae. It was described by Walter Rothschild in 1917. It is found in New Guinea.

The wingspan is about 53 mm. The forewings are deep liver brown with a large antemedian grey and black stigma, a median transverse black band and the outer one-third with a somewhat ill-defined postdiscal grey band and grey cloudings beyond. The basal half of the hindwings is orange suffused with brown and crossed by a dark band, while the outer half is dull brown slightly suffused with orange and crossed by a greyish-olive band edged with serrated brownish cloud lines.
