= Tissanga murphyi =

Scientific classification
- Kingdom: Animalia
- Phylum: Arthropoda
- Class: Insecta
- Order: Lepidoptera
- Family: Eupterotidae
- Genus: Tissanga
- Species: T. murphyi

Binomial name
- Tissanga murphyi Bouyer, 2012

Species of moth

Tissanga murphyi is a moth in the family Eupterotidae. It was described by Thierry Bouyer in 2012. It is found in Malawi.
