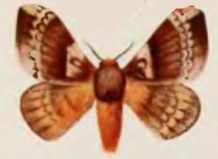

Scientific classification
- Kingdom: Animalia
- Phylum: Arthropoda
- Class: Insecta
- Order: Lepidoptera
- Family: Eupterotidae
- Genus: Cotana
- Species: C. aroa

Binomial name
- Cotana aroa (Bethune-Baker, 1904)

Synonyms
- Nervicompressa aroa Bethune-Baker, 1904

= Cotana aroa =

Species of moth

Cotana aroa is a moth in the family Eupterotidae. It was described by George Thomas Bethune-Baker in 1904. It is found in New Guinea.

The wingspan is about 71 mm. The forewings are chocolate brown, with yellow nervures and a large yellow patch in the basal one-third of the wing below the cell. There is a postmedian band of intranervular coalescent golden-yellow patches, the upper four wedge shaped, the lower four arrowhead shaped, the points of all truncated. The hindwings are the same ground colour, but with only six patches in the postmedian band, all of which are arrowhead shaped, the lower three only having their points truncated.
