= Cotana splendida =

Scientific classification
- Kingdom: Animalia
- Phylum: Arthropoda
- Class: Insecta
- Order: Lepidoptera
- Family: Eupterotidae
- Genus: Cotana
- Species: C. splendida

Binomial name
- Cotana splendida Rothschild, 1932

Species of moth

Cotana splendida is a moth in the family Eupterotidae. It was described by Rothschild in 1932. It is found in New Guinea.
