= Gonojana magnifica =

Scientific classification
- Kingdom: Animalia
- Phylum: Arthropoda
- Class: Insecta
- Order: Lepidoptera
- Family: Eupterotidae
- Genus: Gonojana
- Species: G. magnifica

Binomial name
- Gonojana magnifica (Rothschild, 1917)

Synonyms
- Viana magnifica Rothschild, 1917; Vianga magnifica Rothschild, 1917

Species of moth

Gonojana magnifica is a moth in the family Eupterotidae. It was described by Rothschild in 1917. It is found in Nigeria.

The wingspan about 67 mm. The forewings are thinly scaled purplish chocolate with a whitish streak on the discocellulars and a darker postmedian line inside of which are varying clouded areas of whitish scales. The hindwings are orange-rufous, with the outer one-third purplish chocolate.
