= Neopreptos clazomenia =

Scientific classification
- Kingdom: Animalia
- Phylum: Arthropoda
- Class: Insecta
- Order: Lepidoptera
- Family: Eupterotidae
- Genus: Neopreptos
- Species: N. clazomenia

Binomial name
- Neopreptos clazomenia (H. Druce, 1886)

Synonyms
- Coloradia clazomenia H. Druce, 1886

Species of moth

Neopreptos clazomenia is a moth in the family Eupterotidae. It was described by Herbert Druce in 1886. It is found in Panama.

The wingspan is about 90 mm. The forewings and hindwings are uniform brownish black, with the veins rather darker. The forewings have an indistinct greyish marginal band extending from the apex to the anal angle.
