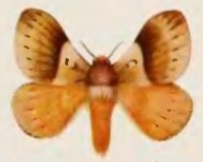

Scientific classification
- Domain: Eukaryota
- Kingdom: Animalia
- Phylum: Arthropoda
- Class: Insecta
- Order: Lepidoptera
- Family: Eupterotidae
- Genus: Cotana
- Species: C. erectilinea

Binomial name
- Cotana erectilinea (Bethune-Baker, 1910)

Synonyms
- Nervicompressa erectilinea Bethune-Baker, 1910; Cotana erectilinea setakwensis Rothschild, 1917

= Cotana erectilinea =

Species of moth

Cotana erectilinea is a moth in the family Eupterotidae. It was described by George Thomas Bethune-Baker in 1910. It is found in New Guinea.

The wingspan is about 44 mm. The forewings are pale ochreous brown, with a small pale spot darkly encircled in the cell near the base, as well as an erect straight dark median line, beyond which the postmedian area is darker and terminates in a scalloped edge. The apex is also darker. The hindwings are pale orange-brown, with a trace of a darker median and curved postmedian line.
