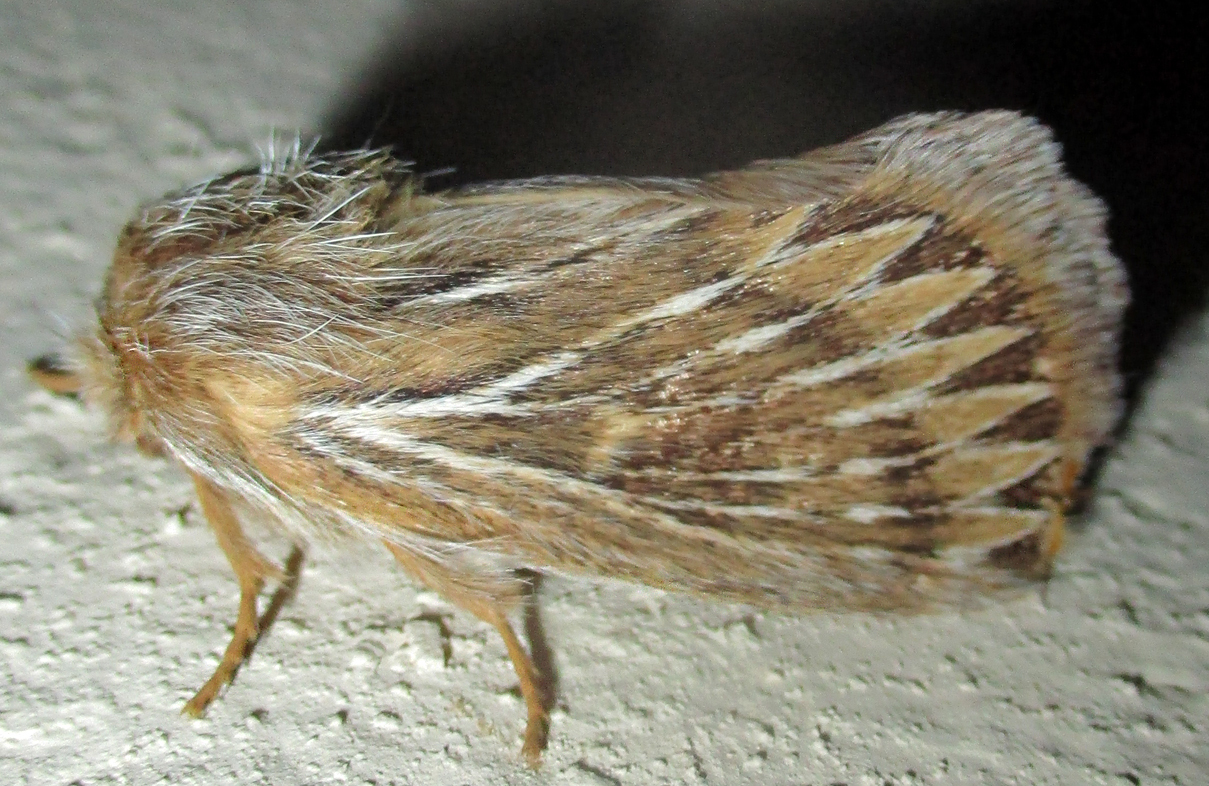

Scientific classification
- Kingdom: Animalia
- Phylum: Arthropoda
- Class: Insecta
- Order: Lepidoptera
- Family: Eupterotidae
- Genus: Marmaroplegma
- Species: M. paragarda

Binomial name
- Marmaroplegma paragarda Wallengren, 1860

Synonyms
- Rabdosia clio Fawcett, 1902

= Marmaroplegma paragarda =

Species of moth

Marmaroplegma paragarda, the speared monkey, is a moth in the family Eupterotidae. It was described by Wallengren in 1860. It is found in South Africa and Zimbabwe.

The wings are pale ochreous brown, the forewings crossed by a broad dark postmedial fascia. The veins are whitish, defined interiorly by some black irrorations (speckles). There is a marginal series of pale wedge-shaped lunules formed by the junction of the pale lines defining the veins, their apices reaching the margin of the wing. The extremity of the wing is darker beyond these lunules, and also near the base between veins one and two. The hindwings have marginal lunules similar to those on the forewings but paler and more indistinct.
