= Gonojana tristis =

Scientific classification
- Kingdom: Animalia
- Phylum: Arthropoda
- Class: Insecta
- Order: Lepidoptera
- Family: Eupterotidae
- Genus: Gonojana
- Species: G. tristis

Binomial name
- Gonojana tristis (Druce, 1896)

Synonyms
- Viana tristis Druce, 1896; Vianga tristis Druce, 1896

Species of moth

Gonojana tristis is a moth in the family Eupterotidae. It was described by Druce in 1896. It is found in Gambia.

The fore- and hindwings are uniform pale brown, both with a dark brown submarginal line extending from the costa to the inner margin. The head, antennae, thorax and abdomen are pale brown and the underside of the thorax and abdomen are pale yellow, while the legs are yellow.
