= Cotana bisecta =

Scientific classification
- Kingdom: Animalia
- Phylum: Arthropoda
- Class: Insecta
- Order: Lepidoptera
- Family: Eupterotidae
- Genus: Cotana
- Species: C. bisecta

Binomial name
- Cotana bisecta Rothschild, 1917

Species of insect

Cotana bisecta is a moth in the family Eupterotidae. It was described by Walter Rothschild in 1917. It is found in New Guinea.

The wingspan is about 52 mm. The forewings are dark brown, somewhat suffused with chestnut rufous and with a median black band, a postmedian indistinct blackish band beyond which is a lunate buffish band on the outside of which is a line of black dots joined by a chain of indistinct blackish lunules. The hindwings are orange yellow with an antemedian transverse line of sooty black and a median indistinct blackish cloud band followed by two lunulate bands.
