= Tissanga pretoriae =

Scientific classification
- Kingdom: Animalia
- Phylum: Arthropoda
- Class: Insecta
- Order: Lepidoptera
- Family: Eupterotidae
- Genus: Tissanga
- Species: T. pretoriae

Binomial name
- Tissanga pretoriae (Distant, 1892)

Synonyms
- Sangatissa pretoriae Distant, 1892

Species of moth

Tissanga pretoriae is a moth in the family Eupterotidae. It was described by William Lucas Distant in 1892. It is found in Lesotho, South Africa (Gauteng) and Zimbabwe.
