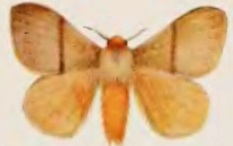

Scientific classification
- Kingdom: Animalia
- Phylum: Arthropoda
- Class: Insecta
- Order: Lepidoptera
- Family: Eupterotidae
- Genus: Cotana
- Species: C. bakeri

Binomial name
- Cotana bakeri (Joicey & Talbot, 1917)

Synonyms
- Nervicompressa bakeri Joicey & Talbot, 1917

= Cotana bakeri =

Species of moth

Cotana bakeri is a moth in the family Eupterotidae. It was described by James John Joicey and George Talbot in 1917. It is found in New Guinea.

The forewings are about 21 mm in length and are yellowish brown, with the apex and outer margin purplish brown, through faintly suffused below vein five. There is a prominent, straight brown discal line extending from the middle of the costa to the middle of the inner margin. The basal area features greyish-white scaling. The hindwings are pale rufous brown with a thin dark discal line, a faint post-discal line, and indications of a subterminal line.
