= Cotana pallidipascia =

Scientific classification
- Kingdom: Animalia
- Phylum: Arthropoda
- Clade: Pancrustacea
- Class: Insecta
- Order: Lepidoptera
- Family: Eupterotidae
- Genus: Cotana
- Species: C. pallidipascia

Binomial name
- Cotana pallidipascia Rothschild, 1917

Synonyms
- Cotana pallidifascia

Species of moth

Cotana pallidipascia is a moth in the family Eupterotidae. It was described by Walter Rothschild in 1917. It is found in New Guinea.

The wingspan is about 43 mm. The forewings are pale chocolate brown with a whitish dot in the basal one-fourth below the cell and there is an indistinct shadowy-black median line, as well as a postmedian double line which is greyish white inside and dark brown outside. The hindwings are paler chocolate brown with an indistinct postmedian line.
