= Poloma angulata =

Scientific classification
- Kingdom: Animalia
- Phylum: Arthropoda
- Class: Insecta
- Order: Lepidoptera
- Family: Eupterotidae
- Genus: Poloma
- Species: P. angulata

Binomial name
- Poloma angulata Walker, 1855

Synonyms
- Sarvena incompta Walker, 1865; Poloma janula (Felder, 1874)

Species of moth

Poloma angulata is a moth in the family Eupterotidae. It was described by Francis Walker in 1855. It is found in South Africa (KwaZulu-Natal, Western Cape).

== Description ==
Adults are brown, reddish ferruginous beneath. The wings have two zigzag slender middle brown bands, the outer one with a testaceous border on the outer side. These bands are more undulating on the underside. The forewings are several shades of brown, with a slightly curved testaceous band at one-fourth of the length, and with a very large reddish ferruginous patch along the middle part of the costa. This patch is deeply notched on its hind side, and contains a brown dot and a zigzag brown streak. The underside and hindwings are reddish ferruginous.

The larvae feed on Olinia ventosa and Canthium ventosum.
