= Gonojana velutina =

Scientific classification
- Kingdom: Animalia
- Phylum: Arthropoda
- Class: Insecta
- Order: Lepidoptera
- Family: Eupterotidae
- Genus: Gonojana
- Species: G. velutina

Binomial name
- Gonojana velutina (Walker, 1869)

Synonyms
- Viana velutina Walker, 1869

Species of moth

Gonojana velutina is a moth in the family Eupterotidae. It was described by Francis Walker in 1869. It is found in the Democratic Republic of the Congo.

Adults are fawn coloured, the forewings with an oblique, nearly straight postmedial line. The hindwings are ochraceous, except along the interior border.
