= Preptothauma =

Scientific classification
- Kingdom: Animalia
- Phylum: Arthropoda
- Class: Insecta
- Order: Lepidoptera
- Family: Eupterotidae
- Subfamily: Eupterotinae
- Genus: Preptothauma; Draudt, 1931
- Species: P. oxydiata

Binomial name
- Preptothauma oxydiata Draudt, 1931

Genus of moths

Preptothauma is a monotypic moth genus in the family Eupterotidae. Its only species, Preptothauma oxydiata, is found in Colombia. Both the genus and species were described by Max Wilhelm Karl Draudt in 1931.
