= Paramarane =

Scientific classification
- Kingdom: Animalia
- Phylum: Arthropoda
- Class: Insecta
- Order: Lepidoptera
- Family: Eupterotidae
- Genus: Paramarane; Bethune-Baker, 1910
- Species: P. pulchra

Binomial name
- Paramarane pulchra Bethune-Baker, 1910

Genus of moths

Paramarane is a monotypic moth genus in the family Eupterotidae. Its only species, Paramarane pulchra, is found in New Guinea. Both the genus and species were described by George Thomas Bethune-Baker in 1910.

The wingspan is about 51 mm. The forewings are silvery white with a yellow costa and with an oblique waved yellow postmedial line with a finer dark brown central line. The hindwings are uniform golden yellow.
