= Bantuana =

Scientific classification
- Kingdom: Animalia
- Phylum: Arthropoda
- Class: Insecta
- Order: Lepidoptera
- Family: Eupterotidae
- Genus: Bantuana; Distant, 1906
- Species: B. cregoei

Binomial name
- Bantuana cregoei Distant, 1906

Genus of moths

Bantuana is a monotypic moth genus in the family Eupterotidae described by William Lucas Distant in 1906. Its single species, Bantuana cregoei, described by the same author in the same year, is found in South Africa.
