= Pterocerota =

Scientific classification
- Kingdom: Animalia
- Phylum: Arthropoda
- Class: Insecta
- Order: Lepidoptera
- Family: Eupterotidae
- Subfamily: Janinae
- Genus: Pterocerota; Hampson, 1905
- Species: P. virginea

Binomial name
- Pterocerota virginea Hampson, 1905

Genus of moths

Pterocerota is a monotypic moth genus in the family Eupterotidae. Its single species, Pterocerota virginea, has been recorded from KwaZulu-Natal in South Africa. Both the genus and species were described by George Hampson in 1905.
