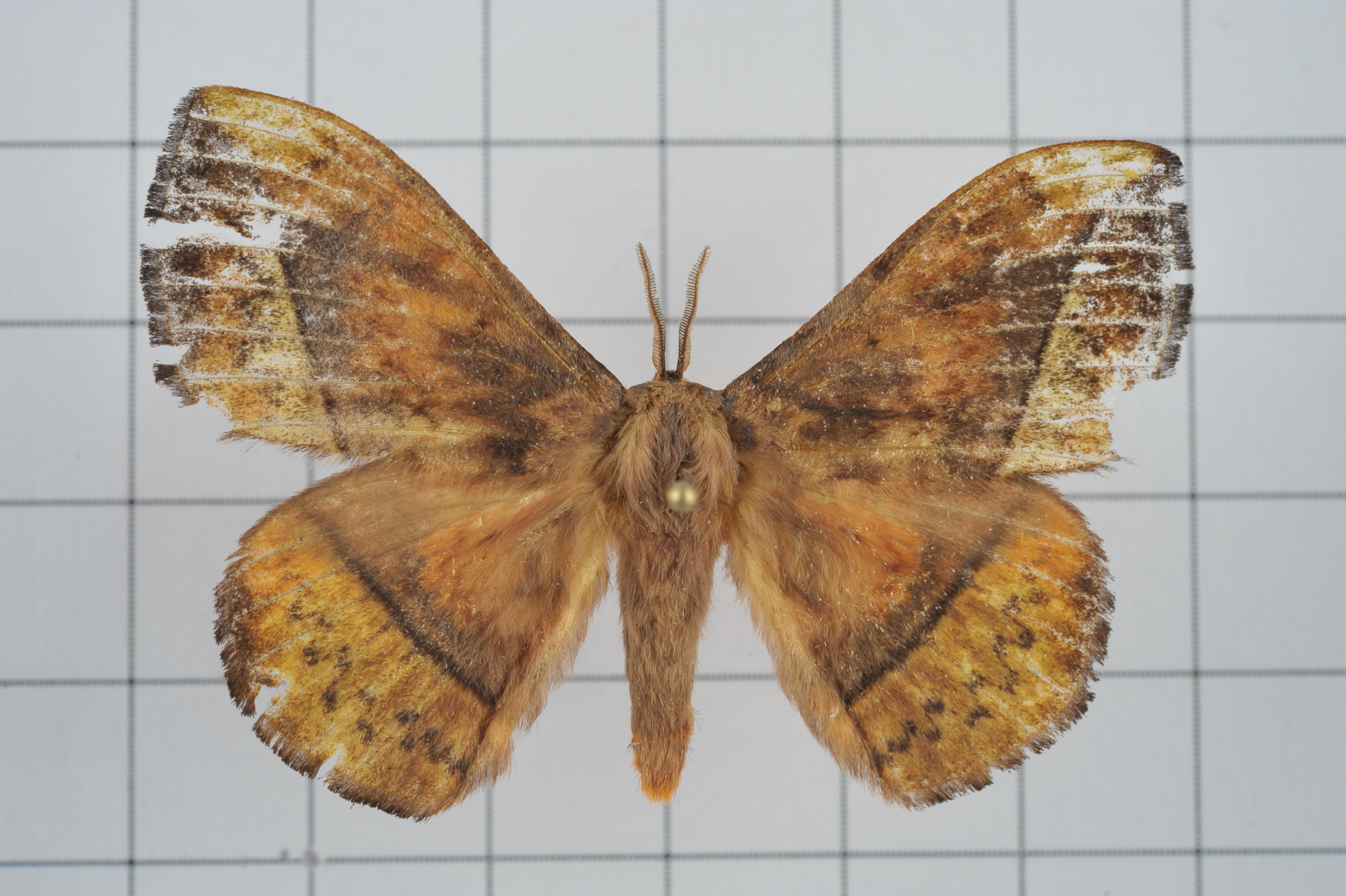

Scientific classification
- Kingdom: Animalia
- Phylum: Arthropoda
- Clade: Pancrustacea
- Class: Insecta
- Order: Lepidoptera
- Family: Eupterotidae
- Genus: Apha
- Species: A. horishana

Binomial name
- Apha horishana Matsumura, 1927

Synonyms
- Apha tychonooides Mell, 1930

= Apha horishana =

Species of moth

Apha horishana is a moth in the family Eupterotidae. It was described by Shōnen Matsumura in 1927. It is found in Taiwan and southern China.

The wingspan is 40–50 mm.
