= Schistissa =

Scientific classification
- Kingdom: Animalia
- Phylum: Arthropoda
- Class: Insecta
- Order: Lepidoptera
- Family: Eupterotidae
- Subfamily: Eupterotinae
- Genus: Schistissa; Aurivillius, 1901
- Species: S. uniformis

Binomial name
- Schistissa uniformis Aurivillius, 1901

Genus of moths

Schistissa is a monotypic moth genus in the family Eupterotidae. Its single species, Schistissa uniformis, is found in South Africa. Both the genus and species were described by Per Olof Christopher Aurivillius in 1901.
