= Cyrtojana =

Scientific classification
- Kingdom: Animalia
- Phylum: Arthropoda
- Clade: Pancrustacea
- Class: Insecta
- Order: Lepidoptera
- Family: Eupterotidae
- Subfamily: Eupterotinae
- Genus: Cyrtojana; Aurivillius, 1911
- Species: C. trilineata

Binomial name
- Cyrtojana trilineata Aurivillius, 1911

Synonyms
- Philotherma apithana Hering, 1928

Genus of moths

Cyrtojana is a monotypic moth genus in the family Eupterotidae. Its only species, Cyrtojana trilineata, is found in South Africa. Both the genus and species were described by Per Olof Christopher Aurivillius in 1911.
