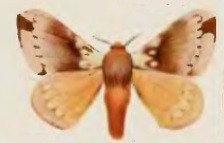
- Cotana variegata

Scientific classification
- Kingdom: Animalia
- Phylum: Arthropoda
- Clade: Pancrustacea
- Class: Insecta
- Order: Lepidoptera
- Family: Eupterotidae
- Subfamily: Panacelinae
- Genus: Cotana; Walker, 1865

Synonyms
- Hypercydas Turner, 1903; Nervicompressa Bethune-Baker, 1904; Epicydas Bethune-Baker, 1908; Paracydas Bethune-Baker, 1908

= Cotana =

Genus of moths

Cotana is a genus of moths in the family Eupterotidae.

== Species ==
- Cotana affinis Rothschild, 1917
- Cotana albaserrati (Bethune-Baker, 1910)
- Cotana albomaculata (Bethune-Baker, 1904)
- Cotana aroa (Bethune-Baker, 1904)
- Cotana bakeri (Joicey & Talbot, 1917)
- Cotana bisecta Rothschild, 1917
- Cotana brunnescens Rothschild, 1917
- Cotana castaneorufa Rothschild, 1917
- Cotana dubia (Bethune-Baker, 1904)
- Cotana eichhorni Rothschild, 1932
- Cotana erectilinea (Bethune-Baker, 1910)
- Cotana germana Rothschild, 1917
- Cotana joiceyi Rothschild, 1917
- Cotana kebeae (Bethune-Baker, 1904)
- Cotana lunulata (Bethune-Baker, 1904)
- Cotana meeki Rothschild, 1917
- Cotana neurina Turner, 1922
- Cotana pallidipascia Rothschild, 1917
- Cotana postpallida (Rothschild, 1917)
- Cotana rosselliana Rothschild, 1917
- Cotana rubrescens Walker, 1865
- Cotana serranotata (T.P. Lucas, 1894)
- Cotana splendida Rothschild, 1932
- Cotana tenebricosa (Hering, 1931)
- Cotana unistrigata (Bethune-Baker, 1904)
- Cotana variegata Rothschild, 1917

For "Paracydas" of some schemes see:

- Cotana biagi (Bethune-Baker, 1908)
- Cotana postpallida (Rothschild, 1917)

== Former species ==
- Cotana calliloma Turner, 1903
