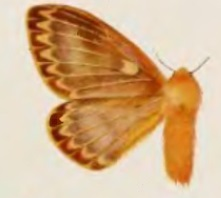
- Female
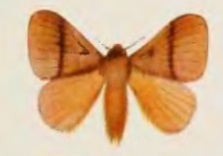
- Male

Scientific classification
- Kingdom: Animalia
- Phylum: Arthropoda
- Class: Insecta
- Order: Lepidoptera
- Family: Eupterotidae
- Genus: Cotana
- Species: C. rubrescens

Binomial name
- Cotana rubrescens Walker, 1865

Synonyms
- Hypercydas turneri Bethune Baker, 1908

= Cotana rubrescens =

Species of moth

Cotana rubrescens is a moth in the family Eupterotidae. It was described by Francis Walker in 1865. It is found in New Guinea.

The wingspan is about 72 mm. Both wings are red brown, the forewings with an ochreous pear-shaped spot at the end of the cell and a broad, slightly curved, oblique postmedian band of darker red, as well as a subterminal deeply dentate ochreous line, from whence to the termen the colour is more solid, the rest of the wing is somewhat thinly scaled. The hindwings are exactly like the forewings, but without the cell spot. The veins in both wings are somewhat ochreous.

== Subspecies ==
- Cotana rubrescens rubrescens
- Cotana rubrescens kapaura Rothschild, 1917
- Cotana rubrescens oetakwensis Rothschild, 1917
