= Striginiana strigina =

Scientific classification
- Kingdom: Animalia
- Phylum: Arthropoda
- Class: Insecta
- Order: Lepidoptera
- Family: Eupterotidae
- Genus: Striginiana
- Species: S. strigina

Binomial name
- Striginiana strigina (Westwood, 1849)

Synonyms
- Lasiocampa strigina Westwood, 1849

Species of moth

Striginiana strigina is a moth in the family Eupterotidae. It was described by Westwood in 1849. It is found in Cameroon, the Republic of Congo, Gabon, Sierra Leone, Tanzania and Uganda.

Adults are rich chestnut-fulvous, with the basal half of the forewings pinkish buff. The pink tinge is strongest at the base and extends across the hind part of the thorax. Between the base and the distance of one-third of the length of the wing, are two straight, transverse, chestnut-fulvous strigae, which shade gradually into the pale ground colour. There is another abbreviated striga of the same kind at one-third. There is a broad, more oblique chestnut-fulvous bar across the middle of the wing and beyond this, and parallel with it, is another narrow, darker chestnut-fulvous, oblique striga, leaving a broad apical margin of chestnut-fulvous, slightly clouded with an obscure paler wave. The hindwings are blackish-brown at the base, with three transverse white fasciae. The apical half is chestnut-fulvous, with a slight indication of a paler fascia.
