= Cotana neurina =

Scientific classification
- Kingdom: Animalia
- Phylum: Arthropoda
- Class: Insecta
- Order: Lepidoptera
- Family: Eupterotidae
- Genus: Cotana
- Species: C. neurina

Binomial name
- Cotana neurina Turner, 1922

Species of moth

Cotana neurina is a moth in the family Eupterotidae. It was described by Turner in 1922. It is found in Australia, where it has been recorded from Queensland.
