= Gonojana =

Scientific classification
- Kingdom: Animalia
- Phylum: Arthropoda
- Clade: Pancrustacea
- Class: Insecta
- Order: Lepidoptera
- Family: Eupterotidae
- Subfamily: Janinae
- Genus: Gonojana; Aurivillius, 1893

Genus of moths

Gonojana is a genus of moths in the family Eupterotidae erected by Per Olof Christopher Aurivillius in 1893.

== Species ==
Includes the type which may be monotypic:

- Gonojana dimidiata (Aurivillius, 1893)

Others have been treated in genus, but instead an alternative recent scheme instead treats instead under Vianga Fletcher, 1982 (Replacement name for preoccupied Viana Walker, 1869).

- Gonojana crowleyi (Aurivillius, 1904)
- Gonojana magnifica (Rothschild, 1917)
- Gonojana tristis (Druce, 1896)
- Gonojana velutina (Walker)
