= Lasiomorpha =

Scientific classification
- Kingdom: Animalia
- Phylum: Arthropoda
- Class: Insecta
- Order: Lepidoptera
- Family: Eupterotidae
- Subfamily: Eupterotinae
- Genus: Lasiomorpha; Joicey & Talbot in Joicey, Noakes & Talbot, 1916
- Species: L. noakesi

Binomial name
- Lasiomorpha noakesi Joicey & Talbot, 1916

Synonyms
- Lasiomorpha meeki Rothschild, 1917

Species of moth

Lasiomorpha is a monotypic moth genus in the family Eupterotidae first described by James John Joicey and George Talbot in 1916. Its single species, Lasiomorpha noakesi, was described by the same authors in the same year. It is found on New Guinea.

The length of the forewings is about 38 mm. The ground colour of the wings is deep purplish brown, heavily scaled and covered with short hairs at the base. The forewings have a large hyaline (glass-like) patch without scales below, but is sprinkled with scales of the ground colour above. The patch is traversed by a dark line parallel to its outer edge which separates a narrow border more thickly scaled than the larger proximal part. There is a small tuft of yellow hair on the middle discocellular. The hindwings are without markings.
