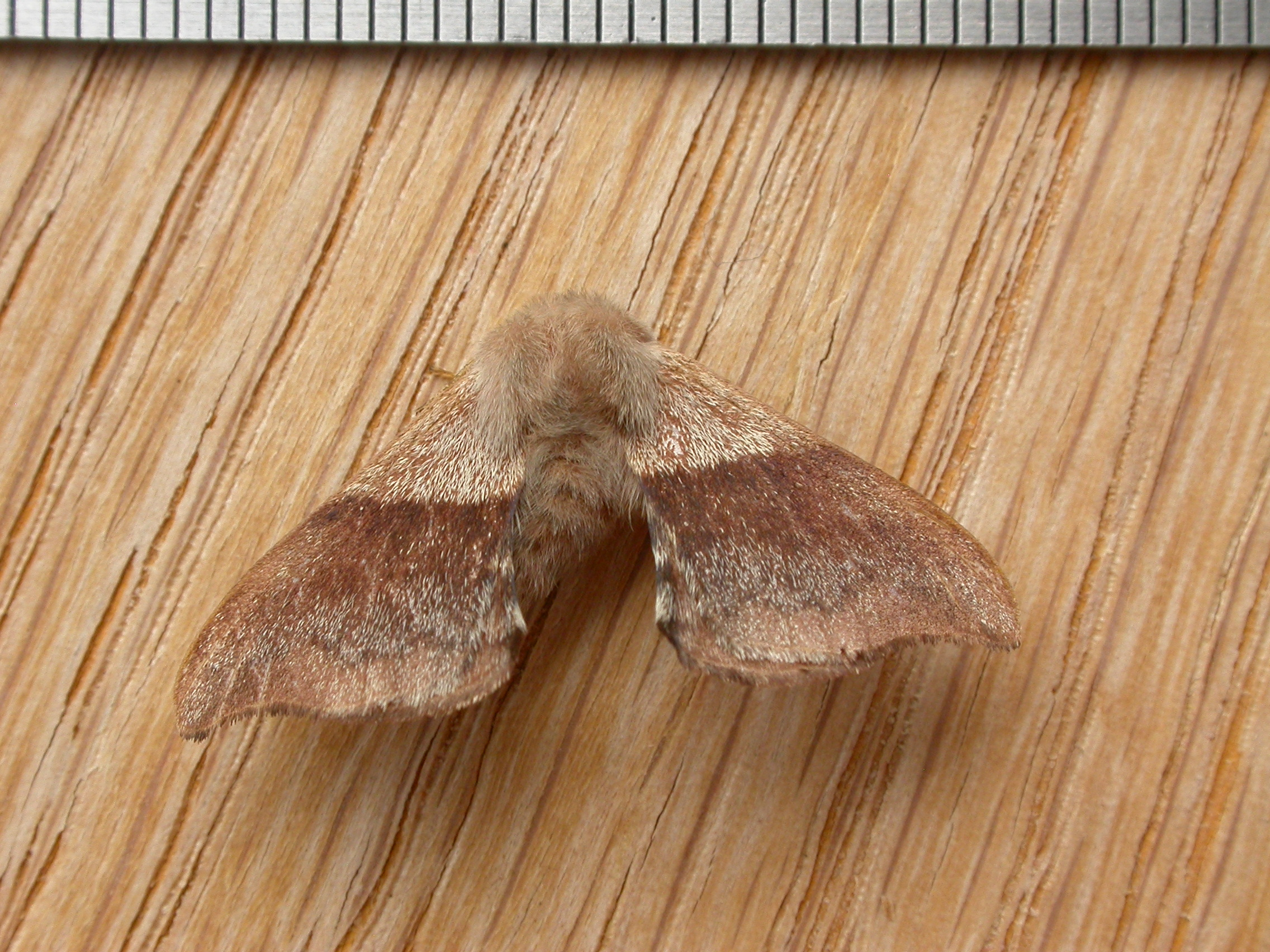
- Panacela lewinae

Scientific classification
- Kingdom: Animalia
- Phylum: Arthropoda
- Clade: Pancrustacea
- Class: Insecta
- Order: Lepidoptera
- Family: Eupterotidae
- Genus: Panacela
- Species: Panacela

Binomial name
- Panacela Walker, 1865

Synonyms
- Semuta Walker, 1865; Mallodeta Turner, 1922 (preocc. Butler, 1871); Lewinibombyx Strand, 1929

= Panacela =

Genus of moths

Panacela is a genus of moths in the family Eupterotidae.

== Species ==
- Panacela lewinae Lewin, 1807
- Panacela nyctopa (Turner, 1922)
- Panacela syntropha Turner, 1922

== Status unknown ==
- Panacela signicosta Strand

== Former species ==
- Panacela pilosa Walker, 1865
