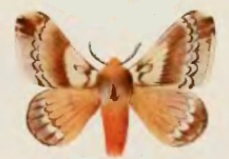
- Male
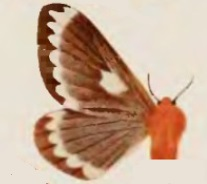
- Female

Scientific classification
- Kingdom: Animalia
- Phylum: Arthropoda
- Class: Insecta
- Order: Lepidoptera
- Family: Eupterotidae
- Genus: Cotana
- Species: C. meeki

Binomial name
- Cotana meeki Rothschild, 1917

= Cotana meeki =

Species of moth

Cotana meeki is a moth in the family Eupterotidae. It was described by Walter Rothschild in 1917. It is found in New Guinea.

The wingspan is about 48 mm for males and 69 mm for females. The basal one-third of the forewings of the males is cream white, with an irregular somewhat hourglass-shaped rufous-chocolate patch running into the middle from the costa with a white dot in the centre. From this patch, a somewhat indistinct irregular dark line runs to the inner margin. The median one-third is chocolate, bordered exteriorly by a lunulate whitish band and with the nervures white. There is also a postmedian broad crenulate lavender-grey band edged narrowly outwardly with chocolate. The outer one-fourth below vein five is creamy white, above vein five chocolate with a large greyish-white apical patch. The basal two-thirds of the hindwings is orange, while the outer one-third is chocolate. There are some indistinct darker shadow lines in the basal portion and a lunulate cream band in the outer one-third. The marginal line is cream. The base of the forewings of the females is reddish orange, while the costo-subcostal area is orange chestnut brown for the basal two-thirds. The rest of the wing is rufous maroon chocolate. There is a large white patch in the basal one-third of the wing below the median and a broad white postdiscal transverse band running out into long intranervular projections distad, with the upper four of these being more pointed. The hindwing ground colour is similar, but the postdiscal band is more distinctly lunulate.
