= Cotana unistrigata =

Scientific classification
- Kingdom: Animalia
- Phylum: Arthropoda
- Class: Insecta
- Order: Lepidoptera
- Family: Eupterotidae
- Genus: Cotana
- Species: C. unistrigata

Binomial name
- Cotana unistrigata (Bethune-Baker, 1904)

Synonyms
- Nervicompressa unistrigata Bethune-Baker, 1904

Species of moth

Cotana unistrigata is a moth in the family Eupterotidae. It was described by George Thomas Bethune-Baker in 1904. It is found in New Guinea.

The wingspan is 39–43 mm. The forewings are ochre-brown with a broad dark grey-brown nearly straight stripe across the wing, beyond the centre, from the costa to the inner margin. The hindwings are ochre-yellow with an oblique dark stripe right across the wing rather in front of the centre.
