= Apha subdives =

Scientific classification
- Kingdom: Animalia
- Phylum: Arthropoda
- Class: Insecta
- Order: Lepidoptera
- Family: Eupterotidae
- Genus: Apha
- Species: A. subdives

Binomial name
- Apha subdives Walker, 1855

Synonyms
- Apha tychoona Butler, 1871

Species of moth

Apha subdives is a moth in the family Eupterotidae. It was described by Francis Walker in 1855. It is found in Bangladesh, India, Bhutan, Myanmar, Thailand, Vietnam and China.

== Subspecies ==
- Apha subdives subdives
- Apha subdives honei Mell, 1937
- Apha subdives tychoona Butler, 1871
- Apha subdives yunnanensis Mell, 1937
