= Poloma (moth) =

Scientific classification
- Kingdom: Animalia
- Phylum: Arthropoda
- Class: Insecta
- Order: Lepidoptera
- Family: Eupterotidae
- Subfamily: Eupterotinae
- Genus: Poloma; Walker, 1855

Synonyms
- Sarvena Walker, 1865

Genus of moths

Poloma is a genus of moths in the family Eupterotidae.

== Species ==
- Poloma angulata Walker, 1855
- Poloma castanea Aurivillius, 1901
- Poloma nigromaculata Aurivillius, 1893

== Former species ==
- Poloma incompta Walker, 1865
