= Panacela syntropha =

Scientific classification
- Kingdom: Animalia
- Phylum: Arthropoda
- Class: Insecta
- Order: Lepidoptera
- Family: Eupterotidae
- Genus: Panacela
- Species: P. syntropha

Binomial name
- Panacela syntropha Turner, 1922

Species of moth

Panacela syntropha is a moth in the family Eupterotidae. It was described by Alfred Jefferis Turner in 1922. It is found in Australia, where it has been recorded from Queensland.

The wingspan is 26–28 mm for males and about 40 mm for females. The forewings are reddish grey (in males) to fuscous grey (in females) with an outwardly curved fuscous line from before the mid-costa to before the mid-dorsum. The postmedian and subterminal lines consist of minute fuscous dots on the veins. The hindwings are reddish grey.
