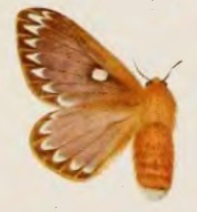

Scientific classification
- Kingdom: Animalia
- Phylum: Arthropoda
- Class: Insecta
- Order: Lepidoptera
- Family: Eupterotidae
- Genus: Cotana
- Species: C. serranotata

Binomial name
- Cotana serranotata (T.P. Lucas, 1894)

Synonyms
- Darala serranotata Lucas, 1894; Darala consuta Lucas, 1900; Hypercydas calliloma Turner, 1903

= Cotana serranotata =

Species of moth

Cotana serranotata is a moth of the family Eupterotidae. It is found in Australia, where it has been recorded from Queensland.

The larvae feed on the foliage of Melaleuca species.
