= Malagasanja =

Scientific classification
- Kingdom: Animalia
- Phylum: Arthropoda
- Class: Insecta
- Order: Lepidoptera
- Family: Eupterotidae
- Subfamily: Janinae
- Genus: Malagasanja; Bouyer, 2011
- Species: M. palliatella

Binomial name
- Malagasanja palliatella (Viette, 1954)

Synonyms
- Jana palliatella Viette, 1954

Genus of moths

Malagasanja is a monotypic moth genus in the family Eupterotidae erected by Thierry Bouyer in 2011. Its single species, Malagasanja palliatella, was described by Pierre Viette in 1954. It is found in Madagascar.
