= Neopreptos =

Scientific classification
- Kingdom: Animalia
- Phylum: Arthropoda
- Class: Insecta
- Order: Lepidoptera
- Family: Eupterotidae
- Subfamily: Eupterotinae
- Genus: Neopreptos; Draudt, 1930

Genus of moths

Neopreptos is a genus of moths in the family Eupterotidae.

== Species ==
- Neopreptos clazomenia Druce, 1886
- Neopreptos marathusa Druce, 1886
