= Preptos =

Scientific classification
- Kingdom: Animalia
- Phylum: Arthropoda
- Class: Insecta
- Order: Lepidoptera
- Family: Eupterotidae
- Subfamily: Eupterotinae
- Genus: Preptos; Schaus, 1892
- Species: P. oropus

Binomial name
- Preptos oropus Schaus, 1892

Synonyms
- Tagora corax Druce, 1893; Preptos hidalgoensis Beutelspacher-Baigts, 1983

Genus of moths

Preptos is a monotypic moth genus in the family Eupterotidae. Its single species, Preptos oropus, is found in Mexico and Guatemala. Both the genus and species were first described by William Schaus in 1892.

The wingspan is about 95 mm. Adults are fawn coloured, the outer margins of the forewings and hindwings are broadly brown and separated from the ground colour by a straight dark line extending from the apices to the inner margins near the angles on both wings. There is a median and on the forewings, as well as an outer transverse dark wavy shade and a blackish spot on the subcostal vein near the base.
