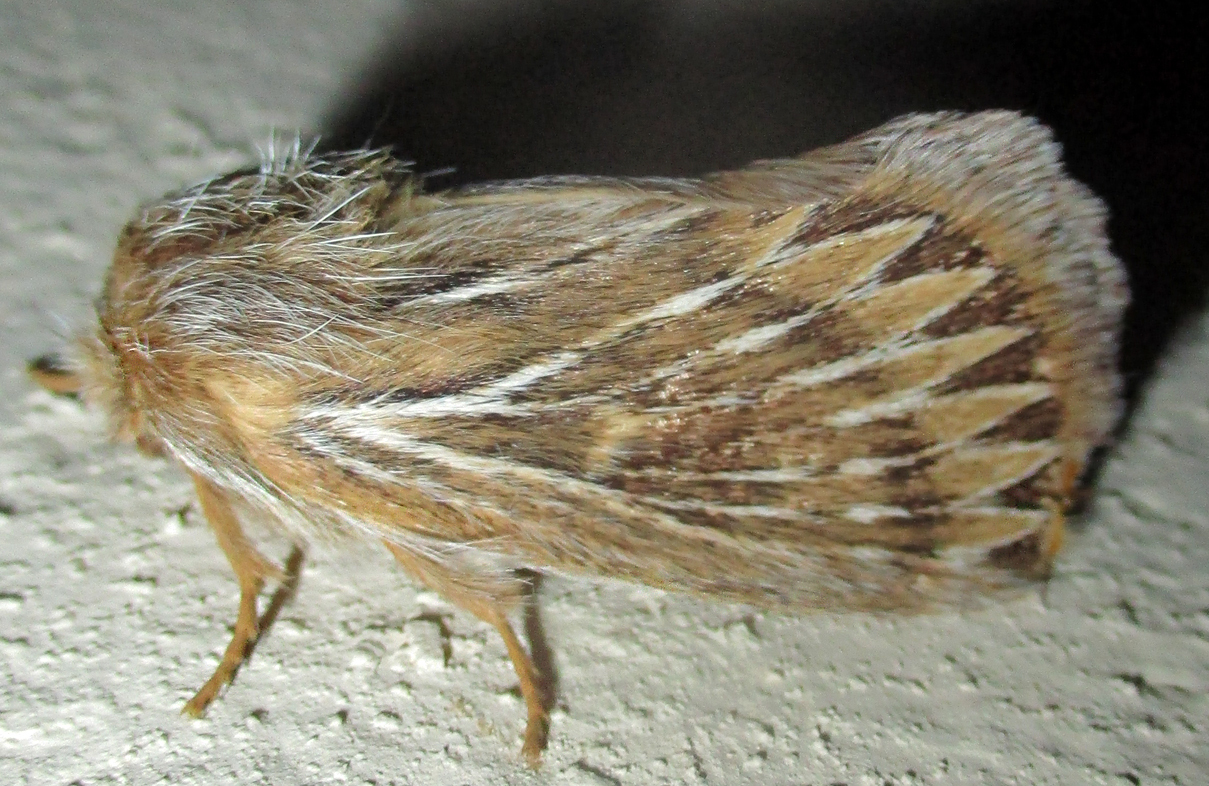
- Marmaroplegma paragarda in Botswana

Scientific classification
- Kingdom: Animalia
- Phylum: Arthropoda
- Class: Insecta
- Order: Lepidoptera
- Family: Eupterotidae
- Subfamily: Eupterotinae
- Genus: Marmaroplegma; Wallengren, 1860

= Marmaroplegma =

Genus of moths

Marmaroplegma is a genus of moths in the family Eupterotidae.

== Species ==
- Marmaroplegma conspersa Aurivillius, 1921
- Marmaroplegma paragarda Wallengren
- Marmaroplegma unicolor Janse, 1915
