= Parajana =

Scientific classification
- Kingdom: Animalia
- Phylum: Arthropoda
- Class: Insecta
- Order: Lepidoptera
- Family: Eupterotidae
- Subfamily: Eupterotinae
- Genus: Parajana; Aurivillius, 1906

Genus of moths

Parajana is a genus of moths in the family Eupterotidae.

== Species ==
- Parajana gabunica Aurivillius, 1892
- Parajana lamani Aurivillius, 1906
