= Urojana =

Scientific classification
- Kingdom: Animalia
- Phylum: Arthropoda
- Class: Insecta
- Order: Lepidoptera
- Family: Eupterotidae
- Subfamily: Janinae
- Genus: Urojana; Gaede, 1915
- Species: U. eborea

Binomial name
- Urojana eborea Gaede, 1915

Genus of moths

Urojana is a monotypic moth genus in the family Eupterotidae first described by Max Gaede in 1915. The only known species of this genus is Urojana eborea, which is known from the Ivory Coast.

This species has a wingspan of 55 millimetres (2.2 in).
