= Parajana gabunica =

Scientific classification
- Kingdom: Animalia
- Phylum: Arthropoda
- Class: Insecta
- Order: Lepidoptera
- Family: Eupterotidae
- Genus: Parajana
- Species: P. gabunica

Binomial name
- Parajana gabunica (Aurivillius, 1892)

Synonyms
- Jana gabunica Aurivillius, 1892; Jana marmorata Holland, 1893

Species of moth

Parajana gabunica is a moth in the family Eupterotidae described by Per Olof Christopher Aurivillius in 1892. It is found in Cameroon, the Democratic Republic of the Congo (Orientale), Gabon and Kenya.
