= Pseudoganisa =

Scientific classification
- Kingdom: Animalia
- Phylum: Arthropoda
- Class: Insecta
- Order: Lepidoptera
- Family: Eupterotidae
- Subfamily: Eupterotinae
- Genus: Pseudoganisa; Schultze, 1910

Genus of moths

Pseudoganisa is a genus of moths in the family Eupterotidae.

== Species ==
- Pseudoganisa currani Schultze, 1910
- Pseudoganisa gonioptera (West, 1932)
