= Pseudoganisa currani =

Scientific classification
- Kingdom: Animalia
- Phylum: Arthropoda
- Class: Insecta
- Order: Lepidoptera
- Family: Eupterotidae
- Genus: Pseudoganisa
- Species: P. currani

Binomial name
- Pseudoganisa currani Schultze, 1910

Species of moth

Pseudoganisa currani is a moth in the family Eupterotidae. It was described by Schultze in 1910. It is found on Mindanao in the Philippines.

The length of the forewings is 28 mm. The wings are tawny, the forewings with a dark brown spot at the end of the cell and a straight oblique postmedial line and two brownish submarginal patches veins two and four. The basal half of the hindwings is hairy, with the postmedial line slightly curved outward.

== Etymology ==
The species is named for Mr. H. M. Curran.
