= Melanergon =

Scientific classification
- Kingdom: Animalia
- Phylum: Arthropoda
- Class: Insecta
- Order: Lepidoptera
- Family: Eupterotidae
- Subfamily: Eupterotinae
- Genus: Melanergon; Bethune-Baker, 1904
- Species: M. vidua

Binomial name
- Melanergon vidua (Walker, 1865)

Synonyms
- Cotana vidua Walker, 1865; Melanergon proserpina Bethune-Baker, 1904; Melanergon vidua louisiadensis Rothschild, 1917; Melanergon vidua fergussonis Rothschild, 1917

Genus of moths

Melanergon is a monotypic moth genus in the family Eupterotidae described by George Thomas Bethune-Baker in 1904. Its only species, Melanergon vidua, was described by Francis Walker in 1865. It is found in New Guinea.

The wingspan 70 mm. The forewings and hindwings are black and covered with black hairs. There is a broad diaphanous postmedial band through both wings.
