= Striginiana =

Scientific classification
- Kingdom: Animalia
- Phylum: Arthropoda
- Class: Insecta
- Order: Lepidoptera
- Family: Eupterotidae
- Subfamily: Janinae
- Genus: Striginiana; Bouyer, 2011

Type species
- Jana strigina Westwood, 1849

Genus of moths

Striginiana is a genus of moths in the family Eupterotidae from Africa.

== Species ==
- Striginiana agrippa (Weymer, 1909)
- Striginiana camerunica (Aurivillius, 1893)
- Striginiana nobilis (Holland, 1893)
- Striginiana pseudostrigina (Rothschild, 1917)
- Striginiana strigina (Westwood, 1849)
