= Tissanga =

Scientific classification
- Kingdom: Animalia
- Phylum: Arthropoda
- Class: Insecta
- Order: Lepidoptera
- Family: Eupterotidae
- Genus: Tissanga; Aurivillius, 1903

Genus of moths

Tissanga is a genus of moths in the family Eupterotidae.

== Species ==
- Tissanga kiboriana Basquin & Darge, 2011
- Tissanga murphyi Bouyer, 2012
- Tissanga pretoriae (Distant, 1892)
- Tissanga zambiana Darge & Minetti, 2012
