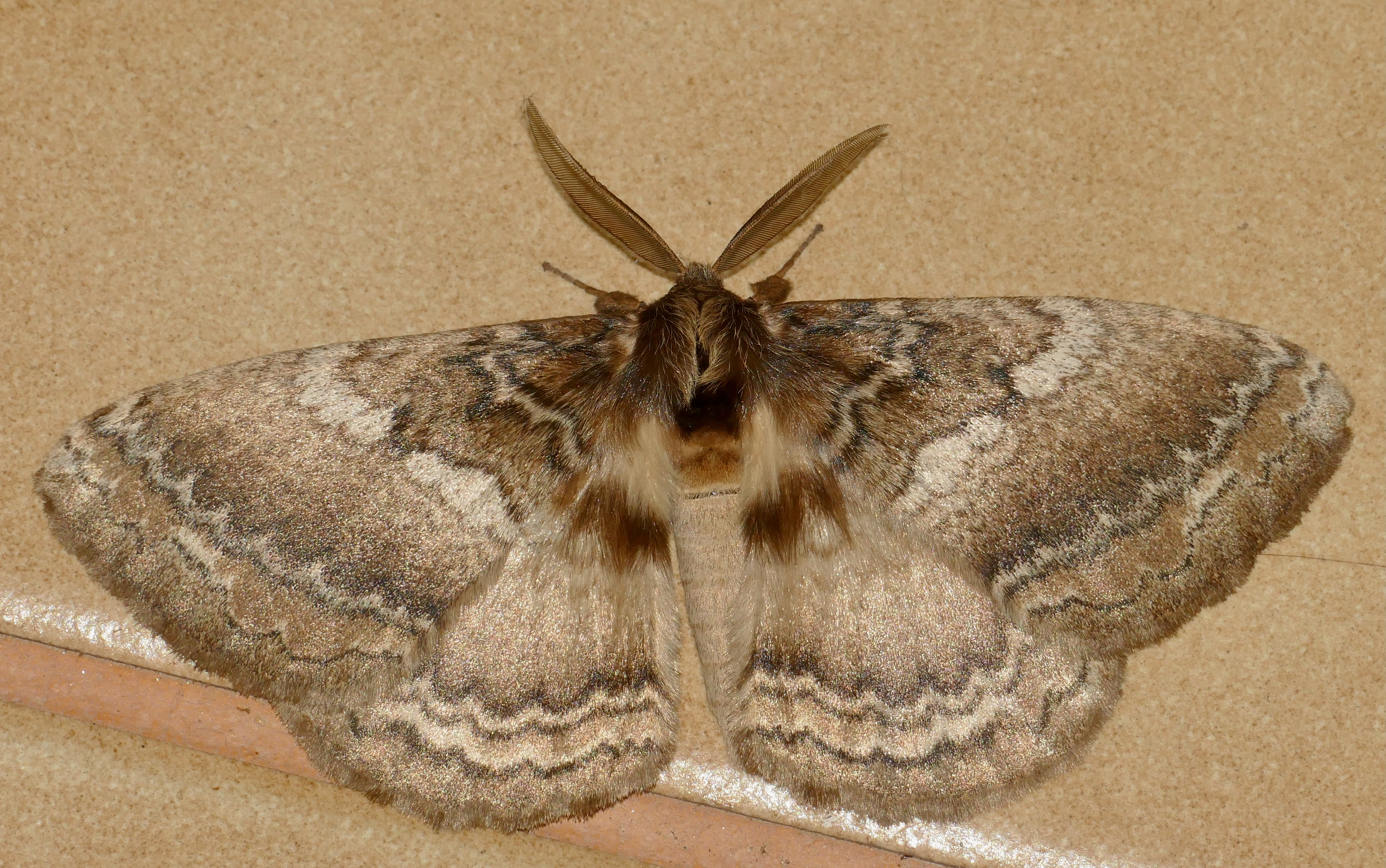

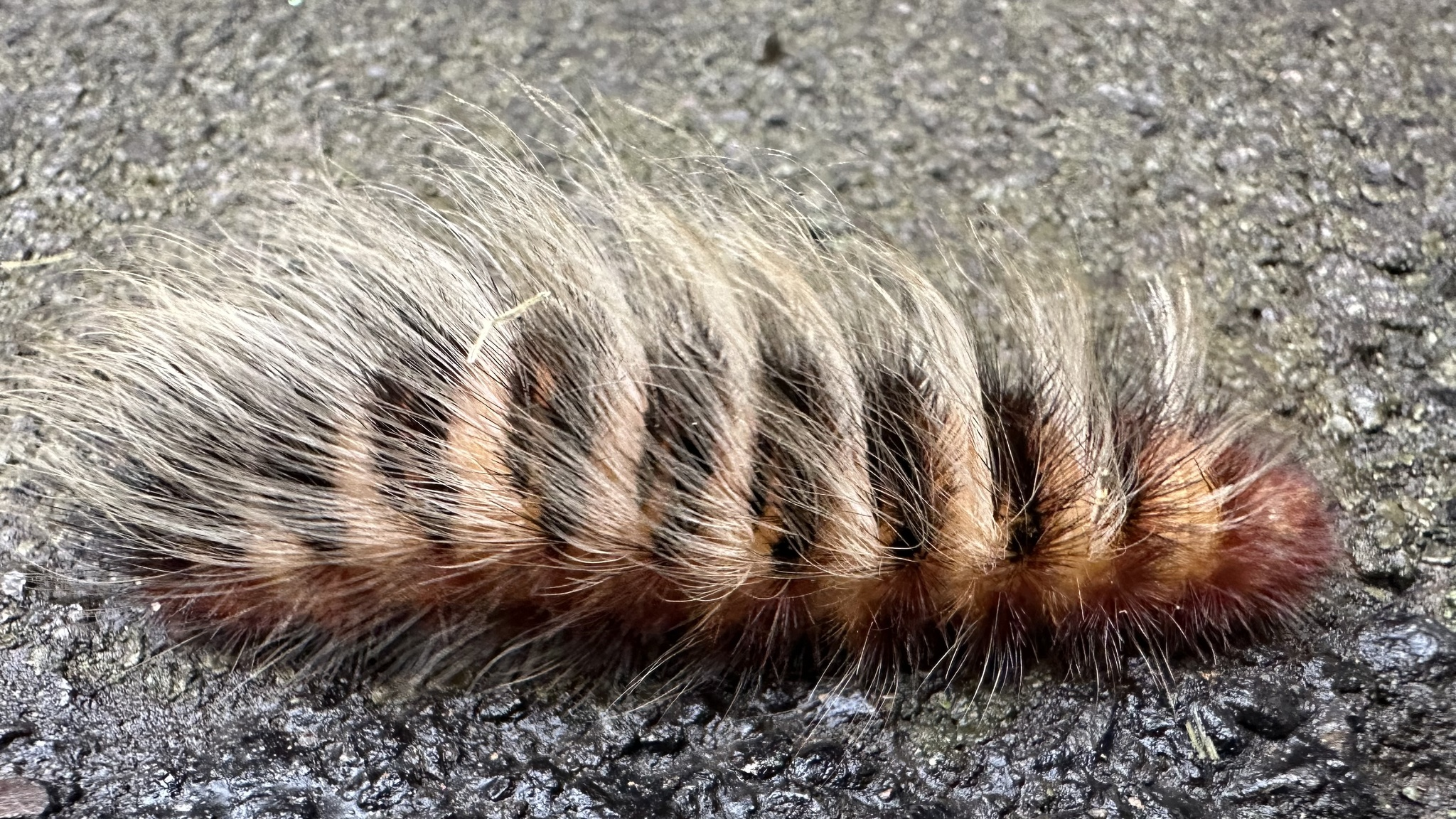
- Adult (top), larva (bottom)

Scientific classification
- Kingdom: Animalia
- Phylum: Arthropoda
- Class: Insecta
- Order: Lepidoptera
- Family: Eupterotidae
- Genus: Striphnopteryx; Wallengren, 1858
- Species: S. edulis

Binomial name
- Striphnopteryx edulis (Boisduval, 1847)

Synonyms
- Bombyx edulis Boisduval, 1847

= Striphnopteryx =

Edible monkey

Genus of moths

Striphnopteryx is a monotypic moth genus in the family Eupterotidae described by Hans Daniel Johan Wallengren in 1858. Its only species, Striphnopteryx edulis, was described by Jean Baptiste Boisduval in 1847. It is found in South Africa, where it has been recorded from KwaZulu-Natal and Mpumalanga. Its common name is the edible monkey.
