= Panacela nyctopa =

Scientific classification
- Kingdom: Animalia
- Phylum: Arthropoda
- Clade: Pancrustacea
- Class: Insecta
- Order: Lepidoptera
- Family: Eupterotidae
- Genus: Panacela
- Species: P. nyctopa

Binomial name
- Panacela nyctopa (Turner, 1922)

Synonyms
- Mallodeta nyctopa Turner, 1922

Species of moth

Panacela nyctopa is a moth in the family Eupterotidae. It was described by Alfred Jefferis Turner in 1922. It is found in Australia, where it has been recorded from Queensland.

The wingspan is about 34 mm for males and 40–44 mm for females. The forewings are fuscous brown, with a dark fuscous line from the mid-costa to the mid-dorsum. There a second parallel line from three-fourths of the costa to three-fourths of the dorsum. There is also a slender, faintly marked subterminal line. The hindwings have the same colour and lines as the forewings.
