= Trichophiala =

Scientific classification
- Kingdom: Animalia
- Phylum: Arthropoda
- Class: Insecta
- Order: Lepidoptera
- Family: Eupterotidae
- Subfamily: Eupterotinae
- Genus: Trichophiala; Aurivillius, 1879
- Species: T. devylderi

Binomial name
- Trichophiala devylderi Aurivillius, 1879

Genus of moths

Trichophiala is a monotypic moth genus in the family Eupterotidae. It was described by Per Olof Christopher Aurivillius in 1879. Its only species, Trichophiala devylderi, was described by the same author in the same year. It is found in Namibia.
