= Calapterote =

Scientific classification
- Kingdom: Animalia
- Phylum: Arthropoda
- Class: Insecta
- Order: Lepidoptera
- Family: Eupterotidae
- Genus: Calapterote; Holland, 1900
- Species: C. butleri

Binomial name
- Calapterote butleri Holland, 1900

Synonyms
- Elachyophtalma butleri Holland, 1900

Genus of moths

Calapterote is a monotypic moth genus in the family Eupterotidae. Its only species, Calapterote butleri, is found on Buru in Indonesia. Both the genus and species were described by William Jacob Holland in 1900.

The wingspan is 42 mm (1.7 in). Adults are uniform pale ochreous, shading into very pale brown on the forewings.
