= Paraphyllalia =

Scientific classification
- Kingdom: Animalia
- Phylum: Arthropoda
- Clade: Pancrustacea
- Class: Insecta
- Order: Lepidoptera
- Family: Eupterotidae
- Subfamily: Eupterotinae
- Genus: Paraphyllalia; Gaede, 1927
- Species: P. degenera

Binomial name
- Paraphyllalia degenera (Walker, 1855)

Synonyms
- Dreata degenera Walker, 1855

Genus of moths

Paraphyllalia is a monotypic moth genus in the family Eupterotidae described by Max Gaede in 1927. Its single species, Paraphyllalia degenera, was described Its Francis Walker in 1855 and is found in South Africa.
