= Rarisquamosa =

Scientific classification
- Kingdom: Animalia
- Phylum: Arthropoda
- Class: Insecta
- Order: Lepidoptera
- Family: Eupterotidae
- Genus: Rarisquamosa; Bethune-Baker, 1910
- Species: R. arfaki

Binomial name
- Rarisquamosa arfaki Bethune-Baker, 1910

Genus of moths

Rarisquamosa is a monotypic moth genus in the family Eupterotidae. Its single species, Rarisquamosa arfaki, is found in New Guinea. Both the genus and species were described by George Thomas Bethune-Baker in 1910.

The wingspan is about 49 mm. The forewings and hindwings are rufous, the median area of the forewings broadly covered with fine grey hair-like scales and a broadish rufous line across the end of the cell, and an irregular terminal area of similar grey scales. The postmedial area between these grey areas is clear and rufous. The hindwings are uniform.
