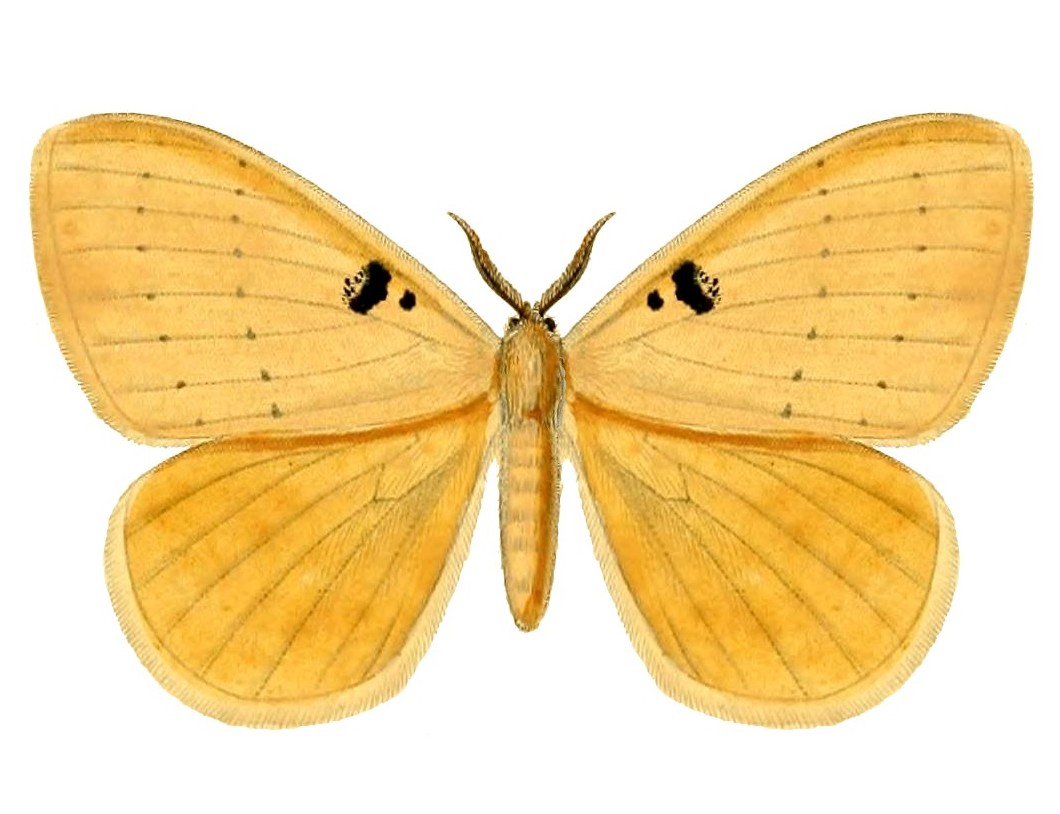

Scientific classification
- Kingdom: Animalia
- Phylum: Arthropoda
- Class: Insecta
- Order: Lepidoptera
- Family: Eupterotidae
- Subfamily: Janinae
- Genus: Catajana; Strand, 1910
- Species: C. bimaculata

Binomial name
- Catajana bimaculata (Dewitz, 1879)

Synonyms
- Dreata bimaculata Dewitz, 1879; Hemijana bimaculata

= Catajana =

Genus of moths

Catajana is a monotypic moth genus in the family Eupterotidae described by Embrik Strand in 1910. Its only species, Catajana bimaculata, described by Hermann Dewitz in 1879, is found in Angola, the Democratic Republic of the Congo, and other parts of Central and Southern Africa.

== Etymology ==
The genus name Catajana was introduced by Embrik Strand in 1910. The species name bimaculata refers to the two distinctive spots on the forewings of the moth.

== Description ==
Catajana bimaculata is medium-sized with a robust build typical of Eupterotidae moths. Forewings are pale with two dark spots; hindwings are lighter and more uniform in color.
