= Teratojana =

Scientific classification
- Kingdom: Animalia
- Phylum: Arthropoda
- Clade: Pancrustacea
- Class: Insecta
- Order: Lepidoptera
- Family: Eupterotidae
- Subfamily: Eupterotinae
- Genus: Teratojana; Hering, 1937
- Species: T. flavina

Binomial name
- Teratojana flavina Hering, 1937

Genus of moths

Teratojana is a monotypic moth genus in the family Eupterotidae. Its single species, Teratojana flavina, was found in the former Katanga Province of the Democratic Republic of the Congo. Both the genus and species were first described by Erich Martin Hering in 1937.
