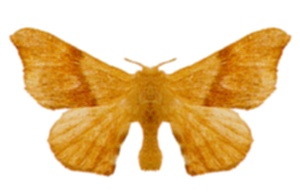

Scientific classification
- Kingdom: Animalia
- Phylum: Arthropoda
- Class: Insecta
- Order: Lepidoptera
- Family: Eupterotidae
- Genus: Panacela
- Species: P. lewinae

Binomial name
- Panacela lewinae (Lewin, 1805)

Synonyms
- Bombyx lewinae Lewin, 1805; Pamea transiens Walker, 1855; Oreta sobria Walker, 1855; Eriogaster simplex Walker, 1855; Thaumatopoea lewinii Herrich-Schäffer, [1858]; Naprepa pilosa Walker, 1865; Naprepa hirta Walker, 1865; Panacela rufescens Walker, 1865; Semuta pristina Walker, 1865; Panacela lewinii Herrich-Schäffer, [1856] (missp.); Panacela prisca Turner, 1922 (missp.)

= Panacela lewinae =

Species of moth

Panacela lewinae, or Lewin's bag shelter moth, is a moth of the family Eupterotidae. The species was first described by John Lewin in 1805. It is found in Australia from southern Queensland to southern New South Wales.

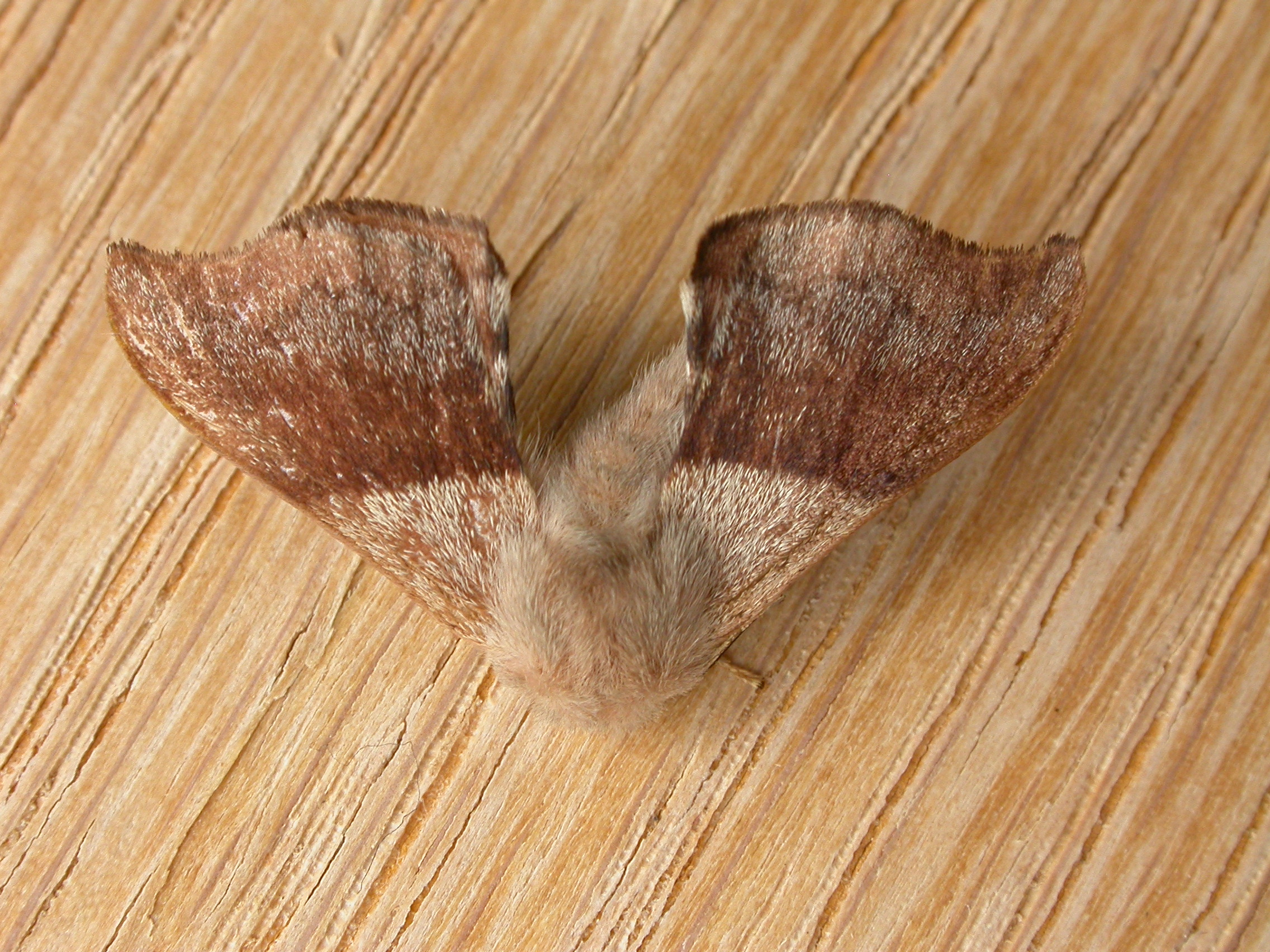

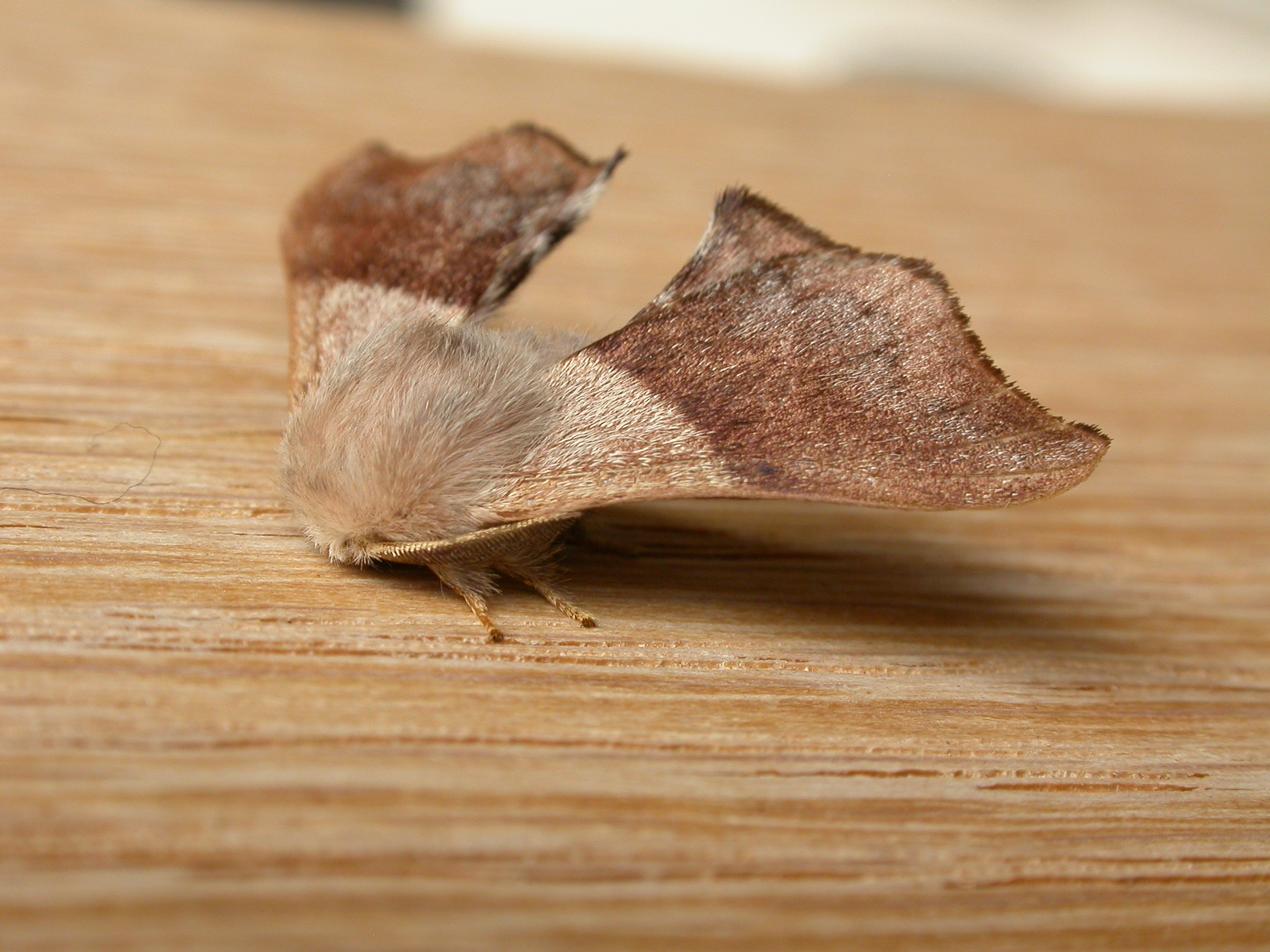

The wingspan is about 30 mm.

The caterpillars live communally in a shelter on their food plant, made of leaves joined by silk. They spend the day in this shelter and come out to feed at night. They feed on Eucalyptus, Lophostemon, Angophora and Syncarpia (including Syncarpia glomulifera) species, as well as Chamaecytisus prolifer, Pinus radiata and Exocarpus cupressiformis.

The hairs of the caterpillars can cause skin irritation (urticaria).
