= Neodrymonia rufa =

Scientific classification
- Kingdom: Animalia
- Phylum: Arthropoda
- Clade: Pancrustacea
- Class: Insecta
- Order: Lepidoptera
- Superfamily: Noctuoidea
- Family: Notodontidae
- Genus: Neodrymonia
- Species: N. rufa

Binomial name
- Neodrymonia rufa (Yang, 1995)

Synonyms
- Pugniphalera rufa Yang, 1995

Species of moth

Neodrymonia rufa is a moth in the family Notodontidae. It was described by Yang in 1995. It is found in northern Vietnam and the Chinese provinces of Yunnan, Jiangxi, Hunan and Fujian.
