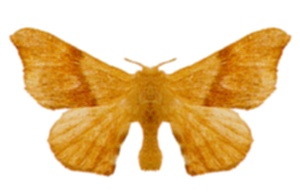
- Panacela lewinae

Scientific classification
- Kingdom: Animalia
- Phylum: Arthropoda
- Clade: Pancrustacea
- Class: Insecta
- Order: Lepidoptera
- Superfamily: Bombycoidea
- Family: Eupterotidae; Swinhoe, 1892

Genera
- See text.

Synonyms
- Striphnopterygidae Wallengren, 1858; Phialidae Wallengren, 1865; Janidae Aurivillius, 1892; Hibrildidae Berger, 1958; Cotaninae Forbes, 1955; Tissangini Forbes, 1955

= Eupterotidae =

Family of moths

Eupterotidae is a family of insects in the order Lepidoptera with more than 300 described species.

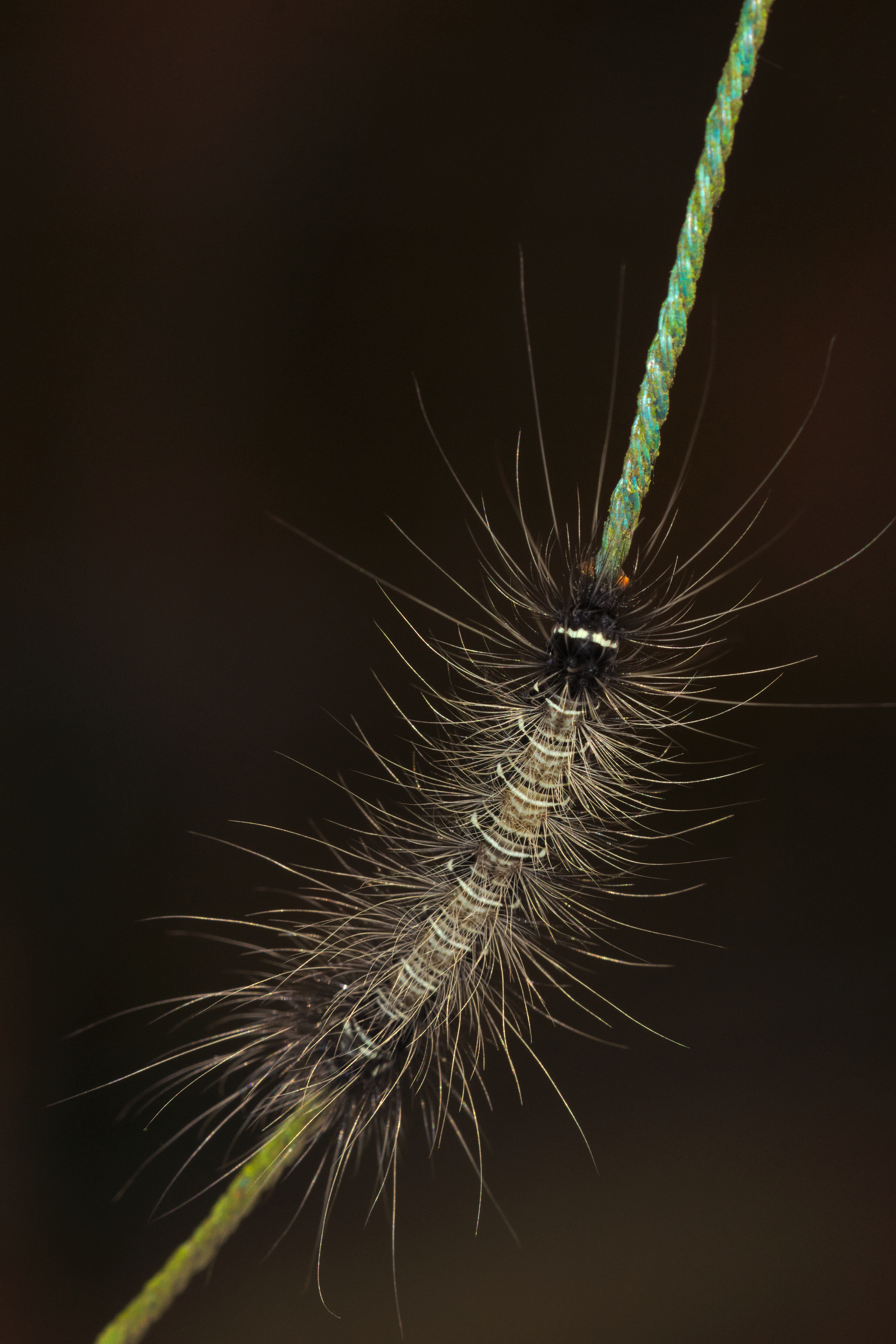
Eupterotidae larva in Kerala

== Diversity ==
The family consists of four subfamilies and the unplaced Ganissa group. The subfamily Eupterotinae consists of about 11 genera, the Ganissa group about 10 genera, the subfamily Janinae about 16 genera, the subfamily Panacelinae consists of one genus and 3 species and the subfamily Striphnopteryginae of 15 genera.

== Genera ==
- Subfamily Eupterotinae
  - Tribe Cotanini Forbes, 1955
    - Cotana
    - Melanergon
  - Tribe Eupterotini
    - Apha
    - Apona
    - Dreata
    - Eupterote
    - Ganisa
    - Lasiomorpha
    - Marmaroplegma
    - Melanothrix
    - Neopreptos
    - Nisaga
    - Palirisa
    - Pandala
    - Parajana
    - Phyllalia
    - Poloma
    - Preptos
    - Preptothauma
    - Pseudoganisa
    - Pseudojana
    - Tagora
- Subfamily Hibrildinae Berger, 1958
  - Hibrildes
- Subfamily Janinae Aurivillius, 1892
  - Acrojana
  - Camerunia
  - Catajana
  - Drepanojana
  - Ebbepterote Naumann, Giusti & Nässig, 2024
  - Epijana
  - Gonojana
  - Gracilanja
  - Hemijana
  - Hoplojana
  - Jana
  - Malagasanja
  - Pterocerota
  - Rhodopteriana
  - Stenoglene
  - Striginiana
  - Tantaliana (in some schemes divergent)
  - Tissanga
  - Urojana
  - Vianga (=Viana)
- Subfamily Panacelinae Forbes, 1955
  - Panacela
- Subfamily Striphnopteryginae Wallengren, 1858
  - Bantuana
  - Cyrtojana
  - Euchera
  - Janomima
  - ichenopteryx
  - Papuapterote
  - Paraphyllalia
  - Phiala
  - Schistissa
  - Striphnopteryx
  - Teratojana
  - Trichophiala
- Unassigned
  - Calapterote
  - Paramarane
  - Rarisquamosa

== Former genera ==
- Euchera
- Gastridiota
- Hypercydas
- Leptojana
- Messata
- Murlida
- Nervicompressa
- Pachyjana
- Paracydas
- Pugniphalera (=Neodrymonia Matsumura, 1920)
- Sangatissa
- Sarmalia
- Sarvena
- Spalyria
- Sesquiluna
- Sphingognatha
- Thermojana Yang, 1995 (=Gangaridopsis Grunberg, 1912)
