= List of moths of Australia (Hepialidae) =

Partial list of Australian moths

This is a list of the Australian moth species of the family Hepialidae. It also acts as an index to the species articles and forms part of the full List of moths of Australia.

- Abantiades albofasciatus (Swinhoe, 1892)
- Abantiades aphenges (Turner, 1904)
- Abantiades aurilegulus Tindale, 1932
- Abantiades barcas (Pfitzner, 1914)
- Abantiades fulvomarginatus Tindale, 1932
- Abantiades hyalinatus (Herrich-Schäffer, 1853)
- Abantiades hydrographus (R. Felder, 1874)
- Abantiades labyrinthicus (Donovan, 1805)
- Abantiades latipennis Tindale, 1932
- Abantiades leucochiton (Pfitzner, 1914)
- Abantiades magnificus (T.P. Lucas, 1898)
- Abantiades marcidus Tindale, 1932
- Abantiades ocellatus Tindale, 1932
- Abantiades sericatus Tindale, 1932
- Aenetus astathes (Turner, 1915)
- Aenetus blackburnii (Lower, 1892)
- Aenetus dulcis (Swinhoe, 1892)
- Aenetus eximia (Scott, 1869)
- Aenetus lewinii (Walker, 1856)
- Aenetus ligniveren (Lewin, 1805)
- Aenetus mirabilis Rothschild, 1894
- Aenetus montanus Tindale, 1953
- Aenetus ombraloma (Lower, 1902)
- Aenetus ramsayi (Scott, 1869)
- Aenetus scotti (Scott, 1869)
- Aenetus scripta (Scott, 1869)
- Aenetus splendens (Scott, 1864)
- Aenetus tegulatus (Pagenstecher, 1888)
- Aenetus tephroptilus (Turner, 1915)
- Bordaia furva Tindale, 1932
- Bordaia karnka Tindale, 1941
- Bordaia moesta Tindale, 1932
- Bordaia paradoxa Tindale, 1932
- Bordaia pica Tindale, 1932
- Elhamma australasiae (Walker, 1856)
- Fraus basicornis Nielsen & Kristensen, 1989
- Fraus basidispina Nielsen & Kristensen, 1989
- Fraus bilineata Walker, 1865
- Fraus biloba Nielsen & Kristensen, 1989
- Fraus crocea (T.P. Lucas, 1891)
- Fraus distispina Nielsen & Kristensen, 1989
- Fraus furcata Nielsen & Kristensen, 1989
- Fraus fusca (T.P. Lucas, 1891)
- Fraus griseomaculata Nielsen & Kristensen, 1989
- Fraus latristria Nielsen & Kristensen, 1989
- Fraus linogyna Nielsen & Kristensen, 1989
- Fraus marginispina Nielsen & Kristensen, 1989
- Fraus mediaspina Nielsen & Kristensen, 1989
- Fraus megacornis Nielsen & Kristensen, 1989
- Fraus minima Nielsen & Kristensen, 1989
- Fraus nanus (Herrich-Schäffer, 1853)
- Fraus orientalis Nielsen & Kristensen, 1989
- Fraus pelagia (Turner, 1927)
- Fraus pilosa Nielsen & Kristensen, 1989
- Fraus polyspila (Meyrick, 1890)
- Fraus pteromela (Lower, 1892)
- Fraus quadrangula Nielsen & Kristensen, 1989
- Fraus serrata Nielsen & Kristensen, 1989
- Fraus simulans Walker, 1856
- Fraus tedi Nielsen & Kristensen, 1989
- Jeana delicatula Tindale, 1935
- Jeana robiginosa Turner, 1939
- Oncopera alboguttata Tindale, 1933
- Oncopera alpina Tindale, 1933
- Oncopera brachyphylla Turner, 1925
- Oncopera brunneata Tindale, 1933
- Oncopera epargyra Turner, 1925
- Oncopera fasciculatus (Walker, 1869)
- Oncopera intricata Walker, 1856
- Oncopera intricoides Tindale, 1933
- Oncopera mitocera Turner, 1911
- Oncopera parva Tindale, 1933
- Oncopera rufobrunnea Tindale, 1933
- Oncopera tindalei Common, 1966
- Oxycanus aedesima (Turner, 1929)
- Oxycanus antipoda (Herrich-Schäffer, 1853)
- Oxycanus armatus Tindale, 1955
- Oxycanus aurifex Tindale, 1935
- Oxycanus australis Walker, 1856
- Oxycanus ballux Tindale, 1935
- Oxycanus barnardi Tindale, 1935
- Oxycanus beltista (Turner, 1926)
- Oxycanus buluwandji Tindale, 1964
- Oxycanus byrsa (Pfitzner, 1933)
- Oxycanus carus Tindale, 1935
- Oxycanus determinata (Walker, 1856)
- Oxycanus dirempta (Walker, 1865)
- Oxycanus gelidus Tindale, 1935
- Oxycanus glauerti Tindale, 1955
- Oxycanus goldfinchi Tindale, 1935
- Oxycanus goodingi Tindale, 1935
- Oxycanus hamatus Tindale, 1935
- Oxycanus herdus Tindale, 1935
- Oxycanus hildae Tindale, 1964
- Oxycanus incanus Tindale, 1935
- Oxycanus janeus Tindale, 1935
- Oxycanus kochi Tindale, 1955
- Oxycanus loesus Tindale, 1935
- Oxycanus lyelli Tindale, 1935
- Oxycanus maculosus (R. Felder, 1874)
- Oxycanus naias Tindale, 1935
- Oxycanus niphadias (Meyrick, 1890)
- Oxycanus nuptialis Tindale, 1935
- Oxycanus occidentalis Tindale, 1935
- Oxycanus oreades E.D. Edwards & K. Green, 2011
- Oxycanus oressigenes E.D. Edwards & K. Green, 2011
- Oxycanus perditus Tindale, 1935
- Oxycanus poeticus Tindale, 1935
- Oxycanus promiscuus Tindale, 1935
- Oxycanus rosaceus Tindale, 1935
- Oxycanus rufescens Walker, 1856
- Oxycanus silvanus Tindale, 1935
- Oxycanus sirpus Tindale, 1935
- Oxycanus spadix Tindale, 1935
- Oxycanus sphragidias (Meyrick, 1890)
- Oxycanus stellans Tindale, 1935
- Oxycanus subvaria (Walker, 1856)
- Oxycanus waterhousei Tindale, 1935
- Trictena argyrosticha Turner, 1929
- Trictena atripalpis (Walker, 1856)
- Trictena barnardi Tindale, 1941
- Zelotypia stacyi Scott, 1869
