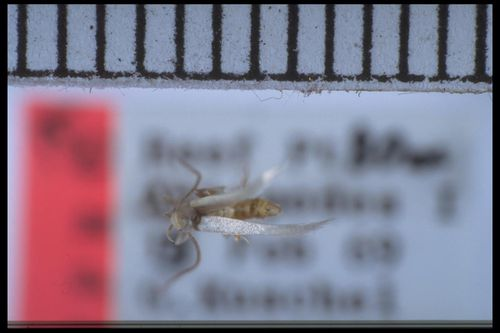
- Holotype

Scientific classification
- Kingdom: Animalia
- Phylum: Arthropoda
- Class: Insecta
- Order: Lepidoptera
- Family: Elachistidae
- Genus: Elachista
- Species: E. antipodensis

Binomial name
- Elachista antipodensis (Dugdale, 1971)

Synonyms
- Irenicodes galatheae subsp. antipodensis Dugdale, 1971; Elachista galatheae subsp. antipodensis (Dugdale, 1971)

= Elachista antipodensis =

Species of moth endemic to New Zealand

Elachista antipodensis is a moth in the family Elachistidae. It was first described by John S. Dugdale in 1971. It is endemic to New Zealand and found on the Antipodes Islands.

== Taxonomy ==
This species was first described by John S. Dugdale in 1971. Dugdale originally believed it to be a subspecies of Irenicodes galatheae and named it Irenicodes galatheae antipodensis. In 1977 Ernst Christian Traugott-Olsen and Ebbe Nielsen confirmed that the genus Irenicodes was synonymised with Elachista. In 1999 Lauri Kaila raised this subspecies to species rank. The justification for this change was given in 2019 and was based on the differences in male genitalia between E. galatheae and E. antipodensis. The male holotype specimen, collected on Antipodes Island, is held in the New Zealand Arthropod Collection.

== Distribution ==
This species is endemic to New Zealand and is found on the Antipodes Islands.
