= Jeana =

Jeana may refer to:

- Jeana (moth), a genus of moth of the family Hepialidae
- Jeana (given name)
