= H. crocea =

H. crocea may refer to:

- Hainesia crocea, a land snail
- Hectomanes crocea, a moth endemic to Australia
- Hesperocharis crocea, an American butterfly
- Homodes crocea, an owlet moth
