= Bipectilus latirami =

Scientific classification
- Kingdom: Animalia
- Phylum: Arthropoda
- Class: Insecta
- Order: Lepidoptera
- Family: Hepialidae
- Genus: Bipectilus
- Species: B. latirami

Binomial name
- Bipectilus latirami Nielsen, 1988

Species of moth

Bipectilus latirami is a species of moth of the family Hepialidae. It is known from Nepal.
