= Squamicornia aequatoriella =

Scientific classification
- Domain: Eukaryota
- Kingdom: Animalia
- Phylum: Arthropoda
- Class: Insecta
- Order: Lepidoptera
- Family: Micropterigidae
- Genus: Squamicornia
- Species: S. aequatoriella

Binomial name
- Squamicornia aequatoriella Kristensen & Nielsen, 1982

Species of moth

Squamicornia aequatoriella is a species of moth belonging to the family Micropterigidae. It was described by Kristensen & Nielsen in 1982. It is known from the Napo province in Ecuador.
