= Bipectilus omaiensis =

Scientific classification
- Kingdom: Animalia
- Phylum: Arthropoda
- Class: Insecta
- Order: Lepidoptera
- Family: Hepialidae
- Genus: Bipectilus
- Species: B. omaiensis

Binomial name
- Bipectilus omaiensis Nielsen, 1988

Species of moth

Bipectilus omaiensis is a species of moth of the family Hepialidae. It is known from Sichuan province, China.
