= Squamicornia =

Scientific classification
- Domain: Eukaryota
- Kingdom: Animalia
- Phylum: Arthropoda
- Class: Insecta
- Order: Lepidoptera
- Family: Micropterigidae
- Genus: Squamicornia; Kristensen & Nielsen, 1982

Species
- See text

Genus of moths in family Micropterigidae

Squamicornia is a genus of small primitive metallic moths in the family Micropterigidae.

== Species ==
- Squamicornia aequatoriella Kristensen & Nielsen, 1982
