= Bipectilus tindalei =

Scientific classification
- Kingdom: Animalia
- Phylum: Arthropoda
- Class: Insecta
- Order: Lepidoptera
- Family: Hepialidae
- Genus: Bipectilus
- Species: B. tindalei

Binomial name
- Bipectilus tindalei Nielsen, 1988

Species of moth

Bipectilus tindalei is a species of moth in the family Hepialidae, known to inhabit Vietnam and Thailand.
