= Bipectilus zhejiangensis =

Scientific classification
- Kingdom: Animalia
- Phylum: Arthropoda
- Class: Insecta
- Order: Lepidoptera
- Family: Hepialidae
- Genus: Bipectilus
- Species: B. zhejiangensis

Binomial name
- Bipectilus zhejiangensis Wang, 2001

Species of moth

Bipectilus zhejiangensis is a species of moth of the family Hepialidae. It is found in Zhejiang, China.
