= Fraus basicornis =

Scientific classification
- Kingdom: Animalia
- Phylum: Arthropoda
- Class: Insecta
- Order: Lepidoptera
- Family: Hepialidae
- Genus: Fraus
- Species: F. basicornis

Binomial name
- Fraus basicornis Nielsen and Kristensen, 1989

Species of moth

Fraus basicornis is a moth of the family Hepialidae. It is endemic to Western Australia.

The wingspan is 24–28 mm for males. Adults are on wing from April to May.
