= Bipectilus yunnanensis =

Scientific classification
- Domain: Eukaryota
- Kingdom: Animalia
- Phylum: Arthropoda
- Class: Insecta
- Order: Lepidoptera
- Family: Hepialidae
- Genus: Bipectilus
- Species: B. yunnanensis

Binomial name
- Bipectilus yunnanensis Chu and Wang, 1985

Species of moth

Bipectilus yunnanensis is a species of moth of the family Hepialidae. It is known from China (Yunnan).
