= Bipectilus unimacula =

Scientific classification
- Domain: Eukaryota
- Kingdom: Animalia
- Phylum: Arthropoda
- Class: Insecta
- Order: Lepidoptera
- Family: Hepialidae
- Genus: Bipectilus
- Species: B. unimacula

Binomial name
- Bipectilus unimacula (Daniel, 1940)

Synonyms
- Gorgopis unimacula Daniel, 1940

Species of moth

Bipectilus unimacula is a species of moth of the family Hepialidae. It is known from China (Jiangsu).
