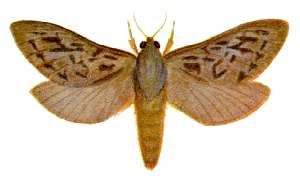
- Oxycanus antipoda

Scientific classification
- Kingdom: Animalia
- Phylum: Arthropoda
- Class: Insecta
- Order: Lepidoptera
- Family: Hepialidae
- Genus: Oxycanus; Walker, 1855

Species
- See text

Synonyms
- Porina Walker, 1856 (preocc.); Gorina Quail, 1899; Goryna Quail, 1899; Paraoxycanus Viette, 1950

= Oxycanus =

Genus of moths

Oxycanus is a genus of moths in the family Hepialidae. There are 71 described species found in Australia and New Guinea.

== Species ==
- Oxycanus aedisima – Australia
- Oxycanus aegrus – New Guinea
- Oxycanus albostrigata – Australia
- Oxycanus altenai – New Guinea
- Oxycanus antipoda – Australia (Tasmania)

- Larva feeds on grasses

- Oxycanus armatus – Australia
- Oxycanus atrox – Australia
- Oxycanus aurifex – Australia
- Oxycanus australis – Australia
- Oxycanus ballux – Australia
- Oxycanus barnardi – Australia
- Oxycanus beltista – Australia
- Oxycanus buluwandji – Australia
- Oxycanus byrsa – Australia
- Oxycanus carus – Australia
- Oxycanus determinata – Australia
- Oxycanus diakonoffi – New Guinea
- Oxycanus dirempta – Australia
- Oxycanus discipennis – New Guinea
- Oxycanus dives – New Guinea
- Oxycanus eos – Australia
- Oxycanus fuliginosa – Australia
- Oxycanus gelidus – Australia
- Oxycanus glauerti – Australia
- Oxycanus goldfinchi – Australia
- Oxycanus goodingi – Australia
- Oxycanus hamatus – Australia
- Oxycanus hebe – New Guinea
- Oxycanus hecabe – New Guinea
- Oxycanus herbuloti – New Guinea
- Oxycanus herdus – Australia
- Oxycanus hildae – Australia
- Oxycanus incanus – Australia
- Oxycanus janeus – Australia
- Oxycanus kochi – Australia
- Oxycanus loesus – Australia
- Oxycanus lyelli – Australia
- Oxycanus maculosus – Australia
- Oxycanus mayri – New Guinea
- Oxycanus meeki – New Guinea
- Oxycanus naias – Australia
- Oxycanus nigra – New Guinea
- Oxycanus nigripuncta – New Guinea
- Oxycanus niphadias – Australia
- Oxycanus novaeguineensis – New Guinea
- Oxycanus nuptialis – Australia
- Oxycanus occidentalis – Australia
- Oxycanus oreades – Australia
- Oxycanus oressigenes – Australia
- Oxycanus perditus – Australia
- Oxycanus perplexus – New Guinea
- Oxycanus poeticus – Australia
- Oxycanus postflavida – New Guinea
- Oxycanus postxois – New Guinea
- Oxycanus promiscuus – Australia
- Oxycanus rileyi – Australia
- Oxycanus rosaceus – Australia
- Oxycanus rufescens – Australia
- Oxycanus salmonacea – Australia
- Oxycanus serratus – New Guinea
- Oxycanus sirpus – Australia
- Oxycanus snelleni – New Guinea
- Oxycanus spadix – Australia
- Oxycanus sphragidias – Australia
- Oxycanus stellans – Australia
- Oxycanus subochracea – New Guinea
- Oxycanus subvaria – Australia
- Oxycanus sylvanus – Australia
- Oxycanus tamsi – New Guinea
- Oxycanus thasus – New Guinea
- Oxycanus toxopeusi – New Guinea
- Oxycanus tyres – New Guinea
- Oxycanus xois – New Guinea
- Oxycanus waterhousei – Australia
