= Oxycanus albostrigata =

Scientific classification
- Kingdom: Animalia
- Phylum: Arthropoda
- Class: Insecta
- Order: Lepidoptera
- Family: Hepialidae
- Genus: Oxycanus
- Species: O. albostrigata

Binomial name
- Oxycanus albostrigata (Rothschild, 1913)

Synonyms
- Phassodes albostrigata Rothschild, 1913

Species of moth

Oxycanus albostrigata is a moth of the family Hepialidae. It is found in New Guinea.
