= Fraus marginispina =

Scientific classification
- Kingdom: Animalia
- Phylum: Arthropoda
- Class: Insecta
- Order: Lepidoptera
- Family: Hepialidae
- Genus: Fraus
- Species: F. marginispina

Binomial name
- Fraus marginispina Nielsen and Kristensen, 1989

Species of moth

Fraus marginispina is a moth of the family Hepialidae. It is endemic to South Australia.
