= Oxycanus nigripuncta =

Scientific classification
- Kingdom: Animalia
- Phylum: Arthropoda
- Class: Insecta
- Order: Lepidoptera
- Family: Hepialidae
- Genus: Oxycanus
- Species: O. nigripuncta

Binomial name
- Oxycanus nigripuncta (Joicey and Talbot, 1917)

Synonyms
- Porina nigripuncta Joicey and Talbot, 1917; Porina nigricosta Joicey and Talbot, 1917

Species of moth

Oxycanus nigripuncta is a moth of the family Hepialidae. It is found in New Guinea.
