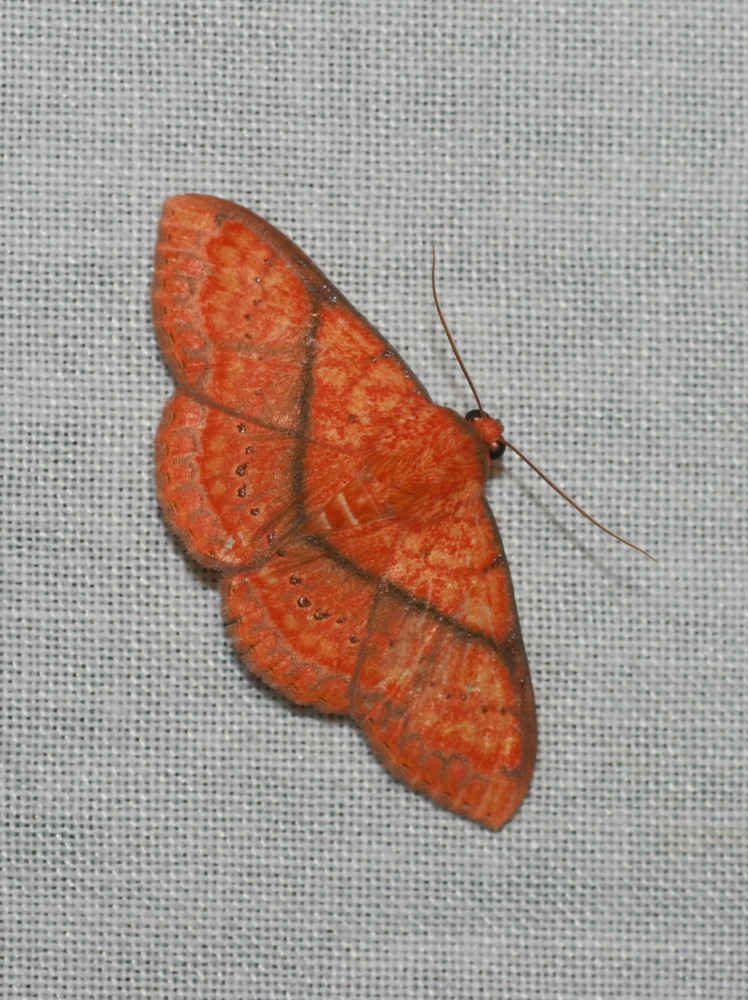

Scientific classification
- Kingdom: Animalia
- Phylum: Arthropoda
- Class: Insecta
- Order: Lepidoptera
- Superfamily: Noctuoidea
- Family: Erebidae
- Genus: Homodes
- Species: H. vivida

Binomial name
- Homodes vivida Guenée, 1852

Synonyms
- Laginia maraxaria Walker, 1860; Homodes regularis Snellen, 1880

= Homodes vivida =

Species of moth

Homodes vivida is a moth of the family Erebidae first described by Achille Guenée in 1852. It is found in India, Sri Lanka, Myanmar, Singapore, Borneo and Sulawesi.

Both wings darker, redder orange in color. Medially and submarginally pinkish bands present. Medial bands strong and straight. Larval food plants are Artocarpus heterophyllus, Terminalia paniculata, Derris and Flindersia species.

== Gallery ==
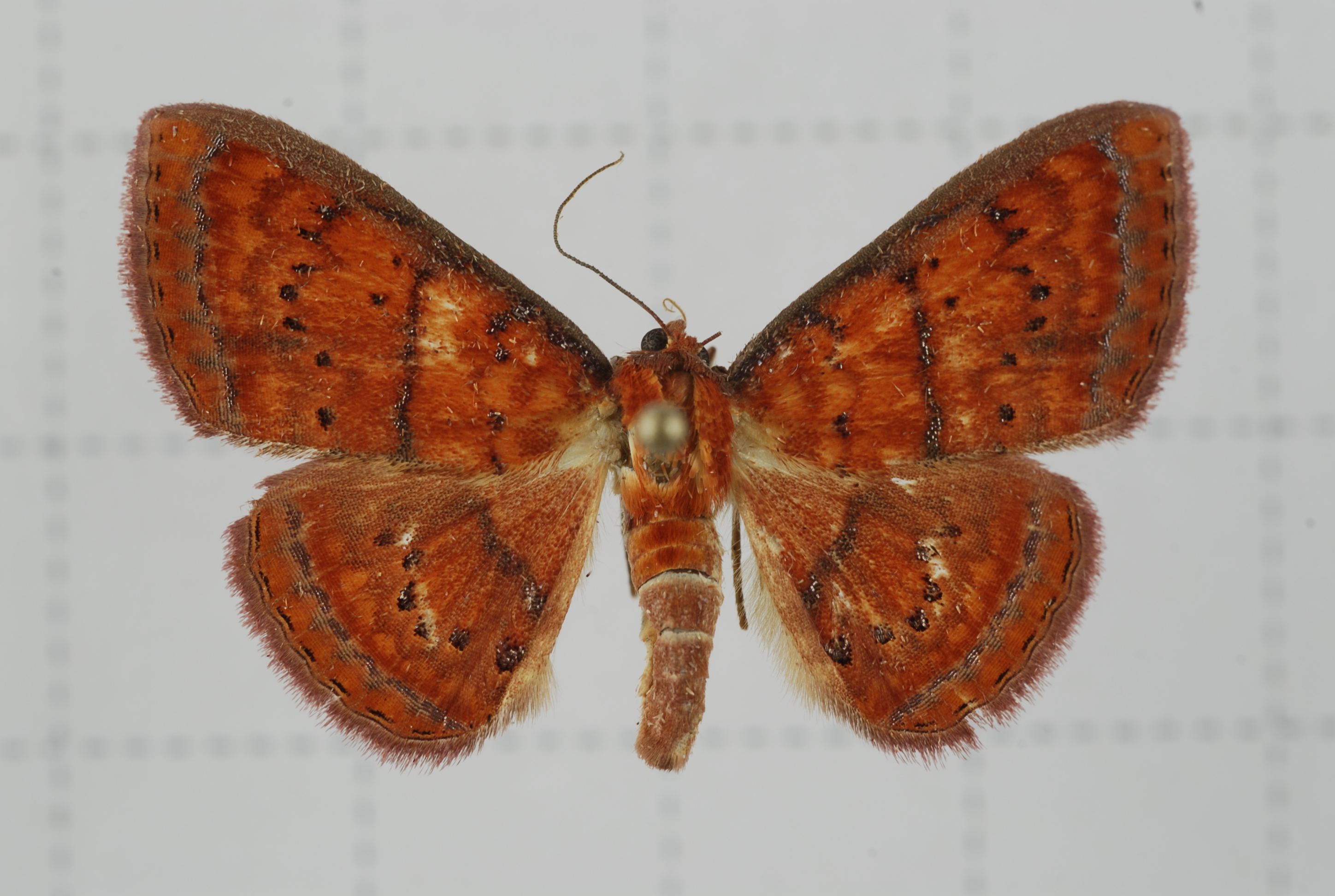

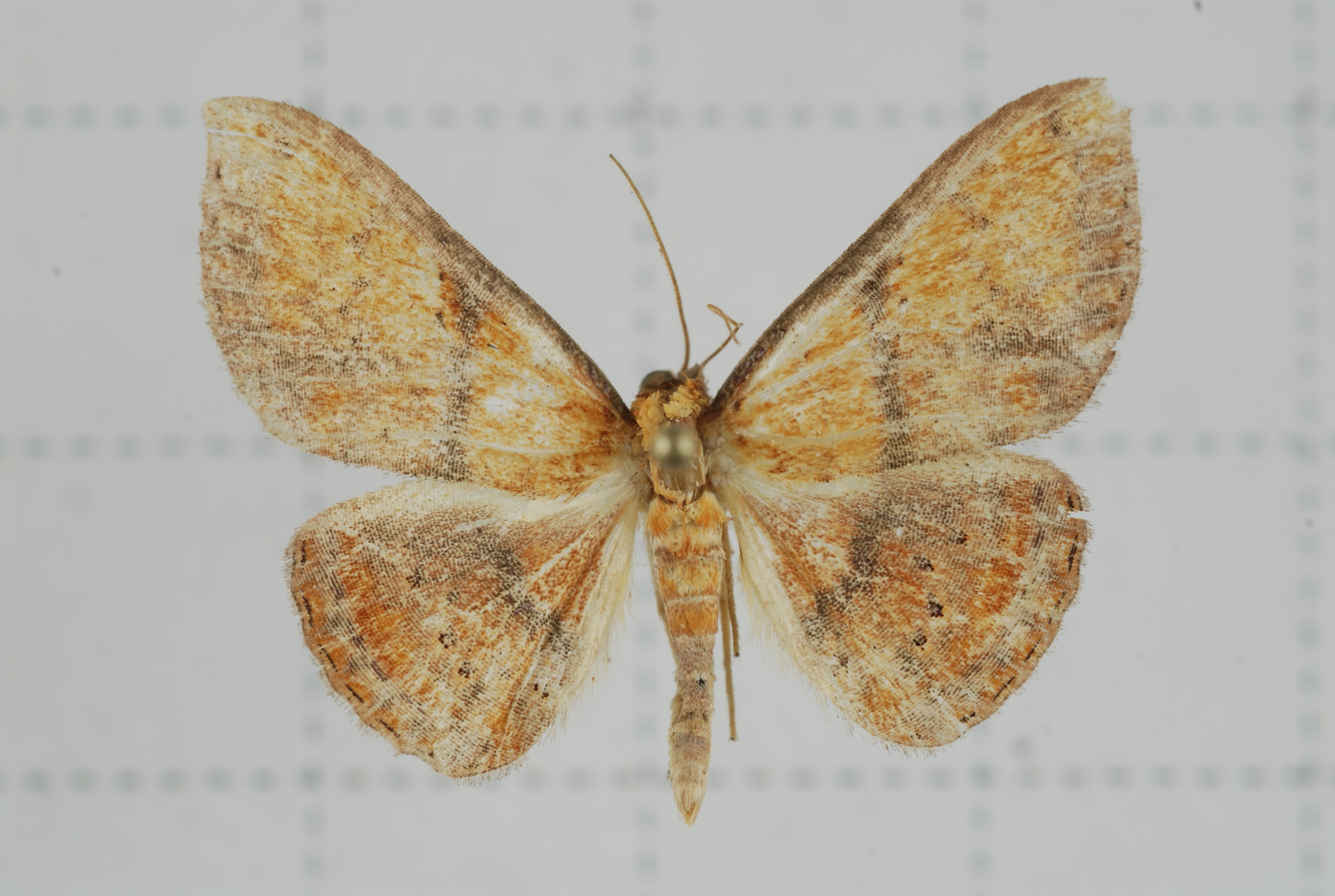

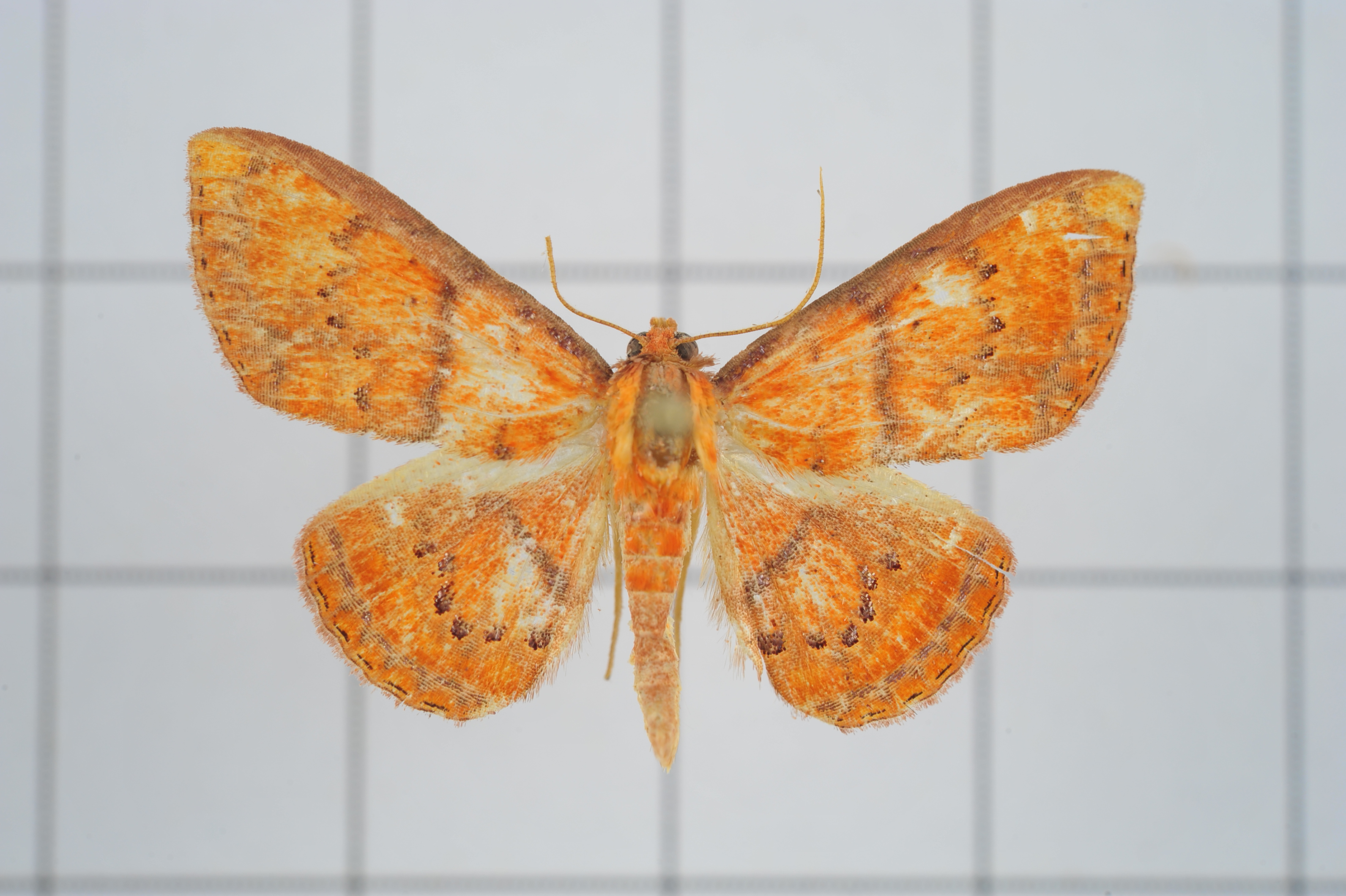

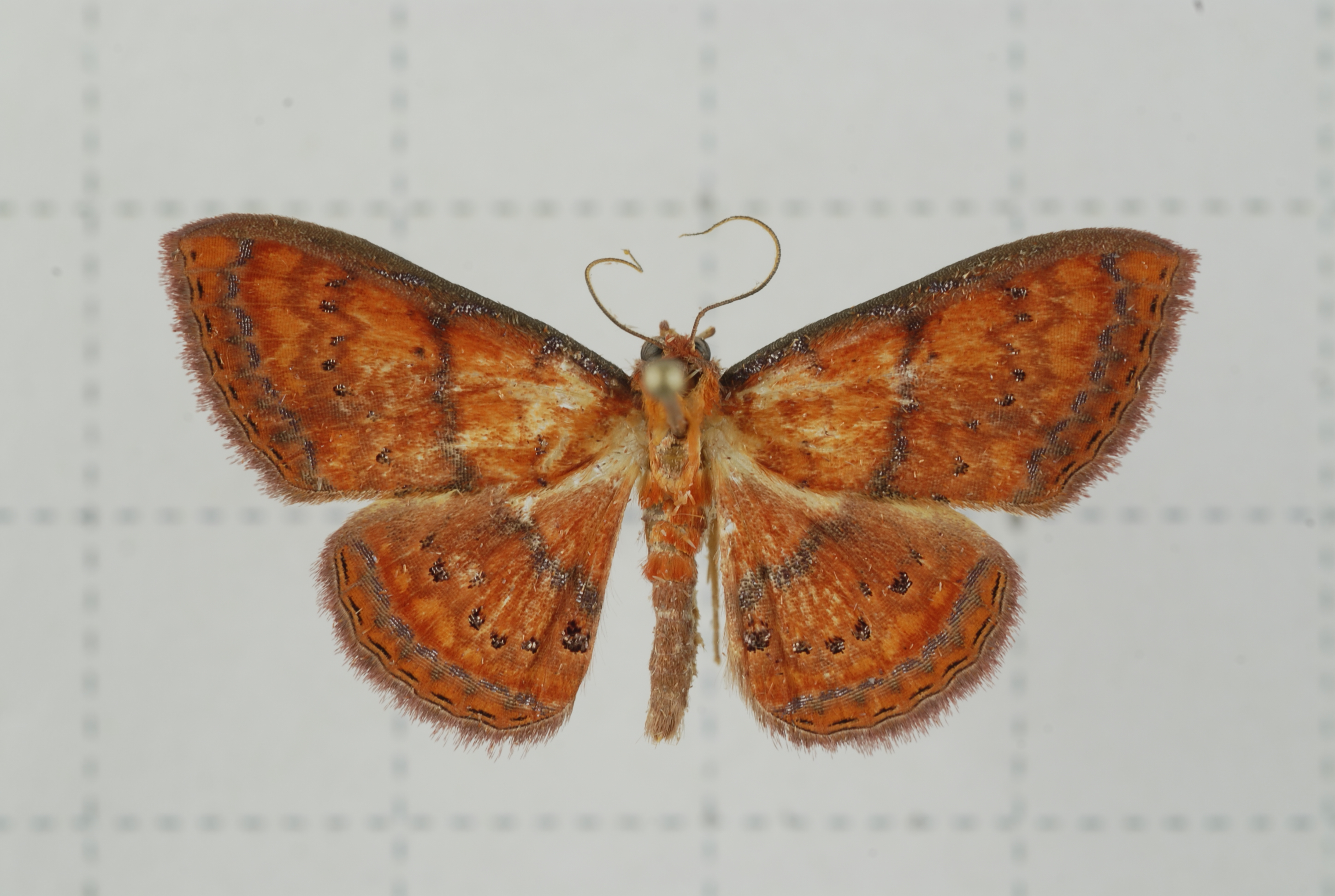
