= Fraus latistria =

Scientific classification
- Kingdom: Animalia
- Phylum: Arthropoda
- Class: Insecta
- Order: Lepidoptera
- Family: Hepialidae
- Genus: Fraus
- Species: F. latistria

Binomial name
- Fraus latistria Nielsen and Kristensen, 1989

Synonyms
- Fraus latristria

Species of moth

Fraus latistria, the broad-striped ghost moth, is a moth of the family Hepialidae. It is endemic to Tasmania.
