= Oxycanus postxois =

Scientific classification
- Kingdom: Animalia
- Phylum: Arthropoda
- Clade: Pancrustacea
- Class: Insecta
- Order: Lepidoptera
- Family: Hepialidae
- Genus: Oxycanus
- Species: O. postxois

Binomial name
- Oxycanus postxois (Viette, 1956)

Synonyms
- Paraoxycanus postxois Viette, 1956

Species of moth

Oxycanus postxois is a moth of the family Hepialidae. It is found in New Guinea.
