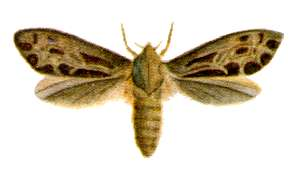
- Oncopera intricata

Scientific classification
- Domain: Eukaryota
- Kingdom: Animalia
- Phylum: Arthropoda
- Class: Insecta
- Order: Lepidoptera
- Family: Hepialidae
- Genus: Oncopera; Walker, 1856

Species
- See text

Synonyms
- Oncoptera Meyrick, 1890; Paroncopera Tindale, 1933; Onchopera Birket-Smith, 1974; Onchoptera Birket-Smith, 1974

= Oncopera =

Genus of moths

Oncopera is a genus of moths of the family Hepialidae. There are 12 described species, all endemic to Australia. The larvae usually feed on grasses, although that of O. intricata has been recorded on strawberry.

== Species ==
- Oncopera alboguttata (Ebor grassgrub) - New South Wales
- Oncopera alpina (alpine grassgrub) - New South Wales

- Food plant: Poa

- Oncopera brachyphylla (roundheaded pasture webworm) - Queensland

- Food plants include Panicum

- Oncopera brunneata
- Oncopera epargyra
- Oncopera fasciculatus (underground grassgrub) - Western Australia, South Australia, Victoria
- Oncopera intricata (corbie) - Tasmania

- Larva recorded on Fragaria as well as grasses

- Oncopera intricoides
- Oncopera mitocera (flatheaded pasture webworm) - Queensland

- Food plants include Digitaria, Panicum and Setaria

- Oncopera parva
- Oncopera rufobrunnea (winter corbie) - New South Wales, Victoria, Tasmania
- Oncopera tindalei (Tindale's grassgrub) - New South Wales (named after Norman Barnett Tindale)
