= Oxycanus subochracea =

Scientific classification
- Kingdom: Animalia
- Phylum: Arthropoda
- Class: Insecta
- Order: Lepidoptera
- Family: Hepialidae
- Genus: Oxycanus
- Species: O. subochracea

Binomial name
- Oxycanus subochracea (Joicey and Talbot, 1917)

Synonyms
- Porina subochracea Joicey and Talbot, 1917; Porina argentipuncta Joicey and Talbot, 1917; Oxycanus subochrea Tindale, 1955

Species of moth

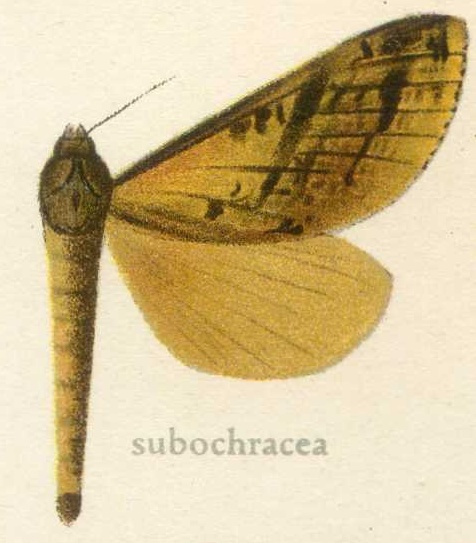

Oxycanus subochracea is a moth of the family Hepialidae. It is found in New Guinea.
