= Bordaia =

Scientific classification
- Domain: Eukaryota
- Kingdom: Animalia
- Phylum: Arthropoda
- Class: Insecta
- Order: Lepidoptera
- Family: Hepialidae
- Genus: Bordaia; Tindale, 1932

Species
- See text.

Synonyms
- Bordaja Chu and Wang, 1985

Genus of moths

Bordaia is a genus of moths of the family Hepialidae. There are five described species, all endemic to Australia.

== Species ==
- Bordaia furva
- Bordaia karnka
- Bordaia moesta
- Bordaia paradoxa
- Bordaia pica
