= Fraus pilosa =

Scientific classification
- Kingdom: Animalia
- Phylum: Arthropoda
- Class: Insecta
- Order: Lepidoptera
- Family: Hepialidae
- Genus: Fraus
- Species: F. pilosa

Binomial name
- Fraus pilosa Nielsen and Kristensen, 1989

Species of moth

Fraus pilosa is a moth belonging to the Hepialidae family. It is endemic to Western Australia.
