= Oxycanus fuliginosa =

Scientific classification
- Kingdom: Animalia
- Phylum: Arthropoda
- Class: Insecta
- Order: Lepidoptera
- Family: Hepialidae
- Genus: Oxycanus
- Species: O. fuliginosa

Binomial name
- Oxycanus fuliginosa (Rothschild, 1915)

Synonyms
- Porina fuliginosa Rothschild, 1915

Species of moth

Oxycanus fuliginosa is a moth of the family Hepialidae. It is found in New Guinea.
