= Oxycanus herbuloti =

Scientific classification
- Kingdom: Animalia
- Phylum: Arthropoda
- Class: Insecta
- Order: Lepidoptera
- Family: Hepialidae
- Genus: Oxycanus
- Species: O. herbuloti

Binomial name
- Oxycanus herbuloti (Viette, 1956)

Synonyms
- Paraoxycanus herbuloti Viette, 1956

Species of moth

Oxycanus herbuloti is a moth of the family Hepialidae. It is found in New Guinea.
