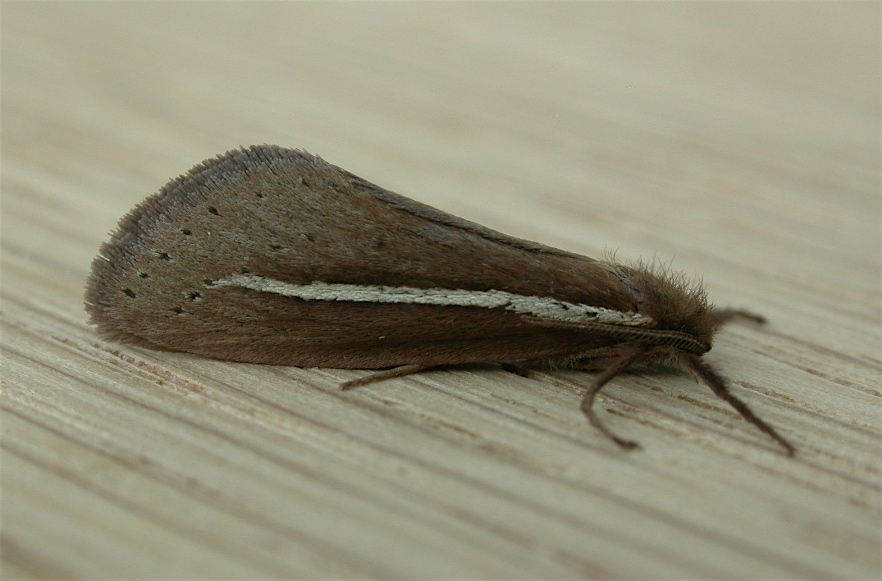
- Fraus pteromela in Australia.

Scientific classification
- Domain: Eukaryota
- Kingdom: Animalia
- Phylum: Arthropoda
- Class: Insecta
- Order: Lepidoptera
- Family: Hepialidae
- Genus: Fraus; Walker, 1856

Species
- See text.

Synonyms
- Hectomanes Meyrick, 1890; Praus Pagenstecher, 1909

= Fraus (moth) =

Genus of moths

Fraus is a genus of moths of the family Hepialidae. There are 25 described species, all endemic to Australia.

== Species ==
- Fraus basicornis
- Fraus basidispina
- Fraus bilineata
- Fraus biloba
- Fraus crocea
- Fraus distispina
- Fraus furcata
- Fraus fusca
- Fraus griseomaculata
- Fraus latistria – broad-striped ghost moth
- Fraus linogyna
- Fraus marginispina
- Fraus mediaspina
- Fraus megacornis
- Fraus minima
- Fraus nanus
- Fraus orientalis
- Fraus pelagia
- Fraus pilosa
- Fraus polyspila
- Fraus pteromela
- Fraus quadrangula
- Fraus serrata
- Fraus simulans – lesser ghost moth
  - Larva feeds on grasses
- Fraus tedi
