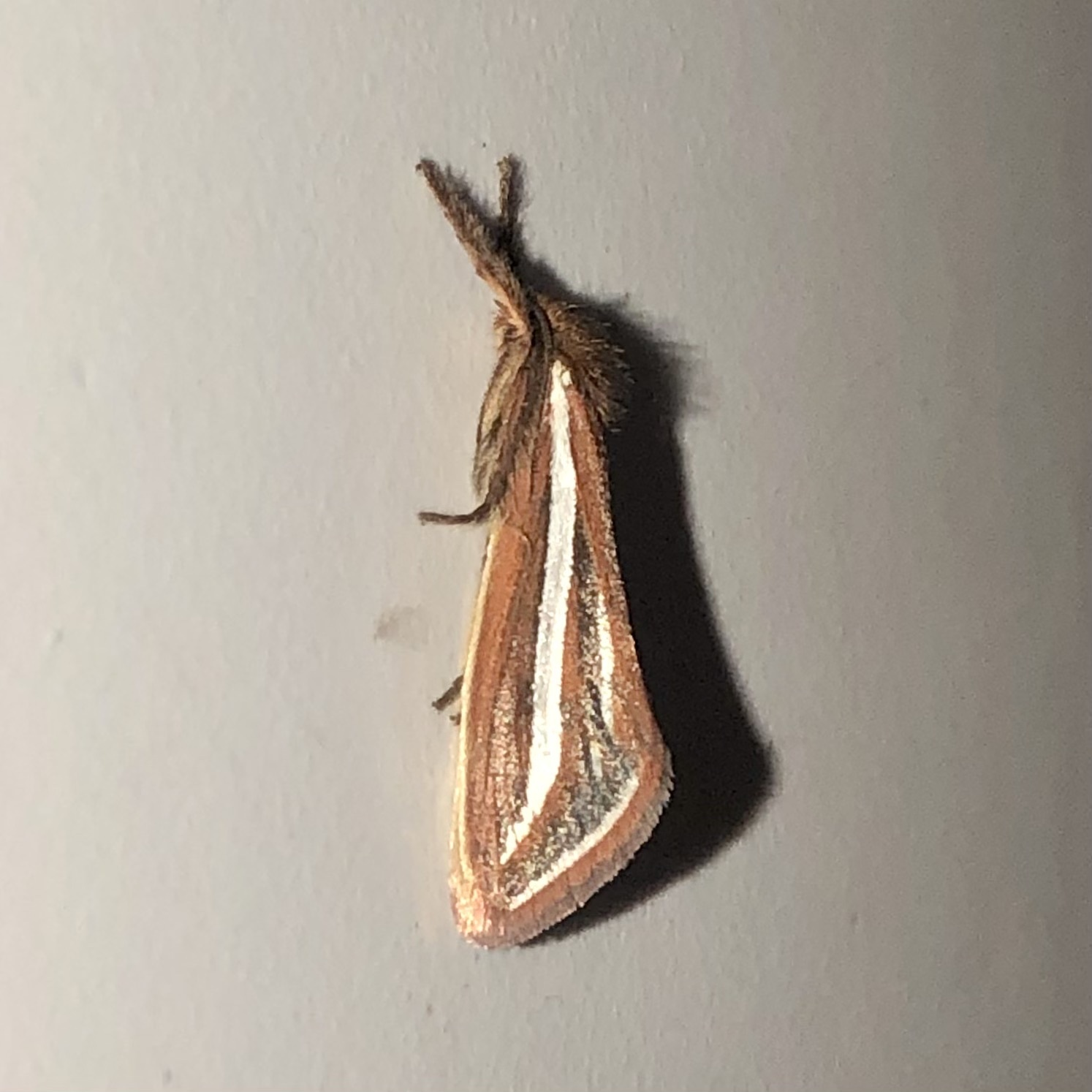

Scientific classification
- Kingdom: Animalia
- Phylum: Arthropoda
- Class: Insecta
- Order: Lepidoptera
- Family: Hepialidae
- Genus: Fraus
- Species: F. orientalis

Binomial name
- Fraus orientalis Nielsen and Kristensen, 1989

= Fraus orientalis =

Species of moth

Fraus orientalis is a species of moth in the family Hepialidae. It is endemic to New South Wales, Australia.
