= Fraus minima =

Scientific classification
- Kingdom: Animalia
- Phylum: Arthropoda
- Class: Insecta
- Order: Lepidoptera
- Family: Hepialidae
- Genus: Fraus
- Species: F. minima

Binomial name
- Fraus minima Nielsen and Kristensen, 1989

Species of moth

Fraus minima is a moth of the family Hepialidae. It is endemic to New South Wales, South Australia, Tasmania and Victoria.
