= Oxycanus diakonoffi =

Scientific classification
- Kingdom: Animalia
- Phylum: Arthropoda
- Class: Insecta
- Order: Lepidoptera
- Family: Hepialidae
- Genus: Oxycanus
- Species: O. diakonoffi

Binomial name
- Oxycanus diakonoffi (Viette, 1956)

Synonyms
- Paraoxycanus diakonoffi Viette, 1956

Species of moth

Oxycanus diakonoffi is a moth of the family Hepialidae. It is found in New Guinea.
