= Oxycanus tyres =

Scientific classification
- Kingdom: Animalia
- Phylum: Arthropoda
- Class: Insecta
- Order: Lepidoptera
- Family: Hepialidae
- Genus: Oxycanus
- Species: O. tyres

Binomial name
- Oxycanus tyres (Viette, 1956)

Synonyms
- Paraoxycanus tyres Viette, 1956

Species of moth

Oxycanus tyres is a moth of the family Hepialidae. It is found in New Guinea.
