= Oxycanus salmonacea =

Scientific classification
- Kingdom: Animalia
- Phylum: Arthropoda
- Class: Insecta
- Order: Lepidoptera
- Family: Hepialidae
- Genus: Oxycanus
- Species: O. salmonacea

Binomial name
- Oxycanus salmonacea (Rothschild and Jordan, 1905)

Synonyms
- Porina salmonacea Rothschild and Jordan, 1905

Species of moth

Oxycanus salmonacea is a moth of the family Hepialidae. It is found in New Guinea.
