= Oxycanus novaeguineensis =

Scientific classification
- Kingdom: Animalia
- Phylum: Arthropoda
- Class: Insecta
- Order: Lepidoptera
- Family: Hepialidae
- Genus: Oxycanus
- Species: O. novaeguineensis

Binomial name
- Oxycanus novaeguineensis (Viette, 1950)

Synonyms
- Paraoxycanus novaeguineensis Viette, 1950

Species of moth

Oxycanus novaeguineensis is a moth of the family Hepialidae. It is found in New Guinea.
