= Oxycanus perplexus =

Scientific classification
- Kingdom: Animalia
- Phylum: Arthropoda
- Class: Insecta
- Order: Lepidoptera
- Family: Hepialidae
- Genus: Oxycanus
- Species: O. perplexus

Binomial name
- Oxycanus perplexus Tindale, 1955

Species of moth

Oxycanus perplexus is a moth of the family Hepialidae. It is found in New Guinea.
