= Bipectilus =

Scientific classification
- Domain: Eukaryota
- Kingdom: Animalia
- Phylum: Arthropoda
- Class: Insecta
- Order: Lepidoptera
- Family: Hepialidae
- Genus: Bipectilus; Chu and Wang, 1985

Species
- See text.

Synonyms
- Bipectilis

Genus of moths

Bipectilus is a genus of moths of the family Hepialidae. There are eight described species in the genus, distributed through China, Nepal and Vietnam.

== Species ==
- Bipectilus gracilirami
- Bipectilus latirami
- Bipectilus omaiensis
- Bipectilus paraunimacula
- Bipectilus perfuscus
- Bipectilus tindalei
- Bipectilus unimacula
- Bipectilus yunnanensis
- Bipectilus zhejiangensis
