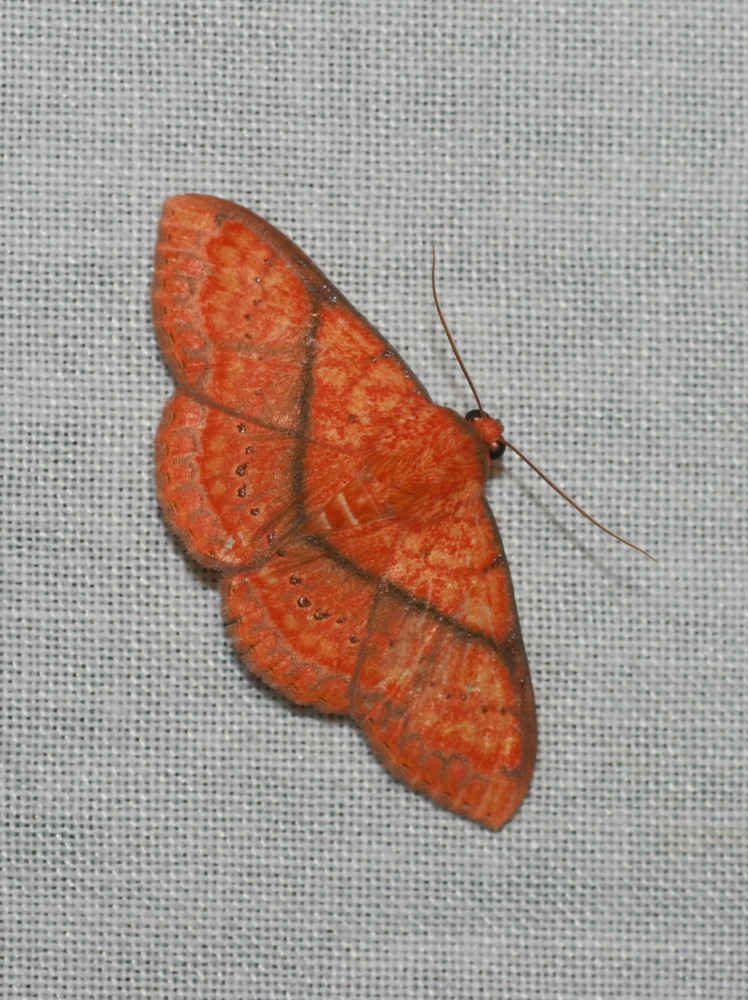

Scientific classification
- Kingdom: Animalia
- Phylum: Arthropoda
- Class: Insecta
- Order: Lepidoptera
- Superfamily: Noctuoidea
- Family: Erebidae
- Subfamily: Boletobiinae
- Genus: Homodes; Guenée in Boisduval & Guenée, 1852

Synonyms
- Philecia Walker, 1861

= Homodes =

Genus of moths

Homodes is a genus of moths of the family Erebidae first described by Achille Guenée in 1852.

== Taxonomy ==
The genus has previously been classified in the subfamily Calpinae of the family Noctuidae.

== Description ==
Palpi upturned and reaching vertex of head, where the third joint very minute. Antennae ciliated. Thorax smoothly scaled. Abdomen with dorsal tufts on proximal segments. Tibia nearly smooth. Forelegs of male with a tuft of long hair from base of coxa. Forewing with round apex. Hindwings with vein 5 from near center of discocellulars.

== Species ==
- Homodes bracteigutta (Walker, 1862) India, Thailand, Peninsular Malaysia, Borneo, Saleyer, New Guinea, N.Queensland
- Homodes crocea Guenée, 1852 India, Thailand, Andamans, Sundaland, Sulawesi, Seram, Kei, New Guinea, Bismarcks
- Homodes fulva Hampson, 1896 Sri Lanka, Borneo
- Homodes lassula Prout, 1928 Sumatra, Borneo
- Homodes iomolybda Meyrick, 1889 India (Meghalaya), New Guinea
- Homodes lithographa Hampson, 1926 Solomon Islands
- Homodes magnifica Viette, 1958 Madagascar
- Homodes muluensis Holloway, 2005 Borneo
- Homodes ornata Roepke, 1938 northern Sulawesi
- Homodes perilitha Hampson, 1926 southern India, Borneo, Philippines
- Homodes vivida Guenée, 1852 India, Sri Lanka, Myanmar, Singapore, Borneo, Sulawesi
