= Oxycanus altenai =

Scientific classification
- Kingdom: Animalia
- Phylum: Arthropoda
- Class: Insecta
- Order: Lepidoptera
- Family: Hepialidae
- Genus: Oxycanus
- Species: O. altenai

Binomial name
- Oxycanus altenai (Viette, 1956)

Synonyms
- Paraoxycanus altenai Viette, 1956

Species of moth

Oxycanus altenai is a moth of the family Hepialidae. It is found in New Guinea.
