= Oxycanus thasus =

Scientific classification
- Kingdom: Animalia
- Phylum: Arthropoda
- Class: Insecta
- Order: Lepidoptera
- Family: Hepialidae
- Genus: Oxycanus
- Species: O. thasus

Binomial name
- Oxycanus thasus Tindale, 1955

Species of moth

Oxycanus thasus is a moth of the family Hepialidae. It is found in New Guinea.
