= Oxycanus goodingi =

Scientific classification
- Kingdom: Animalia
- Phylum: Arthropoda
- Clade: Pancrustacea
- Class: Insecta
- Order: Lepidoptera
- Family: Hepialidae
- Genus: Oxycanus
- Species: O. goodingi

Binomial name
- Oxycanus goodingi Tindale, 1935

Species of moth

Oxycanus goodingi is a moth of the family Hepialidae. It is found in Australia.

The larvae feed underground, probably on the roots of Leptospermum scoparium.
