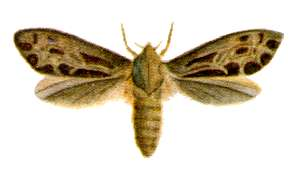

Scientific classification
- Kingdom: Animalia
- Phylum: Arthropoda
- Class: Insecta
- Order: Lepidoptera
- Family: Hepialidae
- Genus: Oncopera
- Species: O. intricata

Binomial name
- Oncopera intricata Walker, 1856

= Oncopera intricata =

Species of moth

The Tasmanian grassgrub or corbie (Oncopera intricata) is a moth of the family Hepialidae. It is found in Tasmania.

The larvae feed on Fragaria species as well as grasses.
