= Jeana delicatula =

Scientific classification
- Domain: Eukaryota
- Kingdom: Animalia
- Phylum: Arthropoda
- Class: Insecta
- Order: Lepidoptera
- Family: Hepialidae
- Genus: Jeana
- Species: J. delicatula

Binomial name
- Jeana delicatula Tindale, 1935

Species of moth

Jeana delicatula is a moth of the family Hepialidae. It is endemic to Tasmania and Victoria.

The larvae are subterranean and probably feed on the roots and bases of grasses.
