= Oncopera fasciculatus =

Scientific classification
- Kingdom: Animalia
- Phylum: Arthropoda
- Class: Insecta
- Order: Lepidoptera
- Family: Hepialidae
- Genus: Oncopera
- Species: O. fasciculatus

Binomial name
- Oncopera fasciculatus (Walker, 1869)

Synonyms
- Hepialus fasciculatus Walker, 1869; Oncopera faciulata d’Abrera, 1974

Species of moth

Oncopera fasciculatus, the underground grassgrub, is a moth of the family Hepialidae endemic to South Australia and Victoria.
