= Jeana robiginosa =

Scientific classification
- Domain: Eukaryota
- Kingdom: Animalia
- Phylum: Arthropoda
- Class: Insecta
- Order: Lepidoptera
- Family: Hepialidae
- Genus: Jeana
- Species: J. robiginosa

Binomial name
- Jeana robiginosa Turner, 1939

Synonyms
- Jeana rubiginosa Turner, 1939; Jeana timetea Turner, 1939

Species of moth

Jeana robiginosa is a moth of the family Hepialidae. It is endemic to Tasmania.
