= Oxycanus hildae =

Scientific classification
- Kingdom: Animalia
- Phylum: Arthropoda
- Clade: Pancrustacea
- Class: Insecta
- Order: Lepidoptera
- Family: Hepialidae
- Genus: Oxycanus
- Species: O. hildae

Binomial name
- Oxycanus hildae Tindale, 1964

Species of moth

Oxycanus hildae is a moth of the family Hepialidae found in New South Wales and Victoria.
