= Oxycanus kochi =

Scientific classification
- Kingdom: Animalia
- Phylum: Arthropoda
- Clade: Pancrustacea
- Class: Insecta
- Order: Lepidoptera
- Family: Hepialidae
- Genus: Oxycanus
- Species: O. kochi

Binomial name
- Oxycanus kochi Tindale, 1955

Species of moth

Oxycanus kochi is a moth of the family Hepialidae. It is found in all of Australia.
