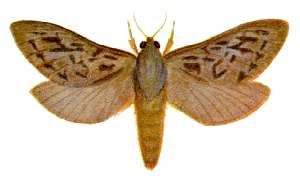

Scientific classification
- Kingdom: Animalia
- Phylum: Arthropoda
- Clade: Pancrustacea
- Class: Insecta
- Order: Lepidoptera
- Family: Hepialidae
- Genus: Oxycanus
- Species: O. antipoda

Binomial name
- Oxycanus antipoda (Herrich-Schäffer, 1853)

Synonyms
- Epiolus antipoda Herrich-Schäffer, 1853; Oxycanus fuscomasculatus Walker, 1856; Epiolus sordidus Herrich-Schäffer, [1853]; Oxycanus pardalinus Walker, 1865

= Oxycanus antipoda =

Species of moth

Oxycanus antipoda is a moth of the family Hepialidae. It is found in Tasmania and Victoria.

The larvae feed on grasses.
