= Jeana (given name) =

Jeana is a feminine given name. Notable people with the name include:

- Jeana Keough (born 1955), American television personality, realtor, actress, and model
- Jeana Ross, American politician from Alabama
- Jeana Varnell, survivor of American Airlines Flight 1420
- Jeana Yeager (born 1952), American aviator
