= Oxycanus sphragidias =

Scientific classification
- Kingdom: Animalia
- Phylum: Arthropoda
- Clade: Pancrustacea
- Class: Insecta
- Order: Lepidoptera
- Family: Hepialidae
- Genus: Oxycanus
- Species: O. sphragidias

Binomial name
- Oxycanus sphragidias (Meyrick, 1890)

Synonyms
- Porina sphragidias Meyrick, 1890

Species of moth

Oxycanus sphragidias is a moth of the family Hepialidae. It is found in Tasmania.
