= Oncopera alpina =

Scientific classification
- Domain: Eukaryota
- Kingdom: Animalia
- Phylum: Arthropoda
- Class: Insecta
- Order: Lepidoptera
- Family: Hepialidae
- Genus: Oncopera
- Species: O. alpina

Binomial name
- Oncopera alpina Tindale, 1933

Synonyms
- Oncopera nebulosa Tindale, 1933

Species of moth

Oncopera alpina is a moth of the family Hepialidae. It is found in the Australian Capital Territory, New South Wales and Victoria.

The larvae are subterranean and feed on roots and bases of snow grasses (Poa species).
