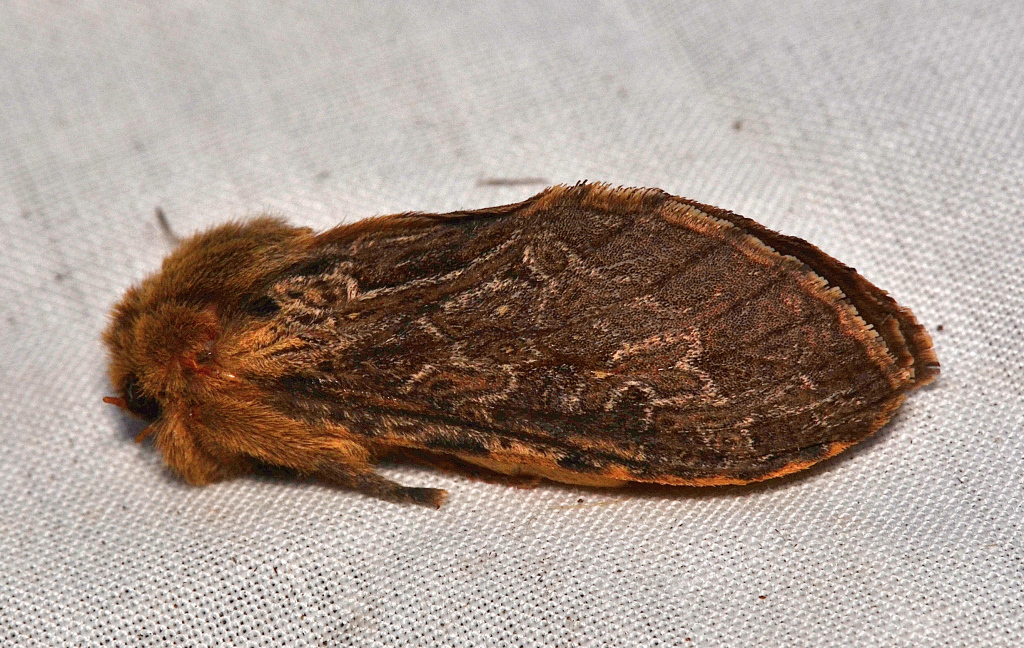

Scientific classification
- Domain: Eukaryota
- Kingdom: Animalia
- Phylum: Arthropoda
- Class: Insecta
- Order: Lepidoptera
- Family: Hepialidae
- Genus: Oncopera
- Species: O. rufobrunnea

Binomial name
- Oncopera rufobrunnea Tindale, 1933

= Oncopera rufobrunnea =

Species of moth

Oncopera rufobrunnea is a moth of the family Hepialidae. It is endemic to the Australian Capital Territory, New South Wales, Tasmania, Victoria and South Australia.

The larvae are subterranean and feed on roots and bases of grasses in native and sown pastures.

The males have a smaller wingspan than the females, measuring 5 cm and 6 cm respectively.
