= Oxycanus determinata =

Scientific classification
- Kingdom: Animalia
- Phylum: Arthropoda
- Clade: Pancrustacea
- Class: Insecta
- Order: Lepidoptera
- Family: Hepialidae
- Genus: Oxycanus
- Species: O. determinata

Binomial name
- Oxycanus determinata (Walker, 1856)

Synonyms
- Elhamma determinata Walker, 1856

Species of moth

Oxycanus determinata is a moth of the family Hepialidae. It is found in Western Australia.
