= Oxycanus byrsa =

Scientific classification
- Kingdom: Animalia
- Phylum: Arthropoda
- Clade: Pancrustacea
- Class: Insecta
- Order: Lepidoptera
- Family: Hepialidae
- Genus: Oxycanus
- Species: O. byrsa

Binomial name
- Oxycanus byrsa (Pfitzner, 1914)

Synonyms
- Pielus byrsa Pfitzner, 1914

Species of moth

Oxycanus byrsa is a moth of the family Hepialidae. It is found in New South Wales.
