= Oncopera alboguttata =

Scientific classification
- Domain: Eukaryota
- Kingdom: Animalia
- Phylum: Arthropoda
- Class: Insecta
- Order: Lepidoptera
- Family: Hepialidae
- Genus: Oncopera
- Species: O. alboguttata

Binomial name
- Oncopera alboguttata Tindale, 1933

Species of moth

Oncopera alboguttata is a moth of the family Hepialidae. It is found in New South Wales and Queensland.

The larvae are subterranean and feed on the roots and bases of grasses in native and sown pastures.
