= Oxycanus lyelli =

Scientific classification
- Kingdom: Animalia
- Phylum: Arthropoda
- Clade: Pancrustacea
- Class: Insecta
- Order: Lepidoptera
- Family: Hepialidae
- Genus: Oxycanus
- Species: O. lyelli

Binomial name
- Oxycanus lyelli Tindale, 1935

Species of moth

Oxycanus lyelli is a moth of the family Hepialidae. It is found in Victoria.
