= Oxycanus maculosus =

Scientific classification
- Kingdom: Animalia
- Phylum: Arthropoda
- Clade: Pancrustacea
- Class: Insecta
- Order: Lepidoptera
- Family: Hepialidae
- Genus: Oxycanus
- Species: O. maculosus

Binomial name
- Oxycanus maculosus (Felder, 1874)

Synonyms
- Pielus maculosus Felder, 1874

Species of moth

Oxycanus maculosus is a moth of the family Hepialidae. It is found in New South Wales.
