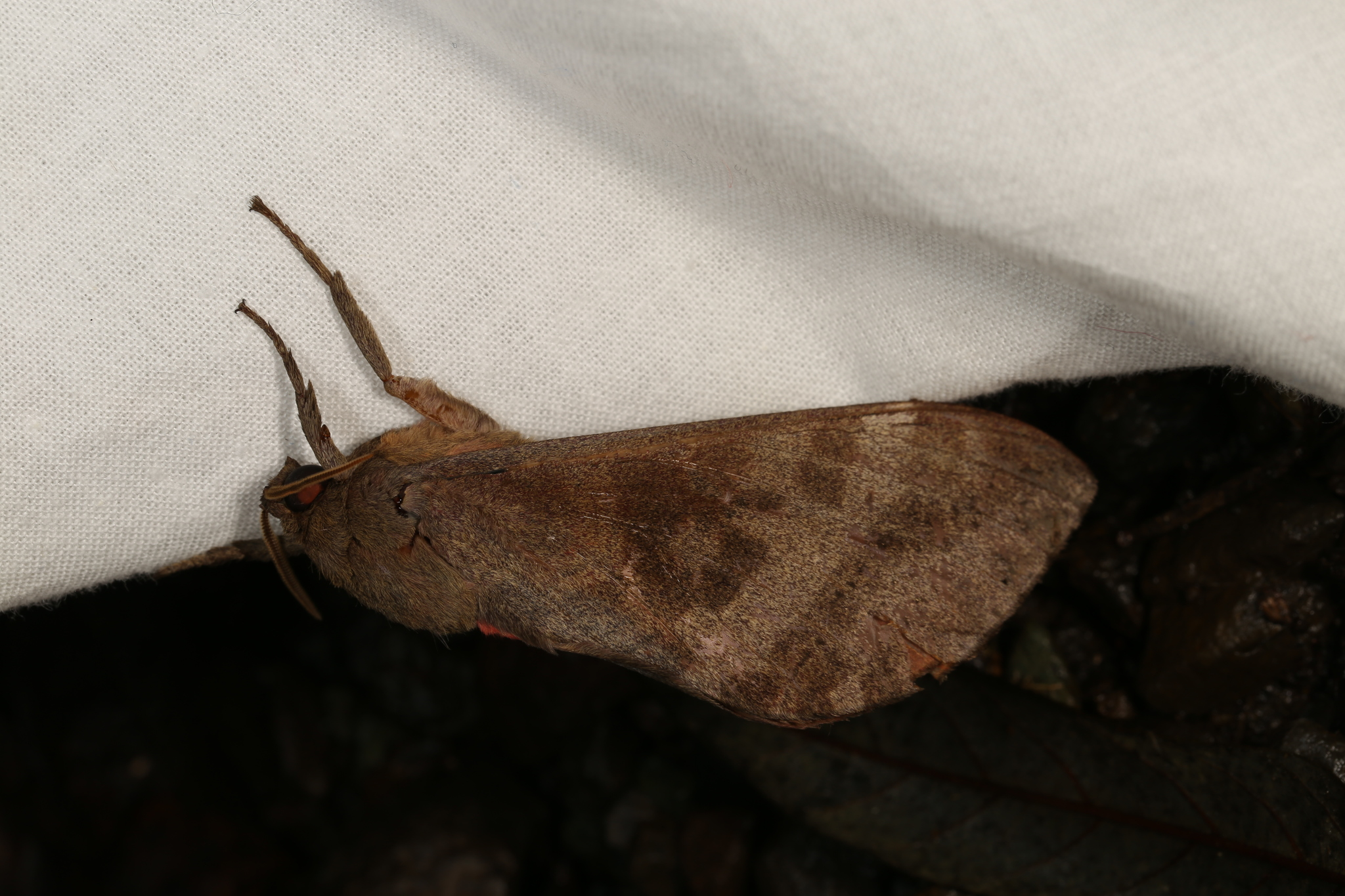

Scientific classification
- Kingdom: Animalia
- Phylum: Arthropoda
- Clade: Pancrustacea
- Class: Insecta
- Order: Lepidoptera
- Family: Hepialidae
- Genus: Oxycanus
- Species: O. beltista

Binomial name
- Oxycanus beltista (Turner, 1926)

Synonyms
- Porina beltista Turner, 1926

= Oxycanus beltista =

Species of moth

Oxycanus beltista is a moth of the family Hepialidae. It is found in Queensland.
