= Oxycanus naias =

Scientific classification
- Kingdom: Animalia
- Phylum: Arthropoda
- Clade: Pancrustacea
- Class: Insecta
- Order: Lepidoptera
- Family: Hepialidae
- Genus: Oxycanus
- Species: O. naias

Binomial name
- Oxycanus naias Tindale, 1935

Species of moth

Oxycanus naias is a moth of the family Hepialidae. It is found in New South Wales.
