= Oxycanus poeticus =

Scientific classification
- Kingdom: Animalia
- Phylum: Arthropoda
- Clade: Pancrustacea
- Class: Insecta
- Order: Lepidoptera
- Family: Hepialidae
- Genus: Oxycanus
- Species: O. poeticus

Binomial name
- Oxycanus poeticus Tindale, 1935

Species of moth

Oxycanus poeticus is a moth of the family Hepialidae. It is found in Western Australia.
