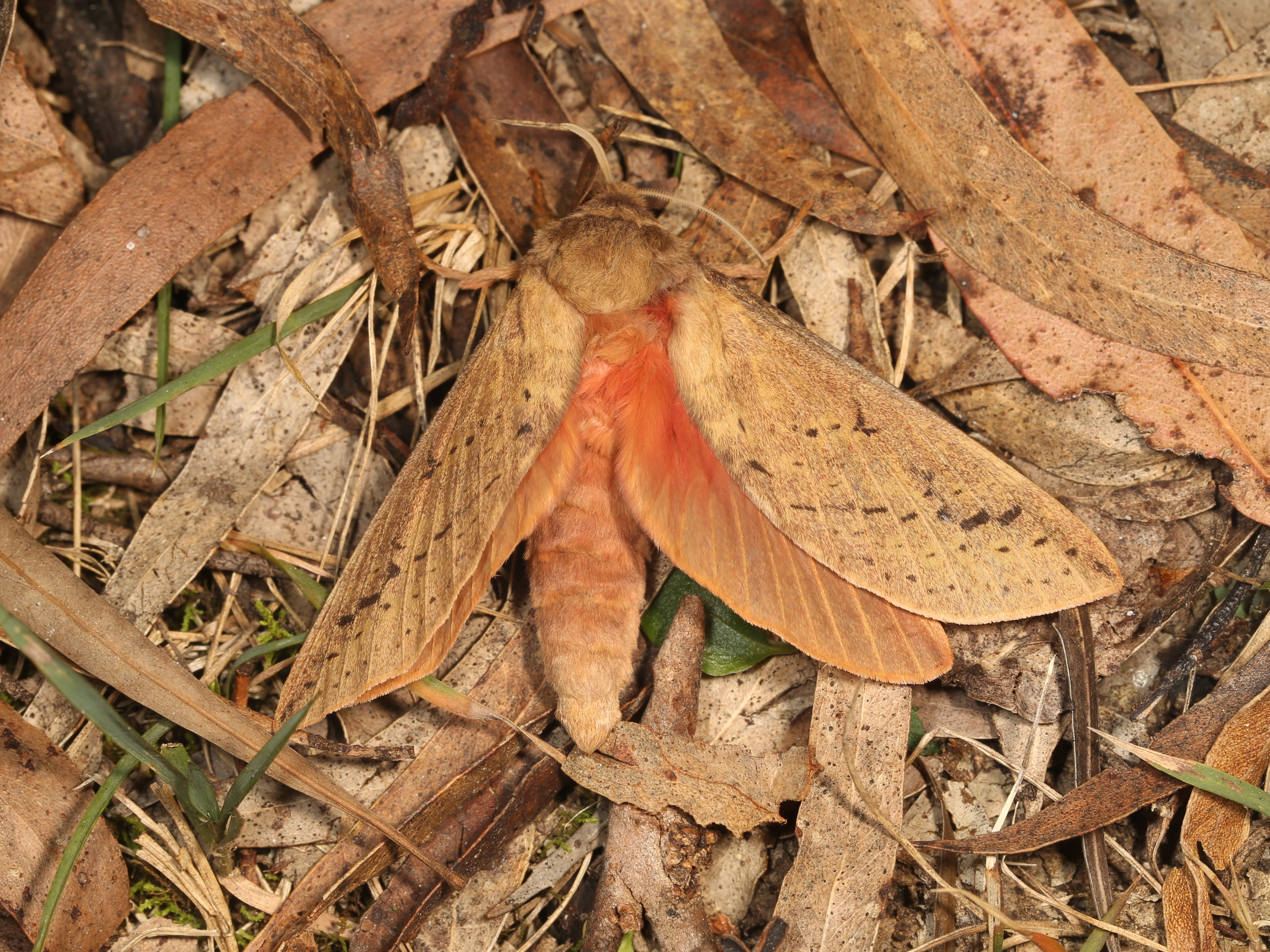

Scientific classification
- Kingdom: Animalia
- Phylum: Arthropoda
- Clade: Pancrustacea
- Class: Insecta
- Order: Lepidoptera
- Family: Hepialidae
- Genus: Oxycanus
- Species: O. subvaria

Binomial name
- Oxycanus subvaria (Walker, 1856)

Synonyms
- Elhamma subvaria Walker, 1856; Oxycanus subvarius Walker, 1856; Oxycanus lamnus Tindale, 1935

= Oxycanus subvaria =

Species of moth

Oxycanus subvaria is a moth of the family Hepialidae. It is found in New South Wales, Tasmania and Victoria.
