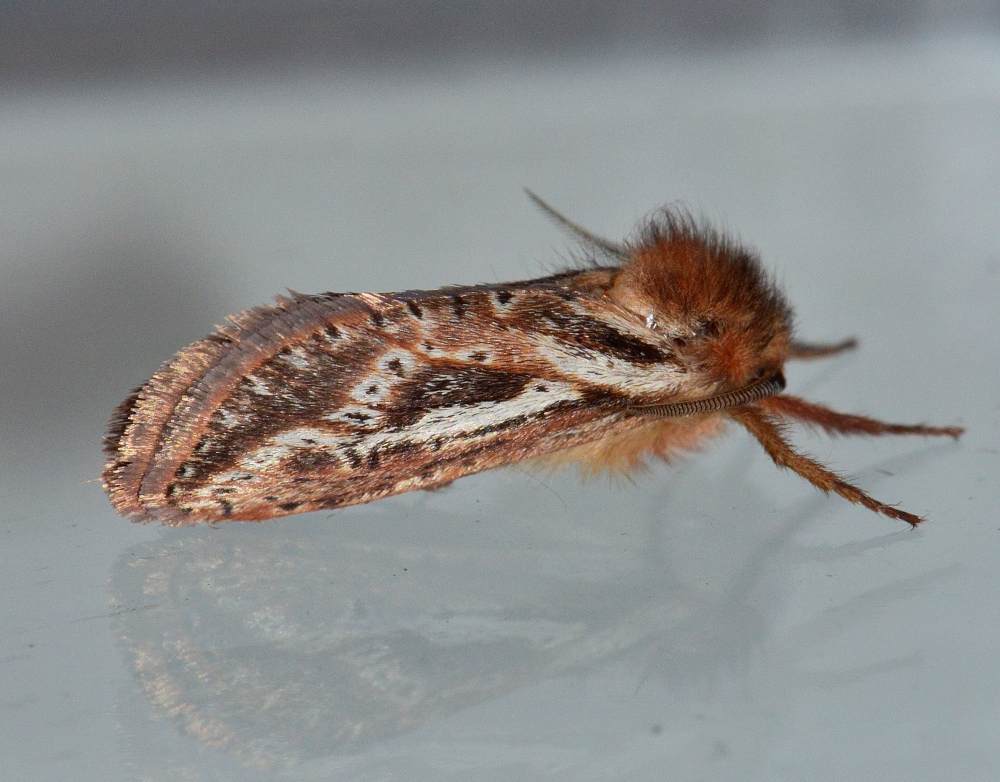

Scientific classification
- Kingdom: Animalia
- Phylum: Arthropoda
- Class: Insecta
- Order: Lepidoptera
- Family: Hepialidae
- Genus: Fraus
- Species: F. simulans

Binomial name
- Fraus simulans Walker, 1856

Synonyms
- Hectomanes noserodes Meyrick, 1890

= Fraus simulans =

Species of moth

Fraus simulans, the lesser ghost moth, is a moth of the family Hepialidae. It is endemic to the Australian Capital Territory, New South Wales, Queensland, South Australia, Tasmania, Victoria and Western Australia. Adults are on wing from late March to early April in one generation per year.
