= Oncopera mitocera =

Scientific classification
- Kingdom: Animalia
- Phylum: Arthropoda
- Class: Insecta
- Order: Lepidoptera
- Family: Hepialidae
- Genus: Oncopera
- Species: O. mitocera

Binomial name
- Oncopera mitocera Turner, 1911

Synonyms
- Oncopera lineata Aurivillius, 1920; Oncopera suffusa Aurivillius, 1920; Oncopera vittata Aurivillius, 1920

Species of moth

Oncopera mitocera is a moth of the family Hepialidae. It is found in Queensland, Australia.

The wingspan is about 30 millimetres (1.2 in). Adults have wings with little discernible pattern.

The larvae are subterranean and feed on the roots and bases of grasses in native and sown pastures, including Digitaria, Panicum and Setaria.
