= Oxycanus oreades =

Scientific classification
- Kingdom: Animalia
- Phylum: Arthropoda
- Clade: Pancrustacea
- Class: Insecta
- Order: Lepidoptera
- Family: Hepialidae
- Genus: Oxycanus
- Species: O. oreades

Binomial name
- Oxycanus oreades E.D. Edwards & K. Green, 2011

Species of moth

Oxycanus oreades is a moth of the family Hepialidae. It is found in New South Wales, Australia.
