= Fraus fusca =

Scientific classification
- Domain: Eukaryota
- Kingdom: Animalia
- Phylum: Arthropoda
- Class: Insecta
- Order: Lepidoptera
- Family: Hepialidae
- Genus: Fraus
- Species: F. fusca

Binomial name
- Fraus fusca (T.P. Lucas, 1891)

Synonyms
- Hectomanes fusca Lucas, 1891; Hectomanes rufula Turner, 1927

Species of moth

Fraus fusca is a moth of the family Hepialidae. It is found in the Australian Capital Territory, New South Wales Tasmania and Victoria.
