= Oxycanus aedesima =

Scientific classification
- Kingdom: Animalia
- Phylum: Arthropoda
- Clade: Pancrustacea
- Class: Insecta
- Order: Lepidoptera
- Family: Hepialidae
- Genus: Oxycanus
- Species: O. aedesima

Binomial name
- Oxycanus aedesima (Turner, 1929)

Synonyms
- Porina aedesima Turner, 1929

Species of moth

Oxycanus aedesima is a moth of the family Hepialidae. It is found in Queensland.
