= Bordaia pica =

Scientific classification
- Kingdom: Animalia
- Phylum: Arthropoda
- Clade: Pancrustacea
- Class: Insecta
- Order: Lepidoptera
- Family: Hepialidae
- Genus: Bordaia
- Species: B. pica

Binomial name
- Bordaia pica Tindale, 1932

Species of moth

Bordaia pica is a species of moth of the family Hepialidae. It is endemic to South Australia, Victoria and Western Australia.
