= Fraus polyspila =

Scientific classification
- Kingdom: Animalia
- Phylum: Arthropoda
- Class: Insecta
- Order: Lepidoptera
- Family: Hepialidae
- Genus: Fraus
- Species: F. polyspila

Binomial name
- Fraus polyspila (Meyrick, 1890)

Synonyms
- Hectomanes polyspila Meyrick, 1890

Species of moth

Fraus polyspila is a moth of the family Hepialidae. It is endemic to New South Wales, South Australia, Victoria and Western Australia.

Adults are on wing in May.

The larvae have been recorded feeding on Ehrharta species. They create tunnels of about 20 cm deep.
