= Bordaia furva =

Scientific classification
- Kingdom: Animalia
- Phylum: Arthropoda
- Clade: Pancrustacea
- Class: Insecta
- Order: Lepidoptera
- Family: Hepialidae
- Genus: Bordaia
- Species: B. furva

Binomial name
- Bordaia furva Tindale, 1932

Species of moth of the family Hepialidae from Western Australia

Bordaia furva is a species of moth of the family Hepialidae. It is endemic to Western Australia.
