= Jeana (moth) =

Scientific classification
- Domain: Eukaryota
- Kingdom: Animalia
- Phylum: Arthropoda
- Class: Insecta
- Order: Lepidoptera
- Family: Hepialidae
- Genus: Jeana; Tindale, 1935

Species
- J. delicatula Tindale, 1935; J. robiginosa Turner, 1939

Genus of moths

Jeana is a genus of moths of the family Hepialidae. There are two described species, both endemic to Australia:

- Jeana delicatula – Tasmania and Victoria
- Jeana robiginosa – Tasmania
