= Bordaia moesta =

Scientific classification
- Domain: Eukaryota
- Kingdom: Animalia
- Phylum: Arthropoda
- Class: Insecta
- Order: Lepidoptera
- Family: Hepialidae
- Genus: Bordaia
- Species: B. moesta

Binomial name
- Bordaia moesta Tindale, 1932

Species of moth

Bordaia moesta is a species of moth of the family Hepialidae. It is endemic to Western Australia.
