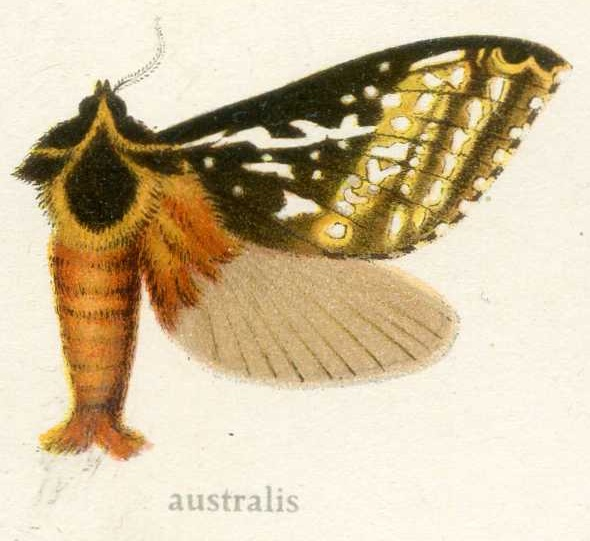

Scientific classification
- Kingdom: Animalia
- Phylum: Arthropoda
- Clade: Pancrustacea
- Class: Insecta
- Order: Lepidoptera
- Family: Hepialidae
- Genus: Oxycanus
- Species: O. australis

Binomial name
- Oxycanus australis Walker, 1856

= Oxycanus australis =

Species of moth

Oxycanus australis is a moth of the family Hepialidae. It is found in South Australia, Tasmania and Victoria.

The larvae possibly feed on Leptospermum laevigatum.
