= Bordaia karnka =

Scientific classification
- Kingdom: Animalia
- Phylum: Arthropoda
- Clade: Pancrustacea
- Class: Insecta
- Order: Lepidoptera
- Family: Hepialidae
- Genus: Bordaia
- Species: B. karnka

Binomial name
- Bordaia karnka Tindale, 1941

Species of moth

Bordaia karnka is a species of moth of the family Hepialidae. It is endemic to Western Australia.
