= Oxycanus niphadias =

Scientific classification
- Kingdom: Animalia
- Phylum: Arthropoda
- Clade: Pancrustacea
- Class: Insecta
- Order: Lepidoptera
- Family: Hepialidae
- Genus: Oxycanus
- Species: O. niphadias

Binomial name
- Oxycanus niphadias (Meyrick, 1890)

Synonyms
- Porina niphadias Meyrick, 1890

Species of moth

Oxycanus niphadias is a moth of the family Hepialidae. It is found in South Australia.
