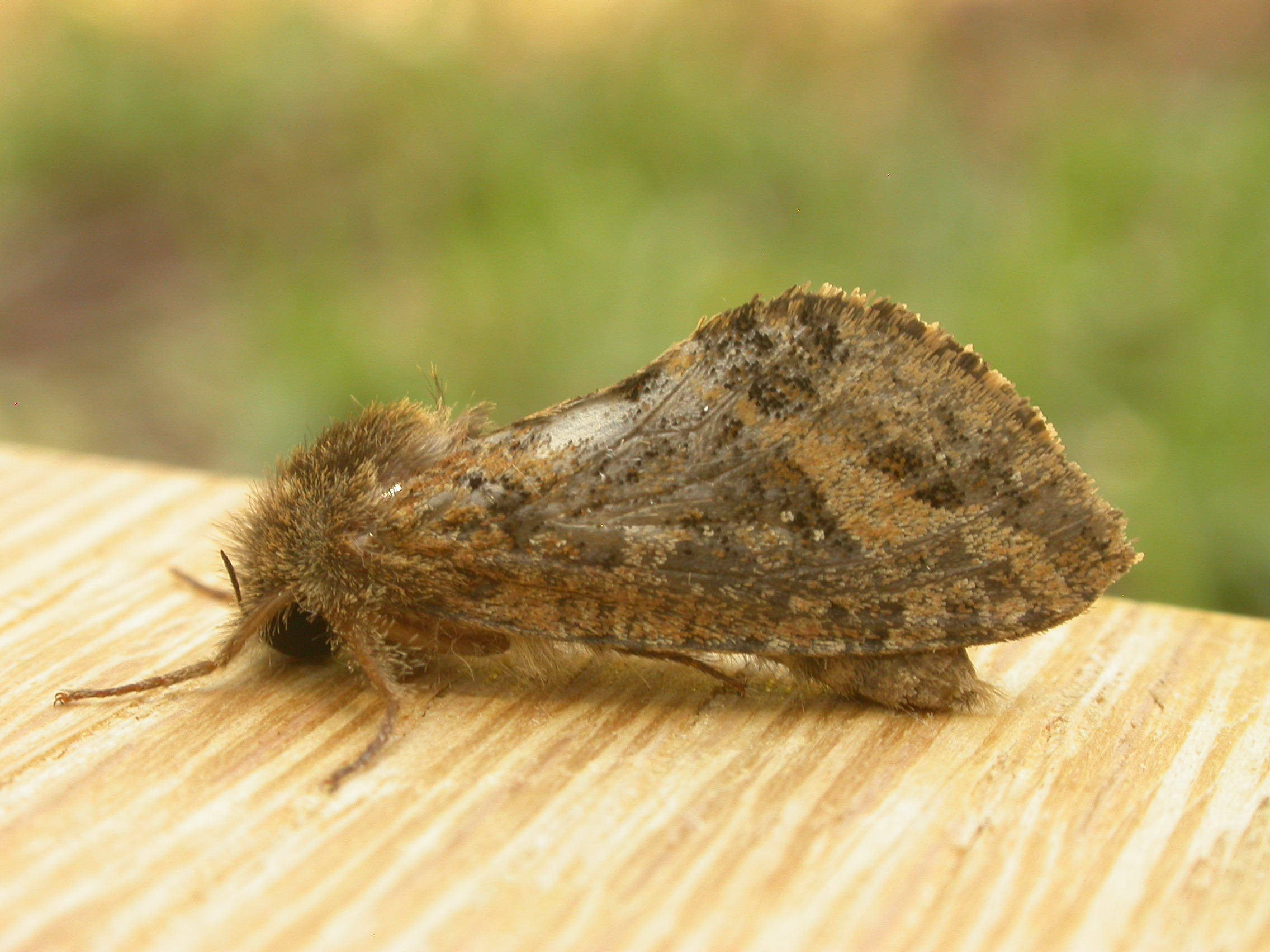

Scientific classification
- Domain: Eukaryota
- Kingdom: Animalia
- Phylum: Arthropoda
- Class: Insecta
- Order: Lepidoptera
- Family: Hepialidae
- Genus: Oncopera
- Species: O. brunneata

Binomial name
- Oncopera brunneata Tindale, 1933

= Oncopera brunneata =

Species of moth

Oncopera brunneata is a moth of the family Hepialidae. It is found in eastern Australia.

The larvae feed on dead leaves.
