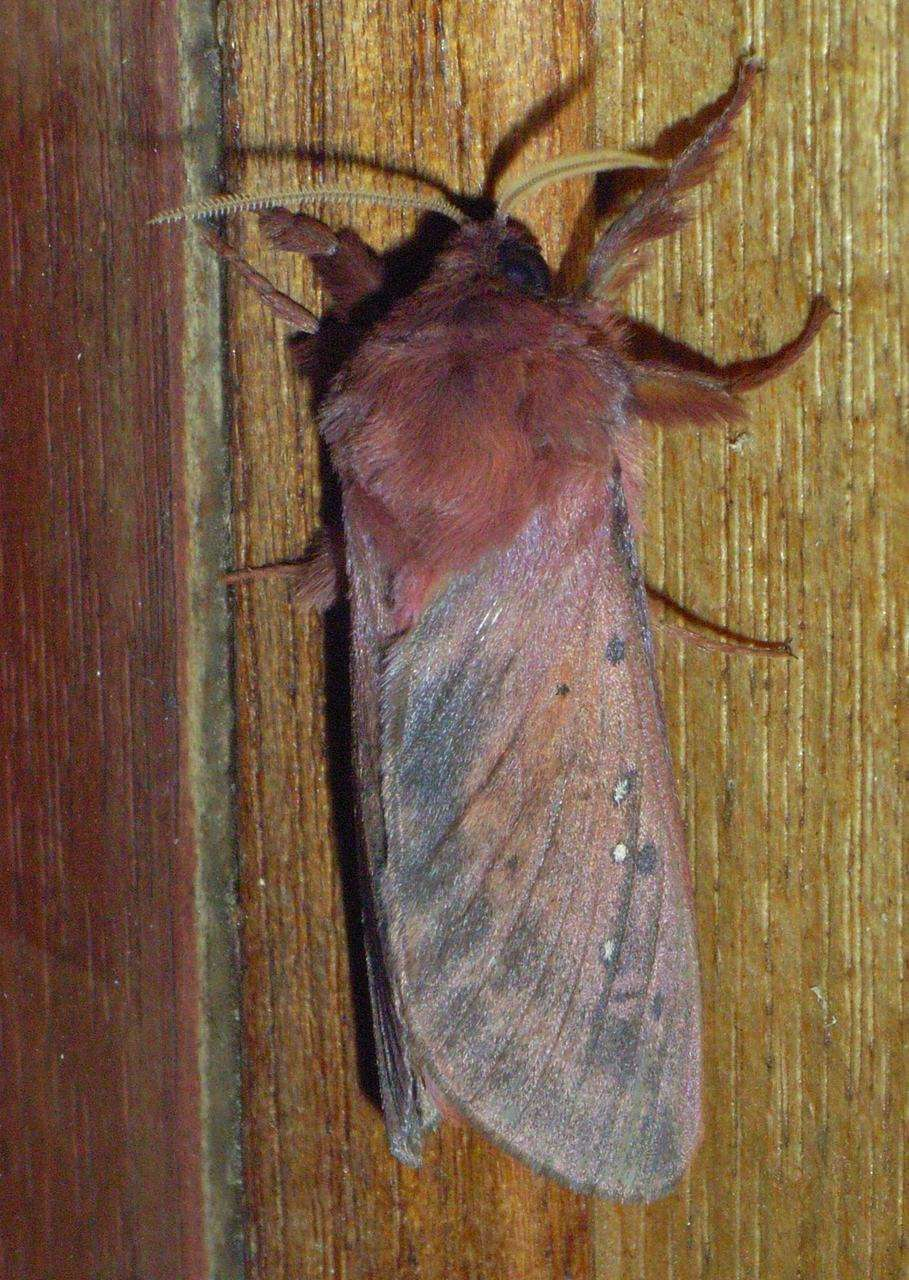

Scientific classification
- Kingdom: Animalia
- Phylum: Arthropoda
- Clade: Pancrustacea
- Class: Insecta
- Order: Lepidoptera
- Family: Hepialidae
- Genus: Oxycanus
- Species: O. rufescens

Binomial name
- Oxycanus rufescens Walker, 1856

Synonyms
- Pielus invarius Walker, 1865

= Oxycanus rufescens =

Species of moth

Oxycanus rufescens is a moth of the family Hepialidae. It is found in the Australian Capital Territory, New South Wales, Tasmania and Victoria.
