= Elachista galatheae =

Scientific classification
- Kingdom: Animalia
- Phylum: Arthropoda
- Class: Insecta
- Order: Lepidoptera
- Family: Elachistidae
- Genus: Elachista
- Species: E. galatheae

Binomial name
- Elachista galatheae (Viette, 1954)

Synonyms
- Euproteodes galatheae Viette, 1954; Irenicodes galatheae antipodensis Dugdale, 1971

Species of moth

Elachista galatheae is a moth in the family Elachistidae. It was described by Pierre Viette in 1954. It is found on Campbell Island and the Antipodes Islands.
