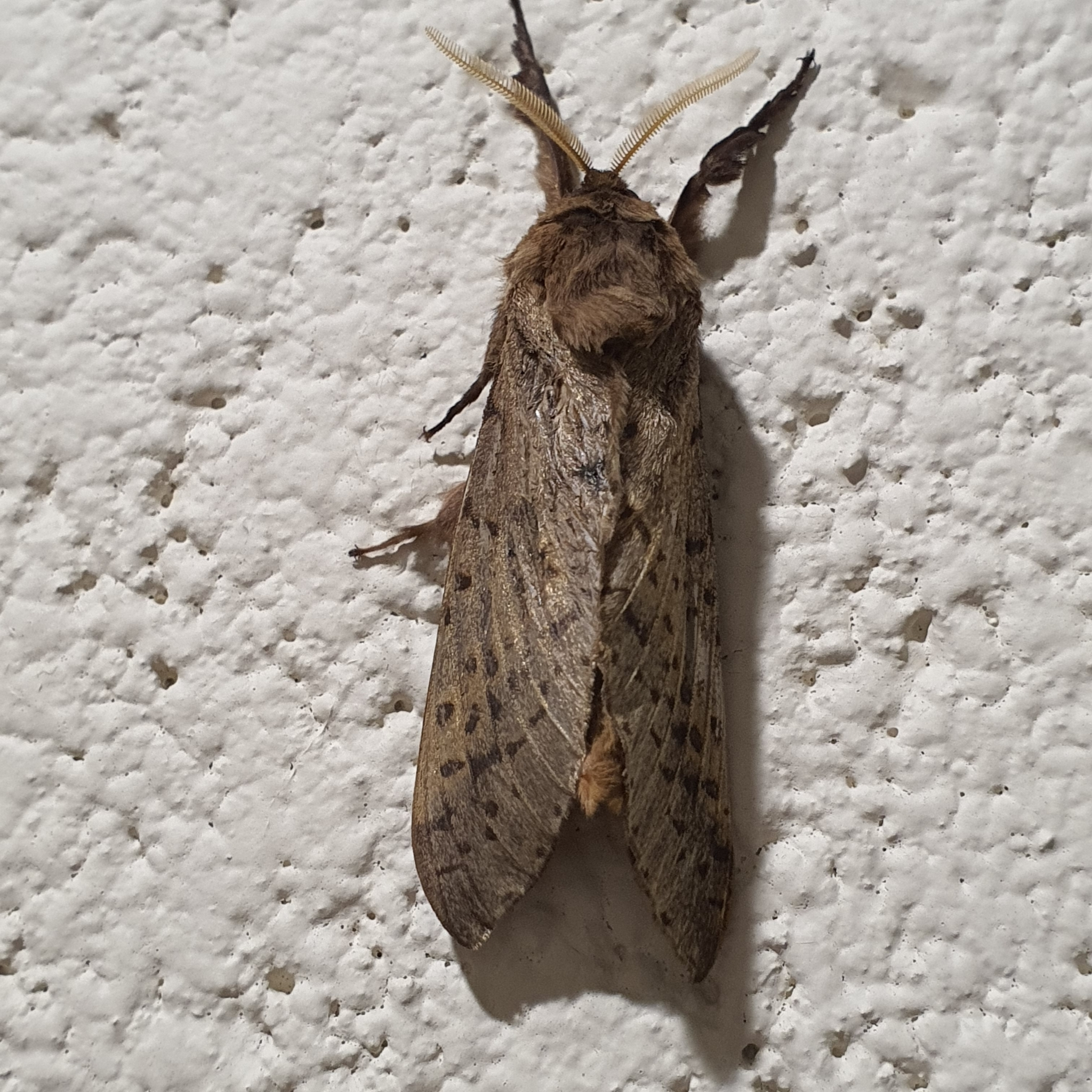

Scientific classification
- Kingdom: Animalia
- Phylum: Arthropoda
- Clade: Pancrustacea
- Class: Insecta
- Order: Lepidoptera
- Family: Hepialidae
- Genus: Oxycanus
- Species: O. silvanus

Binomial name
- Oxycanus silvanus Tindale, 1935

= Oxycanus silvanus =

Species of moth

Oxycanus silvanus is a moth of the family Hepialidae. It is found in the Australian Capital Territory, New South Wales and Victoria.
