= Oncopera epargyra =

Scientific classification
- Domain: Eukaryota
- Kingdom: Animalia
- Phylum: Arthropoda
- Class: Insecta
- Order: Lepidoptera
- Family: Hepialidae
- Genus: Oncopera
- Species: O. epargyra

Binomial name
- Oncopera epargyra Turner, 1925

Species of moth

Oncopera epargyra is a moth of the family Hepialidae. It is endemic to Queensland.

The larvae are subterranean and emerge from the soil to feed. They probably feed on fallen leaves.
