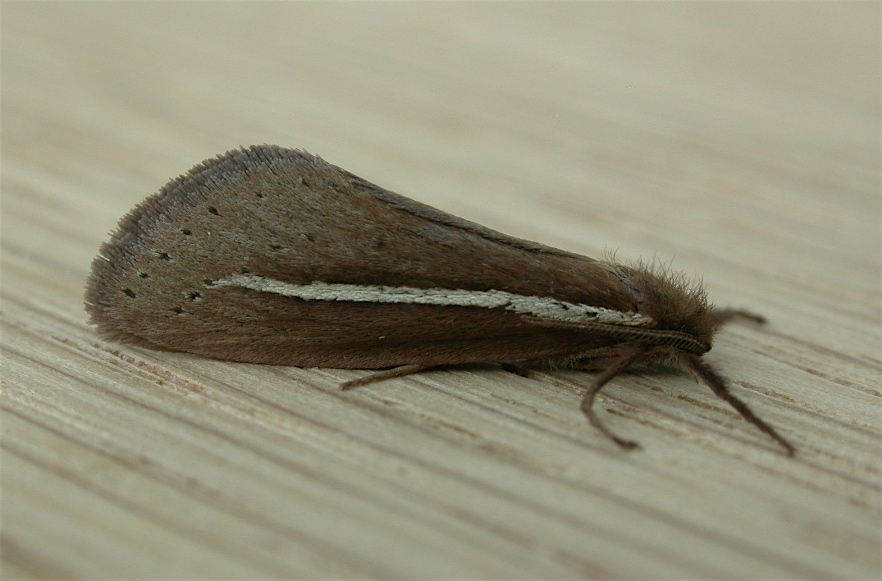

Scientific classification
- Domain: Eukaryota
- Kingdom: Animalia
- Phylum: Arthropoda
- Class: Insecta
- Order: Lepidoptera
- Family: Hepialidae
- Genus: Fraus
- Species: F. pteromela

Binomial name
- Fraus pteromela (Lower, 1892)

Synonyms
- Hectomanes pteromela Lower, 1892

= Fraus pteromela =

Species of moth

Fraus pteromela is a moth of the family Hepialidae. It is found in most of the southern half of Australia.

The wingspan is about 25 mm for males and 35 mm for females.
