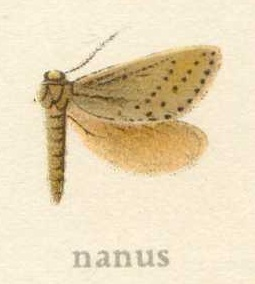

Scientific classification
- Domain: Eukaryota
- Kingdom: Animalia
- Phylum: Arthropoda
- Class: Insecta
- Order: Lepidoptera
- Family: Hepialidae
- Genus: Fraus
- Species: F. nanus

Binomial name
- Fraus nanus (Herrich-Schaffer, [1853])

Synonyms
- Epiolus nanus Herrich-Schaffer, [1853]

= Fraus nanus =

Species of moth

Fraus nanus is a moth of the family Hepialidae. It is endemic to New South Wales, South Australia, Tasmania and Victoria.
