= Fraus pelagia =

Scientific classification
- Domain: Eukaryota
- Kingdom: Animalia
- Phylum: Arthropoda
- Class: Insecta
- Order: Lepidoptera
- Family: Hepialidae
- Genus: Fraus
- Species: F. pelagia

Binomial name
- Fraus pelagia (Turner, 1927)

Synonyms
- Hectomanes pelagia Turner, 1927

Species of moth

Fraus pelagia is a moth of the family Hepialidae. It is endemic to Tasmania.
