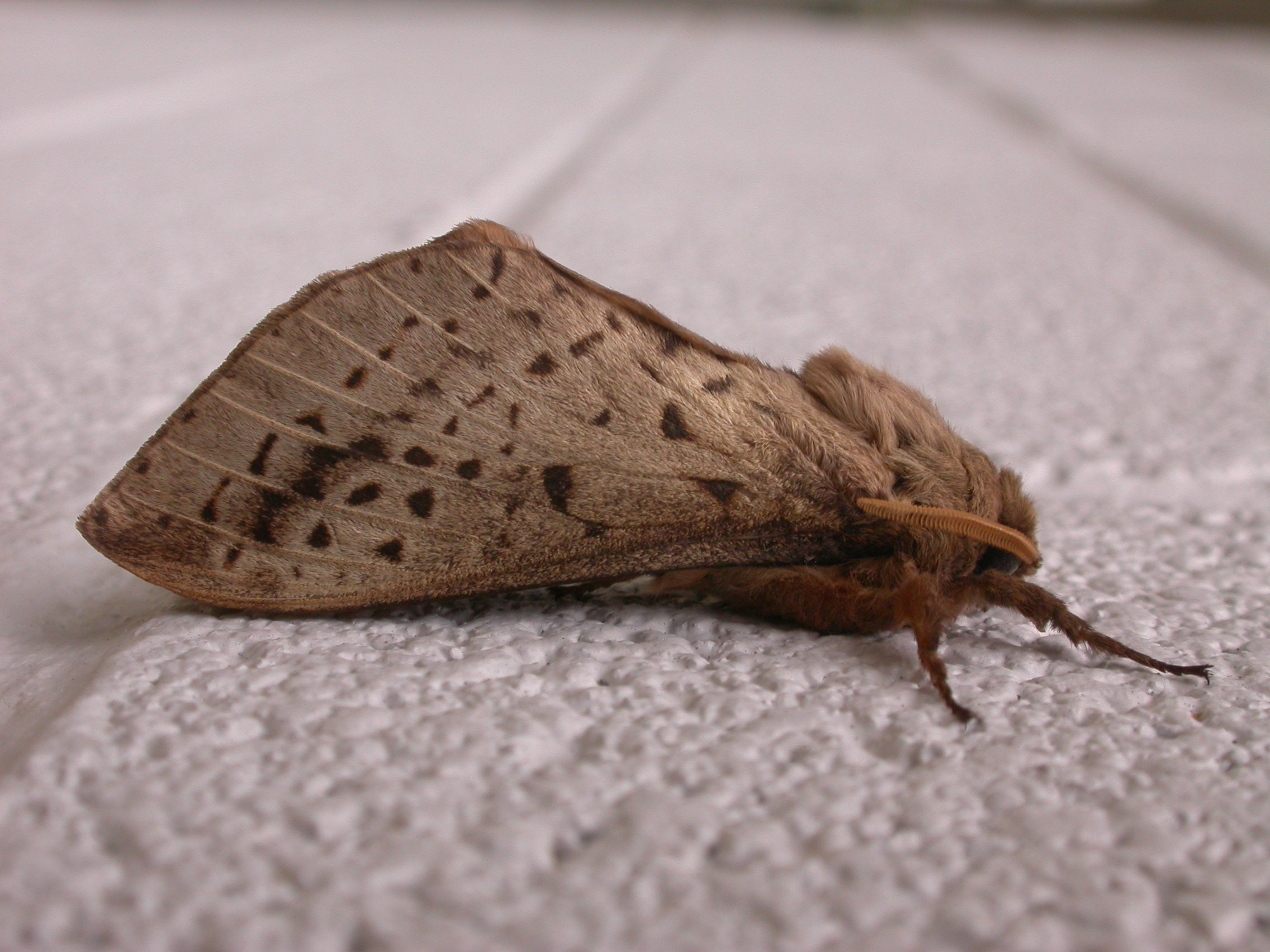

Scientific classification
- Kingdom: Animalia
- Phylum: Arthropoda
- Clade: Pancrustacea
- Class: Insecta
- Order: Lepidoptera
- Family: Hepialidae
- Genus: Oxycanus
- Species: O. dirempta

Binomial name
- Oxycanus dirempta (Walker, 1865)

Synonyms
- Porina dirempta Walker, 1865; Porina kershawi Lucas, 1891

= Oxycanus dirempta =

Species of moth

Oxycanus dirempta is a moth of the family Hepialidae. It is found in New South Wales and Victoria.

The wingspan is about 60 mm.
