= Oncopera brachyphylla =

Scientific classification
- Domain: Eukaryota
- Kingdom: Animalia
- Phylum: Arthropoda
- Class: Insecta
- Order: Lepidoptera
- Family: Hepialidae
- Genus: Oncopera
- Species: O. brachyphylla

Binomial name
- Oncopera brachyphylla Turner, 1925

Species of moth

Oncopera brachyphylla is a moth of the family Hepialidae. It is found in Queensland, Australia.

The larvae are subterranean and feed on the roots and bases of grasses and leaves in sown pastures.
