= Oxycanus stellans =

Scientific classification
- Kingdom: Animalia
- Phylum: Arthropoda
- Clade: Pancrustacea
- Class: Insecta
- Order: Lepidoptera
- Family: Hepialidae
- Genus: Oxycanus
- Species: O. stellans

Binomial name
- Oxycanus stellans Tindale, 1935

Species of moth

Oxycanus stellans is a moth of the family Hepialidae. It is found in Victoria, Australia.

The larvae possibly feed on Acacia species.
