= Oxycanus buluwandji =

Scientific classification
- Kingdom: Animalia
- Phylum: Arthropoda
- Clade: Pancrustacea
- Class: Insecta
- Order: Lepidoptera
- Family: Hepialidae
- Genus: Oxycanus
- Species: O. buluwandji

Binomial name
- Oxycanus buluwandji Tindale, 1964

Species of moth

Oxycanus buluwandji is a moth of the family Hepialidae. It is found in Queensland.
