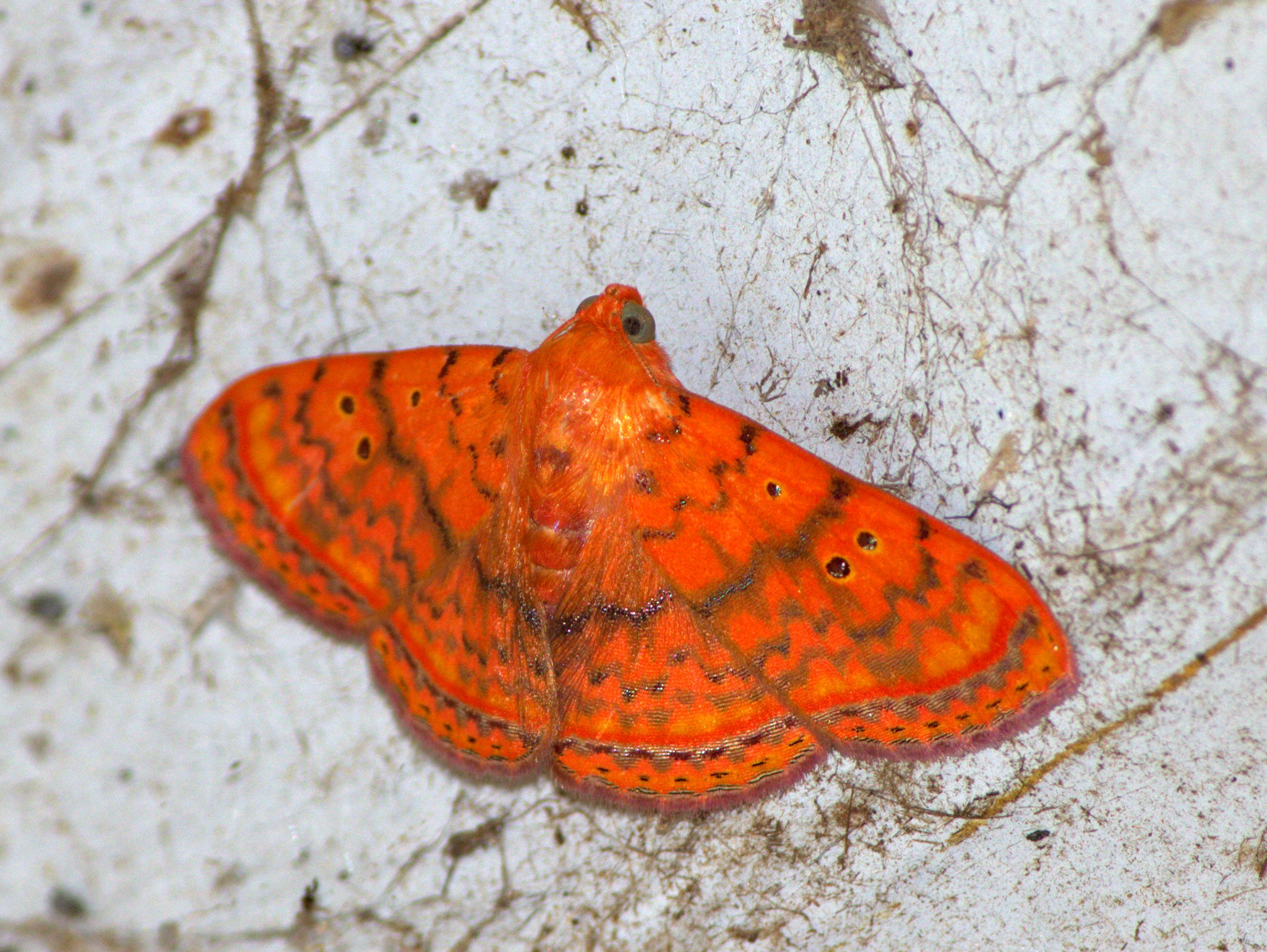

Scientific classification
- Domain: Eukaryota
- Kingdom: Animalia
- Phylum: Arthropoda
- Class: Insecta
- Order: Lepidoptera
- Superfamily: Noctuoidea
- Family: Erebidae
- Genus: Homodes
- Species: H. crocea

Binomial name
- Homodes crocea Guenée, 1852

= Homodes crocea =

Species of moth

Homodes crocea is a species from the genus Homodes. This species was originally described by Achille Guenée in 1852.
