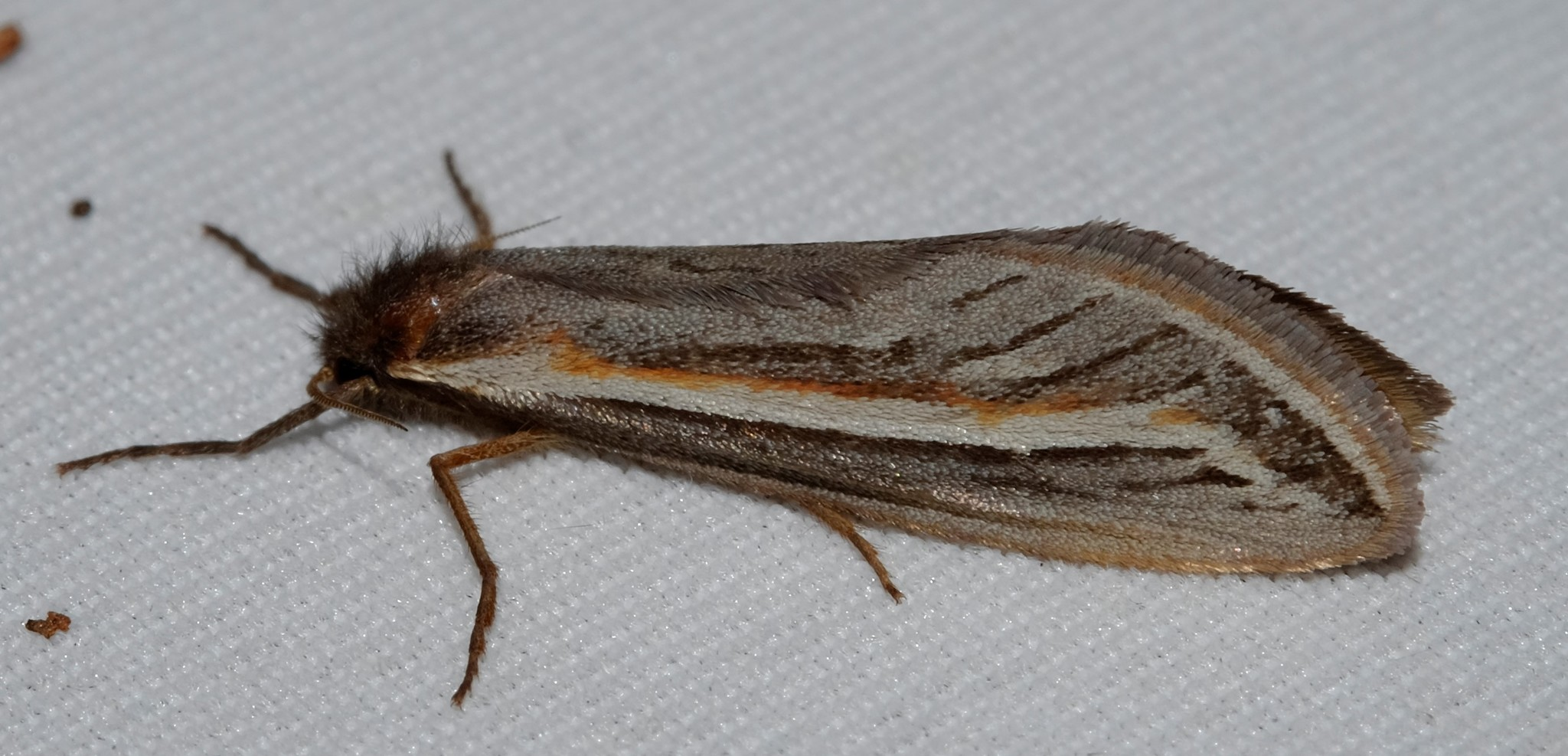

Scientific classification
- Kingdom: Animalia
- Phylum: Arthropoda
- Class: Insecta
- Order: Lepidoptera
- Family: Hepialidae
- Genus: Fraus
- Species: F. bilineata

Binomial name
- Fraus bilineata Walker, 1865

Synonyms
- Hectomanes compsenta Lower, 1892

= Fraus bilineata =

Species of moth

Fraus bilineata is a species of moth in the family Hepialidae. It is endemic to southern Australia (South Australia, Tasmania and Victoria).

The wingspan is 25–30 mm for males. Adults are on wing from late March to late April.
