= Oncopera parva =

Scientific classification
- Domain: Eukaryota
- Kingdom: Animalia
- Phylum: Arthropoda
- Class: Insecta
- Order: Lepidoptera
- Family: Hepialidae
- Genus: Oncopera
- Species: O. parva

Binomial name
- Oncopera parva Tindale, 1933

Synonyms
- Oncopera argentata Tindale, 1933

Species of moth

Oncopera parva is a moth of the family Hepialidae. It is endemic to Queensland.

The larvae are subterranean, but emerge from the soil to feed. They probably feed on fallen leaves.
