= Oxycanus nuptialis =

Scientific classification
- Kingdom: Animalia
- Phylum: Arthropoda
- Clade: Pancrustacea
- Class: Insecta
- Order: Lepidoptera
- Family: Hepialidae
- Genus: Oxycanus
- Species: O. nuptialis

Binomial name
- Oxycanus nuptialis Tindale, 1935

Species of moth

Oxycanus nuptialis is a moth of the family Hepialidae. It is found in New South Wales.

== Description ==
Moths of this species have grey-brown wings with vague, irregular spotting on the forewings. The thorax is lined with fine orange hairs. The wingspan of O. nuptialis is approximately 6 cm.
