= Oncopera tindalei =

Scientific classification
- Domain: Eukaryota
- Kingdom: Animalia
- Phylum: Arthropoda
- Class: Insecta
- Order: Lepidoptera
- Family: Hepialidae
- Genus: Oncopera
- Species: O. tindalei

Binomial name
- Oncopera tindalei Common, 1966

Species of moth

Oncopera tindalei is a moth of the family Hepialidae. It is found in New South Wales, Australia. It was named after Australian entomologist Norman Tindale.

The larvae are subterranean and probably feed on the roots and bases of grasses in native and sown pastures.
