= Fraus crocea =

Scientific classification
- Domain: Eukaryota
- Kingdom: Animalia
- Phylum: Arthropoda
- Class: Insecta
- Order: Lepidoptera
- Family: Hepialidae
- Genus: Fraus
- Species: F. crocea

Binomial name
- Fraus crocea (Lucas, 1891)

Synonyms
- Hectomanes crocea Lucas, 1891

Species of moth

Fraus crocea is a moth of the family Hepialidae. It is endemic to New South Wales, Queensland and Victoria.

The wingspan is about 20 mm for males and about 35 mm for females. Adults are on wing from February to May.

Larvae are associated with Imperata cylindrica and Gahnia species.
