= Ebbe Nielsen =

Ebbe Schmidt Nielsen (7 June 1950 – 7 March 2001) was a Danish entomologist influential in systematics and Lepidoptera research, and an early proponent of biodiversity informatics. The journal Invertebrate Systematics was established with significant contributions from Nielsen, and he assisted in the founding of the Global Biodiversity Information Facility (GBIF). Nielsen wrote several books, published over eighty scientific papers, and was highly regarded within the scientific community. Following his death, the GBIF organised the Ebbe Nielsen Prize in his memory, awarded annually to promising researchers in the field of biodiversity informatics. The moth Pollanisus nielseni is named after Nielsen.

== Early life and education ==
Nielsen was born on 7 June 1950 in Ry, Denmark. His parents were farmers, and he and his brother frequently explored the surrounding Jutland countryside, playing in forests and by the shores of Mossø, a lake near their home. Inspired by reading about collecting and identifying moths and butterflies, Nielsen began gathering specimens at the age of fourteen and later joined an entomology club based in Århus.

Nielsen attended Aarhus University while working part-time for a local museum. Following graduation, he was solicited to join a project on the ecosystem of Danish beech forests, which the museum had been involved in. With this appointment, Nielsen began his masters research, collecting numerous specimens as part of the project and studying their phenology and distribution, gaining his MSc in zoology in 1976.

== Career ==
Following writing a volume on the moth family Elachistidae and working on the checklist of Danish Lepidoptera, Nielsen was invited through the University of Copenhagen to participate in a six-month expedition to South America. The trip commenced in 1978 and focused on extensive biodiversity surveys of the Patagonia region. Nielsen managed much of the expedition and was involved with it for the whole of the period, one of only two of the original fifteen scientists to see the project through to completion. The experience provided him with considerable material for his PhD and he developed an appreciation for the fauna of the southern hemisphere, where he would live for the next two decades.

Nielsen acquired his PhD from the University of Copenhagen in 1980. A year later, he was engaged by the Commonwealth Scientific and Industrial Research Organisation (CSIRO) to work in Australia on primitive Lepidoptera and other Lepidoptera inventories. He focused less on pure research after 1990, when he was appointed director of the Australian National Insect Collection in Canberra. He was instrumental in the establishment of CSIRO Publishing in 1996, and in particular the journal Invertebrate Taxonomy (known as Invertebrate Systematics since the beginning of 2002). He chaired the editorial committee for the journal and was a frequent contributor.

Nielsen enthusiastically advocated for a comprehensive repository of data on species and their characteristics, recognising informatics as a key to understanding and managing biodiversity. During the 1990s, he and other scientists pushed for an extensive global biodiversity resource, designed to utilise up-to-date informatics software and capable of collating data held on various separate databases. In 1999, the Organisation for Economic Co-operation and Development endorsed a proposal for the establishment of 'a global biodiversity information facility', and on 1 March 2001, the Global Biodiversity Information Facility was officially launched. As Australia's Head of Delegation for the GBIF and a founding member, Nielsen was en route to Montreal to attend the first meeting of the governing board when he died of a heart attack.

The Karl Jordan Medal for lepidopterology was awarded to Nielsen by the Lepidopterist' Society in 1990, and he was later a member of the award committee. That same year he was the recipient of the David Rivett Medal from the Australian Academy of Science, and in 1992 of the Ian Mackerras Medal, awarded to him by the Australian Entomological Society. Nielsen was a member of several committees, societies, and advisory boards, was a Foreign Associate of the United States National Academy of Sciences, and a Foreign Fellow of the Royal Danish Academy of Sciences and Letters.

Nielsen was the author or co-author of eight books and monographs, and was editor or co-editor of many more. He also wrote over eighty other published pieces, mostly research and academic papers. The majority of his publications were on the topics of systematics, Lepidoptera, biological inventories, biodiversity, and informatics.

== Death and legacy ==
Nielsen died in his sleep of a heart attack on 7 March 2001. He was in California for a conference while on his way to Montreal from Australia to attend the inaugural session of the governing board for the newly established GBIF, a project with which he had been significantly involved. A few days after his death, during the meeting Nielsen had been due to participate in, the GBIF Ebbe Nielsen Prize was created to honour his memory. The annual prize recognized a researcher who had made substantial contributions to biodiversity informatics. In 2015, GBIF revamped the award as an incentive competition, now known as the GBIF Ebbe Nielsen Challenge.

A special issue of Invertebrate Systematics was published in 2003 as a tribute to Nielsen, and contained articles written by his friends and colleagues about him and his work. In 1995, a new species of moth was discovered in Western Australia and in 2005 it was formally described by Gerhard M. Tarmann. The moth, of the genus Pollanisus, was given the specific epithet nielseni by Tarmann, in memory of his colleague's extensive work in lepidopterology.

== See also ==
- Category:Taxa named by Ebbe Nielsen
