= Thitarodes =

Scientific classification
- Kingdom: Animalia
- Phylum: Arthropoda
- Clade: Pancrustacea
- Class: Insecta
- Order: Lepidoptera
- Family: Hepialidae
- Genus: Thitarodes; Viette, 1968

Type species
- Hepialus armoricanus Oberthür, 1909

Species
- See text

Synonyms
- Forkalus Chu and Wang, 1985 Parahepialus Zou & Zhang, 2010 Ahamus Zou & Zhang, 2010

Genus of moths

Thitarodes is a genus of moths of the family Hepialidae. In English Thitarodes is known as "ghost moth". They are found in eastern Asia. The majority are restricted to the Tibetan Plateau. Often in Chinese entomological nomenclature Thitarodes is still referred to as Hepialus, although the name was changed back in 1968. Furthermore, some authors use incorrectly the term "bat moth" which is a bad translation of the Chinese term for ghost moth.

Many larvae of this genus are the hosts to the parasitic fungus Ophiocordyceps sinensis. The fungus-insect complex known as caterpillar fungus, or by its original Tibetan name yartsa gunbu (or its Nepali pidgin version yarsa gumba). It was first used in traditional Tibetan medicine, but is now highly prized by practitioners of traditional Chinese medicine who know it as dong chong xiacao or short chong cao.

== Species ==
- Thitarodes albipictus – China (Yunnan)
- Thitarodes arizanus – Taiwan
- Thitarodes armoricanus – China (Tibet Autonomous Region)
- Thitarodes baimaensis – China (Yunnan)
- Thitarodes baqingensis – China (Tibet AR)
- Thitarodes bibelteus
- Thitarodes biruensis
- Thitarodes caligophilus
- Thitarodes callinivalis – China (Yunnan)
- Thitarodes cingulatus – China (Gansu)
- Thitarodes damxungensis – China (Tibet AR)
- Thitarodes danieli – Nepal
- Thitarodes deqinensis
- Thitarodes dierli – Nepal
- Thitarodes dinggyeensis
- Thitarodes dongyuensis – China
- Thitarodes eberti – Nepal
- Thitarodes ferrugineus – China (Yunnan)
- Thitarodes gonggaensis – China (Sichuan)
- Thitarodes hainanensis
- Thitarodes jiachaensis
- Thitarodes jialangensis – China (Tibet AR)
- Thitarodes jinshaensis – China (Yunnan)
- Thitarodes kangdingensis – China (Sichuan)
- Thitarodes kangdingroides – China (Kangding area, Sichuan)
- Thitarodes latitegumenus
- Thitarodes litangensis – China (Sichuan)
- Thitarodes malaisei – Myanmar
- Thitarodes markamensis – China (Tibet AR)
- Thitarodes meiliensis – China (Yunnan)
- Thitarodes namensis
- Thitarodes namlinensis
- Thitarodes namnai
- Thitarodes nipponensis – Japan
- Thitarodes oblifurcus – China (Qinghai)
- Thitarodes pratensis – China (Yunnan)
- Thitarodes pui
- Thitarodes renzhiensis – China (Yunnan)
- Thitarodes richthofeni – China
- Thitarodes sejilaensis
- Thitarodes sinarabesca – China
- Thitarodes shambalaensis – China (Sichuan)
- Thitarodes varians – China (Tibet AR)
- Thitarodes variabilis – Far east of Russia
- Thitarodes varius – Far east of Russia
- Thitarodes xizangensis – China (Tibet AR)
- Thitarodes xunhuaensis – China (Qinghai)
- Thitarodes yadongensis
- Thitarodes yeriensis – China (Yunnan)
- Thitarodes yongshengensis
- Thitarodes zaliensis – China (Tibet AR)
- Thitarodes zhangmoensis – China (Xinjiang)
- Thitarodes zhongzhiensis – China (Yunnan)

== Former species ==
- Thitarodes anomopterus – China (Yunnan)
- Thitarodes jianchuanensis – China (Yunnan)
- Thitarodes lijiangensis – China (Yunnan)
- Thitarodes luquensis – China (Gansu)
- Thitarodes menyuanicus – China (Qinghai)
- Thitarodes nebulosus – China (Tibet AR)
- Thitarodes sichuanus – China (Yunnan)
- Thitarodes yulongensis – China (Yunnan)
- Thitarodes yunlongensis – China (Yunnan)
- Thitarodes yunnanensis – China (Yunnan)
- Thitarodes zhayuensis – China (Tibet AR)
