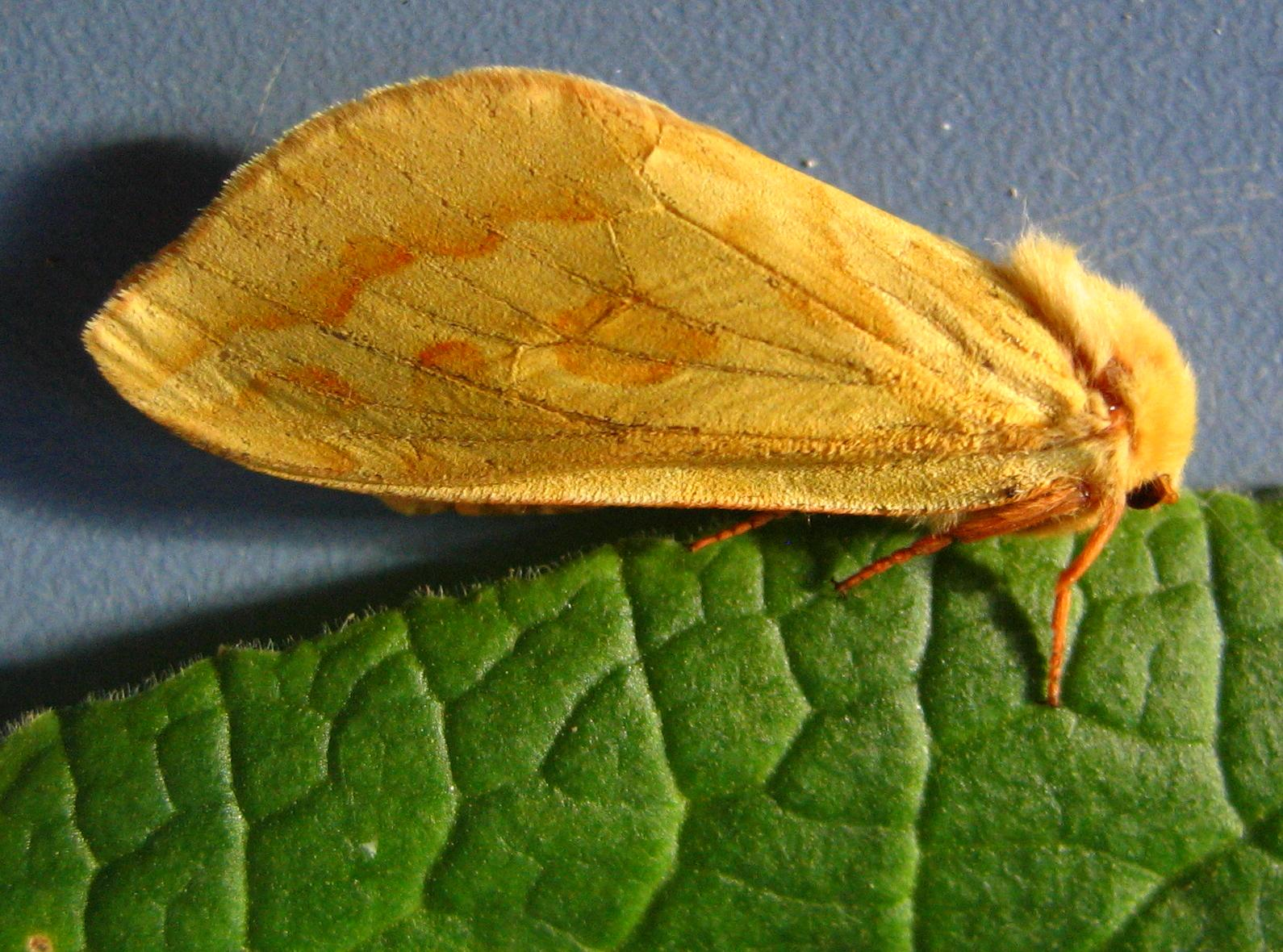
- Female
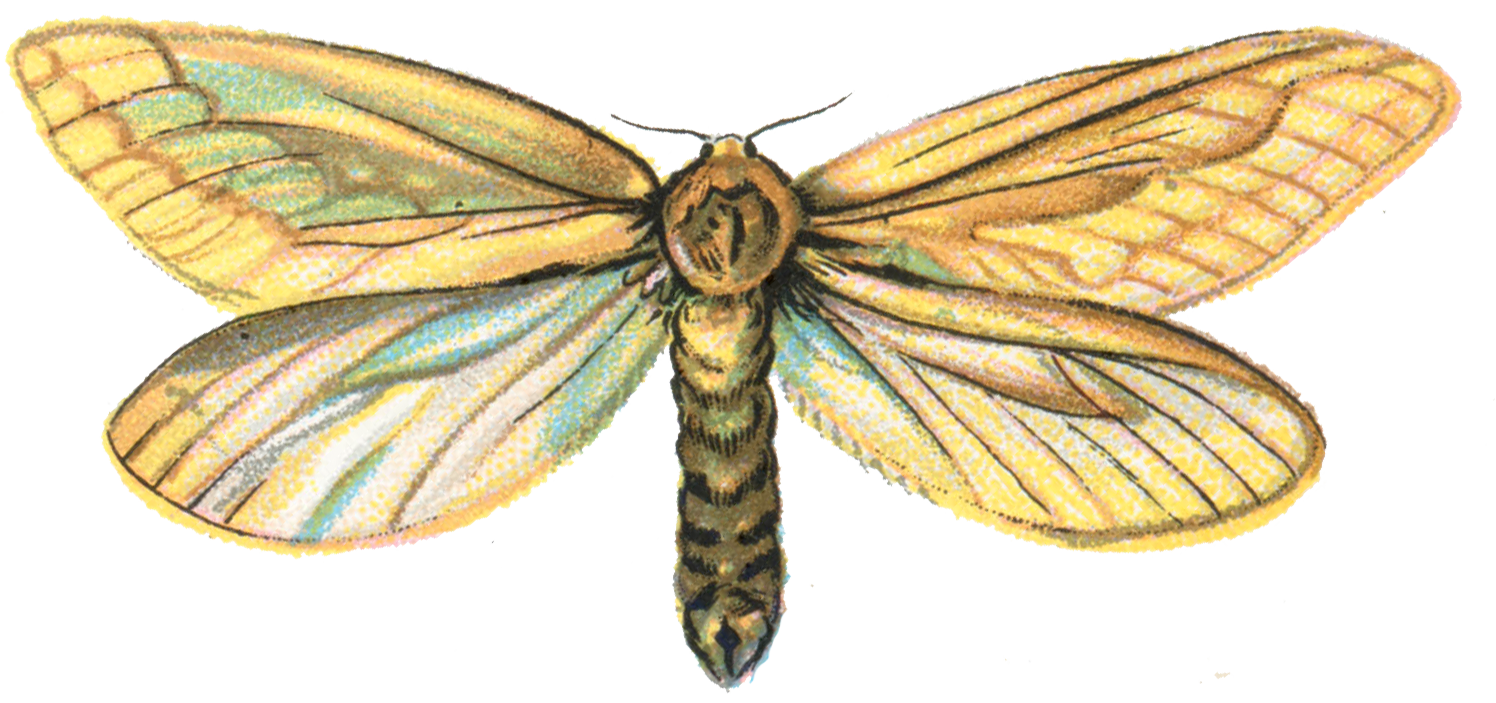

Scientific classification
- Kingdom: Animalia
- Phylum: Arthropoda
- Class: Insecta
- Order: Lepidoptera
- Family: Hepialidae
- Genus: Hepialus; Fabricius, 1775
- Species: H. humuli

Binomial name
- Hepialus humuli (Linnaeus, 1758)

Synonyms
- List: Genus: Hepiolus Illiger, 1801; Epialus Agassiz, 1847; Epiolus Agassiz, 1847; Tephus Wallengren, 1869 Species: Noctua humuli Linnaeus, 1758; Hepialus thulensis Newman, 1865; Hepialus humulator Haworth, 1802; Hepialus hethlandica Staudinger, 1871; Hepialus rosea Petersen, 1902; Hepialus albida Spuler, 1910; Hepialus azuga Pfitzner, 1912; Hepialus grandis Pfitzner, 1912; Hepialus dannenbergi Stephan, 1923; Hepialus pusillus Stephan, 1923; Hepialus rufomaculata Lempke, 1938; Hepialus albida Bytinski-Salz, 1939; Hepialus roseoornata Bytinski-Salz, 1939; Hepialus uniformis Bytinski-Salz, 1939; Hepialus faeroensis Dahl, 1954; Hepialus fumosa Cockayne, 1955; Hepialus radiata Cockayne, 1955; Hepialus postnigrescens Lempke, 1961; Hepialus postrufescens Lempke, 1961; Hepialus griseomaculata van Wisselingh, 1965; Hepialus thuleus

= Ghost moth =

Species of moth

The ghost moth or ghost swift (Hepialus humuli) is a moth of the family Hepialidae. It is common throughout Europe, except for the far south-east.

Female ghost moths are larger than males, and exhibit sexual dimorphism with their differences in size and wing color. The adults fly from June to August and are attracted to light. The species overwinters as a larva. The larva is whitish and maggot-like and feeds underground on the roots of a variety of wild and cultivated plants (see list below). The species can be an economically significant pest in forest nurseries.

The term ghost moth is sometimes used as a general term for all hepialids. The ghost moth gets its name from the hovering display flight of the male, sometimes slowly rising and falling, over open ground to attract females. In a suitable location, several males may display together in a lek.

== Physiology and description ==
Female ghost moths have a wingspan of 50–70 mm. They have yellowish-buff forewings with darker linear markings and brown hindwings. Males are smaller, with a wingspan of 46–50 mm, and typically have white or silver wings. However, in H. h. thulensis, found in Shetland and the Faroe Islands, there are buff-coloured individuals.

== Mating ==
=== Male/male interactions ===
==== Lekking ====
The ghost swift aggregates in leks in order to attract female mates. Lekking occurs at dusk and typically lasts for 20–30 minutes. During the lekking period, incident light intensities between 10.0 and 2.0 lux have been found to increase the brightness contrast between the background (grass/plants) and male moths' silver/white wings. It is thus believed that the male wing color may have evolved as a secondary adaptation to aid in the moth's visibility.

==== Displaying ====
The male ghost swifts display by hovering directly above vegetation, while occasionally shifting slowly horizontally. The displaying male only occasionally made vertical movements to shift display positions. Females are attracted to the displaying males in leks, and once a female chooses a male, she will pass within a few centimeters of him. The male will follow the female, who will land and beat her wings, signaling that the male may approach her. The two moths will then copulate.

=== Female/male interactions ===
==== Pheromones ====
Males perform a flight display and use both chemical and visual signals to attract females to their mating sites. While aggregating in leks, male ghost swifts use pheromones.. These are emitted in order to attract a female, but they are not known to be used as an aphrodisiac. The main component of the male pheromone (in the distantly related species Phymatopus hecta) is (E,E)-α-Farnesene.

The olfactory substances used to attract females are produced on the male's hind tibial brushes, and were said to be "goat-like", meaning the smell of the Goat Moth caterpillar. Males may also be attracted to stationary females by olfactory stimuli.

== Sexual dimorphism ==
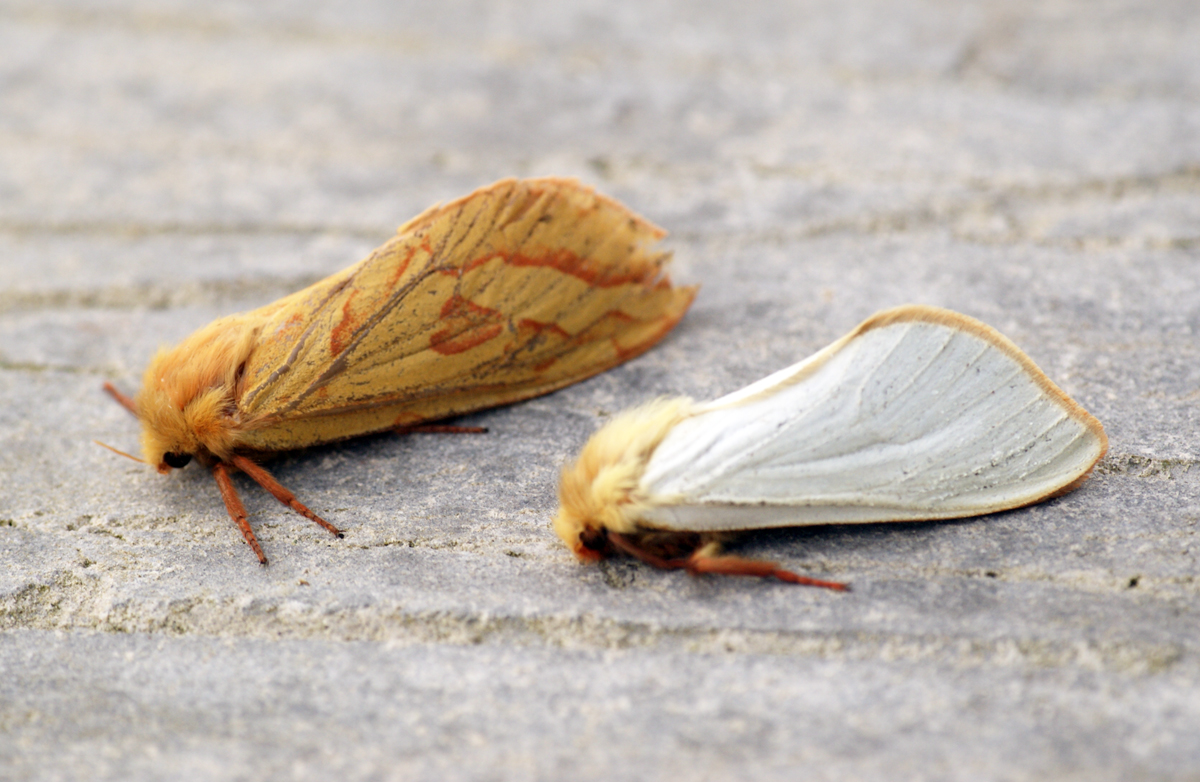
Female ghost moth (left) and male ghost moth (right)

The ghost moth displays high levels of sexual dichromatism (see picture right). Female ghost moths are a yellow-brownish color, while males have silver/white wings. It has been suggested that the difference in wing color between males and females is used for visual epidemic signaling. The upperside of males have unpigmented scales with elaborate morphology and meshwork that allow for light reflection and may aid in attracting females. The females lack the intricate morphology of the males. The underside of both the male and female ghost moth is a uniform grey/brown color. It is believed that there is behavioral dimorphism as well, with one study showing that females were more attracted to light than males.

== Predators ==
Common predators of ghost moths include several species of bats and birds. These predators are attracted to the moths during the male flight displays. Eptesicus nilssonii, the northern bat, has often been documented preying on lekking ghost moths. The ghost moth is a member of the family Hepialidae, an early branch of Lepidoptera. Species in the Hepialidae lack several predator defense systems, including ultrasonic hearing. The ghost moth lacks sophisticated predator defense systems and instead restricts its sexual behavior to a short period during dusk to reduce its predation risk. Despite these precautions, the moth is still at a large predation risk, especially at high latitudes where twilight is prolonged.

It is believed that the deaf moths, such as the family Hepialidae, predate the predatory bats that may have driven the evolution of ultrasonic hearing. It is currently believed that the ghost moth's restricted flight patterns and low flight positions may be their main form of anti-predator defense. The ghost moth displays for only 20–30 minutes at dusk, which aids in predator avoidance, as most bats typically do not start feeding until after dusk, and most birds stop feeding well in advance of sunset.

== Life history ==
=== Egg ===
On average, most female ghost moths will lay around 600 eggs over four days, but a female can lay anywhere from 200 to 1,600 eggs.

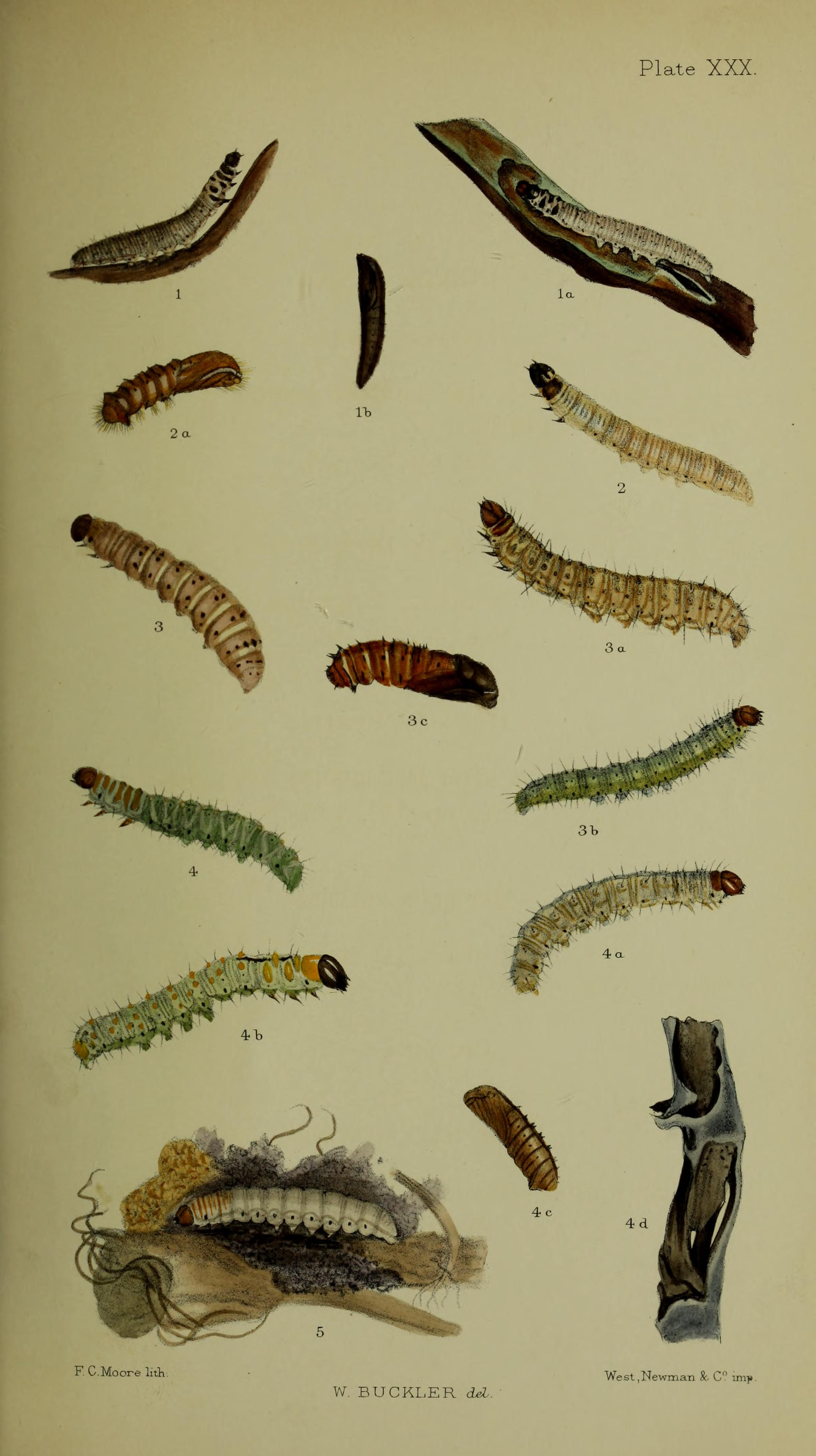
Figs. 3. 3a, 3b larvae after last moult 3c pupa

=== Larva ===
The ghost moth larvae grow up to 50 mm long and have a white opaque body with a red/brown head. Their prothoracic plate is also red/brown, and their pinacula is dark brown. The young larvae feed on plant rootlets, while the older larvae feed on larger roots, stolons, and the lower regions of plant stems. The larval growth is very slow, and the developmental period can last for two to three years. The larva have at least 12 instars, but further research is needed to see if there may be more instars during higher temperatures. The larva cause damage to the plants they consume, with damage being the worst during the second summer of the larva's growth period. The larvae typically feed in grasslands, lawns, and pastures and have been known to cause significant damage to the host species. In the British Isles, the ghost moth larvae live in the soil and can commonly be found underneath the grass.

=== Pupa ===
The ghost moth typically pupates during April or May after the two to three-year larval growth period has ended.

=== Adult ===
Adults are most commonly found in June and July, and they are typically active around dusk. In particular, lekking and mating occur at dusk.

== Damage to crops ==
Ghost moth larvae are polyphagous—they are able to feed on multiple types of plants. Larvae born on crops will typically feed on the roots and can cause significant damage to the crops. Ghost moths frequently cause damage to strawberries, lettuce, and chrysanthemum plants.

== Recorded food plants ==
- Arctium - burdock
- Asparagus
- Beta – beet
- Brassica
- Cannabis
- Chrysanthemum
- Dahlia
- Daucus – carrot
- Fagus – beech
- Fragaria – strawberry
- Fungi
- Helianthus – Jerusalem artichoke
- Humulus – hop
- Lactuca – lettuce
- Pastinaca – parsnip
- Phaseolus – bean
- Pisum – pea
- Poaceae – grasses
- Quercus – oak
- Rumex – dock/sorrel
- Solanum – potato
- Taraxacum officinale – dandelion
- Urtica – nettle

== Additional species which may be included in Hepialus ==
Chinese authors retain a number of species in Hepialus. Most of these are placed in the genus Thitarodes by others. Species retained in Hepialus include:

- Hepialus bibelteus F.R. Shen & Y.S. Zhou, 1997
- Hepialus biruensis S.Q. Fu, 2002
- Hepialus deqinensis X.C. Liang, 1988
- Hepialus haimaensis X.C. Liang, 1988
- Hepialus latitegumenus F.R. Shen & Y.S. Zhou, 1997
- Hepialus pui G.R. Zhang, D.X. Gu & X. Liu, 2007
- Hepialus xiaojinensis Y.Q. Tu, K.S. Ma & D.L. Zhang, 2009

== Etymology ==
Hepialus humuli was first described by the Swedish taxonomist, Carl Linnaeus, in 1758. He named it Phalaena Noctua humuli — implying night moth of the hop vine. It was later allocated to the genus Hepialus (a fever), which was raised by Johan Christian Fabricius in 1775 and refers to its ″fitful, alternating flight″. The specific name humuli refers to the genus of hops (Humulus), on which Linnaeus wrongly thought the larvae fed on its roots.

=== Subspecies ===
- Hepialus humuli humuli
- Hepialus humuli thulensis Newman, 1865 (Great Britain, Faroe Islands)

=== Ghost moth in folklore ===
It is believed that the common name of "ghost moth" for Hepialus humuli may have originated from European folklore, as there are numerous references to white moths being the souls of the departed. It is believed that the ghost moth is also referenced in the last passage of Wuthering Heights by Emily Brontë.

== Gallery ==
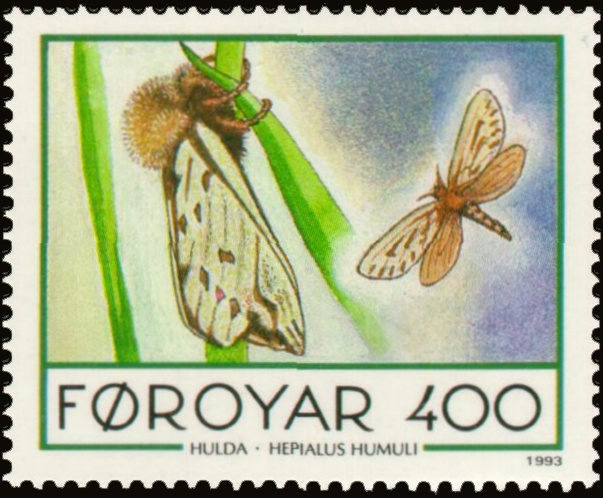
Ghost moth on a Faroese stamp

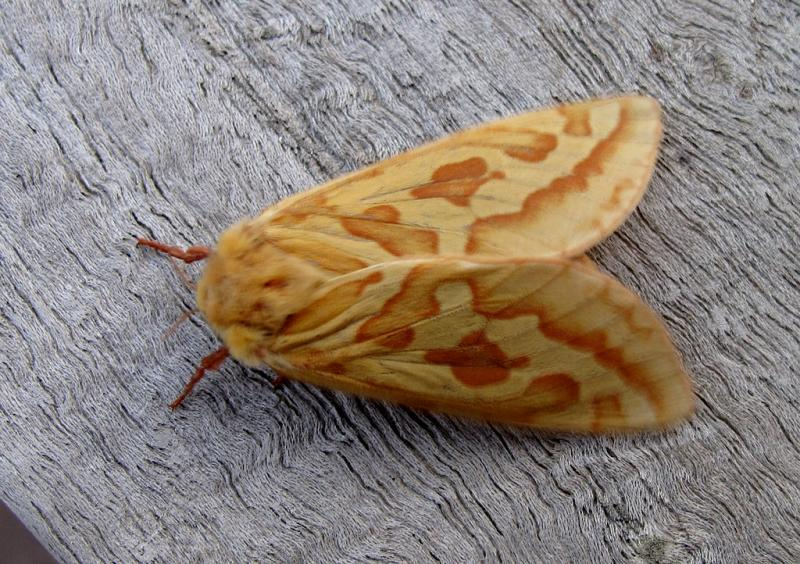
Female

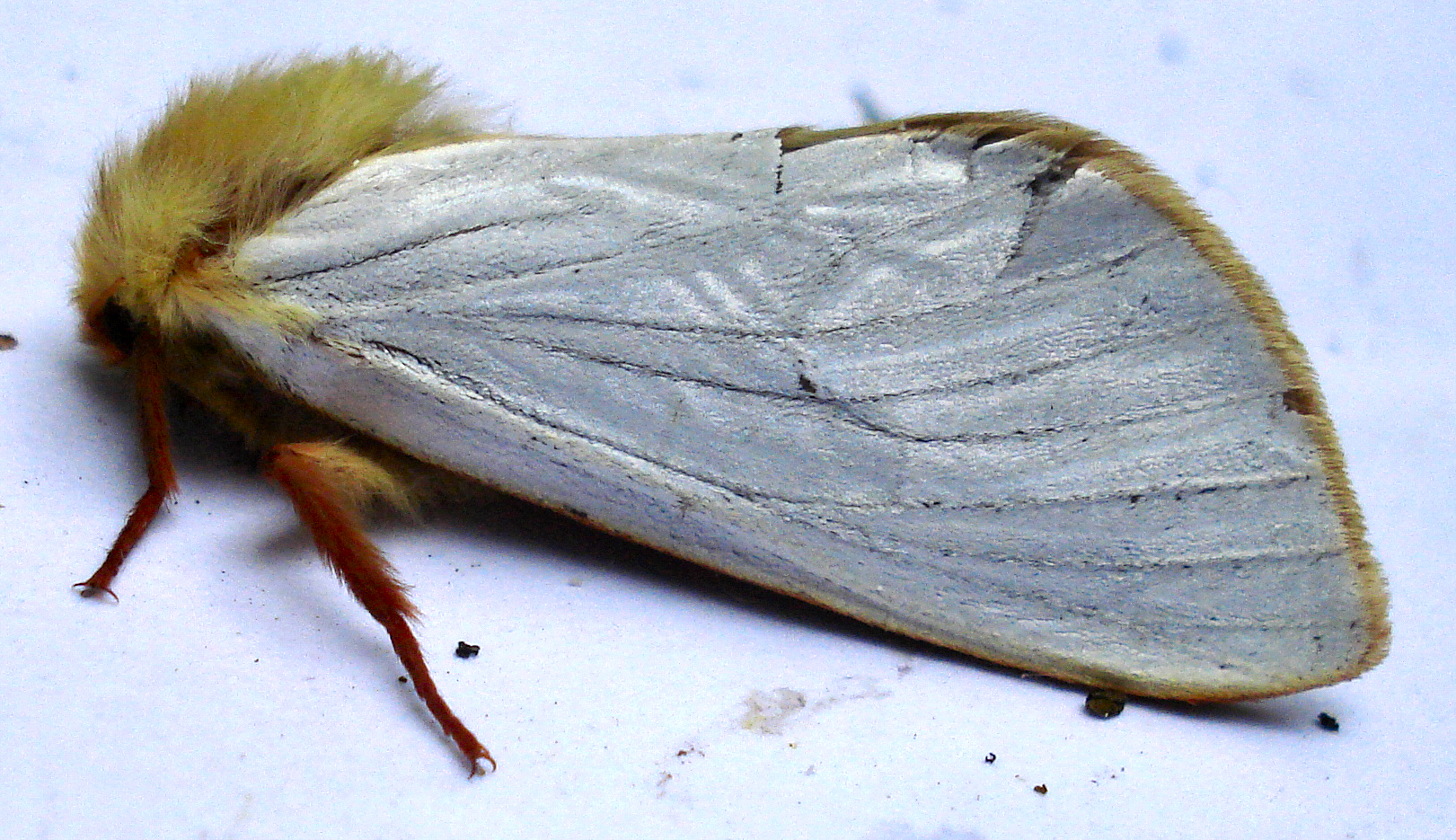
Male

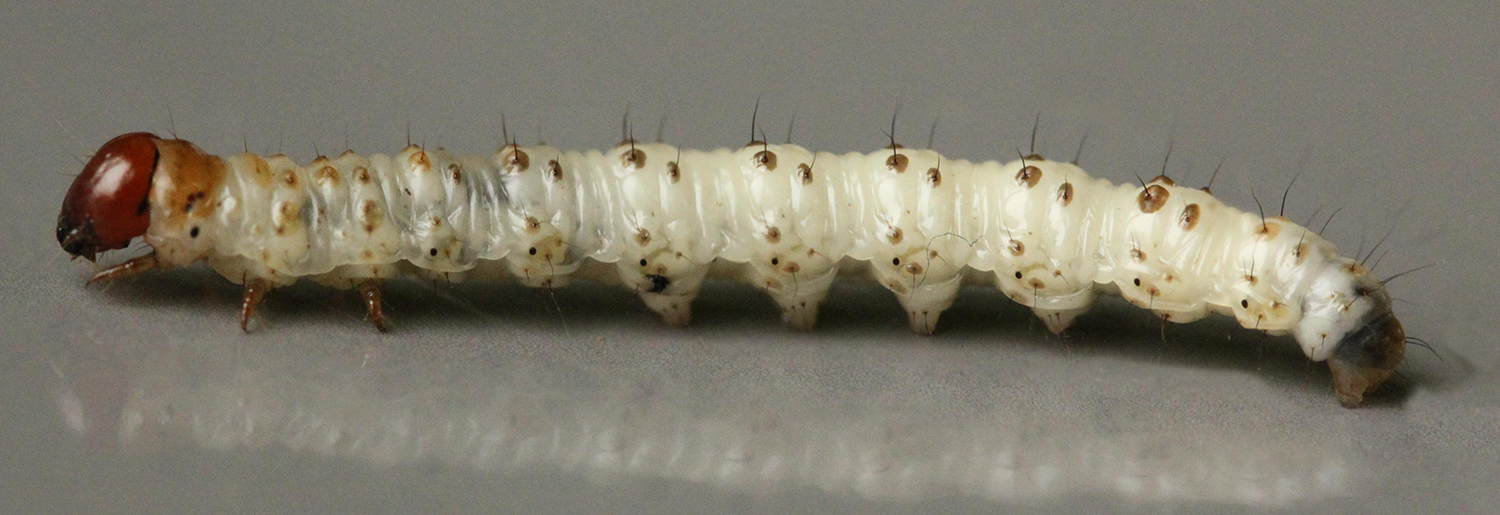
Larva
