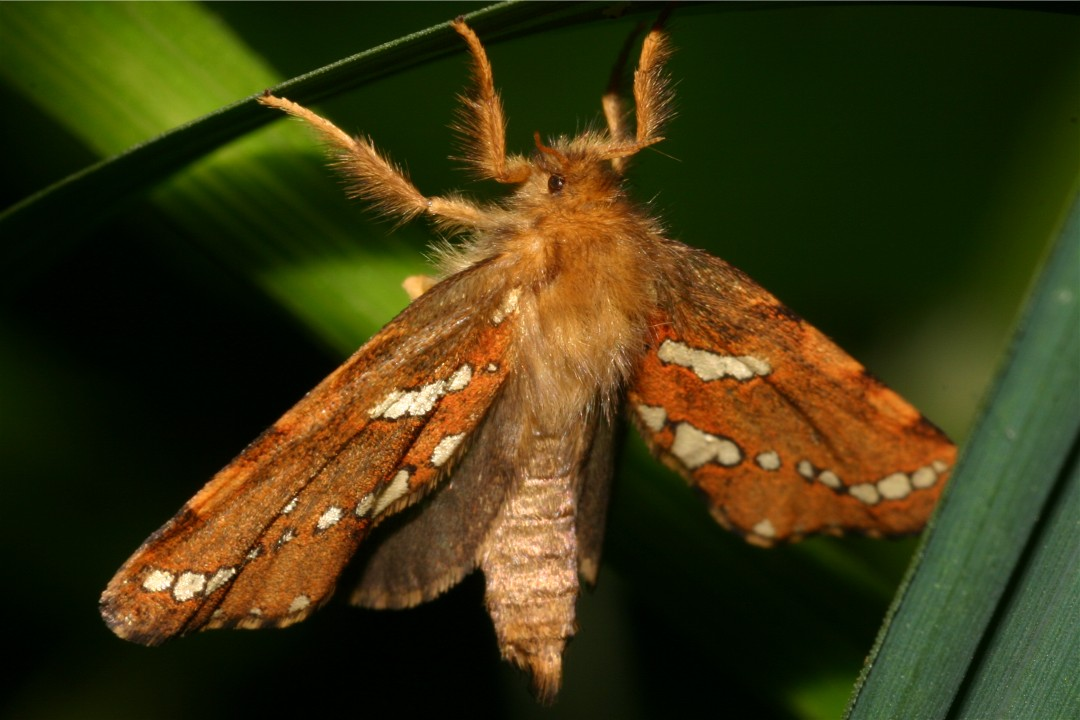
- Phymatopus hecta

Scientific classification
- Domain: Eukaryota
- Kingdom: Animalia
- Phylum: Arthropoda
- Class: Insecta
- Order: Lepidoptera
- Family: Hepialidae
- Genus: Phymatopus; Wallengren, 1869 or auctt. nec Wallengren, 1869

Synonyms
- Hepiolopsis Borner, 1920; Phimatopus

= Phymatopus =

Genus of moths

Phymatopus (originally: Phalaena Noctua Linnaeus, 1758) is a genus of moths of the family Hepialidae (commonly referred to as swift moths or ghost moths), which consists of around 700 species and 82 genera. The genus was erected by Hans Daniel Johan Wallengren in 1869. They can be found across Eurasia and North America. Species can be distinguished by the different morphology of male genitalia and different forewing patterns, which vary in stripe colour and size and arrangement of spots. The stripes themselves consist of spots separated by dark veins which are fringed by thin black lines from both inner and outer sides.

== Species ==
- Phymatopus hecta (gold swift) - Europe

- Food plant: Pteridium, but many others are named in the European literature

- Phymatopus japonicus - Japan

- Food plant: Pteridium

- Phymatopus hectica - eastern Russia

Phymatopus auctt. nec Wallengren, 1869

- Phymatopus behrensii - United States

- Recorded food plants: Helenium, Lupinus, Malus, various ferns

- Phymatopus californicus - United States

- Recorded food plants: Baccharis, Eriophyllum

- Phymatopus hectoides - United States

- Recorded food plants: Baccharis, Horkelia, Scrophularia

== Description ==
The genus Phymatopus is considered monotypic and species can be distinguished by forewing pattern and male genitalia. Phymatopus lack spurs on the tibiae and like other members of the Hepialidae, also lack a proboscis or frenulum and have very short antennae.

=== Gold swift ===
The gold swift (Phymatopus hectus), originally belonging to the genus Hepialus, is widely distributed across Europe (central and northern) and the Ural Mountains, follows the distribution of its food plant - bracken and roots of Erica, Primula, Rumex, Calluna. The male forewings bear two silvery white stripes consisting of individual spots separated by dark veins, which are fringed with thin black lines. The dorsal process of valvella (part of male genitalia) is almost straight, and the mesosome tip is rounded.

=== Phymatopus hecta japonicus ===
Phymatopus hecta japonicus is found located in the Russian Far East: Sakhalin island and southern Kurils; south of the Daisetsu mountains, Hokkaido, Japan. Its appearance is similar to P. hectus but differs in that the outer strip is usually uninterrupted. It consists of four or five silvery spots at the apex (anterior corner), two or three small spots moving slightly more inward and the largest one at the inner margin. The morphology of the male genitalia is also different from that of P. hectus, the ventral process of valvella is belt like, which tapers to a point as it reaches the distal quarter, the dorsal margin of valva is convex. P. japonicus from Sakhalin has a maximum male wingspan of 25–26 mm and shows pale or greyish brown colouring on the forewings, whereas the male specimens from Kurilan tend to have a larger wingspan of 30–31 mm, bright, reddish brown. The male genitalia also differs between specimens of Kurilian population and from Sakhalin, with Kurilian males having shorter mesosomes and a rounded tip of valva distal projection, as opposed to a tapering tip in Sakhalin males.

=== Phymatopus hecticus ===
Phymatopus hecticus is found in eastern Russia. The forewing stripes are usually composed of golden-yellow or whitish coloured confluent spots without metallic lustre. In male genitalia, the dorsal process of valvella is strongly curved in the distal part, giving it a hook-like appearance; there is also a clear cavity at the tip of the mesosome.

=== Phymatopus hecticus albomaculatus ===
Phymatopus hecticus albomaculatus is found in eastern Russia, north of Primorskii krai. Both forewing stripes have a silvery-white appearance, with a metallic tinge, similar to Phymatopus hectus and Phymatopus haponicus, also consisting of separated spots. However, they have differences in male genitalia; the shape of the eighth abdominal sternum and tip of mesosome. The length of forewing is about 14 mm in males, with a curved inner strip. The outer strip consists of three separated spots at the apex and two smaller spots moving inwards.

== Range ==
Western Asia, North America - north of Mexico, central and northern Europe. The Eurasian range consists solely of Phymatopus hectus, and in North America the genus is represented by three species, which are geographically restricted to the western coastal region of the United States.

== Life cycle ==
=== Larva ===
Phymatopus are root and stem borers. It is not uncommon for the larvae to tunnel through the stems, as is the case of the western North American Phymatopus. Tunnels can be found travelling through the base of the stems and also the adjacent stems in contact with leaf litter and soil. Sometimes dead stems can also serve to provide tunnels which are active. As well as tunnelling through stems, some larvae (e.g. P. hectoides) tunnel through the soil and feed on root tissues.

=== Pupa ===
In the pupae, one or two fixed basal abdominal segments. On the abdominal segments, there are dorsal spines aligned in rows, similar to some lower members of the Heteroneura.

== Meiosis ==
As in other lepidopterans, early prophase I stage of meiosis occurs as normal, but there is no crossing over or chiasma formation in the females at the prophase I stage. The males on the other hand show conventional meiotic recombination.

== Mating ==
In many hepialids, the female releases attractants to draw in males. This is the ancestral condition whereas in Phymatopus, the opposite occurs, with males attracting females. See also Gold swift

== Host plants and food plants ==
Host plant:

- Pteridium (bracken)

Food plants:

- Brooms (Baccharis)
- Horkelia
- Figworts (Scrophularia)
- Woolly sunflower (Eriophyllum)
- Sneezeweed (Helenium)
- Lupins/ lupines (Lupinus)
- Apple trees (Malus)

- Roots of:

- Erica (heaths)
- Primula
- Docks and sorrels (Rumex)
- Common heather / ling (Calluna)

== Mobility ==
Mobility is defined as the ability to migrate. According to the metapopulation theory, migration is important for individuals to colonize new areas and recolonize old ones to avoid extinction. Moths, like other insects, are only mobile in the larval and adult stages. Mobility at the larval stage is limited and required mainly to find food and an optimal environment to pupate. According to van der Meulen and Groenendijk's classification, Phymatopus exhibit area restricted, limited wandering behaviour and small flight range.
