= Ahamus =

Scientific classification
- Kingdom: Animalia
- Phylum: Arthropoda
- Clade: Pancrustacea
- Class: Insecta
- Order: Lepidoptera
- Family: Hepialidae
- Genus: Ahamus; Z.W. Zou & G.R. Zhang, 2010

Species
- See text.

Genus of moths

Ahamus is a genus of moths of the family Hepialidae.

== Species ==
- Ahamus altaicola
- Ahamus alticola (disputed)
- Ahamus anomopterus
- Ahamus carna (disputed)
- Ahamus gangcaensis
- Ahamus jianchuanensis
- Ahamus lijiangensis
- Ahamus luquensis
- Ahamus macilentus
- Ahamus maquensis
- Ahamus menyuanicus
- Ahamus sichuanus
- Ahamus yulongensis
- Ahamus yunlongensis
- Ahamus yunnanensis
- Ahamus yushuensis
- Ahamus zadoiensis
- Ahamus zhayuensis
