= Thitarodes damxungensis =

Scientific classification
- Domain: Eukaryota
- Kingdom: Animalia
- Phylum: Arthropoda
- Class: Insecta
- Order: Lepidoptera
- Family: Hepialidae
- Genus: Thitarodes
- Species: T. damxungensis

Binomial name
- Thitarodes damxungensis (D.R. Yang, 1995)

Synonyms
- Hepialus damxungensis D.R. Yang, 1995

Species of moth

Thitarodes damxungensis is a species of moth of the family Hepialidae. It was described by D.R. Yang in 1995, and is known from the Tibet Autonomous Region in China.
