= Thitarodes xizangensis =

Scientific classification
- Domain: Eukaryota
- Kingdom: Animalia
- Phylum: Arthropoda
- Class: Insecta
- Order: Lepidoptera
- Family: Hepialidae
- Genus: Thitarodes
- Species: T. xizangensis

Binomial name
- Thitarodes xizangensis (Chu and Wang, 1985)

Synonyms
- Forkalus xizangensis Chu and Wang, 1985

Species of moth

Thitarodes xizangensis is a species of moth of the family Hepialidae. It is known from the Tibet Autonomous Region in China.
