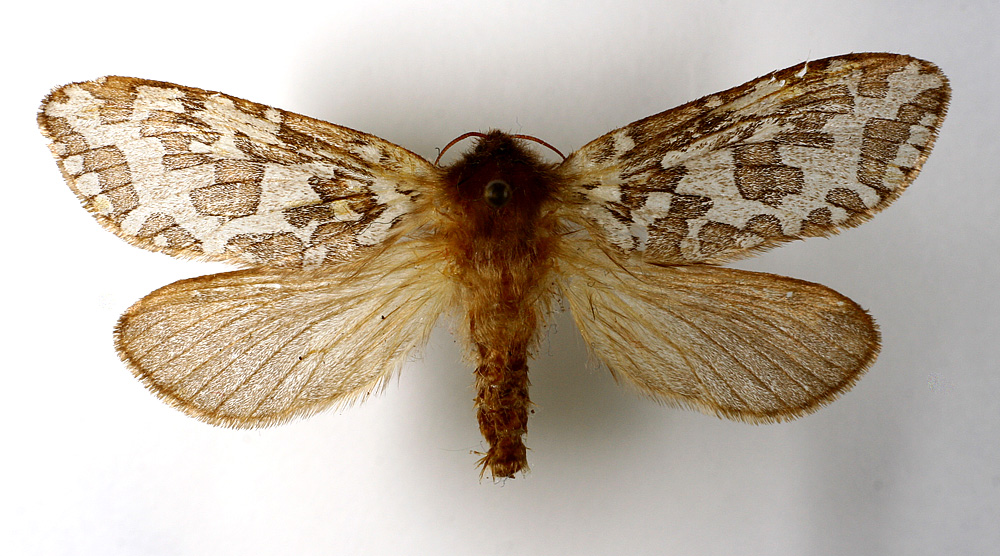

Scientific classification
- Domain: Eukaryota
- Kingdom: Animalia
- Phylum: Arthropoda
- Class: Insecta
- Order: Lepidoptera
- Family: Hepialidae
- Genus: Gazoryctra
- Species: G. fuscoargenteus

Binomial name
- Gazoryctra fuscoargenteus (O. Bang-Haas, 1927)

Synonyms
- Hepialus fuscoargenteus O. Bang-Haas, 1927; Hepialus sordida Nordstrom, 1929; Pharmacis fuscoargenteus; Gazoryctra fuscoargentea postmaculata (Landin, 1943)

= Gazoryctra fuscoargenteus =

Species of moth

Gazoryctra fuscoargenteus is a moth of the family Hepialidae. It is found from northern Scandinavia to Siberia and the Kamchatka Peninsula.

The wingspan is 37–42 mm for males and 39–50 mm for females. Adults are on wing from the end of July to the beginning of August.

The larvae feed on Betula nana.
