= Thitarodes yadongensis =

Scientific classification
- Domain: Eukaryota
- Kingdom: Animalia
- Phylum: Arthropoda
- Class: Insecta
- Order: Lepidoptera
- Family: Hepialidae
- Genus: Thitarodes
- Species: T. yadongensis

Binomial name
- Thitarodes yadongensis (Chu & Wang, 2004)

Synonyms
- Hepialus yadongensis Chu & Wang, 2004

Species of moth

Thitarodes yadongensis is a species of moth in the family Hepialidae. It is found in western China.
