= Thitarodes armoricanus =

Scientific classification
- Domain: Eukaryota
- Kingdom: Animalia
- Phylum: Arthropoda
- Class: Insecta
- Order: Lepidoptera
- Family: Hepialidae
- Genus: Thitarodes
- Species: T. armoricanus

Binomial name
- Thitarodes armoricanus (Oberthür, 1909)

Synonyms
- Hepialus armoricanus Oberthür, 1909; Hepialus altissima Daniel, 1940

Species of moth

Thitarodes armoricanus is a species of moth of the family Hepialidae. It was described by Charles Oberthür in 1909, and is known from the Tibet Autonomous Region, in China.
