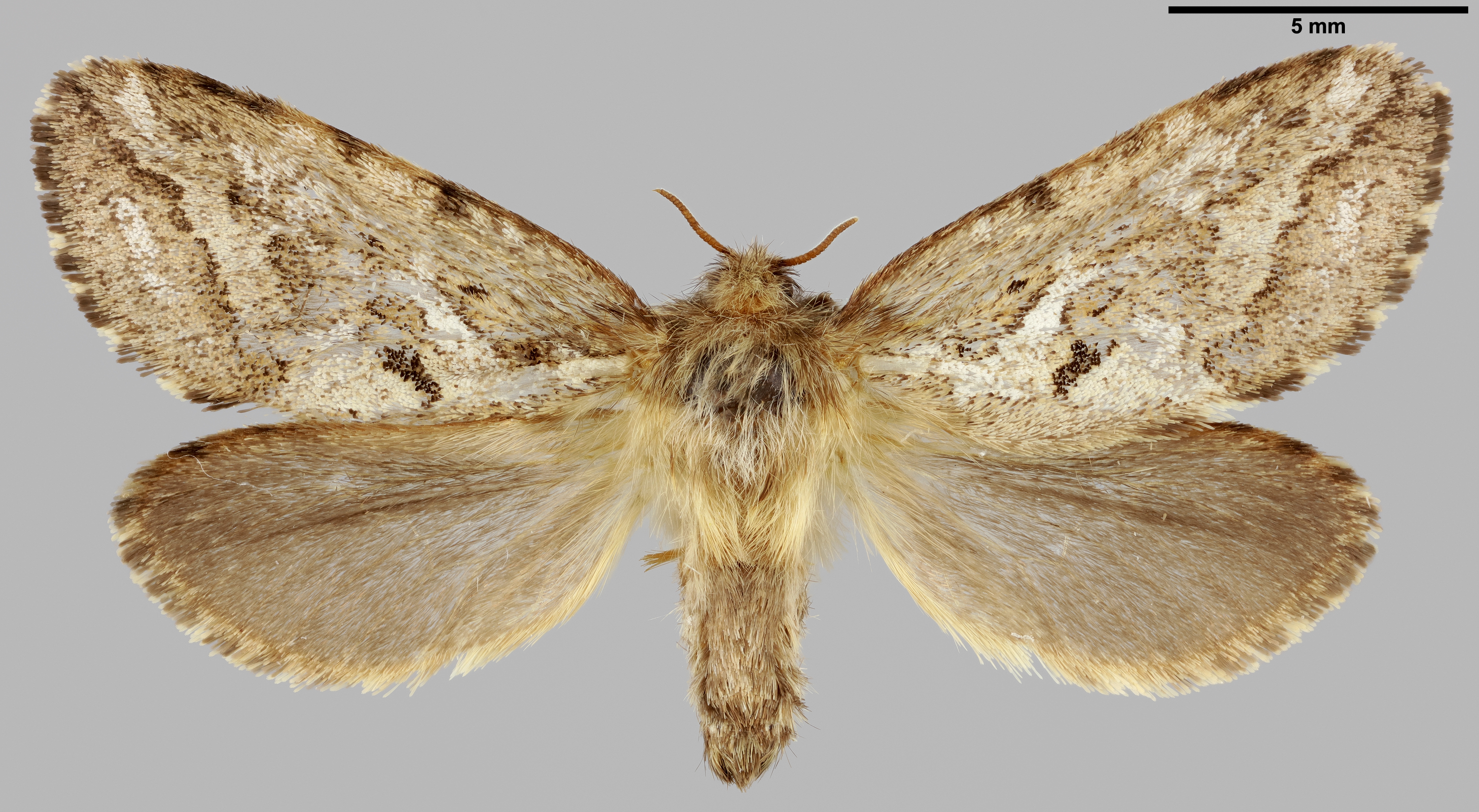

Scientific classification
- Domain: Eukaryota
- Kingdom: Animalia
- Phylum: Arthropoda
- Class: Insecta
- Order: Lepidoptera
- Family: Hepialidae
- Genus: Thitarodes
- Species: T. variabilis

Binomial name
- Thitarodes variabilis (Bremer, 1861)

Synonyms
- Hepialus variabilis Bremer, 1861

= Thitarodes variabilis =

Species of moth

Thitarodes variabilis is a species of moth of the family Hepialidae. It was described by Otto Vasilievich Bremer in 1861 and is known from the Russian Far East.
