= Thitarodes caligophilus =

Scientific classification
- Kingdom: Animalia
- Phylum: Arthropoda
- Clade: Pancrustacea
- Class: Insecta
- Order: Lepidoptera
- Family: Hepialidae
- Genus: Thitarodes
- Species: T. caligophilus

Binomial name
- Thitarodes caligophilus Maczey, in Maczey et al., 2010

Species of moth

Thitarodes caligophilus is a species of moth of the family Hepialidae. It is found in Bhutan. It is a host of the entomopathogenic fungus Ophiocordyceps sinensis, a species of the genus Cordyceps. The fruiting bodies of Ophiocordyceps sinensis are used extensively in Traditional Chinese medicine. As a result, T. caligophilus-sourced Cordyceps harvested in Bhutan have become "widely used".
