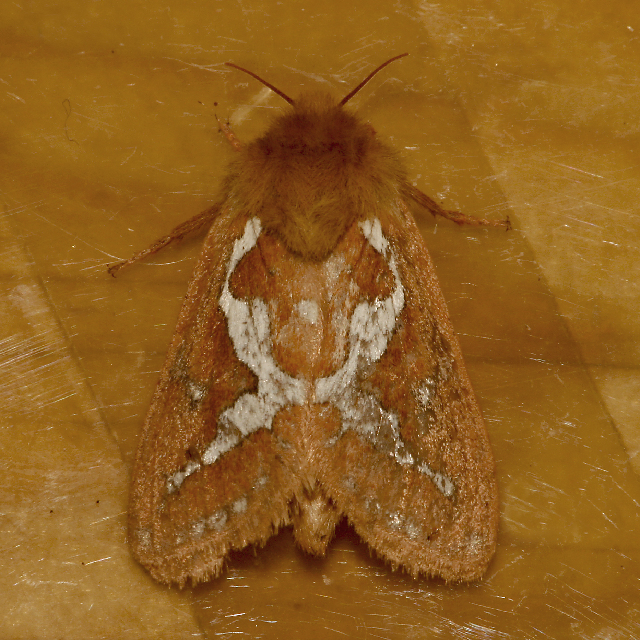

Scientific classification
- Domain: Eukaryota
- Kingdom: Animalia
- Phylum: Arthropoda
- Class: Insecta
- Order: Lepidoptera
- Family: Hepialidae
- Genus: Gazoryctra
- Species: G. mathewi

Binomial name
- Gazoryctra mathewi (W.H. Edwards, 1874)

Synonyms
- Epialus mathewi W.H. Edwards, 1874; Gazoryctra matthewi

= Gazoryctra mathewi =

Species of moth

Gazoryctra mathewi, or Mathew's ghost moth, is a moth of the family Hepialidae. It is known from western North America, including British Columbia, Washington and California. It has a wingspan of 34 mm.
