= Thitarodes jiachaensis =

Scientific classification
- Domain: Eukaryota
- Kingdom: Animalia
- Phylum: Arthropoda
- Class: Insecta
- Order: Lepidoptera
- Family: Hepialidae
- Genus: Thitarodes
- Species: T. jiachaensis

Binomial name
- Thitarodes jiachaensis Z.W. Zou, X. Liu & G.R. Zhang, 2011

Species of moth

Thitarodes jiachaensis is a species of moth of the family Hepialidae. It is found in Tibet, China.
