= Gazoryctra chishimana =

Scientific classification
- Kingdom: Animalia
- Phylum: Arthropoda
- Clade: Pancrustacea
- Class: Insecta
- Order: Lepidoptera
- Family: Hepialidae
- Genus: Gazoryctra
- Species: G. chishimana

Binomial name
- Gazoryctra chishimana (Matsumura, 1931)

Synonyms
- Hepialus chishimana Matsumura, 1931; Hepialus nesiotes Bryk, 1942

Species of moth

Gazoryctra chishimana is a moth of the family Hepialidae. It is known from the Kuril Islands and Japan.
