= Thitarodes nipponensis =

Scientific classification
- Domain: Eukaryota
- Kingdom: Animalia
- Phylum: Arthropoda
- Class: Insecta
- Order: Lepidoptera
- Family: Hepialidae
- Genus: Thitarodes
- Species: T. nipponensis

Binomial name
- Thitarodes nipponensis Ueda, 1995

Species of moth

Thitarodes nipponensis is a species of moth of the family Hepialidae. It was described by Kyoichiro Ueda in 1995, and is known from Japan.

The forewings are 14–19 mm in length and are brownish or yellowish with lighter markings. The hindwings are greyish brown, with a more brownish-yellow coloring on the apical area of the costa and the cilia.
