= Thitarodes eberti =

Scientific classification
- Kingdom: Animalia
- Phylum: Arthropoda
- Class: Insecta
- Order: Lepidoptera
- Family: Hepialidae
- Genus: Thitarodes
- Species: T. eberti

Binomial name
- Thitarodes eberti Viette, 1968

Species of moth

Thitarodes eberti is a species of moth of the family Hepialidae. It was described by Pierre Viette in 1968, and is known from Nepal.
