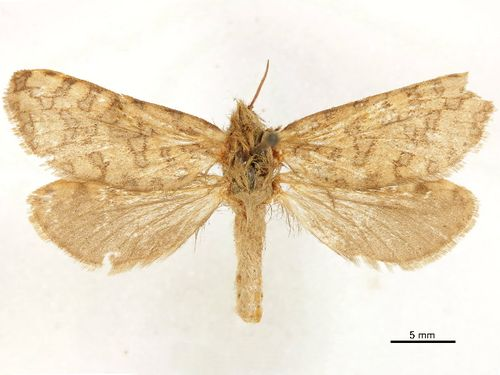

Scientific classification
- Kingdom: Animalia
- Phylum: Arthropoda
- Clade: Pancrustacea
- Class: Insecta
- Order: Lepidoptera
- Family: Hepialidae
- Genus: Gazoryctra
- Species: G. lembertii

Binomial name
- Gazoryctra lembertii (Dyar, 1894)

Synonyms
- Hepialus lembertii Dyar, 1894

= Gazoryctra lembertii =

Species of moth

Gazoryctra lembertii is a moth of the family Hepialidae. It is known from the United States, including California.

The wingspan is about 32 mm.
