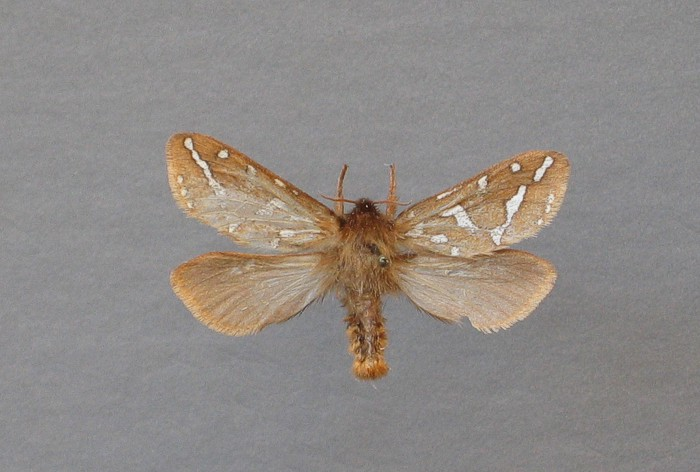

Scientific classification
- Kingdom: Animalia
- Phylum: Arthropoda
- Class: Insecta
- Order: Lepidoptera
- Family: Hepialidae
- Genus: Gazoryctra
- Species: G. ganna

Binomial name
- Gazoryctra ganna (Hübner, [1808])

Synonyms
- Bombyx ganna Hubner, [1808]; Hepialus arcticus Boheman, 1848; Hepialus confluens Hellweger, 1914; Hepialus reducta Deutsch, 1930

= Gazoryctra ganna =

Species of moth

Gazoryctra ganna is a moth of the family Hepialidae. It is found in Sweden, Finland, Russia (Siberia), France, Switzerland, Austria, Italy and Kazakhstan.

The wingspan is 31–34 mm for males and 38–39 mm for females.
