= Thitarodes varians =

Scientific classification
- Domain: Eukaryota
- Kingdom: Animalia
- Phylum: Arthropoda
- Class: Insecta
- Order: Lepidoptera
- Family: Hepialidae
- Genus: Thitarodes
- Species: T. varians

Binomial name
- Thitarodes varians (Staudinger, 1896)

Synonyms
- Hepialus varians Staudinger, 1896

Species of moth

Thitarodes varians is a species of moth of the family Hepialidae. It was described by Staudinger in 1896, and is known from the Tibet Autonomous Region in China.
