= Thitarodes arizanus =

Scientific classification
- Kingdom: Animalia
- Phylum: Arthropoda
- Clade: Pancrustacea
- Class: Insecta
- Order: Lepidoptera
- Family: Hepialidae
- Genus: Thitarodes
- Species: T. arizanus

Binomial name
- Thitarodes arizanus (Matsumura, 1931)

Synonyms
- Hepialus arizanus Matsumura, 1931

Species of moth

Thitarodes arizanus is a species of moth of the family Hepialidae. It was described by Shōnen Matsumura in 1931 and is endemic to Taiwan.
