= Thitarodes shambalaensis =

Scientific classification
- Kingdom: Animalia
- Phylum: Arthropoda
- Clade: Pancrustacea
- Class: Insecta
- Order: Lepidoptera
- Family: Hepialidae
- Genus: Thitarodes
- Species: T. shambalaensis

Binomial name
- Thitarodes shambalaensis (Z. Wang et al., 2019)

Synonyms
- Hepialus shambalaensis Wang et al., 2019

Species of moth discovered in Sichuan, China

Thitarodes shambalaensis is a species of moth of the family Hepialidae. It was described by Zhengyang Wang, along with Hailing Zhuang, Min Wang, and Naomi E. Pierce in 2019, and is known from Sichuan, China from the Tibetan Plateau, where it was found on the Yanzigou glacial valley, Mt. Gongga. It was differentiated as a new species using morphological and genetic evidence, including genome-wide analysis of SNPs and COI barcodes. Notably, this species is a host for the caterpillar fungus Ophiocordyceps sinensis, which is economically important for its use in traditional herbal medicine. This fungus is in decline due to overharvesting and climate change. Species in the genus Thitarodes are largely unknown due to logistical difficulties in collecting adult, male specimens (which are often not attracted to light), correct identification of their genitalia, and lack of accessible holotypes.

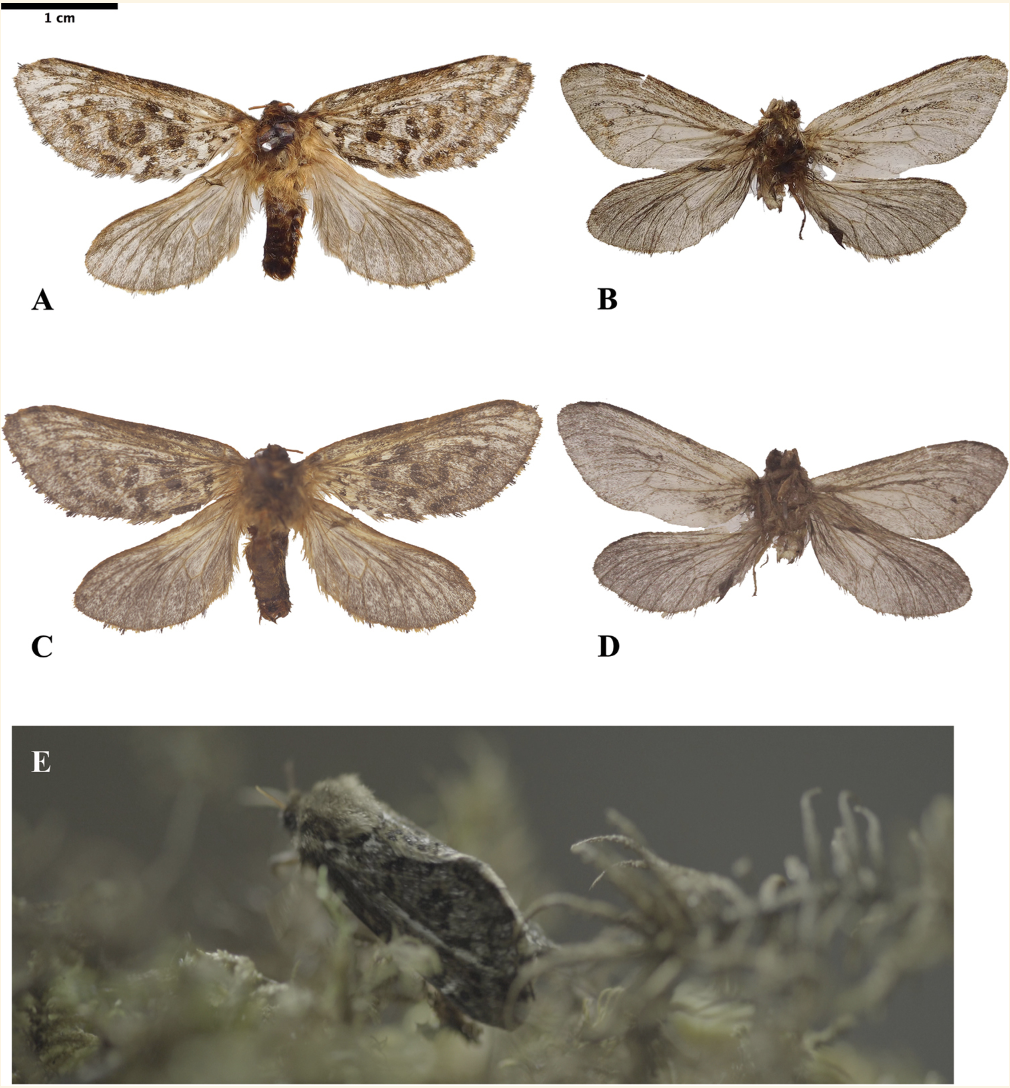
Pinned holotype and paratypes, and wild specimens of Thitarodes shambaliensis
