= Thitarodes albipictus =

Scientific classification
- Domain: Eukaryota
- Kingdom: Animalia
- Phylum: Arthropoda
- Class: Insecta
- Order: Lepidoptera
- Family: Hepialidae
- Genus: Thitarodes
- Species: T. albipictus

Binomial name
- Thitarodes albipictus (D.R. Yang, 1993)

Synonyms
- Hepialus albipictus Yang, 1993

Species of moth

Thitarodes albipictus is a species of moth of the family Hepialidae. It was described by D.R. Yang in 1993, and is known from Yunnan, China.
