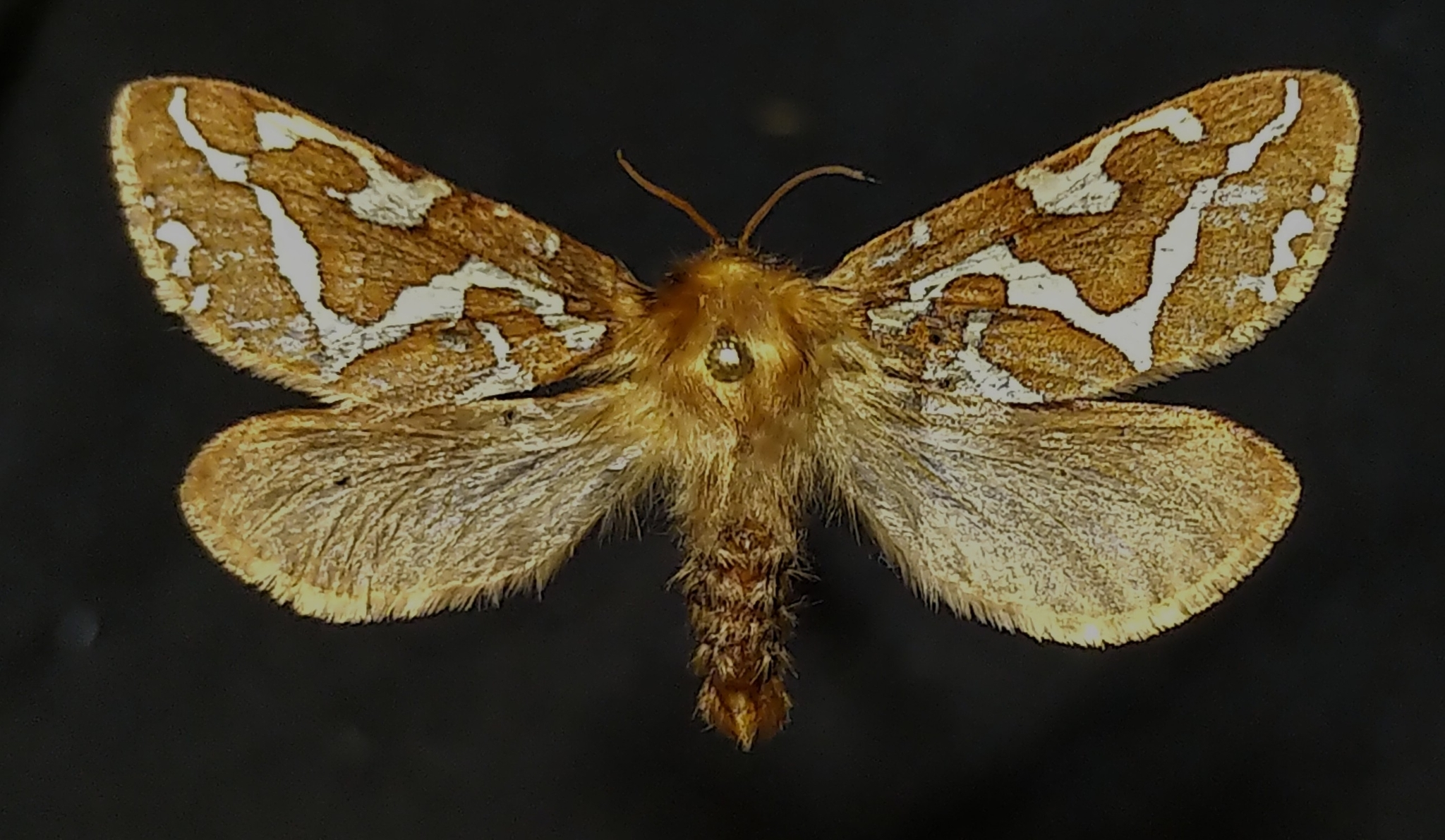

Scientific classification
- Kingdom: Animalia
- Phylum: Arthropoda
- Class: Insecta
- Order: Lepidoptera
- Family: Hepialidae
- Genus: Gazoryctra
- Species: G. hyperboreus

Binomial name
- Gazoryctra hyperboreus (Moschler, 1862)

Synonyms
- Epialus hyperboreus Moschler, 1862; Gazoryctra hyperborea

= Gazoryctra hyperboreus =

Species of moth

Gazoryctra hyperboreus is a species of moth in the family Hepialidae that was first described by Heinrich Benno Möschler in 1862. It is known in North America from New England and Quebec west to the foothills of Alberta.
