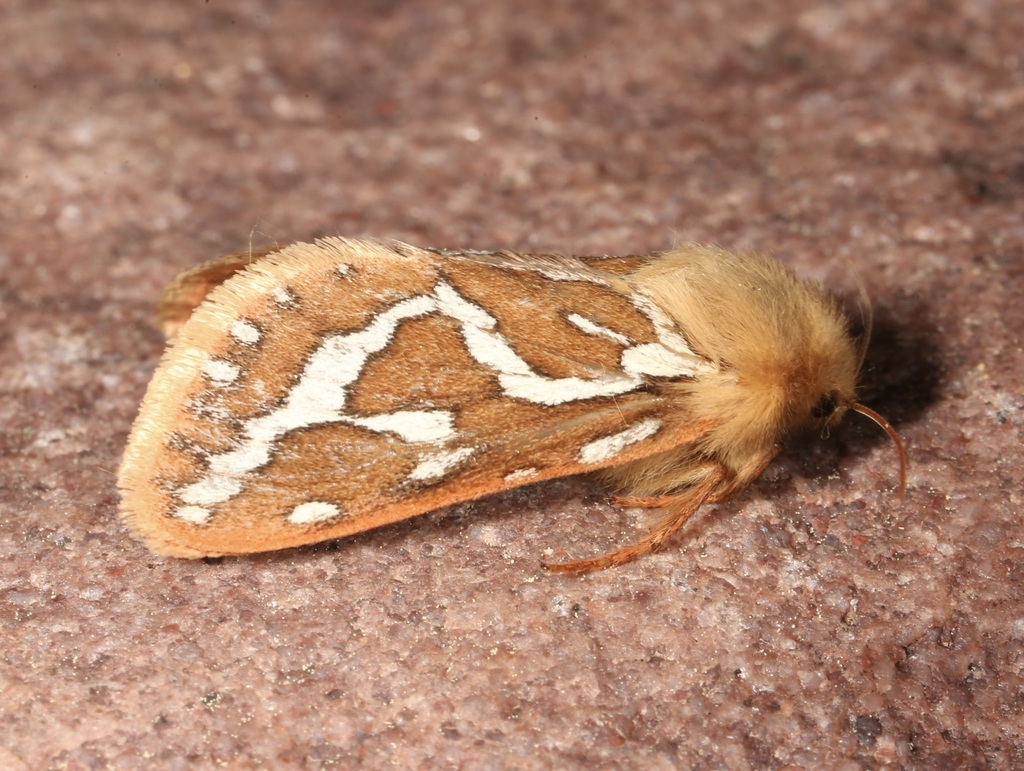

Scientific classification
- Domain: Eukaryota
- Kingdom: Animalia
- Phylum: Arthropoda
- Class: Insecta
- Order: Lepidoptera
- Family: Hepialidae
- Genus: Gazoryctra
- Species: G. wielgusi

Binomial name
- Gazoryctra wielgusi Wagner and Tindale, 1988

= Gazoryctra wielgusi =

Species of moth

Gazoryctra wielgusi is a moth of the family Hepialidae. It is known from Arizona and New Mexico.

The length of the forewings is 15–18 mm. Adults are pink and silvery. They are on wing in July and August.
