= Thitarodes xunhuaensis =

Scientific classification
- Domain: Eukaryota
- Kingdom: Animalia
- Phylum: Arthropoda
- Class: Insecta
- Order: Lepidoptera
- Family: Hepialidae
- Genus: Thitarodes
- Species: T. xunhuaensis

Binomial name
- Thitarodes xunhuaensis (Yang & Yang, 1995)

Synonyms
- Hepialus xunhuaensis Yang & Yang, 1995

Species of moth

Thitarodes xunhuaensis is a species of moth of the family Hepialidae. It was described by Yang and Yang in 1995, and is known from Qinghai, China.
