= Thitarodes namnai =

Scientific classification
- Domain: Eukaryota
- Kingdom: Animalia
- Phylum: Arthropoda
- Class: Insecta
- Order: Lepidoptera
- Family: Hepialidae
- Genus: Thitarodes
- Species: T. namnai

Binomial name
- Thitarodes namnai Maczey, in Maczey et al., 2010

Species of moth

Thitarodes namnai is a species of moth of the family Hepialidae. It is found in Bhutan.
