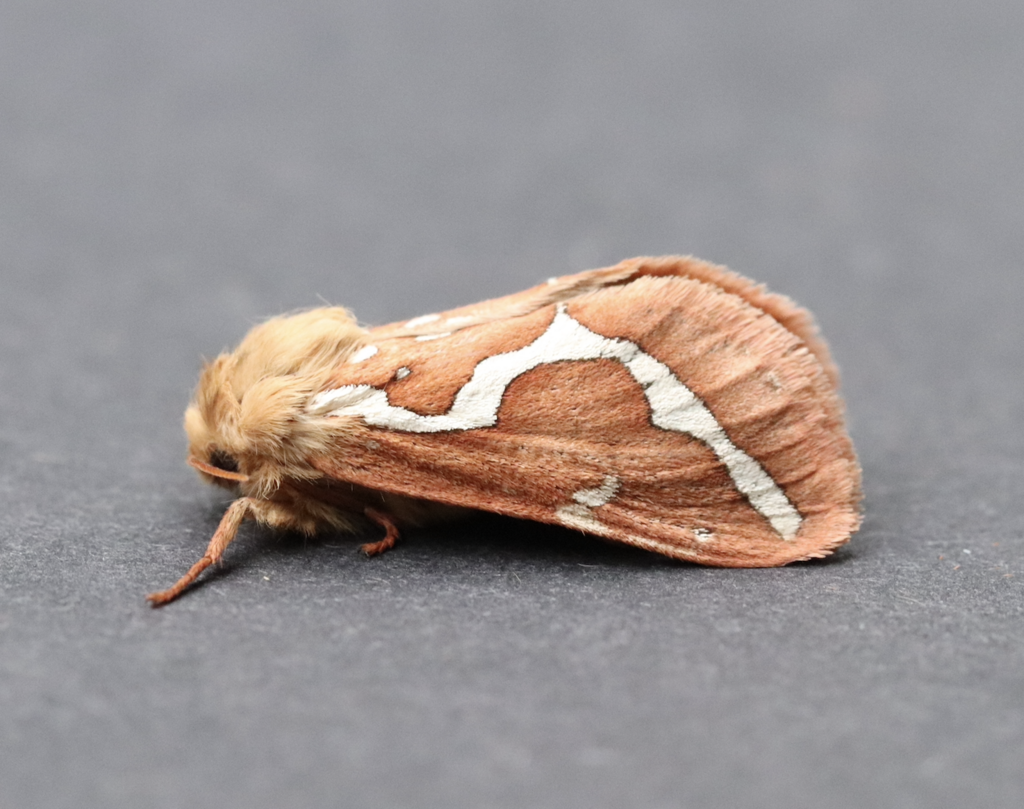

Scientific classification
- Domain: Eukaryota
- Kingdom: Animalia
- Phylum: Arthropoda
- Class: Insecta
- Order: Lepidoptera
- Family: Hepialidae
- Genus: Gazoryctra
- Species: G. novigannus

Binomial name
- Gazoryctra novigannus (Barnes & Benjamin, [1926])

Synonyms
- Hepialus novigannus Barnes & Benjamin, [1926]; Hepialus mackiei Barnes & Benjamin, [1926]; Gazoryctra novigana

= Gazoryctra novigannus =

Species of moth

Gazoryctra novigannus is a moth of the family Hepialidae first described by William Barnes and Foster Hendrickson Benjamin in 1926. It is known in North America, from Quebec, west to the Rocky Mountains and south to Arizona.
