= Thitarodes yongshengensis =

Scientific classification
- Domain: Eukaryota
- Kingdom: Animalia
- Phylum: Arthropoda
- Class: Insecta
- Order: Lepidoptera
- Family: Hepialidae
- Genus: Thitarodes
- Species: T. yongshengensis

Binomial name
- Thitarodes yongshengensis (Chu & Wang, 2004)

Synonyms
- Hepialus yongshengensis Chu & Wang, 2004

Species of moth

Thitarodes yongshengensis is a species of moth of the family Hepialidae. It is found in China.
