= Thitarodes cingulatus =

Scientific classification
- Domain: Eukaryota
- Kingdom: Animalia
- Phylum: Arthropoda
- Class: Insecta
- Order: Lepidoptera
- Family: Hepialidae
- Genus: Thitarodes
- Species: T. cingulatus

Binomial name
- Thitarodes cingulatus (Yang & Zhang, 1995)

Synonyms
- Hepialus cingulatus Yang & Zhang, 1995

Species of moth

Thitarodes cingulatus is a species of moth of the family Hepialidae. It was described by Yang and Zhang in 1995, and is known from Gansu, China.
