= Thitarodes callinivalis =

Scientific classification
- Domain: Eukaryota
- Kingdom: Animalia
- Phylum: Arthropoda
- Class: Insecta
- Order: Lepidoptera
- Family: Hepialidae
- Genus: Thitarodes
- Species: T. callinivalis

Binomial name
- Thitarodes callinivalis (Liang, 1995)

Synonyms
- Hepialus callinivalis Liang, 1995

Species of moth

Thitarodes callinivalis is a species of moth of the family Hepialidae. It was described by Liang in 1995, and is known from Yunnan, China.
