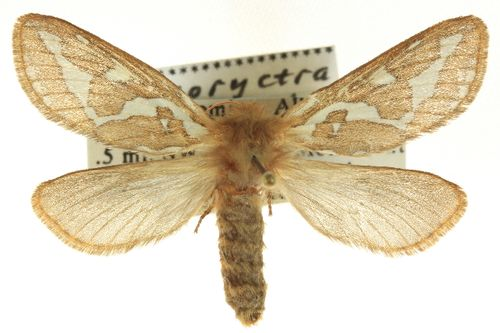

Scientific classification
- Kingdom: Animalia
- Phylum: Arthropoda
- Class: Insecta
- Order: Lepidoptera
- Family: Hepialidae
- Genus: Gazoryctra
- Species: G. pulcher

Binomial name
- Gazoryctra pulcher (Grote, [1865])

Synonyms
- Hepialus pulcher Grote, [1865]; Gazoryctra pulchra

= Gazoryctra pulcher =

Species of moth

Gazoryctra pulcher is a moth of the family Hepialidae. It is known from the United States, including Colorado, New Mexico and Utah.

The wingspan is about 33 mm.
