= Phymatopus japonicus =

Scientific classification
- Kingdom: Animalia
- Phylum: Arthropoda
- Class: Insecta
- Order: Lepidoptera
- Family: Hepialidae
- Genus: Phymatopus
- Species: P. japonicus

Binomial name
- Phymatopus japonicus Inoue, 1982

Species of moth

Phymatopus japonicus is a species of moth belonging to the family Hepialidae. It was described by Hiroshi Inoue in 1982, and is known from Japan, from which its species epithet is derived. The food plant for this species is Pteridium.
