= Thitarodes zhangmoensis =

Scientific classification
- Domain: Eukaryota
- Kingdom: Animalia
- Phylum: Arthropoda
- Class: Insecta
- Order: Lepidoptera
- Family: Hepialidae
- Genus: Thitarodes
- Species: T. zhangmoensis

Binomial name
- Thitarodes zhangmoensis (Chu & Wang, 1985)

Synonyms
- Hepialus zhangmoensis Chu & Wang, 1985

Species of moth

Thitarodes zhangmoensis is a species of moth of the family Hepialidae. It was described by Hong-Fu Chu and Lin-Yao Wang in 1985 and is known from Xinjiang, China.
