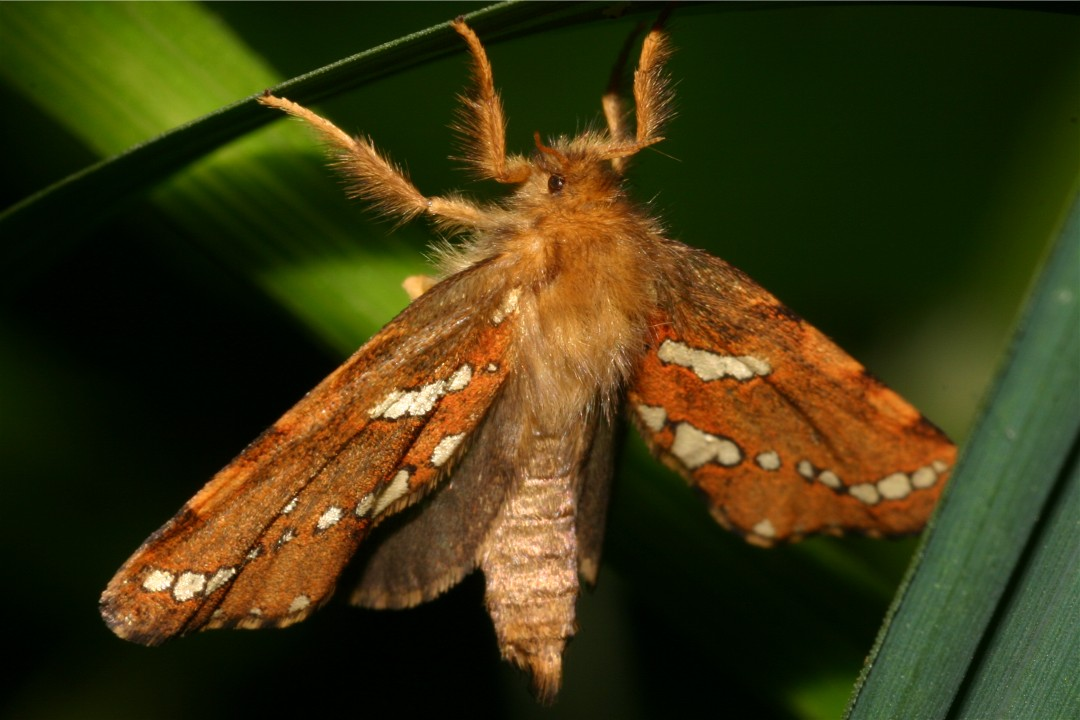

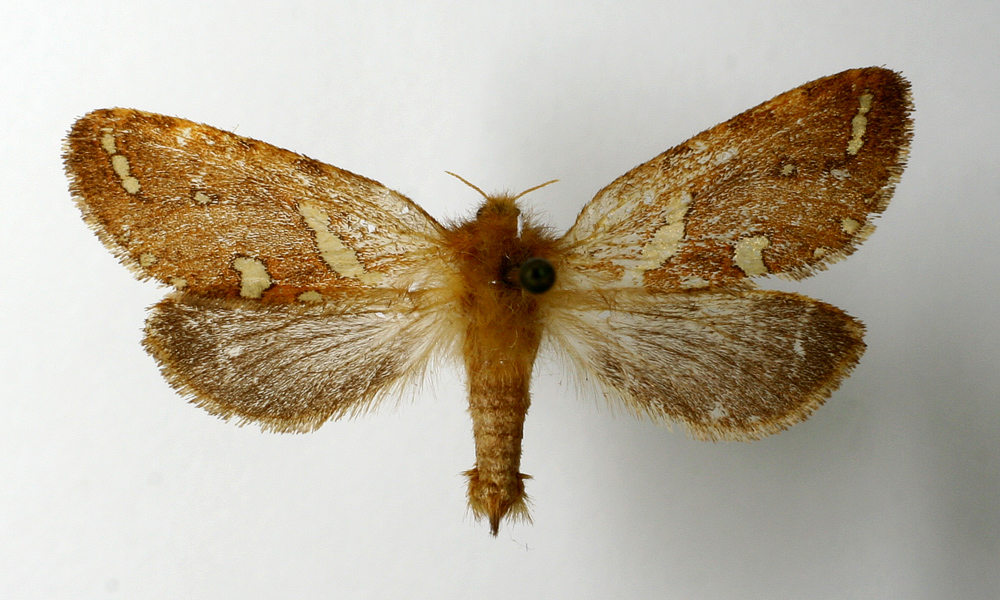

Scientific classification
- Kingdom: Animalia
- Phylum: Arthropoda
- Class: Insecta
- Order: Lepidoptera
- Family: Hepialidae
- Genus: Phymatopus
- Species: P. hecta

Binomial name
- Phymatopus hecta (Linnaeus, Lepidoptera in the 10th edition of Systema Naturae appendix)

Synonyms
- List: Noctua hecta Linnaeus, 1758; Bombyx flina [Denis and Schiffermüller], 1775; Phalaena clavipes Retzius, 1783; Noctua nemorosa Esper, 1786; Hepialus hectator Haworth, 1802; Hepialus unicolor Petersen, 1902; Hepialus decorata Krulikowsky, 1908; Hepialus decorata Rebel, 1910; Hepialus strigosa Hartwieg, 1922; Hepialus nigra Lempke, 1938; Hepialus confluens BytinskiSalz, 1939; Hepialus inversa Bytinski-Salz, 1939; Hepialus ornata Bytinski-Salz, 1939; Hepialus zetterstedti Burrau, 1950; Hepialus radiata Lucas, 1959; Hepialus continua van Wisselingh, 1961; Phimatopus brunnea Lempke, 1961; Phimatopus fusca Lempke, 1961; Phimatopus reducta Lempke, 1961; Phimatopus rufa Lempke, 1961

= Gold swift =

Species of moth

The gold swift (Phymatopus hecta) is a moth belonging to the family Hepialidae. Until recently it was placed in the genus Hepialus. The species was first described by Carl Linnaeus in his 1758 10th edition of Systema Naturae. Moths of the Hepialidae are considered to be primitive moths; they do not have a proboscis and are unable to feed. The gold swift is a widespread species found in Europe and Asia, including Japan.

== Life history ==
This is a rather small moth for the family, with a wingspan of 26–32 mm. The male is distinctive, the brown forewings marked with two parallel bands of white markings. The larger female is less striking with muted grey-and-brown markings. The adult is on the wing in June and July (this refers to the British Isles; other parts of the range may differ) and both sexes are moderately attracted to light. To attract females, the male emits a scent rather similar to pineapple.

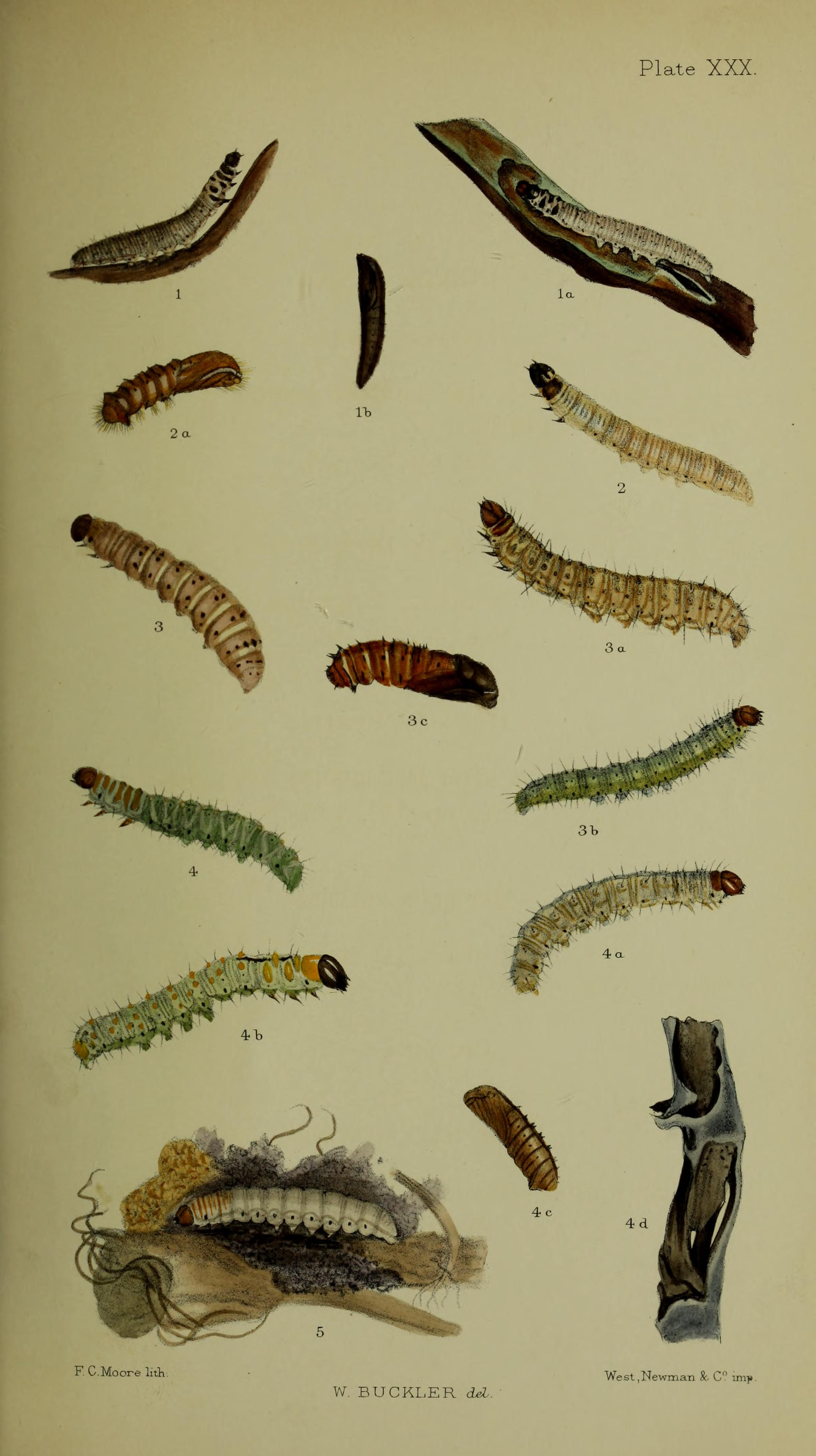
Figs.1,1a larvae after last moult in roots of fern (Pteris aquilina) 1b pupa

The adult moths spend most of the 24 hours resting, in a wide variety of places from the tree canopy to the base of the ground vegetation. They are active only for two brief periods: for an hour or two around sunset, when they mate and previously mated females lay eggs; and then very briefly for about 15 minutes at sunrise, when mating pairs separate, and males that have remained overnight in exposed positions move to less visible places. Very occasionally, and usually in mountainous areas, there is a period of activity in the mid-afternoon.

=== Courtship and mating ===
The mating system is spectacular, but rarely observed because it takes place in the late evening, on either side of sunset. A number of males gather in one limited space and start to display, alternating between perching on the vegetation with their wings spread out, or flying rapidly in a figure of 8 pattern which is so quick that the human eye interprets it as a “pendulum” motion. The males prominently dangle their modified hindlegs, which end in yellow brushes that disperse an attractive scent, or pheromone. Males also fight: either swinging into each other, or rising in the air in a vibrating dance, in which they try to exhaust each other. The loser usually flies right away, off site.

Females fly onto the site, and courtships take place in a bewildering variety. The female may fly to one of the perched males, or to a perch of her own choosing; she may be pursued on the way by one or more males, or males may fly to her after she perches. Or she may perform a mutual courtship dance with a flying male. Or a male and female, both perched, may approach each other by progressive changes of perch. Coupling is acrobatic and "front to back": the pair hang with the male in front and the female behind, facing the same way, and by a corkscrew action of the abdomens finish with the female hanging vertically by her front feet, and the male dangling upside down and held to her only by the grip of the genitalia. They remain in this posture until the following dawn. Some authorities believe that this mating system constitutes a lek (or lek mating), analogous to the mating of black grouse, in which females prefer to mate with a single dominant male whose display behaviour has demonstrated his superiority to all the other males. Others believe that the swift moths are radically different from the grouse, and constitute a functional mate acquisition system, or male mating swarm.

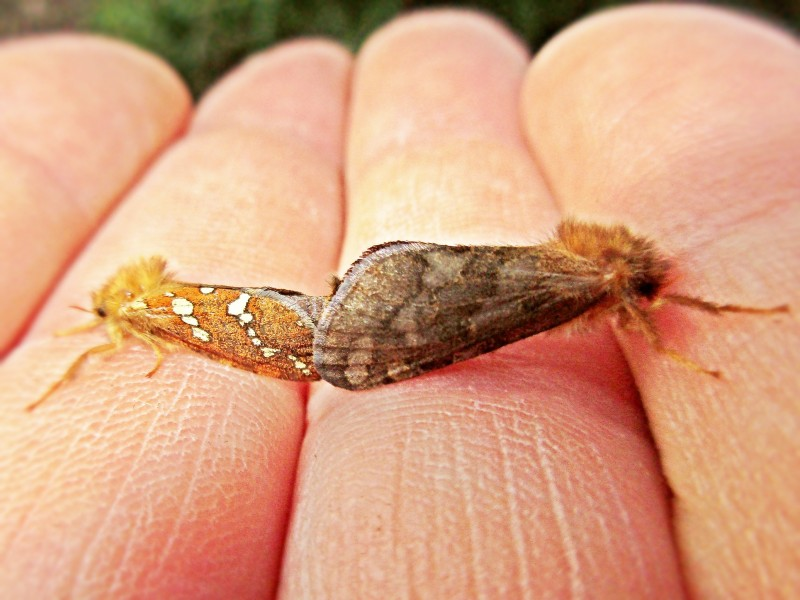
Male and female

=== Ovum ===
The females broadcast the eggs above the foodplant. Eggs are spherical, white when laid and rapidly turn blueish black.

=== Larva ===
Larvae are more than 28 mm long; the body is pale greyish brown with shining dark brown or black dorsal plate on each thoracic segment and the head is black or brownish black. They feed from July to June of the second year in the stem of bracken, overwintering twice. In the final instar they feed at the surface on young shoots.

=== Pupation ===
The pupa stage is short and takes place in May or early June in leaf litter or moss, in a thin cocoon covered in soil or plant remains.

== Etymology ==
The species was first described by the Swedish taxonomist, Carl Linnaeus in 1758. Previously placed in the genus Hepialus – from the Greek; hēpialos – meaning a fever, as in 'the fitful, alternating flight' of the moth. It has since been allocated to the genus Phymatopus. The specific name hecta is from the Greek hektikos – feverish or hectic; from either the flushed forewing or the moths' flight, or both.
