= Thitarodes namensis =

Scientific classification
- Domain: Eukaryota
- Kingdom: Animalia
- Phylum: Arthropoda
- Class: Insecta
- Order: Lepidoptera
- Family: Hepialidae
- Genus: Thitarodes
- Species: T. namensis

Binomial name
- Thitarodes namensis (H.F. Chu & L.Y. Wang, 2004)

Synonyms
- Hepialus namensis H.F. Chu & L.Y. Wang, 2004

Species of moth

Thitarodes namensis is a species of moth of the family Hepialidae. It is found in China.
