= Thitarodes markamensis =

Scientific classification
- Domain: Eukaryota
- Kingdom: Animalia
- Phylum: Arthropoda
- Class: Insecta
- Order: Lepidoptera
- Family: Hepialidae
- Genus: Thitarodes
- Species: T. markamensis

Binomial name
- Thitarodes markamensis (Yang, Li and Shen, 1992)

Synonyms
- Hepialus markamensis Yang, Li and Shen, 1992

Species of moth

Thitarodes markamensis is a species of moth of the family Hepialidae. It was described by Yang in 1992, and is known from the Tibet Autonomous Region in China.
