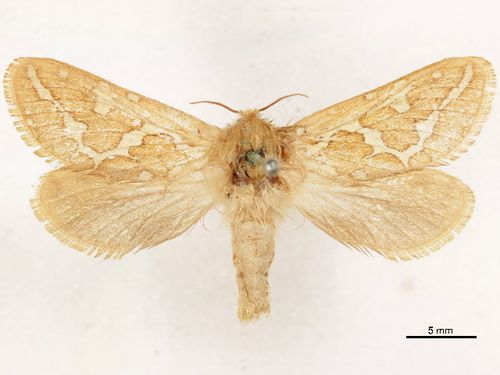

Scientific classification
- Kingdom: Animalia
- Phylum: Arthropoda
- Clade: Pancrustacea
- Class: Insecta
- Order: Lepidoptera
- Family: Hepialidae
- Genus: Gazoryctra
- Species: G. mcglashani

Binomial name
- Gazoryctra mcglashani (Edwards, 1886)

Synonyms
- Hepialus mcglashani Edwards, 1886; Gazoryctra mcglaschanii

= Gazoryctra mcglashani =

Species of moth

Gazoryctra mcglashani is a moth of the family Hepialidae. It is known from the United States, including California.
