= Hepialus xiaojinensis =

Scientific classification
- Kingdom: Animalia
- Phylum: Arthropoda
- Class: Insecta
- Order: Lepidoptera
- Family: Hepialidae
- Genus: Hepialus
- Species: H. xiaojinensis

Binomial name
- Hepialus xiaojinensis Y.Q. Tu, K.S. Ma & D.L. Zhang, 2009

Species of moth

Hepialus xiaojinensis is a species of moth of the family Hepialidae. It is found in Sichuan, China.

The wingspan is 17–19 millimetres (0.67–0.75 in).

== Etymology ==
The species is named after the type locality, Xiaojin County, Aba City, Sichuan Province.
