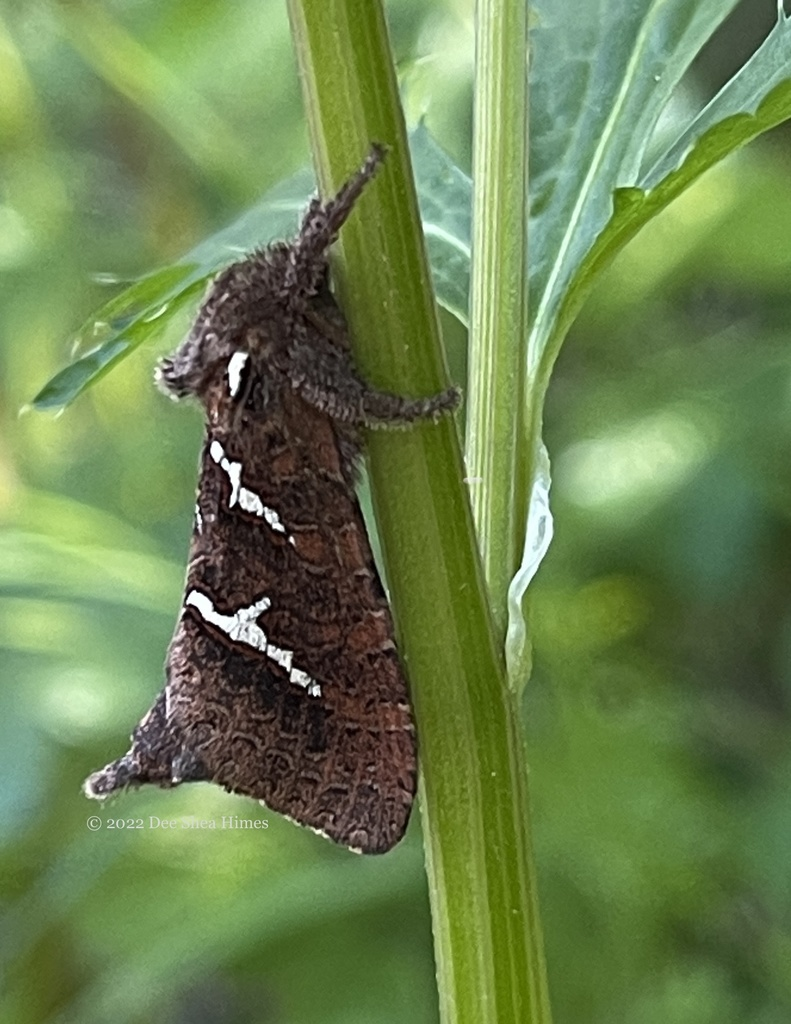

Scientific classification
- Domain: Eukaryota
- Kingdom: Animalia
- Phylum: Arthropoda
- Class: Insecta
- Order: Lepidoptera
- Family: Hepialidae
- Genus: Phymatopus
- Species: P. californicus

Binomial name
- Phymatopus californicus (Boisduval, 1868)

Synonyms
- Hepialus californicus Boisduval, 1868; Hepialus sequoiolus Behrens, 1876; Hepialus mendocinolus Behrens, 1876; Hepialus baroni Behrens, 1876; Hepialus rectus Edwards, 1881; Hepialus scequoilus Edwards, 1881

= Phymatopus californicus =

Species of moth

Phymatopus californicus, the lupine ghost moth, is a species of moth belonging to the family Hepialidae. It was described by Jean Baptiste Boisduval in 1868 and is known from the US state of California.

The wingspan is about 40 mm.

Recorded food plants for the species include Lupinus, Baccharis and Eriophyllum. There is one generation per year. Pupation occurs in the fall.
