= Thitarodes namlinensis =

Scientific classification
- Domain: Eukaryota
- Kingdom: Animalia
- Phylum: Arthropoda
- Class: Insecta
- Order: Lepidoptera
- Family: Hepialidae
- Genus: Thitarodes
- Species: T. namlinensis

Binomial name
- Thitarodes namlinensis (Chu & Wang, 2004)

Synonyms
- Hepialus namlinensis Chu & Wang, 2004

Species of moth

Thitarodes namlinensis is a species of moth of the family Hepialidae. It is found in China.
