= Thitarodes dongyuensis =

Scientific classification
- Domain: Eukaryota
- Kingdom: Animalia
- Phylum: Arthropoda
- Class: Insecta
- Order: Lepidoptera
- Family: Hepialidae
- Genus: Thitarodes
- Species: T. dongyuensis

Binomial name
- Thitarodes dongyuensis (Liang, 1992)

Synonyms
- Hepialus dongyuensis Liang, 1992

Species of moth

Thitarodes dongyuensis is a species of moth of the family Hepialidae. It was described by Liang in 1992, and is known from China.
