= Thitarodes zhongzhiensis =

Scientific classification
- Kingdom: Animalia
- Phylum: Arthropoda
- Class: Insecta
- Order: Lepidoptera
- Family: Hepialidae
- Genus: Thitarodes
- Species: T. zhongzhiensis

Binomial name
- Thitarodes zhongzhiensis (Liang, 1995)

Synonyms
- Hepialus zhongzhiensis Liang, 1995

Species of moth

Thitarodes zhongzhiensis is a species of moth of the family Hepialidae. It was described by Liang in 1995, and is known from Yunnan, China.
