= Thitarodes litangensis =

Scientific classification
- Domain: Eukaryota
- Kingdom: Animalia
- Phylum: Arthropoda
- Class: Insecta
- Order: Lepidoptera
- Family: Hepialidae
- Genus: Thitarodes
- Species: T. litangensis

Binomial name
- Thitarodes litangensis (Liang, 1995)

Synonyms
- Hepialus litangensis Liang, 1995

Species of insect

Thitarodes litangensis is a species of moth of the family Hepialidae. It was described by Liang in 1995, and is known from Sichuan, China.
