= Thitarodes varius =

Scientific classification
- Domain: Eukaryota
- Kingdom: Animalia
- Phylum: Arthropoda
- Class: Insecta
- Order: Lepidoptera
- Family: Hepialidae
- Genus: Thitarodes
- Species: T. varius

Binomial name
- Thitarodes varius (Staudinger, 1887)

Synonyms
- Hepialus varius Staudinger, 1887

Species of moth

Thitarodes varius is a species of moth of the family Hepialidae. It was described by Staudinger in 1887, and is known from the Russian Far East.
