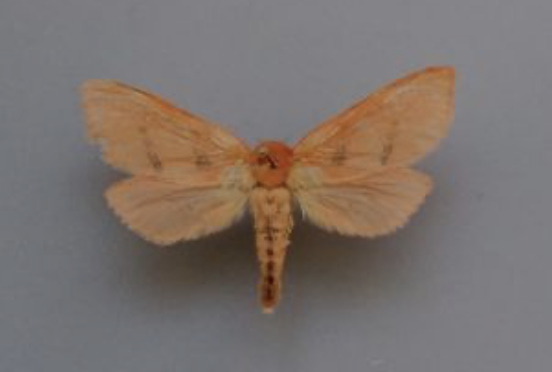

Scientific classification
- Kingdom: Animalia
- Phylum: Arthropoda
- Class: Insecta
- Order: Lepidoptera
- Family: Hepialidae
- Genus: Phymatopus
- Species: P. behrensii

Binomial name
- Phymatopus behrensii (Stretch, 1872)

Synonyms
- Sthenopis behrensii Stretch, 1872; Sthenopis behrnsii Stretch, 1872; Sthenopis montana Stretch, 1872; Epialus tacomae Edwards, 1874; Hepialus desolatus Strecker, 1875; Hepialus anceps Edwards, 1881

= Phymatopus behrensii =

Species of moth

Phymatopus behrensii is a species of moth belonging to the family Hepialidae. It was first described by Stretch in 1872, and is known from the United States (California and Washington).

The wingspan is about 43 mm.

Recorded food plants for the species include Helenium, Lupinus, Malus, and various ferns.
