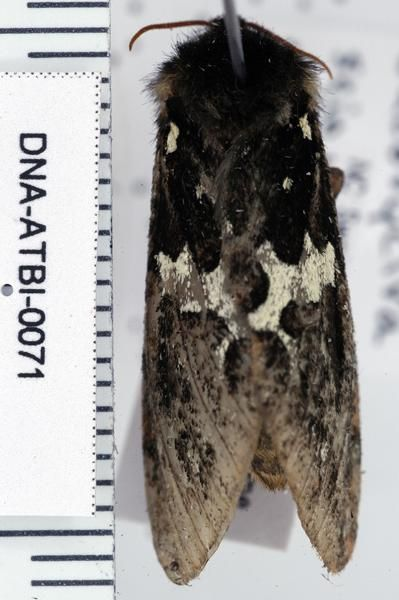

Scientific classification
- Kingdom: Animalia
- Phylum: Arthropoda
- Clade: Pancrustacea
- Class: Insecta
- Order: Lepidoptera
- Family: Hepialidae
- Genus: Gazoryctra
- Species: G. sciophanes

Binomial name
- Gazoryctra sciophanes (Ferguson, 1979)

Synonyms
- Hepialus sciophanes Ferguson, 1979

= Gazoryctra sciophanes =

Species of moth

Gazoryctra sciophanes is a moth of the family Hepialidae. It is known from the United States, including North Carolina and Tennessee.

The wingspan is about 35–38 mm.
