= Thitarodes malaisei =

Scientific classification
- Kingdom: Animalia
- Phylum: Arthropoda
- Class: Insecta
- Order: Lepidoptera
- Family: Hepialidae
- Genus: Thitarodes
- Species: T. malaisei

Binomial name
- Thitarodes malaisei (Bryk, 1946)

Synonyms
- Hepialus malaisei Bryk, 1946; Hepialus ebba Bryk, 1950

Species of moth

Thitarodes malaisei is a species of moth of the family Hepialidae. It was described by Felix Bryk in 1946 and is known from Myanmar.
