= Ahamus gangcaensis =

Scientific classification
- Domain: Eukaryota
- Kingdom: Animalia
- Phylum: Arthropoda
- Class: Insecta
- Order: Lepidoptera
- Family: Hepialidae
- Genus: Ahamus
- Species: A. gangcaensis

Binomial name
- Ahamus gangcaensis (H.F Chu & L.Y. Wang, 2004)

Synonyms
- Hepialus gangcaensis H.F. Chu & L.Y. Wang, 2004

Species of moth

Ahamus gangcaensis is a species of moth, which is of the family Hepialidae. It is found in China.
