= Phymatopus hectica =

Scientific classification
- Domain: Eukaryota
- Kingdom: Animalia
- Phylum: Arthropoda
- Class: Insecta
- Order: Lepidoptera
- Family: Hepialidae
- Genus: Phymatopus
- Species: P. hectica

Binomial name
- Phymatopus hectica (Bang-Haas, 1927)

Synonyms
- Hepialus hectica Bang-Haas, 1927; Phymatopus albomaculatus Tshistjakov, 1996

Species of moth

Phymatopus hectica is a species of moth belonging to the family Hepialidae. It was described by Otto Bang-Haas in 1927, and is known from Russia (the Russian Far East and Siberia).
