= Thitarodes pratensis =

Scientific classification
- Domain: Eukaryota
- Kingdom: Animalia
- Phylum: Arthropoda
- Class: Insecta
- Order: Lepidoptera
- Family: Hepialidae
- Genus: Thitarodes
- Species: T. pratensis

Binomial name
- Thitarodes pratensis (Yang, Li & Shen, 1992)

Synonyms
- Hepialus pratensis Yang, Li & Shen, 1992

Species of moth

Thitarodes pratensis is a species of moth of the family Hepialidae. It was described by Yang, Li and Shen in 1992, and is known from Yunnan, China.
