= Thitarodes jinshaensis =

Scientific classification
- Domain: Eukaryota
- Kingdom: Animalia
- Phylum: Arthropoda
- Class: Insecta
- Order: Lepidoptera
- Family: Hepialidae
- Genus: Thitarodes
- Species: T. jinshaensis

Binomial name
- Thitarodes jinshaensis (Yang, 1993)

Synonyms
- Hepialus jinshaensis Yang, 1993

Species of moth

Thitarodes jinshaensis is a species of moth of the family Hepialidae. It was described by Yang in the year 1993, and is known from Yunnan, China.
