= Ahamus altaicola =

Scientific classification
- Domain: Eukaryota
- Kingdom: Animalia
- Phylum: Arthropoda
- Class: Insecta
- Order: Lepidoptera
- Family: Hepialidae
- Genus: Ahamus
- Species: A. altaicola

Binomial name
- Ahamus altaicola (Wang, 1990)

Synonyms
- Hepialus altaicola Wang, 1990; Thitarodes altaicola

Species of moth

Ahamus altaicola is a species of moth of the family Hepialidae. It is found in China.
