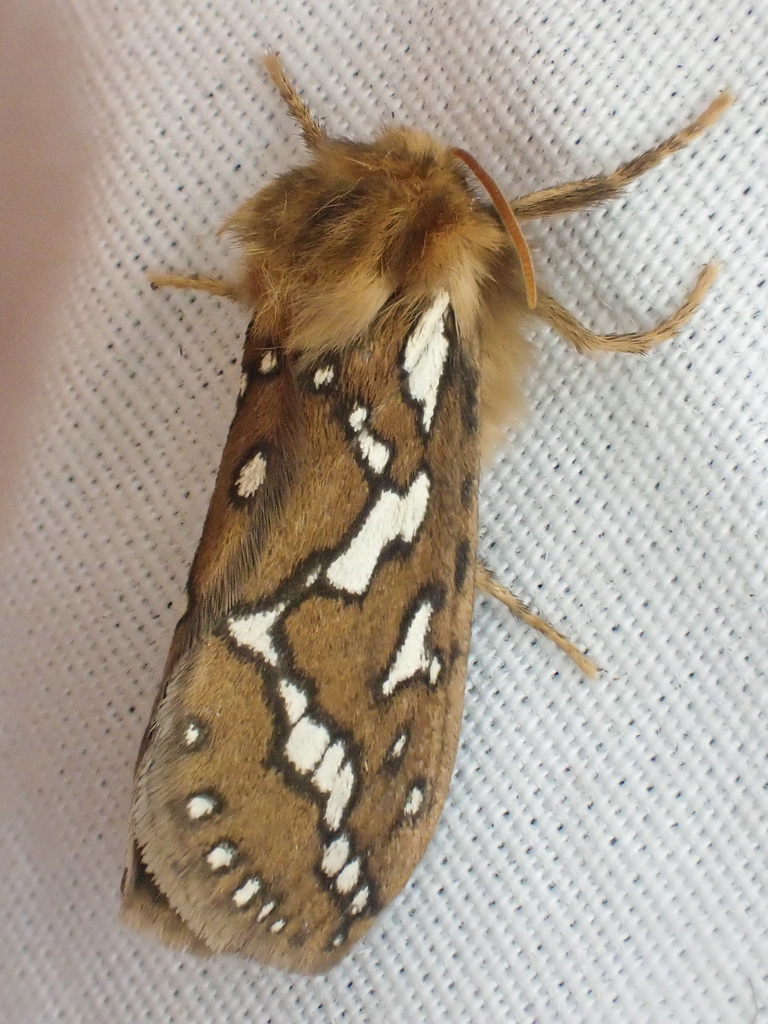

Scientific classification
- Domain: Eukaryota
- Kingdom: Animalia
- Phylum: Arthropoda
- Class: Insecta
- Order: Lepidoptera
- Family: Hepialidae
- Genus: Gazoryctra
- Species: G. roseicaput

Binomial name
- Gazoryctra roseicaput (Neumoegen and Dyar, 1893)

Synonyms
- Hepialus roseicaput Neumoegen & Dyar, 1893; Hepialus demutatus Barnes & Benjamin, [1926]; Hepialus mutatus Barnes & Benjamin, [1926]

= Gazoryctra roseicaput =

Species of moth

Gazoryctra roseicaput is a moth of the family Hepialidae. It was described by Berthold Neumoegen and Harrison Gray Dyar Jr. in 1893. It is known from the mountains of western North America, including Washington, Oregon, British Columbia and Alberta.

The wingspan is about 32 mm. Adults are dull red brown with silvery-white spots on the forewings. The hindwings are unmarked. Adults are on wing in the last half of August.
