= Thitarodes renzhiensis =

Scientific classification
- Domain: Eukaryota
- Kingdom: Animalia
- Phylum: Arthropoda
- Class: Insecta
- Order: Lepidoptera
- Family: Hepialidae
- Genus: Thitarodes
- Species: T. renzhiensis

Binomial name
- Thitarodes renzhiensis (Yang et al., 1991)

Synonyms
- Hepialus renzhiensis Yang et al., 1991

Species of moth

Thitarodes renzhiensis is a species of moth of the family Hepialidae. It was described by Yang et al. in 1991, and is known from Yunnan, China.
