= Thitarodes meiliensis =

Scientific classification
- Domain: Eukaryota
- Kingdom: Animalia
- Phylum: Arthropoda
- Class: Insecta
- Order: Lepidoptera
- Family: Hepialidae
- Genus: Thitarodes
- Species: T. meiliensis

Binomial name
- Thitarodes meiliensis (Liang, 1988)

Synonyms
- Hepialus meiliensis Liang in Liang et al., 1988

Species of moth

Thitarodes meiliensis is a species of moth of the family Hepialidae. It was described by Liang in 1988, and is known from Yunnan, China.
