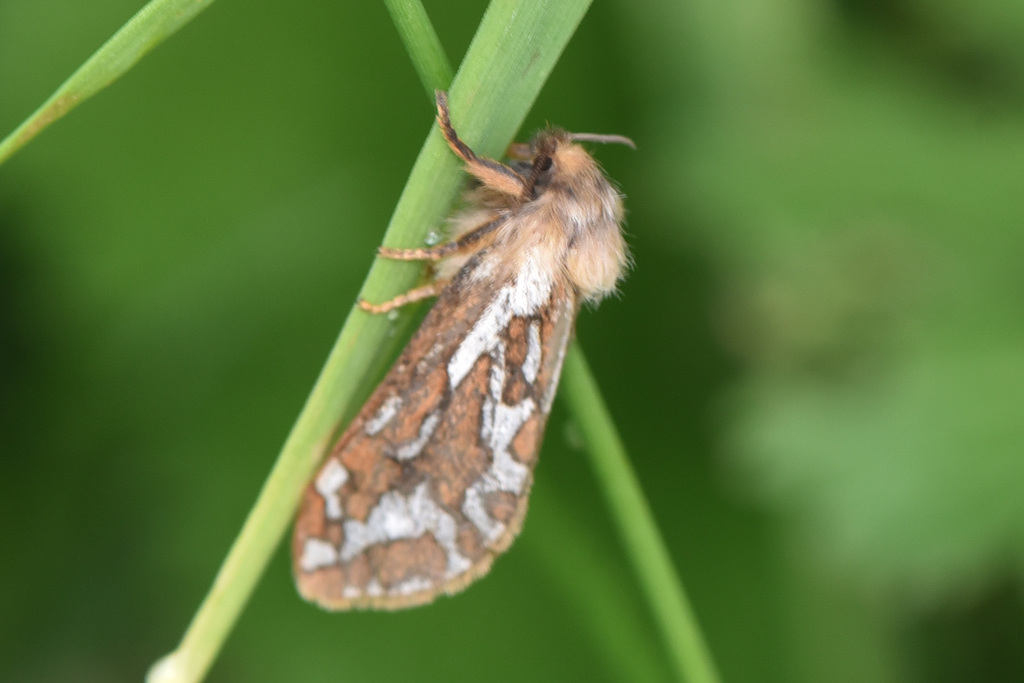

Scientific classification
- Domain: Eukaryota
- Kingdom: Animalia
- Phylum: Arthropoda
- Class: Insecta
- Order: Lepidoptera
- Family: Hepialidae
- Genus: Gazoryctra
- Species: G. confusus

Binomial name
- Gazoryctra confusus (Edwards, [1885])

Synonyms
- Hepialus confusus Edwards, [1885]; Gazoryctra confusa

= Gazoryctra confusus =

Species of moth

Gazoryctra confusus is a moth of the family Hepialidae. It is known from the United States.
