= Thitarodes baqingensis =

Scientific classification
- Domain: Eukaryota
- Kingdom: Animalia
- Phylum: Arthropoda
- Class: Insecta
- Order: Lepidoptera
- Family: Hepialidae
- Genus: Thitarodes
- Species: T. baqingensis

Binomial name
- Thitarodes baqingensis (Yang & Jiang, 1995)

Synonyms
- Hepialus baqingensis Yang & Jiang, 1995

Species of moth

Thitarodes baqingensis is a species of moth of the family Hepialidae. It was described by Yang and Jiang in 1995, and is known from the Tibet Autonomous Region of China.
