= Thitarodes sinarabesca =

Scientific classification
- Kingdom: Animalia
- Phylum: Arthropoda
- Class: Insecta
- Order: Lepidoptera
- Family: Hepialidae
- Genus: Thitarodes
- Species: T. sinarabesca

Binomial name
- Thitarodes sinarabesca (Bryk, 1946)

Synonyms
- Hepialus sinarabesca Bryk, 1946

Species of moth

Thitarodes sinarabesca is a species of moth of the family Hepialidae. It was described by Felix Bryk in 1946, and is known from China.
