= Thitarodes richthofeni =

Scientific classification
- Domain: Eukaryota
- Kingdom: Animalia
- Phylum: Arthropoda
- Class: Insecta
- Order: Lepidoptera
- Family: Hepialidae
- Genus: Thitarodes
- Species: T. richthofeni

Binomial name
- Thitarodes richthofeni (O. Bang-Haas, 1939)

Synonyms
- Hepialus richthofeni O. Bang-Haas, 1939

Species of moth

Thitarodes richthofeni is a species of moth of the family Hepialidae. It was described by Otto Bang-Haas in 1939, and is known from China.
