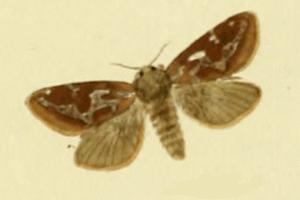
- Gazoryctra ganna

Scientific classification
- Domain: Eukaryota
- Kingdom: Animalia
- Phylum: Arthropoda
- Class: Insecta
- Order: Lepidoptera
- Family: Hepialidae
- Genus: Gazoryctra; Hübner, 1821

Species
- See text.

Synonyms
- Garzorycta Hubner, [1826]; Gazoryctes Kirby, 1892

= Gazoryctra =

Genus of moths

Gazoryctra is a genus of moths of the family Hepialidae. There are 14 described species found in Eurasia, Canada and the United States.

== Species ==
- Gazoryctra chishimana – Kuril Islands
- Gazoryctra confusus – United States
- Gazoryctra fuscoargenteus – northern Eurasia
- Gazoryctra ganna – Europe
- Gazoryctra hyperboreus – Canada
- Gazoryctra lembertii – United States
- Gazoryctra macilentus – Siberia
- Gazoryctra mathewi – United States
- Gazoryctra mcglashani – United States
- Gazoryctra novigannus – Canada
- Gazoryctra pulcher – United States
- Gazoryctra roseicaput – Canada
- Gazoryctra sciophanes – United States
- Gazoryctra wielgusi – United States
