= Thitarodes jialangensis =

Scientific classification
- Domain: Eukaryota
- Kingdom: Animalia
- Phylum: Arthropoda
- Class: Insecta
- Order: Lepidoptera
- Family: Hepialidae
- Genus: Thitarodes
- Species: T. jialangensis

Binomial name
- Thitarodes jialangensis (Yang, 1994)

Synonyms
- Hepialus jialangensis Yang, 1994

Species of moth

Thitarodes jialangensis is a species of moth of the family Hepialidae. It was described by Yang in 1994, and is known from the Tibet Autonomous Region in China.
