= Thitarodes dinggyeensis =

Scientific classification
- Kingdom: Animalia
- Phylum: Arthropoda
- Clade: Pancrustacea
- Class: Insecta
- Order: Lepidoptera
- Family: Hepialidae
- Genus: Thitarodes
- Species: T. dinggyeensis

Binomial name
- Thitarodes dinggyeensis (Chu & Wang, 2004)

Synonyms
- Hepialus dinggyeensis Chu & Wang, 2004

Species of moth

Thitarodes dinggyeensis is a species of moth of the family Hepialidae. It is found in China.
