= Ahamus maquensis =

Scientific classification
- Domain: Eukaryota
- Kingdom: Animalia
- Phylum: Arthropoda
- Class: Insecta
- Order: Lepidoptera
- Family: Hepialidae
- Genus: Ahamus
- Species: A. maquensis

Binomial name
- Ahamus maquensis (H.F Chu & L.Y. Wang, 2004)

Synonyms
- Hepialus maquensis H.F. Chu & L.Y. Wang, 2004

Species of moth

Ahamus maquensis is a species of moth of the family Hepialidae. It is found in China.
