= Thitarodes dierli =

Scientific classification
- Kingdom: Animalia
- Phylum: Arthropoda
- Class: Insecta
- Order: Lepidoptera
- Family: Hepialidae
- Genus: Thitarodes
- Species: T. dierli

Binomial name
- Thitarodes dierli Viette, 1968

Species of moth

Thitarodes dierli is a species of moth of the family Hepialidae. It was described by Pierre Viette in 1968, and is known from Nepal.
