= Thitarodes gonggaensis =

Scientific classification
- Domain: Eukaryota
- Kingdom: Animalia
- Phylum: Arthropoda
- Class: Insecta
- Order: Lepidoptera
- Family: Hepialidae
- Genus: Thitarodes
- Species: T. gonggaensis

Binomial name
- Thitarodes gonggaensis (Fu & Huang, 1991)

Synonyms
- Hepialus gonggaensis Fu & Huang, 1991

Species of moth

Thitarodes gonggaensis is a species of moth of the family Hepialidae. It was described by Fu and Huang in 1991, and is known from Sichuan, China.
