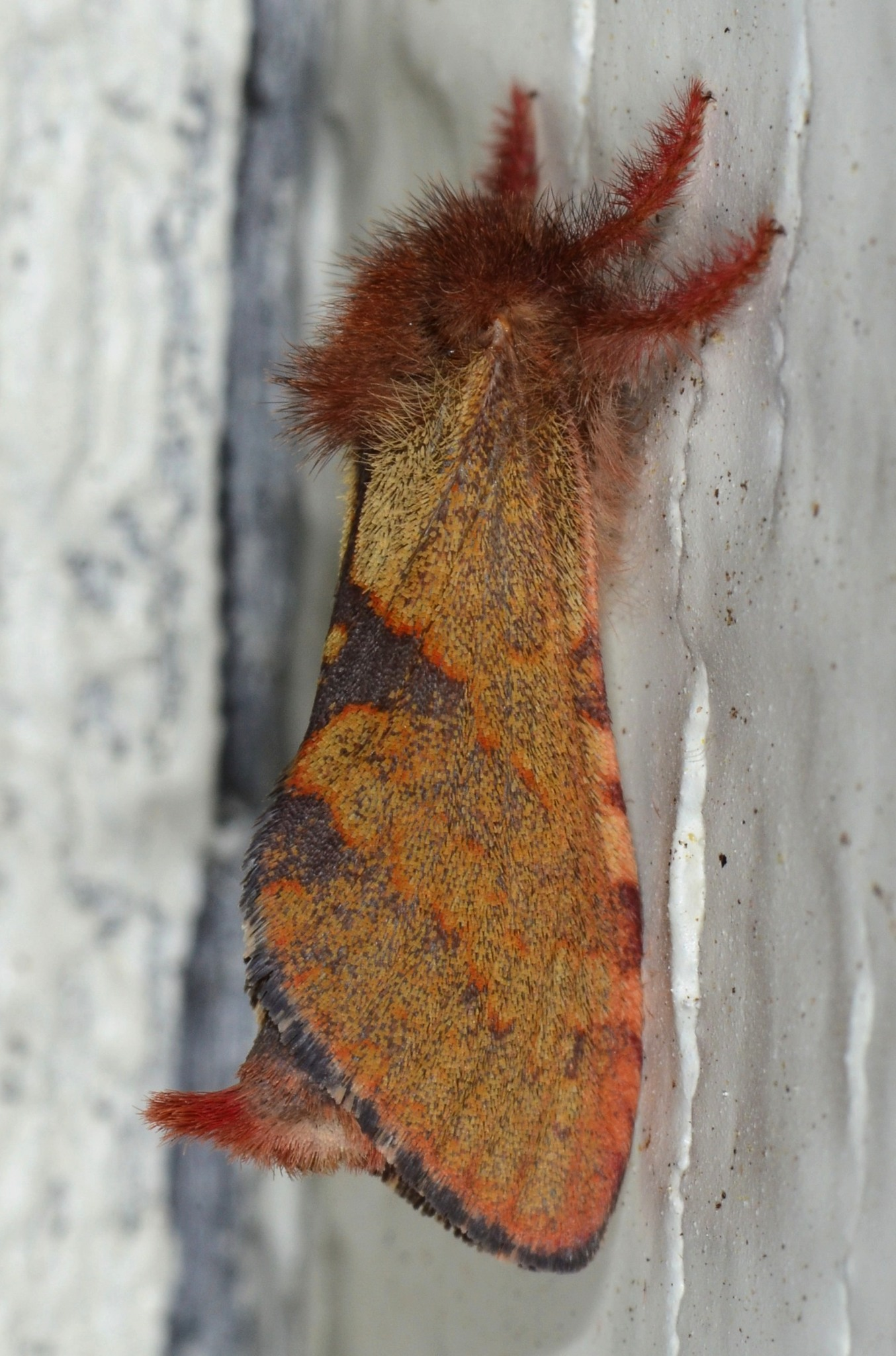

Scientific classification
- Domain: Eukaryota
- Kingdom: Animalia
- Phylum: Arthropoda
- Class: Insecta
- Order: Lepidoptera
- Family: Hepialidae
- Genus: Phymatopus
- Species: P. hectoides

Binomial name
- Phymatopus hectoides (Boisduval, 1868)

Synonyms
- List: Hepialus hectoides Boisduval, 1868; Epialus modestus Edwards, 1873; Hepialus lenzi Behrens, 1876; Hepialus sangaris Strecker, [1878]; Hepialus inutilis Edwards, 1881

= Phymatopus hectoides =

Species of moth

Phymatopus hectoides is a species of moth belonging to the family Hepialidae. It was described by Jean Baptiste Boisduval in 1868, and is known from the western United States, including California, Arizona, Nevada and Oregon.

The wingspan is about 27 mm. Adults are on wing from May to July.

The larvae feed on Baccharis, Horkelia, Lupinus, Helenium, Eriophyllum, Scrophularia and fern species. They bore in the shoots and roots of their host plant.
