= Ahamus yushuensis =

Scientific classification
- Domain: Eukaryota
- Kingdom: Animalia
- Phylum: Arthropoda
- Class: Insecta
- Order: Lepidoptera
- Family: Hepialidae
- Genus: Ahamus
- Species: A. yushuensis

Binomial name
- Ahamus yushuensis (H.F Zhu & L.Y. Wang, 1985)

Synonyms
- Hepialus yushuensis H.F. Chu & L.Y. Wang, 1985; Thitarodes yushuensis

Species of moth

Ahamus yushuensis is a species of moth of the family Hepialidae. It is found in China.
