= Thitarodes zaliensis =

Scientific classification
- Domain: Eukaryota
- Kingdom: Animalia
- Phylum: Arthropoda
- Class: Insecta
- Order: Lepidoptera
- Family: Hepialidae
- Genus: Thitarodes
- Species: T. zaliensis

Binomial name
- Thitarodes zaliensis (Yang, 1994)

Synonyms
- Hepialus zaliensis Yang, 1994

Species of moth

Thitarodes zaliensis is a species of moth of the family Hepialidae. It was described by Yang in 1994, and is known from the Tibet Autonomous Region in China.
