= Ahamus yunnanensis =

Scientific classification
- Domain: Eukaryota
- Kingdom: Animalia
- Phylum: Arthropoda
- Class: Insecta
- Order: Lepidoptera
- Family: Hepialidae
- Genus: Ahamus
- Species: A. yunnanensis

Binomial name
- Ahamus yunnanensis (D.R. Yang, C.D. Li & C. Shen, 1992)

Synonyms
- Hepialus yunnanensis D.R. Yang, C.D. Li & C. Shen, 1992; Thitarodes yunnanensis

Species of moth

Ahamus yunnanensis is a species of moth of the family Hepialidae. It was described by D.R. Yang, C.D. Li and C. Shen in 1992, and is known from Yunnan, China, from which its species epithet is derived.
