= Ahamus lijiangensis =

Scientific classification
- Kingdom: Animalia
- Phylum: Arthropoda
- Class: Insecta
- Order: Lepidoptera
- Family: Hepialidae
- Genus: Ahamus
- Species: A. lijiangensis

Binomial name
- Ahamus lijiangensis (Chu & Wang, 1985)

Synonyms
- Hepialus lijiangensis Chu and Wang, 1985; Thitarodes lijiangensis

Species of moth

Ahamus lijiangensis is a species of moth of the family Hepialidae. It was described by Hong-Fu Chu and Lin-Yao Wang in 1985 and is known from Yunnan, China.

Ahamus lijiangensis is one of 14 species in the genus Ahamus.

A recent paper has found that the superfamily Hepialoidea, of which A. lijiangensis is part, may be the only members of Infraorder Exoporia vulnerable to hosting the parasitic fungus Cordyceps and allied genera.
