= Ahamus jianchuanensis =

Scientific classification
- Domain: Eukaryota
- Kingdom: Animalia
- Phylum: Arthropoda
- Class: Insecta
- Order: Lepidoptera
- Family: Hepialidae
- Genus: Ahamus
- Species: A. jianchuanensis

Binomial name
- Ahamus jianchuanensis (Yang, 1994)

Synonyms
- Hepialus jianchuanensis Yang, 1994; Thitarodes jianchuanensis

Species of moth

Ahamus jianchuanensis is a species of moth of the family Hepialidae. It was described by Yang in 1994, and is known from Yunnan, China.
