= Mesosome =

Structures in bacteria

Mesosomes form in bacterial cells prepared for electron microscopy by chemical fixation, but not by freeze-fracture fixation.

Mesosomes or chondrioids are folded invaginations in the plasma membrane of bacteria that are produced by the chemical fixation techniques used to prepare samples for electron microscopy. Although several functions were proposed for these structures in the 1960s, they were recognized as artifacts by the late 1970s and are no longer considered to be part of the normal structure of bacterial cells. These extensions are in the form of vesicles, tubules and lamellae.

== Initial observations ==
These structures are invaginations of the plasma membrane observed in gram-positive bacteria that have been chemically fixed to prepare them for electron microscopy. They were first observed in 1953 by George B. Chapman and James Hillier, who referred to them as "peripheral bodies." They were termed "mesosomes" by Fitz-James in 1960.

Initially, it was thought that mesosomes might play a role in several cellular processes, such as cell wall formation during cell division, chromosome replication, or as a site for oxidative phosphorylation. The mesosome was thought to increase the surface area of the cell, aiding the cell in cellular respiration. This is analogous to cristae in the mitochondrion in eukaryotic cells, which are finger-like projections and help eukaryotic cells undergo cellular respiration. Mesosomes were also hypothesized to aid in photosynthesis, cell division, DNA replication, and cell compartmentalisation.

== Disproof of hypothesis ==
These models were called into question during the late 1970s when data accumulated suggesting that mesosomes are artifacts formed through damage to the membrane during the process of chemical fixation, and do not occur in cells that have not been chemically fixed. By the mid to late 1980s, with advances in cryofixation and freeze substitution methods for electron microscopy, it was generally concluded that mesosomes do not exist in living cells. However, a few researchers continue to argue that the evidence remains inconclusive, and that mesosomes might not be artifacts in all cases.

Recently, similar folds in the membrane have been observed in bacteria that have been exposed to some classes of antibiotics, and antibacterial peptides (defensins). The appearance of these mesosome-like structures may be the result of these chemicals damaging the plasma membrane and/or cell wall.

The case of the proposal and then disproof of the mesosome hypothesis has been discussed from the viewpoint of the philosophy of science as an example of how a scientific idea can be falsified and the hypothesis then rejected, and analyzed to explore how the scientific community carries out this testing process.

== See also ==
- Cell membrane
- Organelle
- Lysosome
