= Thitarodes latitegumenus =

Scientific classification
- Kingdom: Animalia
- Phylum: Arthropoda
- Clade: Pancrustacea
- Class: Insecta
- Order: Lepidoptera
- Family: Hepialidae
- Genus: Thitarodes
- Species: T. latitegumenus

Binomial name
- Thitarodes latitegumenus (F.R. Shen & Y.S. Zhou, 1997)

Synonyms
- Hepialus latitegumenus F.R. Shen & Y.S. Zhou, 1997

Species of moth

Thitarodes latitegumenus is a species of moth of the family Hepialidae. It is found in Yunnan, China.

The wingspan is 30.5 mm (1.20 in) for the holotype (a male) and 35 mm (1.4 in) for the allotype (a female).
