= Ahamus menyuanicus =

Scientific classification
- Domain: Eukaryota
- Kingdom: Animalia
- Phylum: Arthropoda
- Class: Insecta
- Order: Lepidoptera
- Family: Hepialidae
- Genus: Ahamus
- Species: A. menyuanicus

Binomial name
- Ahamus menyuanicus (Chu & Wang, 1985)

Synonyms
- Hepialus menyuanicus Chu & Wang, 1985; Thitarodes menyuanicus

Species of moth

Ahamus menyuanicus is a species of moth of the family Hepialidae. It was described by Hong-Fu Chu and Lin-Yao Wang in 1985 and is known from Qinghai, China.
