= Ahamus zhayuensis =

Scientific classification
- Domain: Eukaryota
- Kingdom: Animalia
- Phylum: Arthropoda
- Class: Insecta
- Order: Lepidoptera
- Family: Hepialidae
- Genus: Ahamus
- Species: A. zhayuensis

Binomial name
- Ahamus zhayuensis (Chu & Wang, 1985)

Synonyms
- Hepialus zhayuensis Chu & Wang, 1985; Thitarodes zhayuensis

Species of moth

Ahamus zhayuensis is a species of moth of the family Hepialidae. It was described by Hong-Fu Chu and Lin-Yao Wang in 1985 and is known from the Tibet Autonomous Region in China.
