= Thitarodes bibelteus =

Scientific classification
- Kingdom: Animalia
- Phylum: Arthropoda
- Clade: Pancrustacea
- Class: Insecta
- Order: Lepidoptera
- Family: Hepialidae
- Genus: Thitarodes
- Species: T. bibelteus

Binomial name
- Thitarodes bibelteus (F.R. Shen & Y.S. Zhou, 1997)

Synonyms
- Hepialus bibelteus F.R. Shen & Y.S. Zhou, 1997

Species of moth

Thitarodes bibelteus is a species of moth of the family Hepialidae. It is found in Yunnan, China.

The wingspan is 30.5 mm (1.20 in) for the holotype (a male) and 40.5 mm (1.59 in) for the allotype (a female).
