= Thitarodes deqinensis =

Scientific classification
- Domain: Eukaryota
- Kingdom: Animalia
- Phylum: Arthropoda
- Class: Insecta
- Order: Lepidoptera
- Family: Hepialidae
- Genus: Thitarodes
- Species: T. deqinensis

Binomial name
- Thitarodes deqinensis (Liang, 1988)

Synonyms
- Hepialus deqinensis X.C. Liang, 1988; Thitarodes deqingensis; Hepialus deqingensis

Species of moth

Thitarodes deqinensis is a species of moth of the family Hepialidae. It is found in Yunnan, China.
