= Thitarodes biruensis =

Scientific classification
- Kingdom: Animalia
- Phylum: Arthropoda
- Class: Insecta
- Order: Lepidoptera
- Family: Hepialidae
- Genus: Thitarodes
- Species: T. biruensis

Binomial name
- Thitarodes biruensis (S.Q. Fu, 2002)

Synonyms
- Hepialus biruensis S.Q. Fu, 2002

Species of moth

Thitarodes biruensis is a species of moth of the family Hepialidae. It is found in Xizang, China.
