= Gazoryctra macilentus =

Scientific classification
- Kingdom: Animalia
- Phylum: Arthropoda
- Clade: Pancrustacea
- Class: Insecta
- Order: Lepidoptera
- Family: Hepialidae
- Genus: Gazoryctra
- Species: G. macilentus

Binomial name
- Gazoryctra macilentus (Eversmann, 1851)

Synonyms
- Hepialus macilentus Eversmann, 1851; Ahamus macilentus; Hepialus gerda Staudinger, 1898; Gazoryctra macilenata Tshistjakov, 1997; Gazoryctra spinifera Tshistjakov, 1997

Species of moth

Gazoryctra macilentus is a moth of the family Hepialidae. It is known from Siberia, the Russian Far East, Japan, Kazakhstan and Mongolia.
