= Ahamus anomopterus =

Scientific classification
- Kingdom: Animalia
- Phylum: Arthropoda
- Clade: Pancrustacea
- Class: Insecta
- Order: Lepidoptera
- Family: Hepialidae
- Genus: Ahamus
- Species: A. anomopterus

Binomial name
- Ahamus anomopterus (D.R. Yang, 1994)

Synonyms
- Hepialus anomopterus Yang, 1994; Thitarodes anomopterus

Species of moth

Ahamus anomopterus is a species of moth in the family Hepialidae. It was described by D.R. Yang in 1994 and is known from Yunnan, China.
