= Thitarodes pui =

Scientific classification
- Domain: Eukaryota
- Kingdom: Animalia
- Phylum: Arthropoda
- Class: Insecta
- Order: Lepidoptera
- Family: Hepialidae
- Genus: Thitarodes
- Species: T. pui

Binomial name
- Thitarodes pui (G.R. Zhang, D.X. Gu & X. Liu, 2007)

Synonyms
- Hepialus pui G.R. Zhang, D.X. Gu & X. Liu, 2007

Species of moth

Thitarodes pui is a species of moth of the family Hepialidae. It is found in Tibet, China.
