= Thitarodes baimaensis =

Scientific classification
- Domain: Eukaryota
- Kingdom: Animalia
- Phylum: Arthropoda
- Class: Insecta
- Order: Lepidoptera
- Family: Hepialidae
- Genus: Thitarodes
- Species: T. baimaensis

Binomial name
- Thitarodes baimaensis (Liang, 1988)

Synonyms
- Hepialus baimaensis Liang, 1988

Species of moth

Thitarodes baimaensis is a species of moth of the family Hepialidae. It was described by Liang in 1988, and is known from Yunnan, China.
