= Ahamus luquensis =

Scientific classification
- Kingdom: Animalia
- Phylum: Arthropoda
- Clade: Pancrustacea
- Class: Insecta
- Order: Lepidoptera
- Family: Hepialidae
- Genus: Ahamus
- Species: A. luquensis

Binomial name
- Ahamus luquensis (D.R. Yang, 1995)

Synonyms
- Hepialus luquensis Yang and Yang in Yang et al., 1995; Thitarodes luquensis

Species of moth

Ahamus luquensis is a species of moth of the family Hepialidae. It was described by D.R. Yang in 1995, and is known from Gansu, China.
