= Ahamus yulongensis =

Scientific classification
- Domain: Eukaryota
- Kingdom: Animalia
- Phylum: Arthropoda
- Class: Insecta
- Order: Lepidoptera
- Family: Hepialidae
- Genus: Ahamus
- Species: A. yulongensis

Binomial name
- Ahamus yulongensis (Liang et al., 1988)

Synonyms
- Hepialus yulongensis Liang et al., 1988; Thitarodes yulongensis

Species of moth

Ahamus yulongensis is a species of moth of the family Hepialidae. It was described by Liang et al. in 1988, and is known from Yunnan, China.
