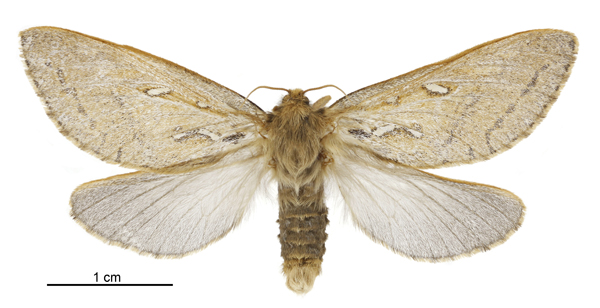

Scientific classification
- Kingdom: Animalia
- Phylum: Arthropoda
- Class: Insecta
- Order: Lepidoptera
- Family: Hepialidae
- Genus: Dioxycanus
- Species: D. fusca

Binomial name
- Dioxycanus fusca (Philpott, 1914)

Synonyms
- Porina fusca Philpott, 1914

= Dioxycanus fusca =

Species of moth

Dioxycanus fusca is a species of moth of the family Hepialidae. It is endemic to New Zealand. This species was first described by Alfred Philpott in 1914 as Porina fusca using specimens collected by C. Fenwick and M. O. Pasco. In 1966 L. J. Dumbleton reviewed New Zealand Hepialinae and placed this species within the genus Dioxycanus, giving it the new combination Dioxycanus fuscus.

The wingspan is 26–33 mm for males and about 38 mm for females. Adults are on wing from December to February. This species can be found in the South Island in western Southland and Otago up to approximately 900 meters. D. fusca can be distinguished from D. oreas by its dark antennae.

Larvae have been found amongst short Poa tussocks, living in shafts in the soil.
