= Phassus absyrtus =

Scientific classification
- Domain: Eukaryota
- Kingdom: Animalia
- Phylum: Arthropoda
- Class: Insecta
- Order: Lepidoptera
- Family: Hepialidae
- Genus: Phassus
- Species: P. absyrtus

Binomial name
- Phassus absyrtus Schaus, 1892

Species of moth

Phassus absyrtus is a moth of the family Hepialidae. It is known from Brazil.
