= Phassus basirei =

Scientific classification
- Domain: Eukaryota
- Kingdom: Animalia
- Phylum: Arthropoda
- Class: Insecta
- Order: Lepidoptera
- Family: Hepialidae
- Genus: Phassus
- Species: P. basirei

Binomial name
- Phassus basirei Schaus, 1890

Species of moth

Phassus basirei is a moth of the family Hepialidae. It is known from Mexico.
