= Druceiella basirubra =

Scientific classification
- Domain: Eukaryota
- Kingdom: Animalia
- Phylum: Arthropoda
- Class: Insecta
- Order: Lepidoptera
- Family: Hepialidae
- Genus: Druceiella
- Species: D. basirubra

Binomial name
- Druceiella basirubra (Schaus, 1901)

Synonyms
- Dalaca basirubra Schaus, 1901; Pseudophassus songoensis Pfitzner, 1914

Species of moth

Druceiella basirubra is a species of moth of the family Hepialidae. It was described by William Schaus in 1901 and is known from Bolivia and Peru.

The wingspan is about 80 mm. The forewings are dark grey, the space between the subcostal and median area shaded with dark ochreous brown. There are some small golden yellow spots, as well as an outer, subterminal and marginal row of dark ochreous brown spots. The hindwings are light brown with long reddish hairs at the base.
