= Hepialiscus nepalensis =

Scientific classification
- Kingdom: Animalia
- Phylum: Arthropoda
- Class: Insecta
- Order: Lepidoptera
- Family: Hepialidae
- Genus: Hepialiscus
- Species: H. nepalensis

Binomial name
- Hepialiscus nepalensis (Walker, 1856)

Synonyms
- Hepialus nepalensis Walker, 1856; Hepialus indicus Walker, 1856; Hepialus pauperatus Walker, 1865; Hepialus marcidus Butler, 1880; Hepialiscus flavus Chu and Wang, 1985

Species of moth

Hepialiscus nepalensis is a moth of the family Hepialidae. It is found in Nepal, India and China (Xizang).
