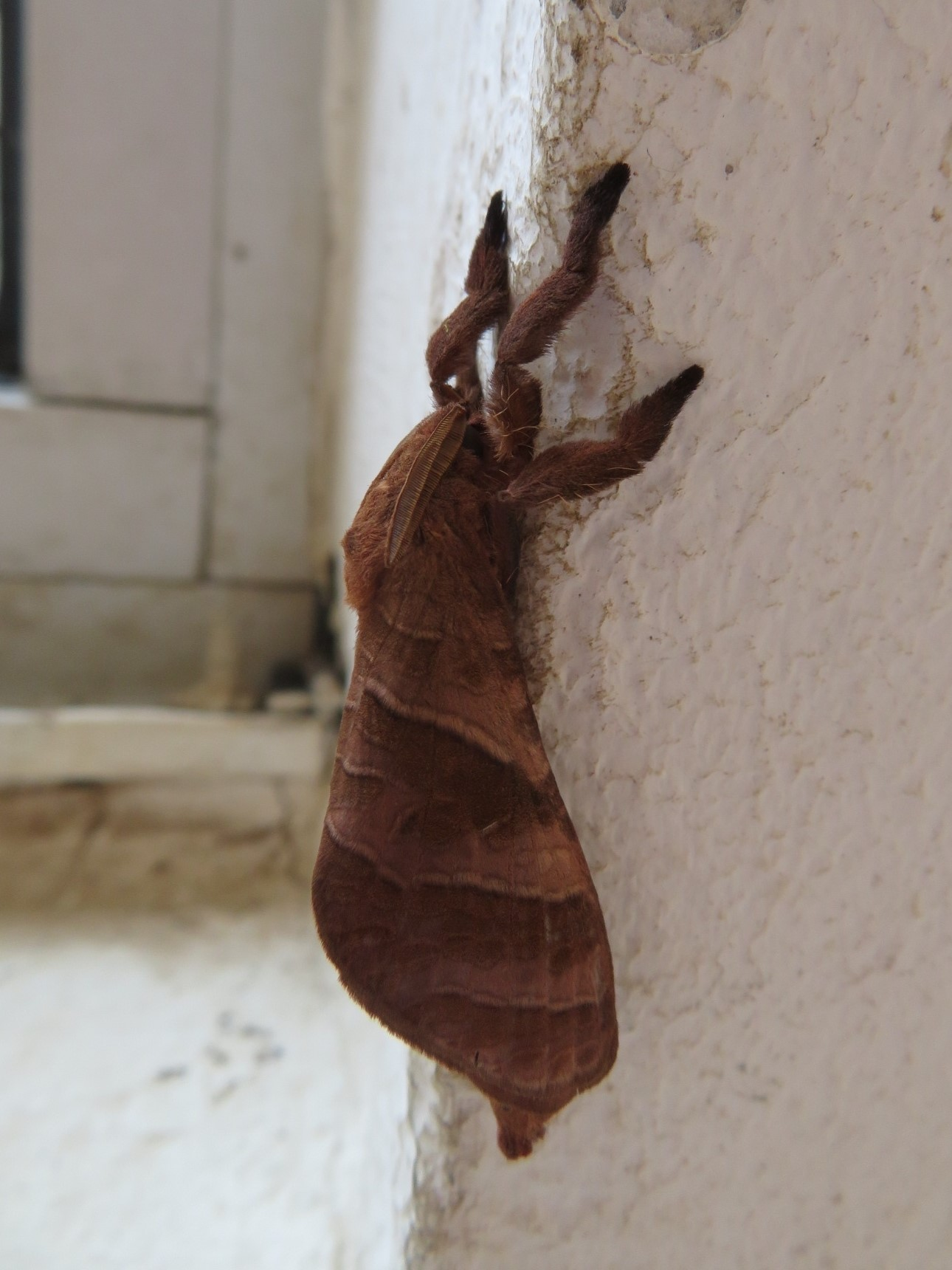

Scientific classification
- Kingdom: Animalia
- Phylum: Arthropoda
- Clade: Pancrustacea
- Class: Insecta
- Order: Lepidoptera
- Family: Hepialidae
- Genus: Wallacella; Mielke et al., 2020
- Species: W. guianensis

Binomial name
- Wallacella guianensis (Schaus, 1940)

Synonyms
- (Species): Phassus guianensis Schaus, 1940

= Wallacella =

Species of moth

Wallacella is a genus of moths in the family Hepialidae. It is monotypic, being represented by the single species Wallacella guianensis which is known from Guyana.
