= Pfitzneriella similis =

Scientific classification
- Domain: Eukaryota
- Kingdom: Animalia
- Phylum: Arthropoda
- Class: Insecta
- Order: Lepidoptera
- Family: Hepialidae
- Genus: Pfitzneriella
- Species: P. similis

Binomial name
- Pfitzneriella similis (Zukowsky, 1954)

Synonyms
- Triodia similis Zukowsky, 1954

Species of moth

Pfitzneriella similis is a moth of the family Hepialidae. It is found in Peru.
