= Parapielus heimlichi =

Scientific classification
- Kingdom: Animalia
- Phylum: Arthropoda
- Class: Insecta
- Order: Lepidoptera
- Family: Hepialidae
- Genus: Parapielus
- Species: P. heimlichi

Binomial name
- Parapielus heimlichi (Ureta, 1956)

Synonyms
- Hepialus heimlichi Ureta, 1956

Species of moth

Parapielus heimlichi is a moth of the family Hepialidae. It is found in Chile.
