= Aplatissa strangoides =

Scientific classification
- Kingdom: Animalia
- Phylum: Arthropoda
- Class: Insecta
- Order: Lepidoptera
- Family: Hepialidae
- Genus: Aplatissa
- Species: A. strangoides

Binomial name
- Aplatissa strangoides Viette, 1953

Species of moth

Aplatissa strangoides is a species of moth of the family Hepialidae. It is endemic to Brazil.
