= Aplatissa michaelis =

Scientific classification
- Domain: Eukaryota
- Kingdom: Animalia
- Phylum: Arthropoda
- Class: Insecta
- Order: Lepidoptera
- Family: Hepialidae
- Genus: Aplatissa
- Species: A. michaelis

Binomial name
- Aplatissa michaelis (Pfitzner, 1914)

Synonyms
- Dalaca michaelis Pfitzner, 1914; Aplatissa michaeli Pfitzner, 1937

Species of moth

Aplatissa michaelis is a species of moth of the family Hepialidae. It is endemic to Brazil.
