= Phassus championi =

Scientific classification
- Domain: Eukaryota
- Kingdom: Animalia
- Phylum: Arthropoda
- Class: Insecta
- Order: Lepidoptera
- Family: Hepialidae
- Genus: Phassus
- Species: P. championi

Binomial name
- Phassus championi H. Druce, 1887

Species of moth

Phassus championi is a moth of the family Hepialidae first described by Herbert Druce in 1887. It is known from Guatemala.
