= Antihepialus vansoni =

Scientific classification
- Domain: Eukaryota
- Kingdom: Animalia
- Phylum: Arthropoda
- Class: Insecta
- Order: Lepidoptera
- Family: Hepialidae
- Genus: Antihepialus
- Species: A. vansoni

Binomial name
- Antihepialus vansoni (Janse, 1942)

Synonyms
- Dalaca vansoni Janse, 1942

Species of moth

Antihepialus vansoni is a species of moth of the family Hepialidae. It is known from South Africa.
