= Elhamma diakonoffi =

Scientific classification
- Kingdom: Animalia
- Phylum: Arthropoda
- Class: Insecta
- Order: Lepidoptera
- Family: Hepialidae
- Genus: Elhamma
- Species: E. diakonoffi

Binomial name
- Elhamma diakonoffi (Viette, 1952)

Synonyms
- Theaxieus diakonoffi Viette, 1952

Species of moth

Elhamma diakonoffi is a species of moth of the family Hepialidae. It is known from New Guinea.
