= Parapielus luteicornis =

Scientific classification
- Domain: Eukaryota
- Kingdom: Animalia
- Phylum: Arthropoda
- Class: Insecta
- Order: Lepidoptera
- Family: Hepialidae
- Genus: Parapielus
- Species: P. luteicornis

Binomial name
- Parapielus luteicornis (Berg, 1882)

Synonyms
- Pielus luteicornis Berg, 1882; Pielus popperi Pfitzner, 1938

Species of moth

Parapielus luteicornis is a moth of the family Hepialidae. It is found in Argentina and Chile.
