= Phassus transversus =

Scientific classification
- Kingdom: Animalia
- Phylum: Arthropoda
- Class: Insecta
- Order: Lepidoptera
- Family: Hepialidae
- Genus: Phassus
- Species: P. transversus

Binomial name
- Phassus transversus Walker, 1856

Species of moth

Phassus transversus is a moth of the family Hepialidae. It is known from Brazil.
