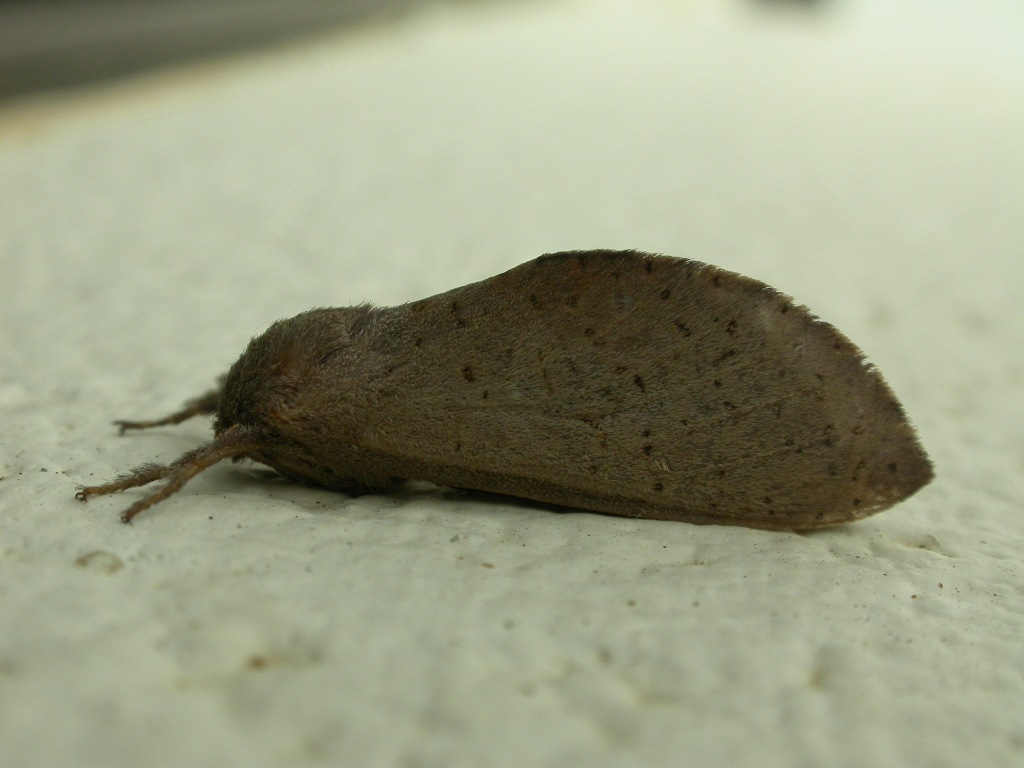

Scientific classification
- Kingdom: Animalia
- Phylum: Arthropoda
- Class: Insecta
- Order: Lepidoptera
- Family: Hepialidae
- Genus: Elhamma
- Species: E. australasiae

Binomial name
- Elhamma australasiae (Walker, 1856)

Synonyms
- Hepialus australasiae Walker, 1856; Porina banghaasii Pfitzner, 1914; Elhamma inconcluso Walker, 1856

= Elhamma australasiae =

Species of moth

Elhamma australasiae is a moth of the family Hepialidae. It is found along the eastern seaboard of Australia.

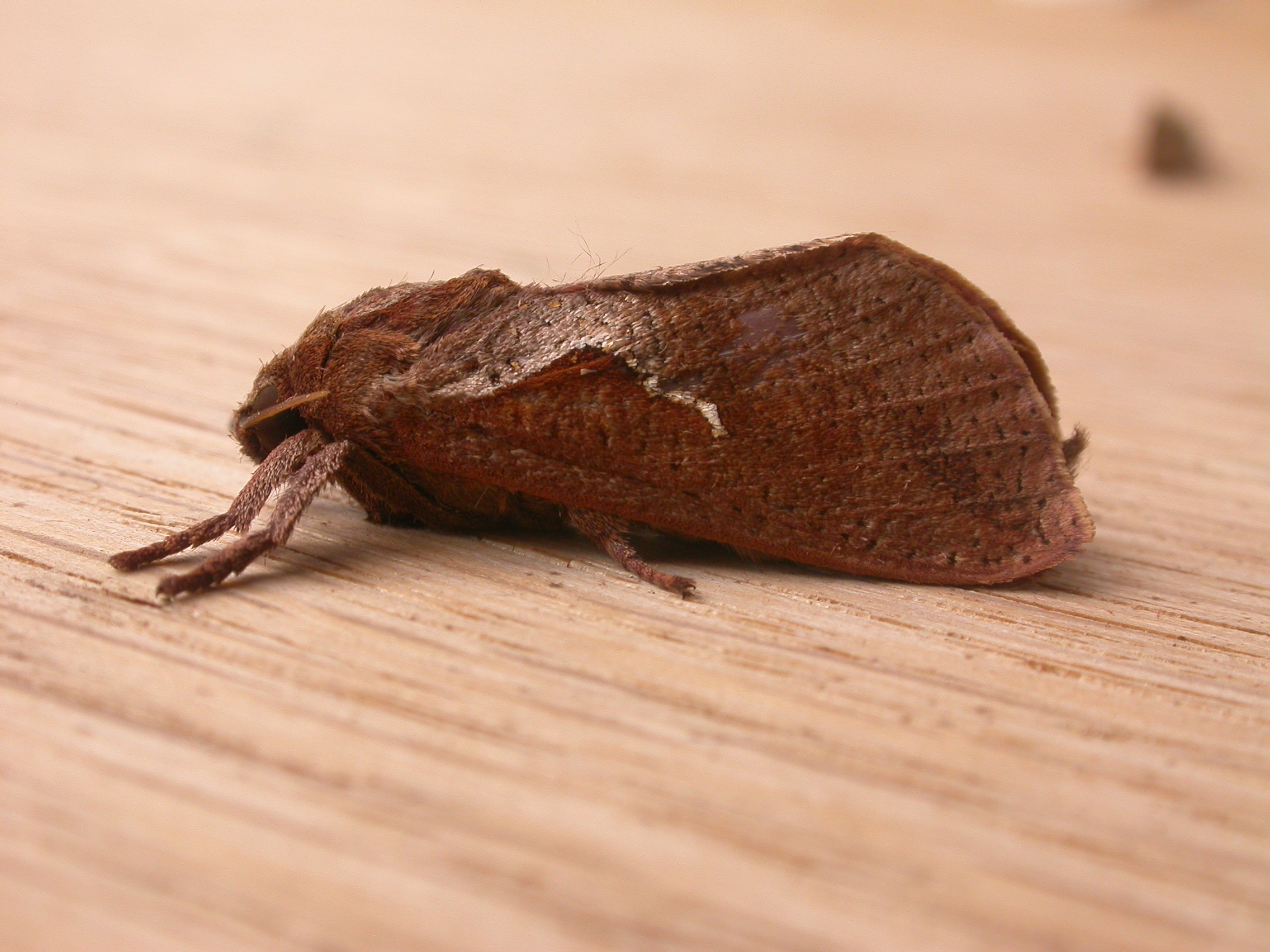

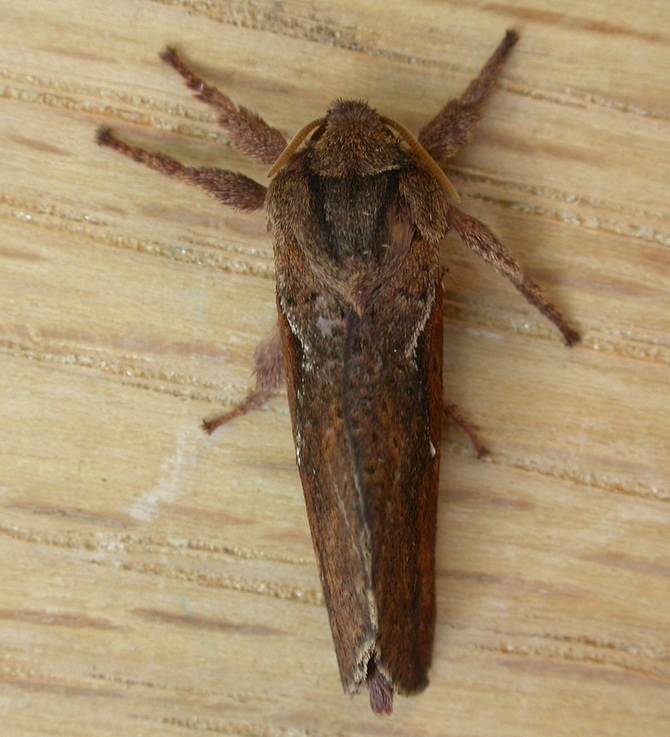

== Description ==
Adults of E. australasiae can be recognised by a small, sharp tuft of piliform (hairlike) scales protruding horizontally from the base of the antennal scape over the eye. Females (forewing length 18.9–38.8 mm) are larger than males (12.7–20.8 mm), and have forewings that are longer and narrower.

The adult moths are mostly brown save for the hindwings and the basal part of the abdomen, which are salmon pink. However, these colours fade rapidly after death. The forewings have scattered dark flecks and, in males, a silvery-white streak.

When females lay eggs, the initial eggs are white in colour. Later eggs are brown and then black.

Larvae are initially buff (light brownish yellow) with brown heads, then become dark brown all over.

Pupae are about 40 mm long and 6 mm in diameter. They are pale brown with darker chitinizations at the anterior end, and each segment has two dorsal rows and one ventral row of tiny serrations. When ready to emerge, the colours of the adult are visible.

== Biology ==
Little is known about the biology of this species. Larvae are suspected to feed on roots of grasses. Adults fly from early January to early May, being most common in February and March.
