= Parapielus oberthuri =

Scientific classification
- Kingdom: Animalia
- Phylum: Arthropoda
- Class: Insecta
- Order: Lepidoptera
- Family: Hepialidae
- Genus: Parapielus
- Species: P. oberthuri

Binomial name
- Parapielus oberthuri (Viette, 1952)

Synonyms
- Lossbergiana oberthuri Viette, 1952

Species of moth

Parapielus oberthuri is a moth of the family Hepialidae. It is found in Chile.
