= Elhamma toxopeusi =

Scientific classification
- Kingdom: Animalia
- Phylum: Arthropoda
- Class: Insecta
- Order: Lepidoptera
- Family: Hepialidae
- Genus: Elhamma
- Species: E. toxopeusi

Binomial name
- Elhamma toxopeusi (Viette, 1952)

Synonyms
- Zauxieus toxopeusi Viette, 1952

Species of moth

Elhamma toxopeusi is a species of moth of the family Hepialidae. It is known from New Guinea.
