= Napialus hunanensis =

Scientific classification
- Domain: Eukaryota
- Kingdom: Animalia
- Phylum: Arthropoda
- Class: Insecta
- Order: Lepidoptera
- Family: Hepialidae
- Genus: Napialus
- Species: N. hunanensis

Binomial name
- Napialus hunanensis Chu and Wang, 1985

Species of moth

Napialus is a moth of the family Hepialidae. It is found in Hunan, China, from which its species epithet is derived.
