= Pfitzneriana prosopus =

Scientific classification
- Domain: Eukaryota
- Kingdom: Animalia
- Phylum: Arthropoda
- Class: Insecta
- Order: Lepidoptera
- Family: Hepialidae
- Genus: Pfitzneriana
- Species: P. prosopus

Binomial name
- Pfitzneriana prosopus (H. Druce, 1901)

Synonyms
- Hepialus prosopus H. Druce, 1901

Species of moth

Pfitzneriana prosopus is a moth of the family Hepialidae first described by Herbert Druce in 1901. It is found in Colombia.
