= Phassus marcius =

Scientific classification
- Domain: Eukaryota
- Kingdom: Animalia
- Phylum: Arthropoda
- Class: Insecta
- Order: Lepidoptera
- Family: Hepialidae
- Genus: Phassus
- Species: P. marcius

Binomial name
- Phassus marcius H. Druce, 1892

Species of moth

Phassus marcius is a moth of the family Hepialidae first described by Herbert Druce in 1892. It is known from Mexico.
