= Pfitzneriana allura =

Scientific classification
- Kingdom: Animalia
- Phylum: Arthropoda
- Class: Insecta
- Order: Lepidoptera
- Family: Hepialidae
- Genus: Pfitzneriana
- Species: P. allura

Binomial name
- Pfitzneriana allura Viette, 1961

Species of moth

Pfitzneriana allura is a moth of the family Hepialidae. It is found in Bolivia.
