= Elhamma roepkei =

Scientific classification
- Kingdom: Animalia
- Phylum: Arthropoda
- Class: Insecta
- Order: Lepidoptera
- Family: Hepialidae
- Genus: Elhamma
- Species: E. roepkei

Binomial name
- Elhamma roepkei (Viette, 1952)

Synonyms
- Theaxieus roepkei Viette, 1952

Species of moth

Elhamma roepkei is a species of moth of the family Hepialidae. It is known from New Guinea.
