= Hepialiscus taiwanus =

Scientific classification
- Kingdom: Animalia
- Phylum: Arthropoda
- Class: Insecta
- Order: Lepidoptera
- Family: Hepialidae
- Genus: Hepialiscus
- Species: H. taiwanus

Binomial name
- Hepialiscus taiwanus Ueda, 1988

Species of moth

Hepialiscus taiwanus is a moth of the family Hepialidae. It is endemic to Taiwan.
