= Metahepialus plurimaculata =

Scientific classification
- Domain: Eukaryota
- Kingdom: Animalia
- Phylum: Arthropoda
- Class: Insecta
- Order: Lepidoptera
- Family: Hepialidae
- Genus: Metahepialus
- Species: M. plurimaculata

Binomial name
- Metahepialus plurimaculata (Warren, 1914)

Synonyms
- Gorgopis plurimaculata Warren, 1914

Species of moth

Metahepialus plurimaculata is a moth of the family Hepialidae. It is endemic to South Africa.
