= Pfitzneriella remota =

Scientific classification
- Domain: Eukaryota
- Kingdom: Animalia
- Phylum: Arthropoda
- Class: Insecta
- Order: Lepidoptera
- Family: Hepialidae
- Genus: Pfitzneriella
- Species: P. remota

Binomial name
- Pfitzneriella remota (Pfitzner, 1906)

Synonyms
- Hepialus remota Pfitzner, 1906

Species of moth

Pfitzneriella remota is a moth of the family Hepialidae. It is found in Peru.
