= Hepialiscus robinsoni =

Scientific classification
- Kingdom: Animalia
- Phylum: Arthropoda
- Class: Insecta
- Order: Lepidoptera
- Family: Hepialidae
- Genus: Hepialiscus
- Species: H. robinsoni

Binomial name
- Hepialiscus robinsoni Ueda, 1988

Species of moth

Hepialiscus robinsoni is a moth of the family Hepialidae. It is endemic to Taiwan.
