= Phassus pharus =

Scientific classification
- Domain: Eukaryota
- Kingdom: Animalia
- Phylum: Arthropoda
- Class: Insecta
- Order: Lepidoptera
- Family: Hepialidae
- Genus: Phassus
- Species: P. pharus

Binomial name
- Phassus pharus (H. Druce, 1887)

Synonyms
- Hepialus pharus H. Druce, 1887

Species of moth

Phassus pharus is a moth of the family Hepialidae first described by Herbert Druce in 1887. It is known from Guatemala. Food plants for this species include Malvaceae and grasses such as sugar cane.
