= Napialus chongqingensis =

Scientific classification
- Domain: Eukaryota
- Kingdom: Animalia
- Phylum: Arthropoda
- Class: Insecta
- Order: Lepidoptera
- Family: Hepialidae
- Genus: Napialus
- Species: N. chongqingensis

Binomial name
- Napialus chongqingensis Wu, 1992

Species of moth

Napialus chongqingensis is a moth of the family Hepialidae. It is found in Chongqing, China, from which its species epithet is derived.
