= Phassus tesselatus =

Scientific classification
- Domain: Eukaryota
- Kingdom: Animalia
- Phylum: Arthropoda
- Class: Insecta
- Order: Lepidoptera
- Family: Hepialidae
- Genus: Phassus
- Species: P. tesselatus

Binomial name
- Phassus tesselatus (Herrich-Schaffer, [1854])

Synonyms
- Epialus tesselatus Herrich-Schaffer, [1854]

Species of moth

Phassus tesselatus is a moth of the family Hepialidae. The type location is listed as New Holland.
