= Antihepialus antarcticus =

Scientific classification
- Kingdom: Animalia
- Phylum: Arthropoda
- Class: Insecta
- Order: Lepidoptera
- Family: Hepialidae
- Genus: Antihepialus
- Species: A. antarcticus

Binomial name
- Antihepialus antarcticus (Wallengren, 1860)

Synonyms
- Hepialus antarcticus Wallengren, 1860; Ptycholoma aurifaber Felder, 1874

Species of moth

Antihepialus antarcticus is a species of moth of the family Hepialidae. It is known from South Africa.
