= Pfitzneriella monticola =

Scientific classification
- Domain: Eukaryota
- Kingdom: Animalia
- Phylum: Arthropoda
- Class: Insecta
- Order: Lepidoptera
- Family: Hepialidae
- Genus: Pfitzneriella
- Species: P. monticola

Binomial name
- Pfitzneriella monticola (Maassen, 1890)

Synonyms
- Triodia monticola Maassen, 1890

Species of moth

Pfitzneriella monticola is a moth of the family Hepialidae. It is found in Ecuador.
