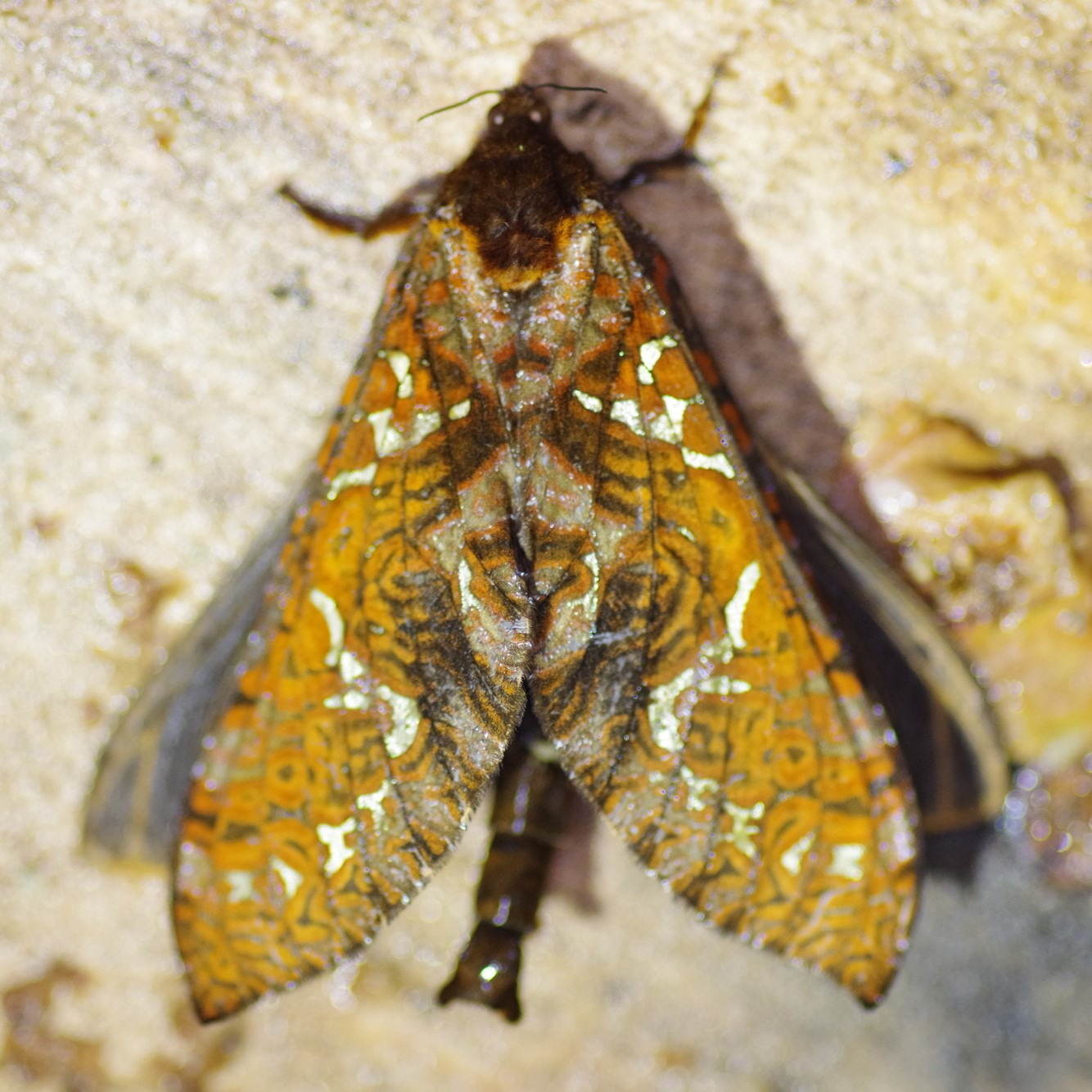

Scientific classification
- Kingdom: Animalia
- Phylum: Arthropoda
- Clade: Pancrustacea
- Class: Insecta
- Order: Lepidoptera
- Family: Hepialidae
- Genus: Phassus
- Species: P. aurigenus

Binomial name
- Phassus aurigenus Pfitzner, 1914

= Phassus aurigenus =

Species of moth

Phassus aurigenus is a species of moth in the family Hepialidae. It is known from Costa Rica.
