= Pfitzneriana olivescens =

Scientific classification
- Domain: Eukaryota
- Kingdom: Animalia
- Phylum: Arthropoda
- Class: Insecta
- Order: Lepidoptera
- Family: Hepialidae
- Genus: Pfitzneriana
- Species: P. olivescens

Binomial name
- Pfitzneriana olivescens (Pfitzner, 1914)

Synonyms
- Dalaca olivescens Pfitzner, 1914; Pfitzneriana boliviensis Viette, 1961

Species of moth

Pfitzneriana olivescens is a moth of the family Hepialidae. It is found in Colombia and Bolivia.
