= Parapielus reedi =

Scientific classification
- Kingdom: Animalia
- Phylum: Arthropoda
- Class: Insecta
- Order: Lepidoptera
- Family: Hepialidae
- Genus: Parapielus
- Species: P. reedi

Binomial name
- Parapielus reedi (Ureta, 1957)

Synonyms
- Hepialus reedi Ureta, 1957

Species of moth

Parapielus reedi is a moth of the family Hepialidae. It is found in Chile.
