= Phassus phalerus =

Scientific classification
- Domain: Eukaryota
- Kingdom: Animalia
- Phylum: Arthropoda
- Class: Insecta
- Order: Lepidoptera
- Family: Hepialidae
- Genus: Phassus
- Species: P. phalerus

Binomial name
- Phassus phalerus H. Druce, 1887

Species of moth

Phassus phalerus is a moth of the animal family Hepialidae first described by Herbert Druce in 1887. It is known from Mexico.
