= Metahepialus xenoctenis =

Scientific classification
- Kingdom: Animalia
- Phylum: Arthropoda
- Class: Insecta
- Order: Lepidoptera
- Family: Hepialidae
- Genus: Metahepialus
- Species: M. xenoctenis

Binomial name
- Metahepialus xenoctenis (Meyrick, 1926)

Species of moth

Metahepialus xenoctenis is a moth of the family Hepialidae. It is endemic to South Africa.
