= Pfitzneriella lucicola =

Scientific classification
- Domain: Eukaryota
- Kingdom: Animalia
- Phylum: Arthropoda
- Class: Insecta
- Order: Lepidoptera
- Family: Hepialidae
- Genus: Pfitzneriella
- Species: P. lucicola

Binomial name
- Pfitzneriella lucicola (Maassen, 1890)

Synonyms
- Triodia lucicola Maassen, 1890

Species of moth

Pfitzneriella lucicola is a moth of the family Hepialidae. It is found in Ecuador.
