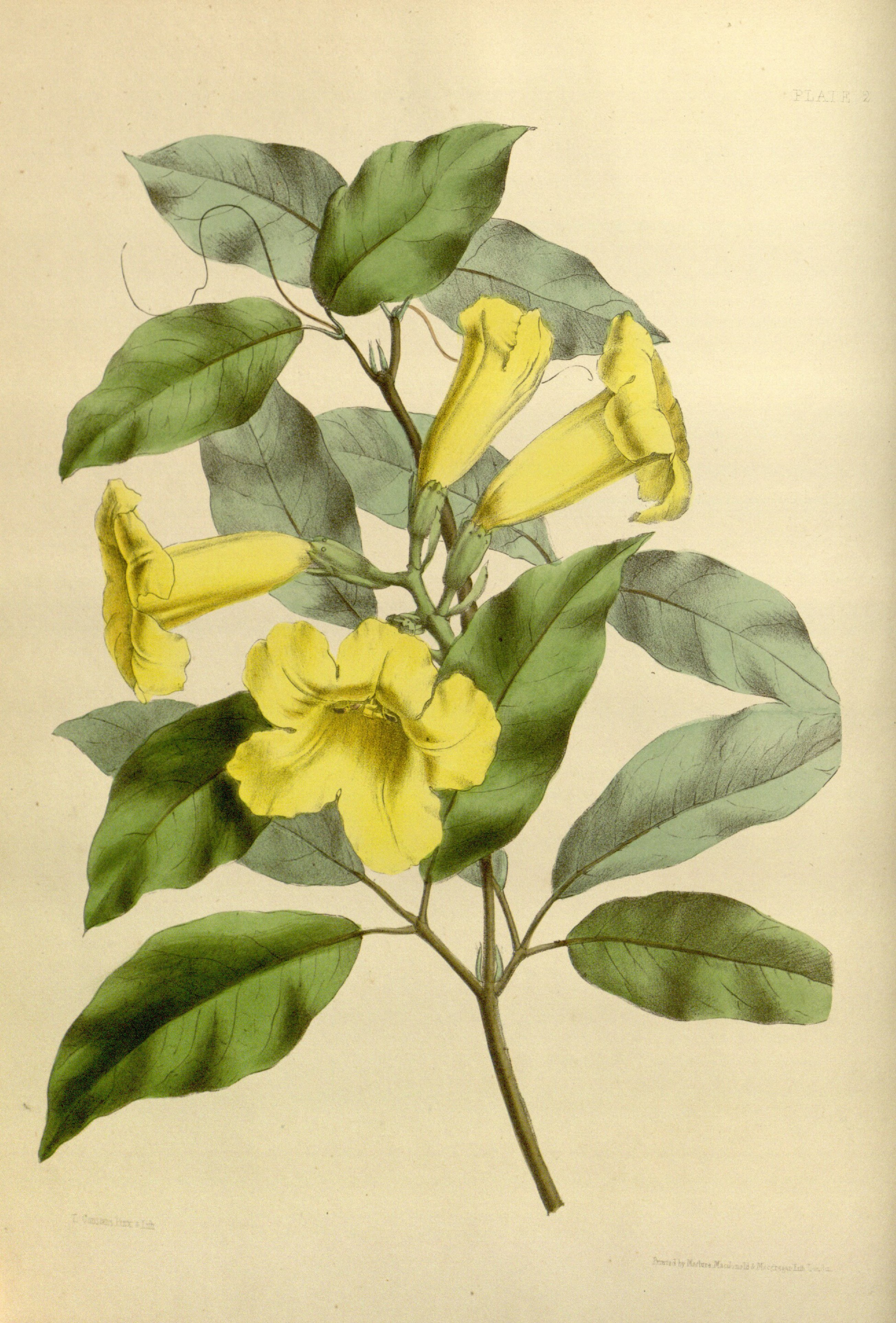
- Adenocalymma comosum

Scientific classification
- Kingdom: Plantae
- Clade: Tracheophytes
- Clade: Angiosperms
- Clade: Eudicots
- Clade: Asterids
- Order: Lamiales
- Family: Bignoniaceae
- Tribe: Bignonieae
- Genus: Adenocalymma; Mart. 1840

Species
- See text

Synonyms
- Gardnerodoxa Sandwith; Memora Miers; Neojobertia Baill.; Odontotecoma Bureau & K.Schum.; Pharseophora Miers

= Adenocalymma =

Genus of flowering plants

Adenocalymma is a genus of plants in the family Bignoniaceae. This New World genus of lianas contains approximately 93 accepted Species.

Its native range stretches from Mexico down to Tropical America. It is found in the countries of Argentina, Belize, Bolivia, Brazil, Colombia, Costa Rica, Ecuador, El Salvador, French Guiana, Guatemala, Guyana, Honduras, Mexico, Nicaragua, Panamá, Paraguay, Peru, Suriname, Trinidad-Tobago, Uruguay, Venezuela and the Windward Islands.

Adenocalymma species are used as food plants by the larva of the hepialid moth Trichophassus giganteus. The plants are pollinated by a variety of animals including insects, birds and bats.

== Selected species ==
- Adenocalymma alliaceum
- Adenocalymma apparicianum
- Adenocalymma apurense
- Adenocalymma arthropetiolatum
- Adenocalymma bracteatum
- Adenocalymma calycina
- Adenocalymma comosum
- Adenocalymma coriaceum
- Adenocalymma cosmosa
- Adenocalymma densiflora
- Adenocalymma dichilum
- Adenocalymma divaricatum
- Adenocalymma hatschbachii
- Adenocalymma impressum
- Adenocalymma inundatum
- Adenocalymma itayana
- Adenocalymma magdalenense
- Adenocalymma marginatum
- Adenocalymma mexiae
- Adenocalymma obovatum
- Adenocalymma obtusifolia
- Adenocalymma ocositense
- Adenocalymma paulistarum
- Adenocalymma prancei
- Adenocalymma purpurascens
- Adenocalymma saulense
- Adenocalymma scansile
- Adenocalymma sousae
- Adenocalymma subincanum
- Adenocalymma ternatum
- Adenocalymma uleanum
