= T. giganteus =

T. giganteus may refer to:

- Tarchia giganteus, an ankylosaurid dinosaur species from the late Cretaceous of Mongolia
- Titanus giganteus, the titan beetle, the largest known beetle species found in the Amazon rainforest
- Trichophassus giganteus, a moth species endemic to Brazil
