= Antihepialus capeneri =

Scientific classification
- Kingdom: Animalia
- Phylum: Arthropoda
- Class: Insecta
- Order: Lepidoptera
- Family: Hepialidae
- Genus: Antihepialus
- Species: A. capeneri

Binomial name
- Antihepialus capeneri Janse, 1948

Species of moth

Antihepialus capeneri is a species of moth of the family Hepialidae. It is known from South Africa.
