= Druceiella amazonensis =

Scientific classification
- Kingdom: Animalia
- Phylum: Arthropoda
- Class: Insecta
- Order: Lepidoptera
- Family: Hepialidae
- Genus: Druceiella
- Species: D. amazonensis

Binomial name
- Druceiella amazonensis Viette, 1950

Species of moth

Druceiella amazonensis is a species of moth of the family Hepialidae. It is known from Brazil.
