= Napialus kulingi =

Scientific classification
- Domain: Eukaryota
- Kingdom: Animalia
- Phylum: Arthropoda
- Class: Insecta
- Order: Lepidoptera
- Family: Hepialidae
- Genus: Napialus
- Species: N. kulingi

Binomial name
- Napialus kulingi (Daniel, 1940)

Synonyms
- Phassus kulingi Daniel, 1940

Species of moth

Napialus kulingi is a moth of the family Hepialidae. It is endemic to China.
