= Pfitzneriana vogli =

Scientific classification
- Kingdom: Animalia
- Phylum: Arthropoda
- Class: Insecta
- Order: Lepidoptera
- Family: Hepialidae
- Genus: Pfitzneriana
- Species: P. vogli

Binomial name
- Pfitzneriana vogli Viette, 1952

Species of moth

Pfitzneriana vogli is a moth of the family Hepialidae. It is found in Venezuela.
