= Phassus costaricensis =

Scientific classification
- Domain: Eukaryota
- Kingdom: Animalia
- Phylum: Arthropoda
- Class: Insecta
- Order: Lepidoptera
- Family: Hepialidae
- Genus: Phassus
- Species: P. costaricensis

Binomial name
- Phassus costaricensis H. Druce, 1887

Species of moth

Phassus costaricensis is a moth of the family Hepialidae first described by Herbert Druce in 1887. It is known from Costa Rica, from which its species epithet is derived.
