= Druceiella metellus =

Scientific classification
- Domain: Eukaryota
- Kingdom: Animalia
- Phylum: Arthropoda
- Class: Insecta
- Order: Lepidoptera
- Family: Hepialidae
- Genus: Druceiella
- Species: D. metellus

Binomial name
- Druceiella metellus (H. Druce, 1890)

Synonyms
- Hepialus metellus H. Druce, 1890

Species of moth

Druceiella metellus is a species of moth of the family Hepialidae first described by Herbert Druce in 1890. It is known from Ecuador.
