= Phassus triangularis =

Scientific classification
- Domain: Eukaryota
- Kingdom: Animalia
- Phylum: Arthropoda
- Class: Insecta
- Order: Lepidoptera
- Family: Hepialidae
- Genus: Phassus
- Species: P. triangularis

Binomial name
- Phassus triangularis Edwards, 1885

Synonyms
- Phassus triangularides Pfitzner, 1938

Species of moth

Phassus triangularis is a moth of the family Hepialidae. It is known from Mexico.
