= Calada fuegensis =

Scientific classification
- Kingdom: Animalia
- Phylum: Arthropoda
- Class: Insecta
- Order: Lepidoptera
- Family: Hepialidae
- Genus: Calada
- Species: C. fuegensis

Binomial name
- Calada fuegensis Nielsen and Robinson, 1983

Species of moth

Calada fuegensis is a species of moth of the family Hepialidae. It is endemic to Argentina.
