= Phassus pretiosus =

Scientific classification
- Domain: Eukaryota
- Kingdom: Animalia
- Phylum: Arthropoda
- Class: Insecta
- Order: Lepidoptera
- Family: Hepialidae
- Genus: Phassus
- Species: P. pretiosus

Binomial name
- Phassus pretiosus (Herrich-Schaffer, [1856])

Synonyms
- Epialus pretiosus Herrich-Schaffer, [1856]

Species of moth

Phassus pretiosus is a moth of the family Hepialidae. It is known from Brazil.
