= Antihepialus keniae =

Scientific classification
- Kingdom: Animalia
- Phylum: Arthropoda
- Clade: Pancrustacea
- Class: Insecta
- Order: Lepidoptera
- Family: Hepialidae
- Genus: Antihepialus
- Species: A. keniae

Binomial name
- Antihepialus keniae (Holland, 1892)

Synonyms
- Hepialus keniae Holland, 1892; Hepialus tanganyicus Rebel, 1914

Species of moth

Antihepialus keniae is a species of moth of the family Hepialidae described by William Jacob Holland in 1892. It is known from Kenya, Tanzania and Uganda.
