= Phassus huebneri =

Scientific classification
- Domain: Eukaryota
- Kingdom: Animalia
- Phylum: Arthropoda
- Class: Insecta
- Order: Lepidoptera
- Family: Hepialidae
- Genus: Phassus
- Species: P. huebneri

Binomial name
- Phassus huebneri (Geyer, [1838])

Synonyms
- Pharmacis huebneri Geyer, [1838]; Phassus argentiferus Walker, 1856; Phassus pedipogon Strand, 1916

Species of moth

Phassus huebneri is a moth of the family Hepialidae. It is known from Mexico and Costa Rica.
