= Phassus chrysodidyma =

Scientific classification
- Domain: Eukaryota
- Kingdom: Animalia
- Phylum: Arthropoda
- Class: Insecta
- Order: Lepidoptera
- Family: Hepialidae
- Genus: Phassus
- Species: P. chrysodidyma

Binomial name
- Phassus chrysodidyma Dyar, 1915

Species of moth

Phassus chrysodidyma is a moth of the family Hepialidae. It is known to be from Mexico.
