= Xhoaphryx =

Scientific classification
- Kingdom: Animalia
- Phylum: Arthropoda
- Class: Insecta
- Order: Lepidoptera
- Family: Hepialidae
- Genus: Xhoaphryx; Viette, 1953
- Species: X. lemeei

Binomial name
- Xhoaphryx lemeei Viette, 1953

Genus of moths

Xhoaphryx is a monotypic moth genus of the family Hepialidae. The only described species is X. lemeei of Vietnam.
