= Andeabatis =

Scientific classification
- Kingdom: Animalia
- Phylum: Arthropoda
- Class: Insecta
- Order: Lepidoptera
- Family: Hepialidae
- Genus: Andeabatis; Nielsen & Robinson, 1983
- Species: A. chilensis

Binomial name
- Andeabatis chilensis (Ureta, 1951)

Synonyms
- Xyleutes chilensis Ureta, 1951

Genus of moths

Andeabatis is a monotypic moth genus of the family Hepialidae. The only species is Andeabatis chilensis of southern South America.
