= Blanchardinella =

Scientific classification
- Kingdom: Animalia
- Phylum: Arthropoda
- Clade: Pancrustacea
- Class: Insecta
- Order: Lepidoptera
- Family: Hepialidae
- Genus: Blanchardinella; Nielsen, Robinson & Wagner, 2000
- Species: B. venosus

Binomial name
- Blanchardinella venosus (Blanchard, 1852)

Synonyms
- Genus: Blanchardina Viette, 1950; Species: Agialus venosus Blanchard, 1852; Blanchardina venosus

Genus of moths

Blanchardinella is a genus of moths of the family Hepialidae. It consists of only one species, Blanchardinella venosus, which is found in Chile. The genus was named in honour of Émile Blanchard.
