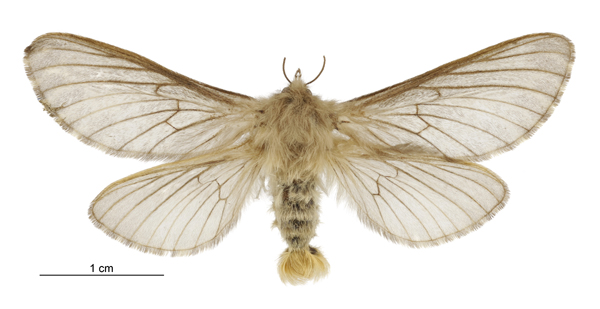

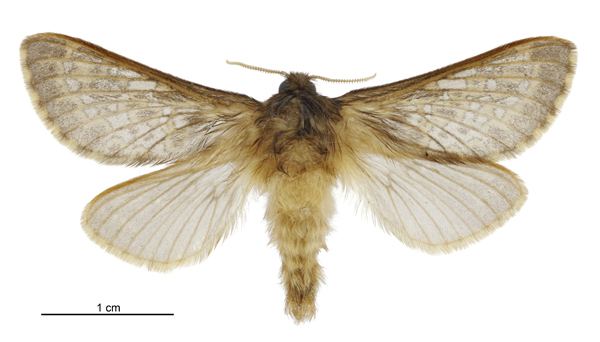
- Female (top) and male (bottom)

Scientific classification
- Kingdom: Animalia
- Phylum: Arthropoda
- Clade: Pancrustacea
- Class: Insecta
- Order: Lepidoptera
- Family: Hepialidae
- Genus: Cladoxycanus; Dumbleton, 1966
- Species: C. minos

Binomial name
- Cladoxycanus minos (Hudson, 1905)

Synonyms
- Porina minos Hudson, 1905; Porina autumnata Hudson, 1920

= Cladoxycanus =

Cladoxycanus minos

Genus of moths

Cladoxycanus is a monotypic genus of moths belonging to the family Hepialidae. It consists of only one species, Cladoxycanus minos, which is endemic to New Zealand. C. minos was first described by George Hudson in 1905.

== Behaviour ==
Adults of this species are attracted to light and have been collected via a mercury vapour light trap.
