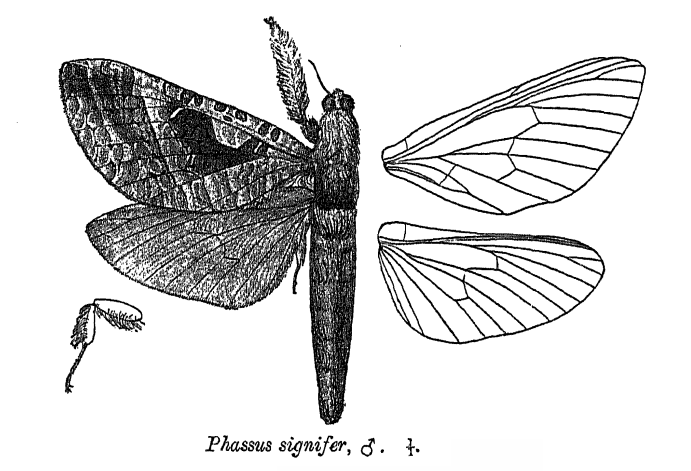

Scientific classification
- Kingdom: Animalia
- Phylum: Arthropoda
- Class: Insecta
- Order: Lepidoptera
- Family: Hepialidae
- Genus: Phassus; Walker, 1856

Species
- See text

= Phassus =

Genus of moths

Phassus is a genus of moths in the family Hepialidae. There are 21 described species distributed from Mexico south to Brazil.

== Species ==
- Phassus absyrtus - Brazil
- Phassus agrionides - Brazil
- Phassus aurigenus - Costa Rica
- Phassus basirei - Mexico
- Phassus championi - Guatemala
- Phassus costaricensis - Costa Rica
- Phassus chrysodidyma - Mexico
- Phassus eldorado - Venezuela
- Phassus exclamationis - Mexico
- Phassus huebneri - Mexico
- Phassus marcius - Mexico
- Phassus n-signatus - Guatemala
- Phassus phalerus - Mexico
- Phassus pharus - Guatemala

- Recorded food plants: Malvaceae, grasses including sugar cane

- Phassus pretiosus - Brazil
- Phassus rosulentus - Mexico
- Phassus smithi - Mexico
- Phassus tesselatus
- Phassus transversus - Brazil
- Phassus triangularis - Mexico
