= Parathitarodes =

Scientific classification
- Kingdom: Animalia
- Phylum: Arthropoda
- Class: Insecta
- Order: Lepidoptera
- Family: Hepialidae
- Genus: Parathitarodes; Ueda, 1999
- Species: P. changi

Binomial name
- Parathitarodes changi Ueda, 1999

Genus of moths

Parathitarodes is a monotypic moth genus of the family Hepialidae. The only described species is Parathitarodes changi, which is found in Taiwan.
