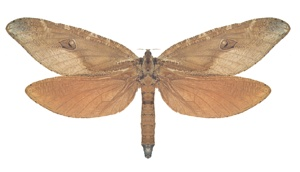

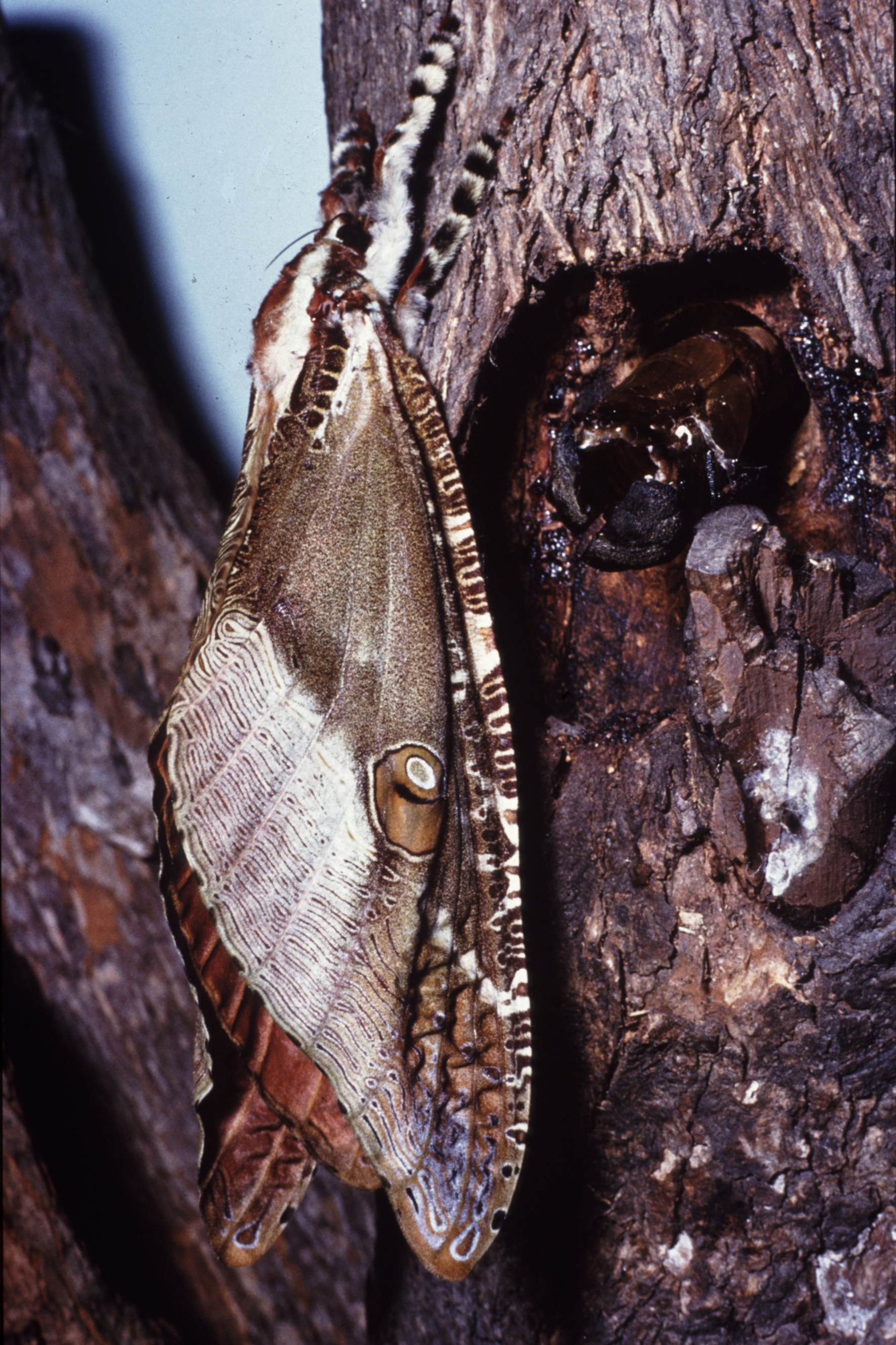

Scientific classification
- Kingdom: Animalia
- Phylum: Arthropoda
- Class: Insecta
- Order: Lepidoptera
- Family: Hepialidae
- Genus: Zelotypia; Scott, 1869
- Species: Z. stacyi

Binomial name
- Zelotypia stacyi Scott, 1869

Synonyms
- Genus: Xylopsyche Swainson, 1851; Species: Leto stacyi; Xylopsyche stacyii Swainson, 1851; Xylopsyche stacyi Scott, 1865; Zelotypia stacyi Scott, 1869; Zelotypia sinuosa Olliff, 1887; Xylopsyche staceyi

= Zelotypia =

Genus of moths

Zelotypia is a monotypic moth genus of the family Hepialidae. The only described species is Z. stacyi, the bentwing ghost moth, which is only found in Queensland and New South Wales, Australia. This is a very large species with a wingspan of up to 250 mm. The larva feeds and pupates in the trunks and branches of Eucalyptus.
