= Phialuse =

Scientific classification
- Domain: Eukaryota
- Kingdom: Animalia
- Phylum: Arthropoda
- Class: Insecta
- Order: Lepidoptera
- Family: Hepialidae
- Genus: Phialuse; Viette, 1961
- Species: P. palmar

Binomial name
- Phialuse palmar Viette, 1961

Genus of moths

Phialuse is a monotypic moth genus of the family Hepialidae. The only described species is P. palmar of Bolivia.
