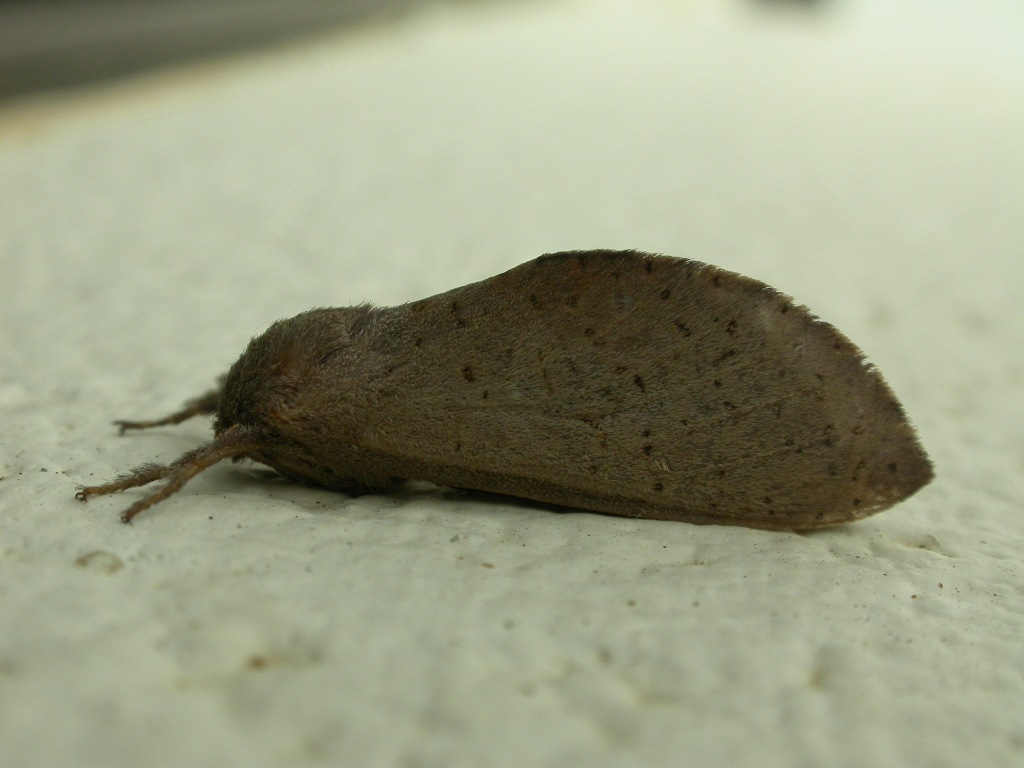
- Elhamma australasiae

Scientific classification
- Domain: Eukaryota
- Kingdom: Animalia
- Phylum: Arthropoda
- Class: Insecta
- Order: Lepidoptera
- Family: Hepialidae
- Genus: Elhamma; Walker, 1856

Species
- See text.

Synonyms
- Perissectis Meyrick, 1890; Pericentris Pagenstecher, 1909; Zauxieus Viette, 1952; Theaxieus Viette, 1952

= Elhamma =

Genus of moths

Elhamma is a genus of moths of the family Hepialidae. There are four described species found in Australia and New Guinea.

== Species ==
- Elhamma australasiae - Australia
- Elhamma diakonoffi - New Guinea
- Elhamma roepkei - New Guinea
- Elhamma toxopeusi - New Guinea
