= Adenocalymma arthropetiolatum =

Scientific classification
- Kingdom: Plantae
- Clade: Tracheophytes
- Clade: Angiosperms
- Clade: Eudicots
- Clade: Asterids
- Order: Lamiales
- Family: Bignoniaceae
- Genus: Adenocalymma
- Species: A. arthropetiolatum

Binomial name
- Adenocalymma arthropetiolatum A.H.Gentry

Species of plant

Adenocalymma arthropetiolatum is a species of flowering plant in the family Bignoniaceae, native to Panama and northwestern Colombia. A liana, it is found growing from sea level to 100 m (330 ft) in elevation.
