= Druceiella =

Scientific classification
- Kingdom: Animalia
- Phylum: Arthropoda
- Class: Insecta
- Order: Lepidoptera
- Family: Hepialidae
- Genus: Druceiella; Viette, 1949

Species
- D. amazonensis; D. basirubra; D. metellus; D. momus

Genus of moths

Druceiella is a genus of moths of the family Hepialidae. There are four described species, although a revision of the genus is being carried out which will add at least four new species. The current species are all found in South America.

Males of this genus are unusual in having an asymmetric extension at the end of the abdomen.

The genus was named in honour of the entomologist Herbert Druce (1846–1913).

== Species ==
- Druceiella amazonensis – Brazil
- Druceiella basirubra – Bolivia/Peru
- Druceiella metellus – Ecuador
- Druceiella momus – Ecuador
