= Parapielus =

Scientific classification
- Domain: Eukaryota
- Kingdom: Animalia
- Phylum: Arthropoda
- Class: Insecta
- Order: Lepidoptera
- Family: Hepialidae
- Genus: Parapielus; Viette, 1949

Species
- See text.

Synonyms
- Lossbergiana Viette, 1951

Genus of moths

Parapielus is a genus of moths of the family Hepialidae.

== Species ==
- Parapielus heimlichi Ureta, 1956
- Parapielus luteicornis Berg, 1882
- Parapielus oberthuri Viette, 1952
- Parapielus reedi Ureta, 1957
