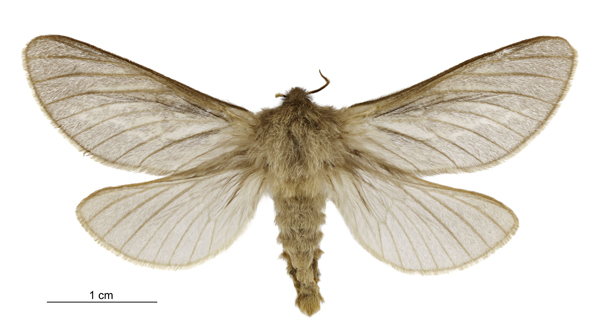
- Female
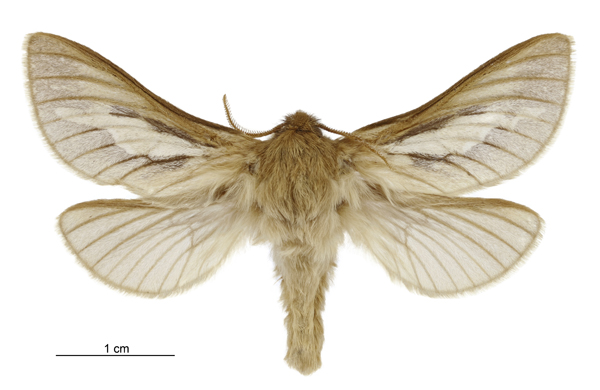
- Male

Scientific classification
- Kingdom: Animalia
- Phylum: Arthropoda
- Clade: Pancrustacea
- Class: Insecta
- Order: Lepidoptera
- Family: Hepialidae
- Genus: Heloxycanus; Dugdale, 1994
- Species: H. patricki

Binomial name
- Heloxycanus patricki Dugdale, 1994

= Heloxycanus =

Genus of moths

Heloxycanus patricki, also known as the sphagnum porina moth, is a species of moth of the family Hepialidae, the ghost moths. It is the only member of the genus Heloxycanus. This species is endemic to New Zealand. It has been classified as having the status of "At Risk, Declining" by the Department of Conservation.

== Taxonomy ==
This species was first described in 1994 by John S. Dugdale using a specimen collected by Brian Patrick at Dansey Pass on 8 April 1979. The species is named for its discoverer. The holotype specimen for this species is held at the New Zealand Arthropod Collection.

== Description ==
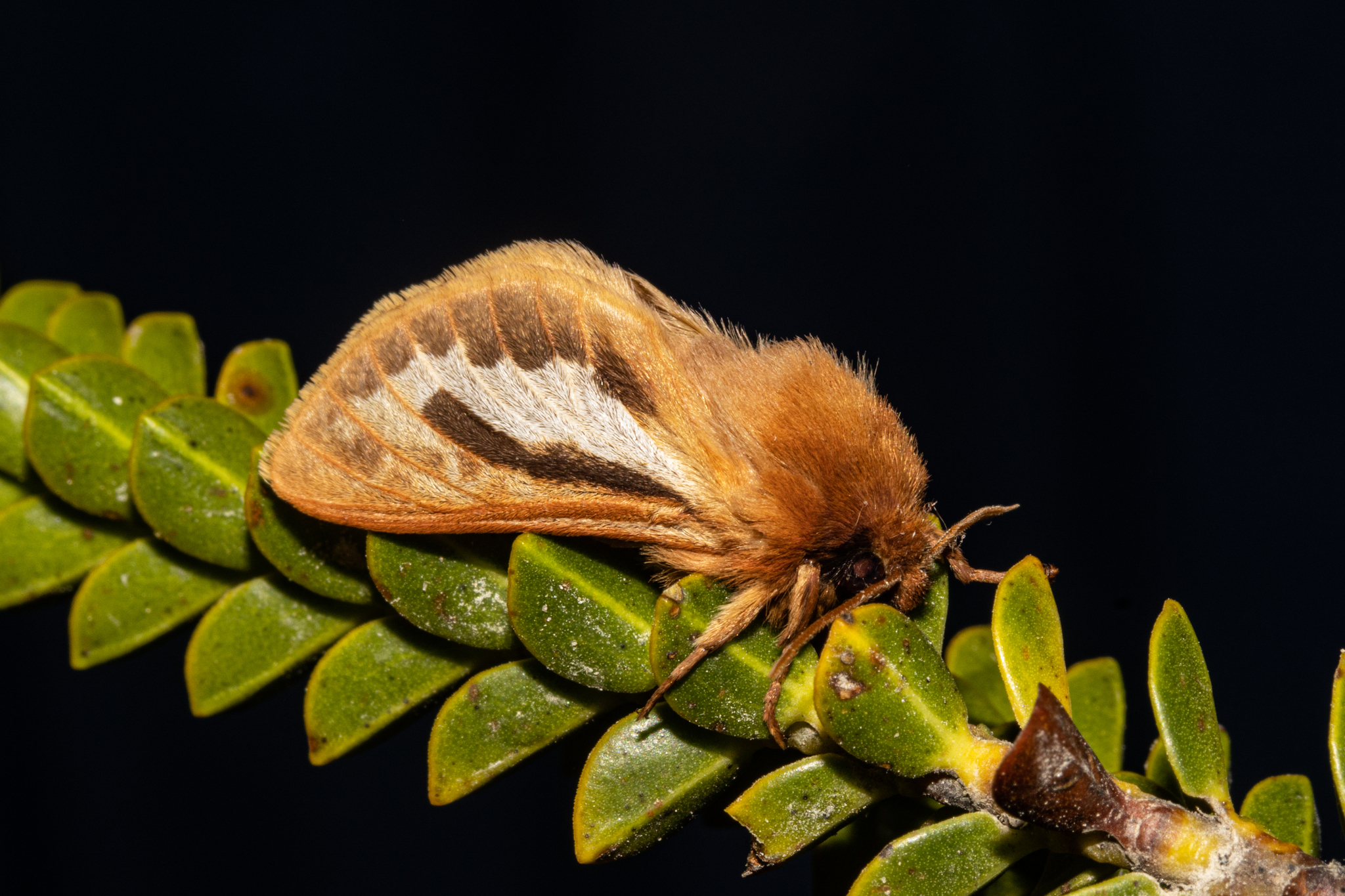
Living H. patricki

The wingspan of the female moth is 48–55mm while the male moth is between 40–45mm. There is a variation in colouration between the southern population in comparison to the northern and western populations. The southern population is more smokey brown in colour with a reduced forewing stripe and a shorter antenna segment at the apex. The other populations are a more yellowish-fawn colour with a distinctive white stripe on the forewings.

== Distribution ==
This species is endemic to New Zealand. It can be found in the following regions: the Otago Lakes, Central Otago, Dunedin, Southland, Fiordland and Stewart Island.

== Biology and behaviour ==
H. patricki has a life cycle that runs in two year cycles with peak numbers of adults occurring in odd-numbered years. This species is semiaquatic. Larvae are believed to feed on moss rhizoids. After the adult moths emerge their pupae cases can be found sticking up from the moss. H. patricki are a late autumn emerging moth. They generally begin to emerge in late March and are finished by mid-June although in Otago the emergence times are between mid-April and early June.

== Habitat ==
This moth is found in coastal and alpine moss bogs, mires and blanket bogs, peatland, and in Sphagnum bogs in the southern part of New Zealand.

== Conservation status ==
This species has been classified as having the "At Risk, Declining" conservation status under the New Zealand Threat Classification System. This classification results from the species' limited ability to disperse, its restrictive distribution to the southern part of New Zealand, and habitat loss.
