= Pfitzneriella =

Scientific classification
- Domain: Eukaryota
- Kingdom: Animalia
- Phylum: Arthropoda
- Class: Insecta
- Order: Lepidoptera
- Family: Hepialidae
- Genus: Pfitzneriella; Viette, 1951

Species
- See text.

Genus of moths

Pfitzneriella is a genus of moths of the family Hepialidae. There are four described species restricted to Ecuador and Peru.

== Species ==
- Pfitzneriella lucicola - Ecuador
- Pfitzneriella monticola - Ecuador
- Pfitzneriella remota - Peru
- Pfitzneriella similis - Peru
