= Antihepialus =

Scientific classification
- Domain: Eukaryota
- Kingdom: Animalia
- Phylum: Arthropoda
- Class: Insecta
- Order: Lepidoptera
- Family: Hepialidae
- Genus: Antihepialus; Janse, 1942

Species
- See text

Synonyms
- Ptycholoma Felder, 1874

Genus of moths

Antihepialus is a genus of moths of the family Hepialidae. There are four described species, found in southern and eastern Africa.

== Species ==
- Antihepialus antarcticus – South Africa
- Antihepialus capeneri – South Africa
- Antihepialus keniae – Kenya/Uganda
- Antihepialus vansoni – South Africa
