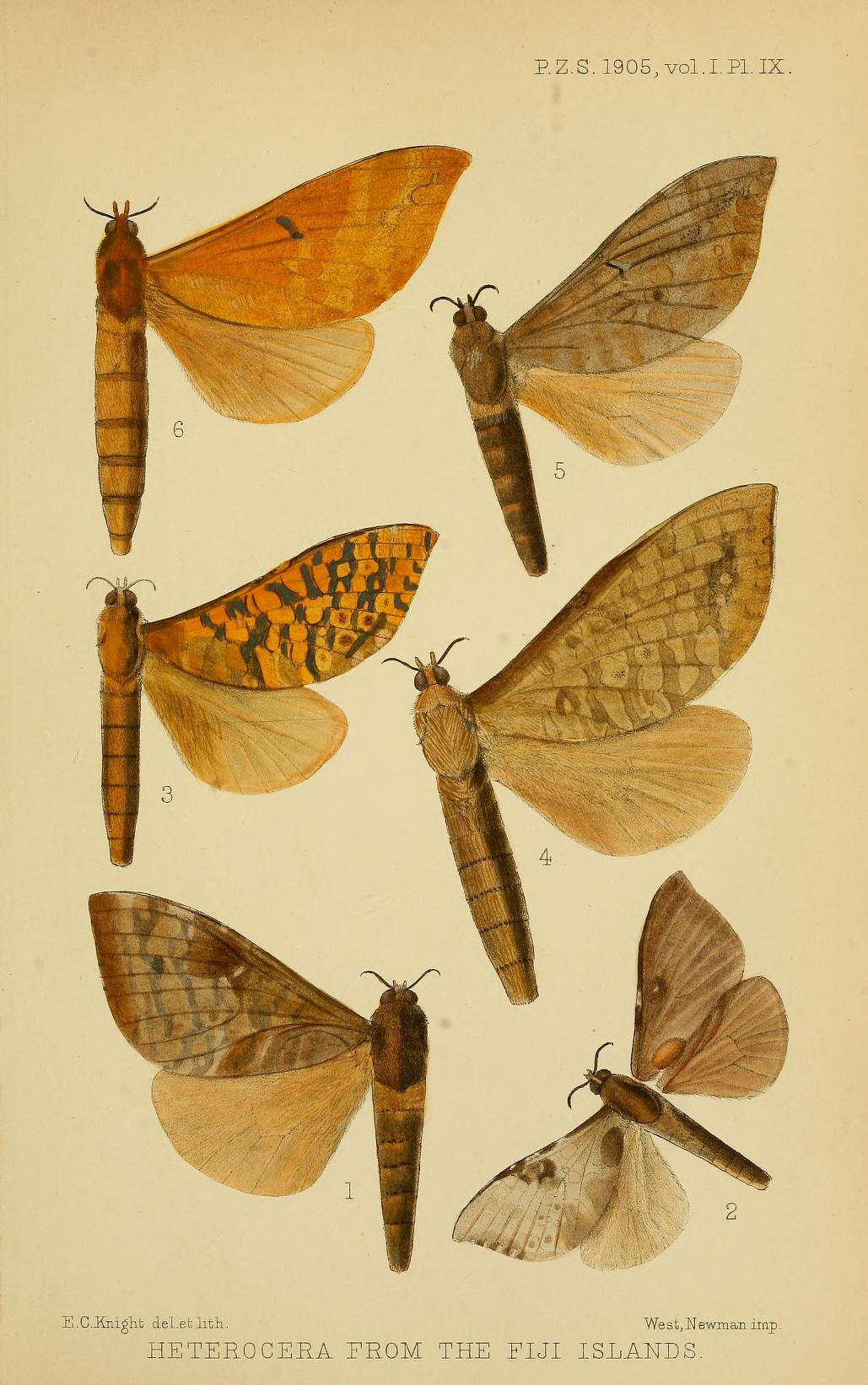
- Six specimens from Viti Levu, Fiji

Scientific classification
- Domain: Eukaryota
- Kingdom: Animalia
- Phylum: Arthropoda
- Class: Insecta
- Order: Lepidoptera
- Family: Hepialidae
- Genus: Phassodes; Bethune-Baker, 1905

Type species
- Phassodes odorevalvula Bethune-Baker, 1905

Species
- P. vitiensis (Rothschild, 1895)

Synonyms
- Species: Leto vitiensis Rothschild, 1895; Phassodes bimorpha Bethune-Baker, 1905; Phassodes guthrei Bethune-Baker, 1905; Phassodes nausori Bethune-Baker, 1905; Phassodes odorevalvula Bethune-Baker, 1905; Phassodes rewaensis Bethune-Baker, 1905; Phassodes vitensis Bethune-Baker, 1905

= Phassodes =

Genus of moths

Phassodes is a moth genus of the family Hepialidae. As of 2018, it is monospecific, consisting of the sole species Phassodes vitiensis; this species is very variable. It is found in Fiji and Samoa. The life cycle is unknown but the larva is presumed to feed underground on the roots of plants or decaying matter.

== Taxonomic history ==
The British entomologist George Thomas Bethune-Baker first circumscribed the genus Phassodes in 1905. He included six species, all of which he described in the same work. In 1950, the French entomologist Pierre Viette synonymized Bethune-Baker's P. nausori with P. vitiensis; P. vitiensis was first described by Walter Rothschild in 1895.
