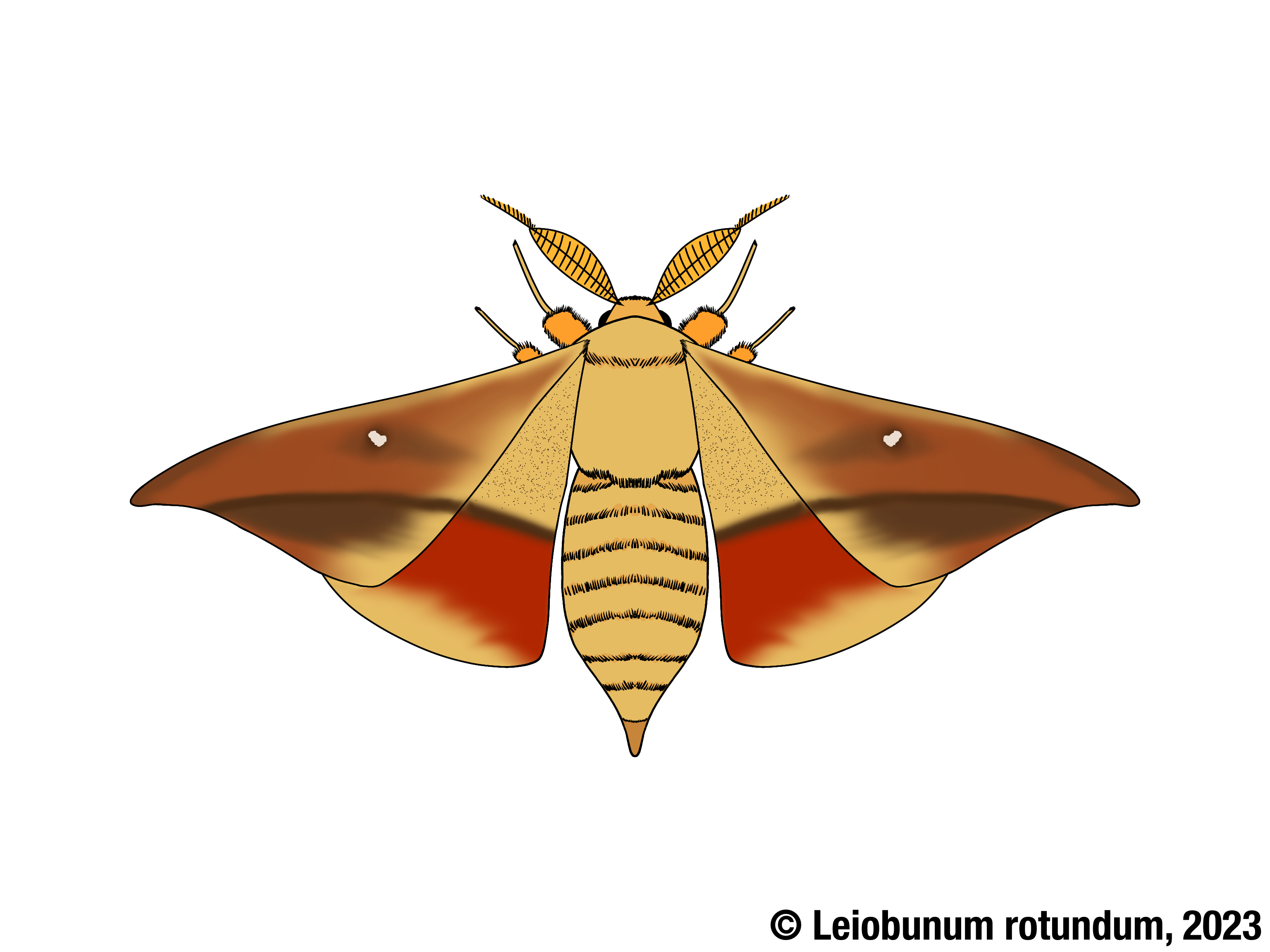

Scientific classification
- Domain: Eukaryota
- Kingdom: Animalia
- Phylum: Arthropoda
- Class: Insecta
- Order: Lepidoptera
- Family: Mimallonidae
- Genus: Gonogramma
- Species: G. lemoulti

Binomial name
- Gonogramma lemoulti Schaus, 1905

= Gonogramma lemoulti =

Species of moth

Gonogramma lemoulti is a species of mimallonid moth found in South America. It was described by William Schaus in 1905.
