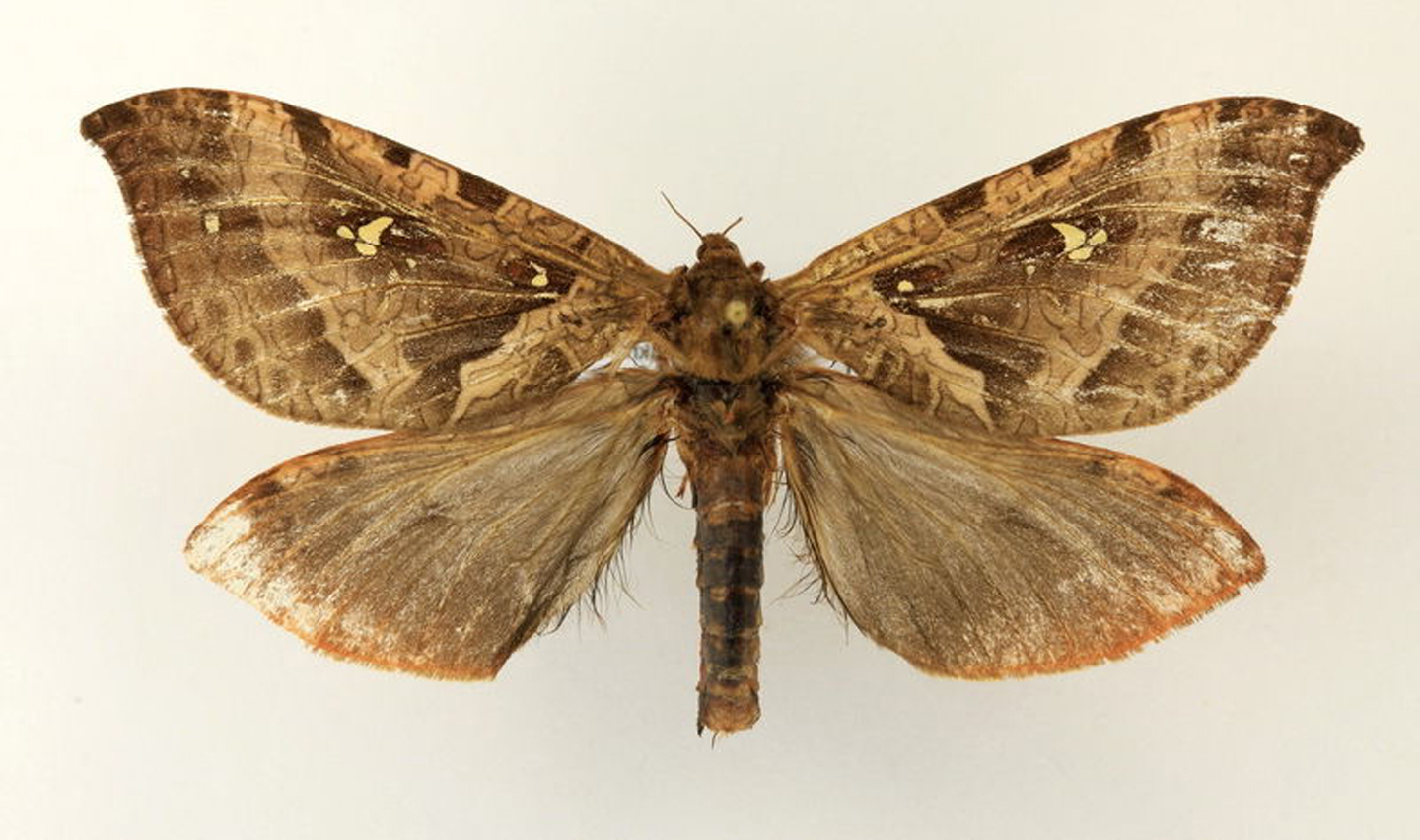

Scientific classification
- Domain: Eukaryota
- Kingdom: Animalia
- Phylum: Arthropoda
- Class: Insecta
- Order: Lepidoptera
- Family: Hepialidae
- Genus: Zenophassus; Tindale, 1941
- Species: Z. schamyl

Binomial name
- Zenophassus schamyl (Christoph, 1888)

Synonyms
- Hepialus schamyl Christoph, 1888; Phassus schamyl

= Zenophassus =

Genus of moths

Zenophassus is a monotypic moth genus of the family Hepialidae. The only described species is Z. schamyl of Georgia and Abkhazia. The larva of this species feeds on grapevines.

It was named after Imam Shamil, the leader of a nineteenth century rebellion against the Russian annexation of the Caucasus.
