= Roseala =

Scientific classification
- Domain: Eukaryota
- Kingdom: Animalia
- Phylum: Arthropoda
- Class: Insecta
- Order: Lepidoptera
- Family: Hepialidae
- Genus: Roseala; Viette, 1950
- Species: R. bourgognei

Binomial name
- Roseala bourgognei Viette, 1950

Genus of moths

Roseala is a monotypic moth genus of the family Hepialidae. The only described species is R. bourgognei which is endemic to Brazil.
