= Aplatissa =

Scientific classification
- Domain: Eukaryota
- Kingdom: Animalia
- Phylum: Arthropoda
- Class: Insecta
- Order: Lepidoptera
- Family: Hepialidae
- Genus: Aplatissa; Viette, 1950

Species
- See text

Genus of moths

Aplatissa is a genus of moths of the family Hepialidae. There are two described species, both endemic to Brazil.

== Species ==
- Aplatissa michaelis
- Aplatissa strangoides
