= Schausiana =

Scientific classification
- Domain: Eukaryota
- Kingdom: Animalia
- Phylum: Arthropoda
- Class: Insecta
- Order: Lepidoptera
- Family: Hepialidae
- Genus: Schausiana; Viette, 1950
- Species: S. trojesa

Binomial name
- Schausiana trojesa (Schaus, 1901)

Synonyms
- Phassus trojesa Schaus, 1901

Genus of moths

Schausiana is a monotypic moth genus of the family Hepialidae described by Pierre Viette in 1950. The only described species is Schausiana trojesa, described by William Schaus in 1901, which is endemic to Mexico.

The wingspan is about 70 mm. The forewings are grey, covered with minute black striae edged with light brown. The hindwings are greyish brown with light brown hairs at the base. Some of the veins on the outer margin are light brown.
