= Parahepialiscus =

Scientific classification
- Kingdom: Animalia
- Phylum: Arthropoda
- Class: Insecta
- Order: Lepidoptera
- Family: Hepialidae
- Genus: Parahepialiscus; Viette, 1950
- Species: P. borneensis

Binomial name
- Parahepialiscus borneensis (Pfitzner in Pfitzner and Gaede, 1933)

Synonyms
- Hepialiscus borneensis Pfitzner in Pfitzner and Gaede, 1933; Parahepialiscus baluensis Viette, 1950

Genus of moths

Parahepialiscus is a monotypic moth genus of the family Hepialidae. The only described species is P. borneensis of Borneo.
