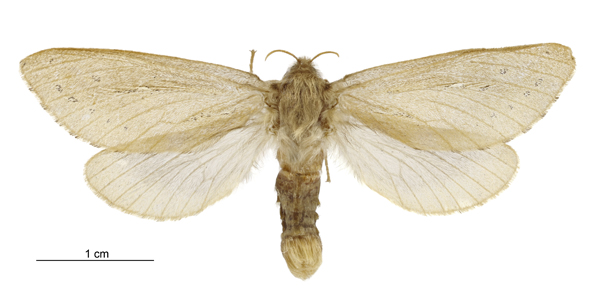
- Female specimen
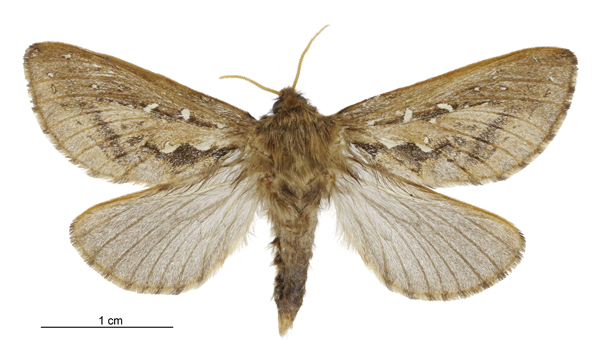
- Male specimen

Scientific classification
- Kingdom: Animalia
- Phylum: Arthropoda
- Clade: Pancrustacea
- Class: Insecta
- Order: Lepidoptera
- Family: Hepialidae
- Genus: Dioxycanus
- Species: D. oreas

Binomial name
- Dioxycanus oreas (Hudson, 1920)

Synonyms
- Porina oreas Hudson, 1920; Porina ascendens Meyrick, 1921; Porina descendens Hudson, 1923; Porina gourlayi Philpott, 1931

= Dioxycanus oreas =

Species of moth

Dioxycanus oreas is a species of moth of the family Hepialidae. It is endemic to New Zealand. It was first described by George Vernon Hudson in 1920. The species was discovered by Averil Lysaght.

The wingspan is 32–40 mm for males and 42–50 mm for females. Adults are on wing from November to January.

== Distribution ==
In the North Island populations have been recorded on Mount Taranaki and in the Tararua Range. In the South Island populations have been observed in the Nelson, North Canterbury, Mid Canterbury and South Canterbury regions.

== Description ==
Dioxycanus oreas has moderate mandibles.

== Life cycle ==
Adult life spans are brief. Field observations conducted in 1973 recorded some adults living as long as 23 days but given the diverse range of predators most adults probably live no longer than a week.
