= Pfitzneriana =

Scientific classification
- Domain: Eukaryota
- Kingdom: Animalia
- Phylum: Arthropoda
- Class: Insecta
- Order: Lepidoptera
- Family: Hepialidae
- Genus: Pfitzneriana; Viette, 1952

Species
- See text.

Genus of moths

Pfitzneriana is a genus of moths of the family Hepialidae. There are four described species, all found in South America.

== Species ==
- Pfitzneriana allura - Bolivia
- Pfitzneriana olivescens - Colombia
- Pfitzneriana prosopus - Colombia
- Pfitzneriana volgi - Venezuela
