= Parahepialus =

Scientific classification
- Kingdom: Animalia
- Phylum: Arthropoda
- Class: Insecta
- Order: Lepidoptera
- Family: Hepialidae
- Genus: Parahepialus; Z.-W. Zou, X. Liu & G.-R. Zhang, 2010
- Species: P. nebulosus

Binomial name
- Parahepialus nebulosus (Alphéraky, 1889)

Synonyms
- Hepialus nebulosus Alphéraky, 1889; Thitarodes nebulosus; Hepialus luteus Grum-Grshimailo, 1891; Thitarodes luteus

Species of insect

Parahepialus is a monotypic moth genus in the family Hepialidae described by Zhi-Wen Zou, Xin Liu and Gu-Ren Zhang in 2010. Its only species, Parahepialus nebulosus, was described by Sergei Alphéraky in 1889 and is known from the Tibet Autonomous Region in China.
