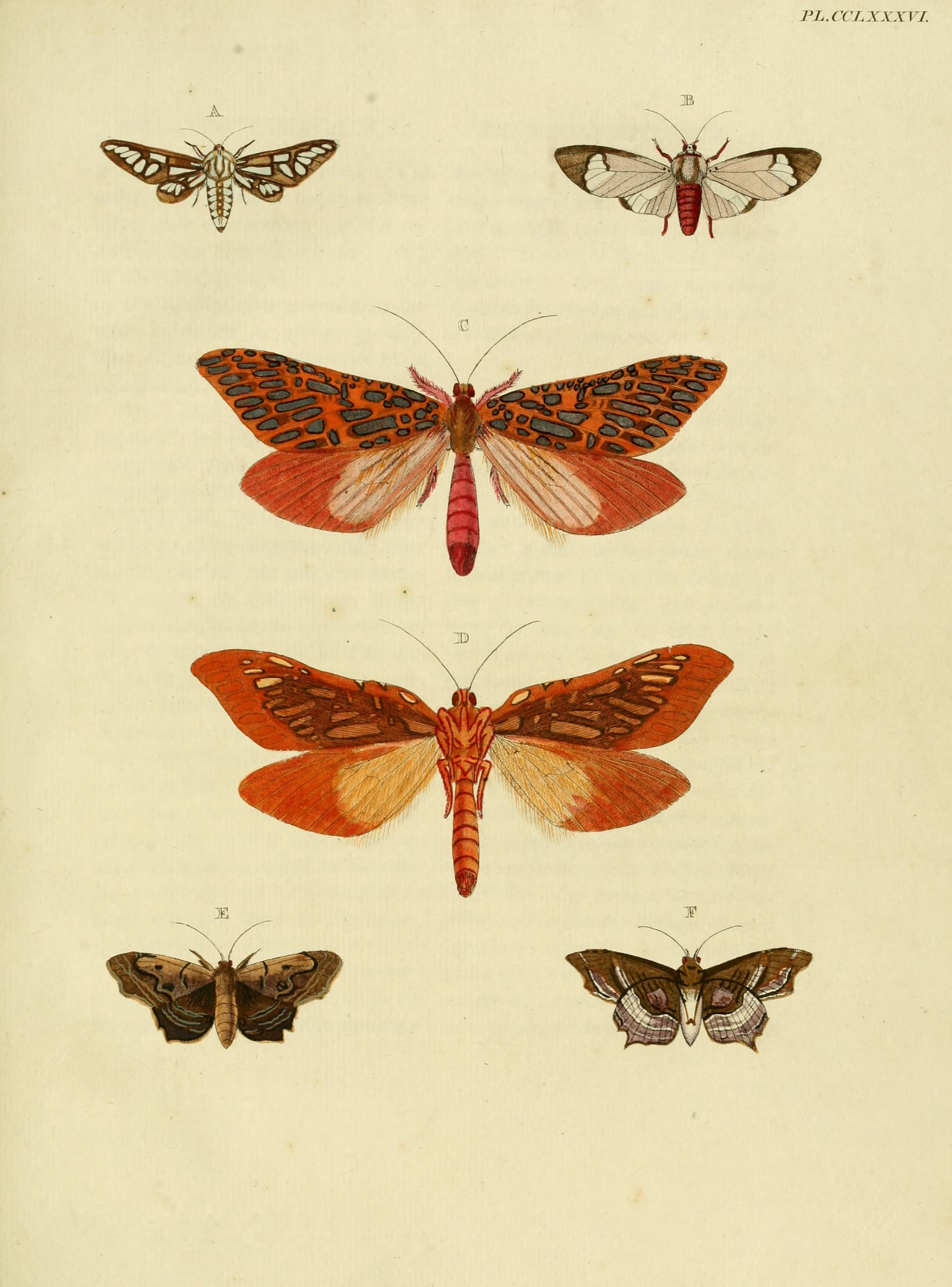
- Illustration in Uitlandsche kapellen

Scientific classification
- Kingdom: Animalia
- Phylum: Arthropoda
- Class: Insecta
- Order: Lepidoptera
- Family: Hepialidae
- Genus: Leto; Hübner, 1820
- Species: L. venus

Binomial name
- Leto venus (Cramer, 1780)

Synonyms
- Genus: Ecto Pagenstecher, 1909; Species: Phalaena venus Cramer, 1780

= Leto venus =

Leto

Species of moth

Leto is a monotypic moth genus of the family Hepialidae described by Jacob Hübner in 1820. The only described species is Leto venus, described by Pieter Cramer in 1780, which is endemic to South Africa. The larval food plant is Virgilia.
