= Calada =

Scientific classification
- Kingdom: Animalia
- Phylum: Arthropoda
- Class: Insecta
- Order: Lepidoptera
- Family: Hepialidae
- Genus: Calada; Nielsen & Robinson, 1983

Genus of moths

Calada is a genus of moths of the family Hepialidae. There are two described species, both endemic to Argentina.

== Species ==
- Calada fuegensis
- Calada migueli
