= Neohepialiscus =

Scientific classification
- Kingdom: Animalia
- Phylum: Arthropoda
- Class: Insecta
- Order: Lepidoptera
- Family: Hepialidae
- Genus: Neohepialiscus; Viette, 1948
- Species: N. algeriensis

Binomial name
- Neohepialiscus algeriensis (de Joannis, 1903)

Synonyms
- Hepialiscus algeriensis de Joannis, 1903; Hepialiscus joannisi Lucas, 1905; Hepialiscus bicolor Pfitzner, 1912; Hepialus tunetanus Oberthur, 1917

Genus of moths

Neohepialiscus is a monotypic moth genus of the family Hepialidae. The only described species is N. algeriensis of Algeria and Tunisia.
