= Napialus =

Scientific classification
- Domain: Eukaryota
- Kingdom: Animalia
- Phylum: Arthropoda
- Class: Insecta
- Order: Lepidoptera
- Family: Hepialidae
- Genus: Napialus; Chu and Wang, 1985

Species
- See text.

Genus of moths

Napialus is a genus of moths of the family Hepialidae. There are three described species, all endemic to China.

== Species ==
- Napialus hunanensis - Hunan
- Napialus kulingi
- Napialus chongquingensis - Chongqing
