= Dioxycanus =

Scientific classification
- Kingdom: Animalia
- Phylum: Arthropoda
- Clade: Pancrustacea
- Class: Insecta
- Order: Lepidoptera
- Family: Hepialidae
- Genus: Dioxycanus; Dumbleton, 1966

Species
- See text.

Genus of moths

Dioxycanus is a genus of moths of the family Hepialidae. There are 2 described species, both endemic to New Zealand.

== Species ==
- Dioxycanus fusca
- Dioxycanus oreas
