= Metahepialus =

Scientific classification
- Domain: Eukaryota
- Kingdom: Animalia
- Phylum: Arthropoda
- Class: Insecta
- Order: Lepidoptera
- Family: Hepialidae
- Genus: Metahepialus; Janse, 1942

Species
- See text.

Genus of moths

Metahepialus is a genus of moths of the family Hepialidae. There are two described species, all endemic to South Africa.

== Species ==
- Metahepialus plurimaculata
- Metahepialus xenoctenis
