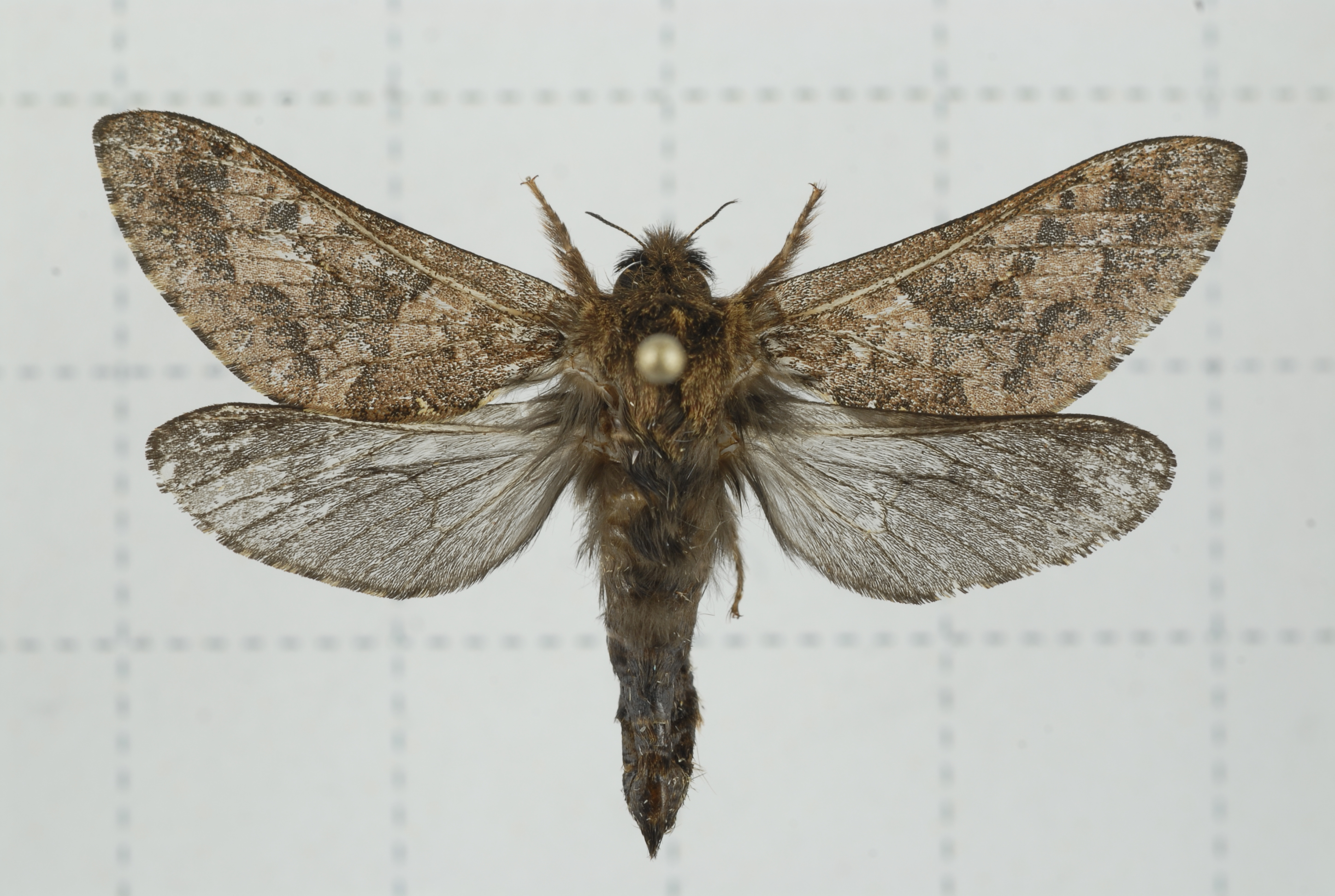

Scientific classification
- Domain: Eukaryota
- Kingdom: Animalia
- Phylum: Arthropoda
- Class: Insecta
- Order: Lepidoptera
- Family: Hepialidae
- Genus: Hepialiscus; Hampson, 1893

Species
- See text.

= Hepialiscus =

Genus of moths

Hepialiscus is a genus of moths of the family Hepialidae. There are four described species found in Taiwan and Nepal. The larvae feed on grasses.

== Species ==
- Hepialiscus monticola - Taiwan
- Hepialiscus nepalensis - Nepal
- Hepialiscus robinsoni - Taiwan
- Hepialiscus taiwanus - Taiwan
