= Puermytrans =

Scientific classification
- Kingdom: Animalia
- Phylum: Arthropoda
- Class: Insecta
- Order: Lepidoptera
- Family: Hepialidae
- Genus: Puermytrans; Viette, 1951
- Species: P. chiliensis

Binomial name
- Puermytrans chiliensis (Viette, 1951)

Genus of moths

Puermytrans is a monotypic moth genus of the family Hepialidae. The only described species is P. chiliensis of Chile.
