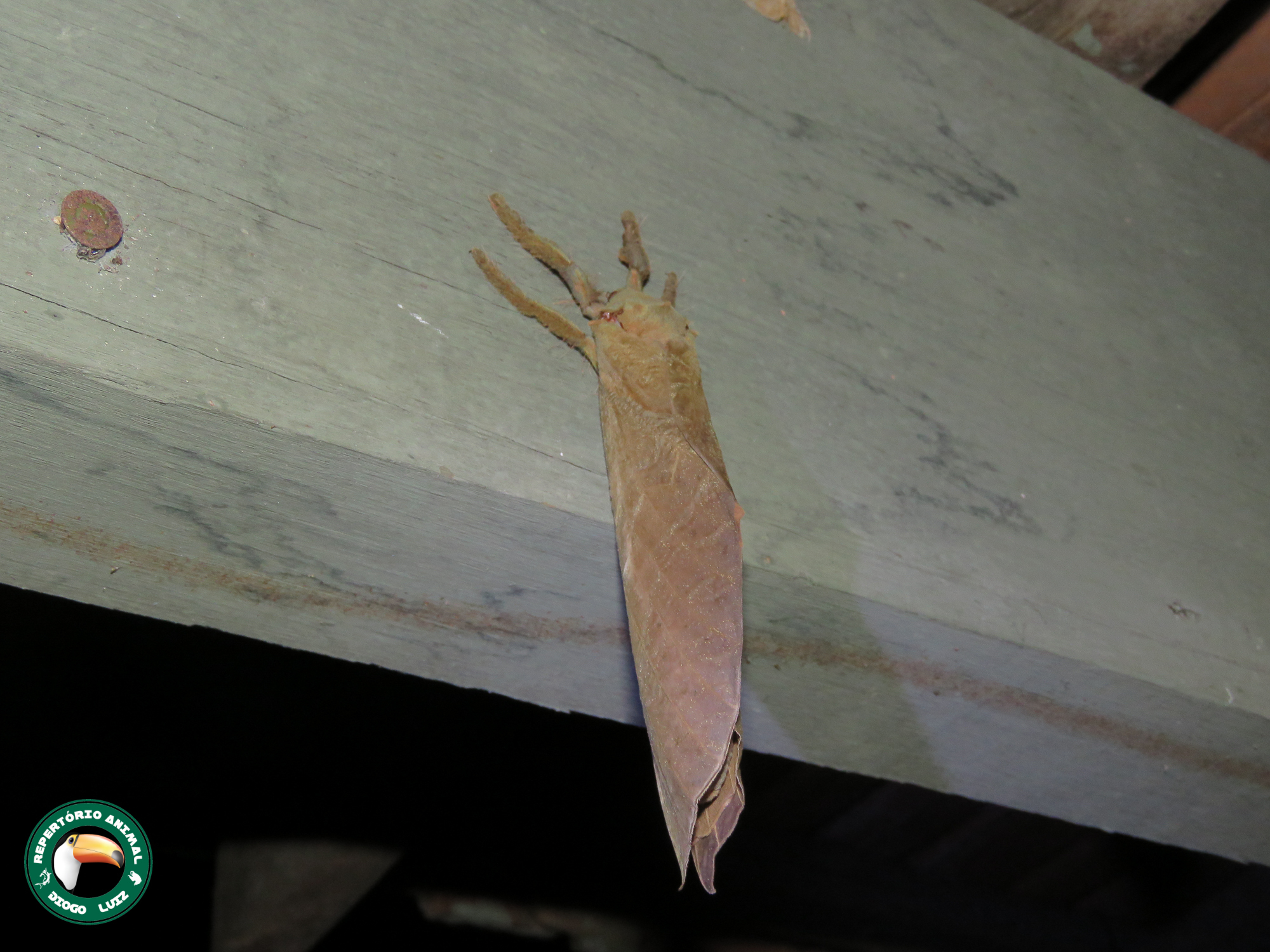
- Trichophassus giganteus

Scientific classification
- Kingdom: Animalia
- Phylum: Arthropoda
- Class: Insecta
- Order: Lepidoptera
- Family: Hepialidae
- Genus: Trichophassus; Le Cerf, 1919
- Species: T. giganteus

Binomial name
- Trichophassus giganteus (Herrich-Schaffer, [1853])

Synonyms
- Epiolus giganteus Herrich-Schaffer, [1853]; Phassus hayeki Foetterle, 1903

= Trichophassus =

Trichophassus giganteus

Genus of moths

Trichophassus is a monotypic moth genus of the family Hepialidae. The only described species is Trichophassus giganteus which is endemic to Brazil. The larva of this species has been recorded feeding on Adenocalymma, Eucalyptus, Ipomoea and Solanum.
