= William Schaus =

American entomologist (1858–1942)

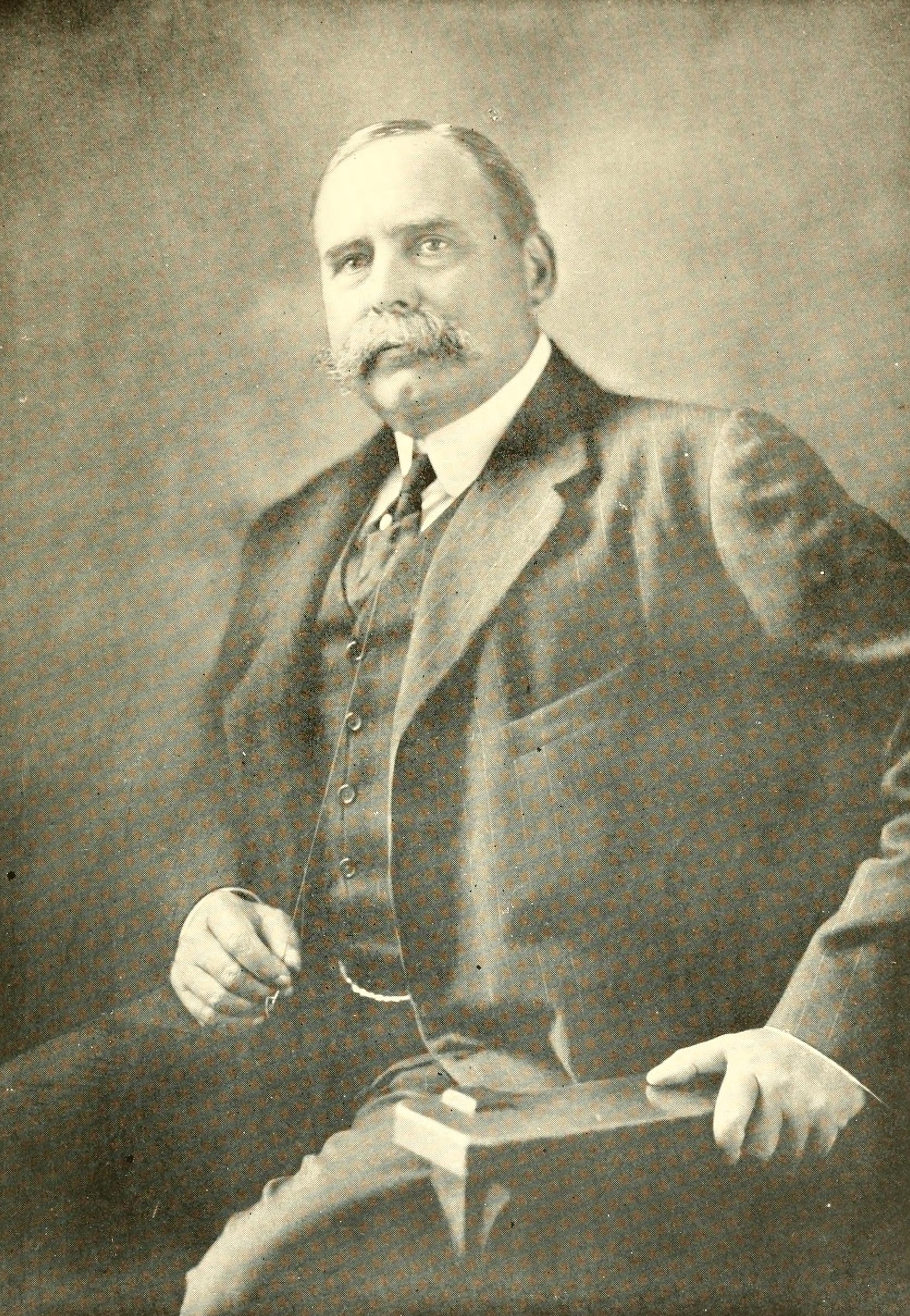

William Schaus (January 11, 1858, in New York City – June 20, 1942) was an American entomologist who became known for his major contribution to the knowledge and description of new species of the Neotropical Lepidoptera.

== Life ==
William Schaus Jr. was son of Wilhelm (later William) Schaus Sr., a German immigrant art collector and dealer, proprietor of the Schaus Galleries in New York City, and of Margaret Connover.

He was educated initially at Exeter Academy and then in France and Germany, and was influenced early in his career by Henry Edwards, although he also studied languages, art and music. Schaus received the honorary degree of Master of Arts from the University of Wisconsin in 1921, and in 1925 that of honorary Doctor of Science from the University of Pittsburgh. He decided, despite parental opposition, and at the sacrifice of a promising career as successor in his father's business, to devote his life to the study of Lepidoptera.

Beginning in 1881, he travelled to Mexico, Costa Rica, Guatemala, Panama, Cuba, Jamaica, Dominica, Saint Kitts, the Guianas, Colombia and Brazil collecting over 200,000 Lepidoptera. He donated about 26,000 specimens of tropical moths and about 5,000 specimens of butterflies from the Old World, to the American Museum of Natural History. in 1901 and 1905.

In 1919 Schaus joined the Bureau of Entomology of the United States Department of Agriculture and, in 1921, began a long association with the Smithsonian Institution as an honorary curator of insects in the United States National Museum, to which he donated his library and his collection of Lepidoptera subsequent to 1905. He purchased most of the Dognin Collection for the USNM in 1925.

== Death ==
Schaus died on June 20, 1942.

== Legacy ==
He described 329 new genera and over five thousand new species of Lepidoptera, mostly from tropical America.

The genera Schausia and Schausiana were named in his honor, as well as numerous species with the specific epithet schausi . The common names of the Schaus's crow and Schaus' swallowtail butterflies also refer to him.

== Selected works ==
- American Lepidoptera: illustrations of new and rare species. Part I, London: R. H. Porter, 1892. (Work digitized by Biodiversity Heritage Library at )
- Descriptions of new American butterflies 1902. Kessinger Publishing (2010 reprint)

== See also ==
- Gonogramma lemoulti
