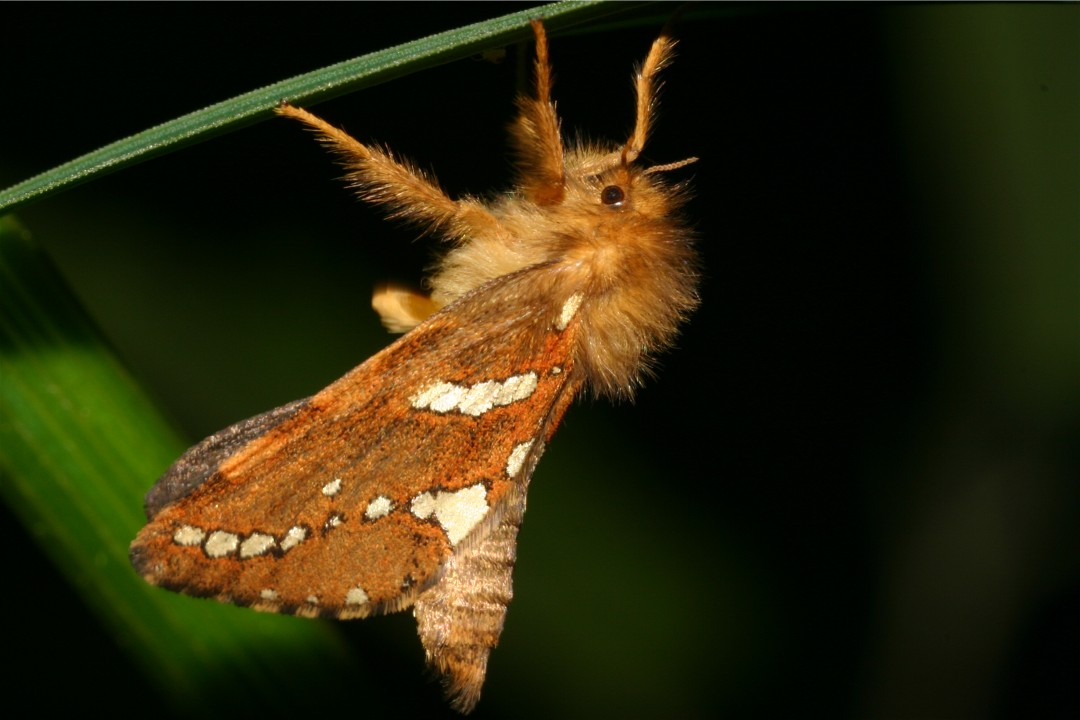
- Gold swift male "calling"

Scientific classification
- Kingdom: Animalia
- Phylum: Arthropoda
- Clade: Pancrustacea
- Class: Insecta
- Order: Lepidoptera
- Superfamily: Hepialoidea
- Family: Hepialidae; Stephens, 1829

Genera
- Abantiades Herrich-Schäffer, [1858]; Aenetus Herrich-Schäffer, [1858]; Afrotheora Nielsen and Scoble, 1986; Agripialus Mielke, Grehan & Koike, 2021; Ahamus Z.W. Zou & G.R. Zhang, 2010; Andeabatis Nielsen and Robinson, 1983; Antihepialus Janse, 1942; Aoraia Dumbleton, 1966; Aplatissa Viette, 1953; Archaeoaenetus Simonsen, 2018; Bipectilus Chus and Wang, 1985; Blanchardinella Nielsen, Robinson & Wagner, 2000; Bordaia Tindale, 1932; Calada Nielsen and Robinson, 1983; Callipielus Butler, 1882; Cibyra Walker, 1856; Cladoxycanus Dumbleton, 1966; Dalaca Walker, 1856; Dalaca auctt., nec Walker, 1856; Dioxycanus Dumbleton, 1966; Druceiella Viette, 1949; Dugdaleiella Grehan & C. Mielke, 2018; Dumbletonius Dugdale, 1994; Elhamma Walker, 1856; Endoclita; Felder, 1874; Eudalaca Viette, 1950; Fraus Walker, 1856; Gazoryctra Hübner, [1820]; Gorgopis Hübner, [1820]; Heloxycanus Dugdale, 1994; Hepialiscus Hampson, [1893]; Hepialus Fabricius, 1775; Huebneriella C. Mielke & Grehan, 2019; Jeana Tindale, 1935; Korscheltellus Börner, 1920; Kozloviella Grehan & C. Mielke, 2018; Leto Hübner, [1820]; Limyra Mielke, Dell’Erba & Duarte, 2017; Magnificus Yan, 2000; Metahepialus Janse, 1942; Mutipialus C. Mielke, Grehan & Koike, 2021; Napialus Chu and Wang, 1985; Neohepialiscus Viette, 1948; Neoleto Eitschberger & Stroehle, 2021; Oncopera Walker, 1856; Oxycanus Walker, 1856; Pallas Mielke & Grehan, 2015; Palpifer Hampson, [1893]; Parahepialus Z.W. Zou & D.R. Zhang, 2010; Parahepialiscus Viette, 1950; Parapielus Viette, 1949; Parathitarodes Ueda, 1999; Pfitzneriana Viette, 1952; Pfitzneriella Viette, 1951; Pharmacis Hübner, [1820]; Phassodes Bethune-Baker, 1905; Phassus Walker, 1856; Phialuse Viette, 1961; Phthius Mielke & Grehan, 2017; Phymatopus Wallengren, 1869; Phymatopus auctt. nec Wallengren, 1869; Puermytrans Viette, 1951; Roseala Viette, 1950; Schausiana Viette, 1950; Sthenopis auctt. nec Packard, [1865]; Thitarodes Viette, 1968; Trichophassus Le Cerf, 1919; Trictena Meyrick, 1890; Triodia Hübner, 1820; Vietteogorgopis Özdikmen, 2007; Viridigigas Grehan & Rawlins, 2016; Walkeriella Mielke, Grehan & Grados, 2019; Wallacella Mielke, Grehan & Cock, 2020; Weymerella Mielke, Grehan & Monzón-Sierra, 2022; Wiseana Viette, 1961; Xhoaphryx Viette, 1953; Zelotypia Scott, 1869; Zenophassus Tindale, 1941; †Oiophassus J. F. Zhang, 1989; †Prohepialus Piton, 1940; †Protohepialus Pierce, 1945

Diversity
- 82 genera and at least 700 species

= Hepialidae =

Family of moths

The Hepialidae are a family of insects in the lepidopteran order. Moths of this family are often referred to as swift moths or ghost moths.

== Taxonomy and systematics ==
The Hepialidae constitute by far the most diverse group of the infraorder Exoporia. The 82 genera contain at least 700 currently recognised species of these moths worldwide. The genera Fraus (endemic to Australia), Gazoryctra (Holarctic), Afrotheora (Southern African), and Antihepialus (African) are considered to be among the most basal, containing four genera and about 51 species with a mostly relictual southern Gondwanan distribution and are currently separated from the Hepialidae sensu stricto which might form a natural, derived group. The most diverse genera are Oxycanus with 78 species, Endoclita with 78 species, and Thitarodes with 80 species following a comprehensive catalogue of Exoporia. The relationships of the many genera are not yet well established; see below for an ordered synonymic generic checklist, and the Taxobox for navigation.

== Morphology and identification ==
The Hepialidae represent one of the most basal families within the Lepidoptera, exhibiting numerous structural differences from other moths, such as very short antennae and the absence of a functional proboscis or frenulum (see Kristensen, 1999: 61–62 for details). Like other Exoporia, sperm is transferred to the egg via an external channel between the ostium and the ovipore. In contrast, other non-Ditrysian moths possess a common cloaca. Hepialids are homoneurous, with similar forewings and hindwings, and are occasionally regarded as 'honorary' members of the Macrolepidoptera despite their basal position. Phylogenetically, they are classified among the Microlepidoptera, though species range from very small moths to a record wingspan of 250 mm in Zelotypia. Due to their often large size and striking color patterns, they have attracted more popular and taxonomic interest than most "micros". Many species exhibit pronounced sexual dimorphism, with males typically smaller but more boldly marked than females; at high elevations, females of genera such as Pharmacis and Aoraia display "brachypterous" wing reduction.

== Distribution ==
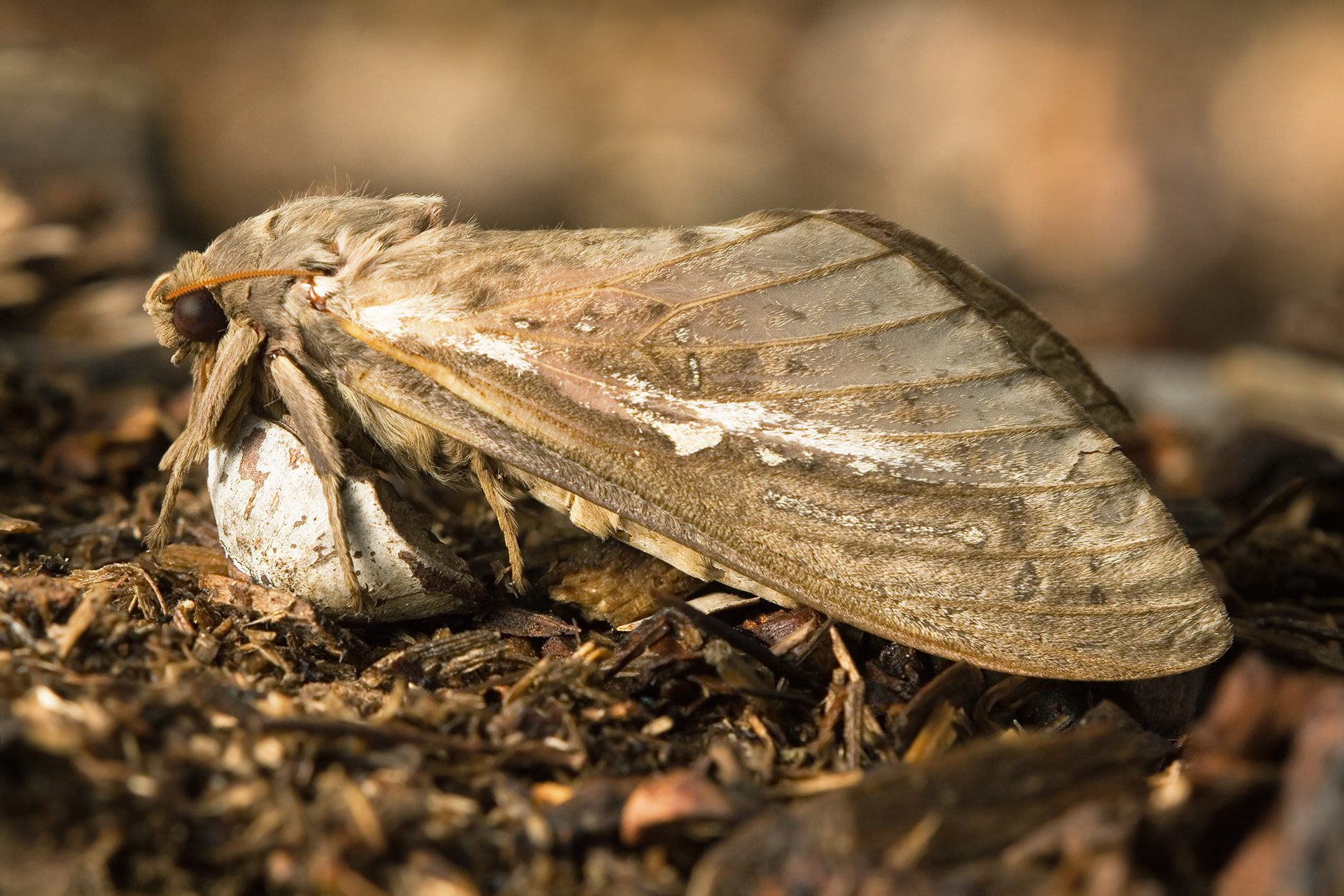
Abantiades latipennis, Tasmania, Australia

Hepialidae are distributed on ancient landmasses worldwide except Antarctica but with the surprising exceptions of Madagascar, the Caribbean islands and in Africa, tropical West Africa. It remains to be borne out if these absences are real as Aenetus cohici was not long ago discovered in New Caledonia. In the Oriental and Neotropical regions hepialids have diversified in rainforest environments, but this not apparently the case in the Afrotropics. Hepialids mostly have low dispersive powers and do not occur on oceanic islands with the exception of Phassodes on Fiji and Western Samoa and a few species in Japan and Kurile Islands. Whilst the type locality of Eudalaca sanctahelena is from the remote island of St Helena, this is thought to be an error for South Africa.

== Behaviour ==
Swift moths are usually crepuscular and some species form leks, also thought to have arisen independently in the genus Ogygioses (Palaeosetidae). In most genera, males fly swiftly to virgin females that are calling with scent. In other genera, virgin females "assemble" upwind to displaying males, which emit a pheromone from scales on the metathoracic tibiae. In such cases of sex role reversal, there may be visual cues also: males of the European ghost swift are possibly the most frequently noticed species, being white, ghostly and conspicuous when forming a lek at dusk. Sometimes they hover singly as if suspended from a thread or flying in a figure of eight motion. The chemical structures of some pheromones have been analysed.

== Biology ==
The female does not lay its eggs in a specific location but scatters ("broadcasts") them while in flight, sometimes in huge numbers (29,000 were recorded from a single female Trictena, which is presumably a world record for the Lepidoptera). The maggot-like larvae feed in a variety of ways. Probably all Exoporia have concealed larvae, making silken tunnels in all manner of substrates. Some species feed on leaf litter, fungi, mosses, decaying vegetation, ferns, gymnosperms and a wide span of monocot and dicot plants. There is very little evidence of hostplant specialisation; whilst the South African species Leto venus is restricted to the tree Virgilia capensis this may be a case of "ecological monophagy". A few feed on foliage (the austral 'oxyacanine' genera which may drag foliage into their feeding tunnel: Nielsen et al., 2000: 825). Most feed underground on fine roots, at least in early instars and some then feed internally in tunnels in the stem or trunk of their hostplants. Root-feeding larvae travelling through soil make silk-lined tunnels. Before pupating they make a vertical tunnel, which can be up to 10 cm deep, with an exit close to the ground surface. The pupae can then climb up and down to adjust to changes in temperature and flooding. Before the adult moth emerges, the pupa protrudes half way out at the ground surface. The pupa has rows of dorsal spines on the abdominal segments as in other lower members of the Heteroneura.

== Economic significance ==
Chinese medicine makes considerable use of the "mummies" collected of the caterpillar-attacking fungi Ophiocordyceps sinensis, and these can form an expensive ingredient. The witchetty grub (which are sometimes hepialid larvae) is a popular food source especially among aboriginal Australians. In Central America and South America, hepialid larvae are also eaten. However, some species of Wiseana, Oncopera, Oxycanus, Fraus and Dalaca are considered pests of pastures in Australia, New Zealand, and South America.

== Phylogeny ==
The Hepialidae were historically described as having "primitive" wing venation by John Henry Comstock (1893); in modern terms, this would rather be phrased and conceptualized as retaining ancestral wing venation. In his study Evolution of the Wings of Insects, he illustrated that the fore- and hindwings of Sthenopis (Hepialus) argenteomaculatus possess a five-branched radius, in contrast to other Lepidoptera where the hindwing radius is reduced to a single vein. This observation positioned the Hepialidae as a relict lineage preserving early-derived wing venation patterns.

== Faunas ==
=== Fauna of Europe ===
Source and identification

- Gazoryctra fuscoargenteus O. Bang-Haas 1927 – Northern Scandinavia
- Gazoryctra ganna (Hübner 1808) – Alps, northern Scandinavia, northern Russia
- Hepialus humuli Linnaeus 1758 (ghost moth) – Europe
- Korscheltellus lupulina Linnaeus 1758 (common swift) – Europe
- Pharmacis aemiliana Costantini 1911 – Italy
- Pharmacis anselminae Teobaldelli 1977 – Italy
- Pharmacis bertrandi Le Cerf 1936 – France
- Pharmacis carna Denis & Schiffermüller 1775 – Central and Eastern Europe
- Pharmacis castillana Oberthür 1883 – Spain
- Pharmacis claudiae Kristal & Hirneisen 1994 – Italy
- Pharmacis fusconebulosa De Geer 1778 (map-winged swift) – Europe
- Pharmacis pyrenaicus Donzel 1838 – Pyrenees
- Phymatopus hecta Linnaeus 1758 (gold swift) – Central and northern Europe
- Triodia adriaticus Osthelder 1931 – Croatia, North Macedonia, Greece, Crete
- Triodia amasinus Herrich-Schäffer 1851 – Balkans
- Triodia sylvina Linnaeus 1761 (orange swift) – Europe

== Generic checklist ==
- Fraus Walker, 1856
  - =Hectomanes Meyrick, 1980
  - =Praus; Pagenstacher, 1909
- Gazoryctra Hübner, [1820]
  - =Garzorycta; Hübner, [1826]
  - =Gazoryctes; Kirby, 1892
- Afrotheora Nielsen and Scoble, 1986
- Antihepialus Janse, 1942
  - =Ptycholoma; Felder, 1874
- Bipectilis Chus and Wang, 1985
- Palpifer Hampson, [1893]
  - =Palpiphorus; Quail, 1900
  - =Palpiphora; Pagenstacher, 1909
- Eudalaca Viette, 1950
  - =Eudalacina Paclt, 1953
- Gorgopis Hübner, [1820]
  - =Gorcopis; Walker, 1856
- Metahepialus Janse, 1942
- Dalaca Walker, 1856
  - =Huapina Bryk, 1945
  - =Maculella Viette, 1950
  - =Toenga Tindale, 1954
- Callipielus Butler, 1882
  - =Stachyocera Ureta, 1957
- Blanchardinella Nielsen, Robinson & Wagner, 2000
  - =Blanchardina Viette, 1950, nec Labbe, 1899
- Calada Nielsen and Robinson, 1983
- Puermytrans Viette, 1951
- Parapielus Viette, 1949
  - =Lossbergiana Viette, 1951
- Andeabatis Nielsen and Robinson, 1983
- Druceiella Viette, 1949
- Trichophassus Le Cerf, 1919
- Phassus Walker, 1856
- Schausiana Viette, 1950
- Aplatissa Viette, 1953
- Pfitzneriana Viette, 1952
- Cibyra Walker, 1856
- Cibyra (Pseudodalaca Viette, 1950)
- Cibyra (Gymelloxes Viette, 1952)
- Cibyra (Alloaepytus Viette, 1951)
- Cibyra (Aeptus) Herrich-Schäffer, [1858]
- Cibyra (Thiastyx Viette, 1951)
- Cibyra (Schaefferiana Viette, 1950)
- Cibyra (Paragorgopis Viette, 1952)
- Cibyra (Hepialyxodes Viette, 1951)
- Cibyra (Xytrops Viette, 1951)
- Cibyra (Cibyra Walker, 1856)
- Cibyra (Lamelliformia Viette, 1952)
- Cibyra (Tricladia Felder, 1874)
  - =Pseudophassus Pfitzner, 1914
  - =Parana Viette, 1950
- Cibyra (Pseudophilaenia Viette, 1951)
- Cibyra (Philoenia Kirby, 1892)
  - =Philaenia auctt.
- Cibyra (Yleuxas Viette, 1951)
- Phialuse Viette, 1961
- Roseala Viette, 1950
- Dalaca auctt., nec Walker, 1856
- Pfitzneriella Viette, 1951
- Aoraia Dumbleton, 1966
  - =Trioxycanus Dumbleton, 1966
- Triodia
  - =Alphus Wallengren, 1869, nec Dejean, 1833
- Korscheltellus Börner, 1920
- Pharmacis Hübner, [1820]
- Thitarodes Viette, 1968
  - =Forkalus Chu and Wang, 1985
- Phymatopus Wallengren, 1869
  - =Hepiolopsis Börner, 1920
  - =Phimatopus; auctt.
- Phymatopus auctt. nec Wallengren, 1869
- Hepialus Fabricius, 1775
  - =Hepiolus Illiger, 1801
  - =Epialus Agassiz, 1847
  - =Epiolus Agassiz, 1847
  - =Tephus Wallengren, 1869
  - =Trepialus; Latreille, [1805]
- Zenophassus Tindale, 1941
- Sthenopis auctt. nec Packard, [1865]
- Endoclita; Felder, 1874
  - =Endoclyta, Felder, 1875
  - =Hypophassus, Le Cerf, 1919
  - =Nevina, Tindale, 1941
  - =Sahyadrassus, Tindale, 1941
  - =Procharagia, Viette, 1949
- Neohepialiscus Viette, 1948
- Elhamma Walker, 1856
  - =Perissectis Meyrick, 1890
  - =Pericentris; Pagenstacher, 1909
  - =Zauxieus Viette, 1952
  - =Theaxieus Viette, 1952
- Jeana Tindale, 1935
- Cladoxycanus Dumbleton, 1966
- Wiseana Viette, 1961
  - =Porina Walker, 1956, nec d'Orbigny, 1852
  - =Gorina; Quail, 1899
  - =Goryna; Quail, 1899
  - =Philpottia Viette, 1950, nec Broun, 1915
- Heloxycanus Dugdale, 1994
- Dumbletonius; auctt
  - =Trioxycanus Dumbleton, 1966
- Dioxycanus Dumbleton, 1966
- Napialus Chu and Wang, 1985
- Hepialiscus Hampson, [1893]
- Parahepialiscus Viette, 1950
- Xhoaphryx Viette, 1953
- Aenetus Herrich-Schäffer, [1858]
  - =Charagia Walker, 1856
  - =Phloiopsyche Scott, 1864
  - =Oenetus; Kirby, 1892
  - =Choragia; Pagenstacher, 1909
  - =Oenetes; Oke, 1953
- Leto Hübner, [1820]
  - =Ecto; Pagenstacher, 1909
- Zelotypia Scott, 1869
  - =Xylopsyche Swainson, 1851
  - =Leto; auctt
- Oncopera
  - =Oncoptera Walker, 1890
  - =Paroncopera Tindale, 1933
  - =Onchopera; Birket-Smith, 1974
  - =Onchoptera; Birket-Smith, 1974
- Trictena Meyrick, 1890
- Bordaia Tindale, 1932
  - =Bordaja; Chu and Wang, 1985
- Abantiades Herrich-Schäffer, [1858]
  - =Pielus Walker, 1856
  - =Rhizopsyche Scott, 1864
- Oxycanus Walker, 1856
  - =Porina Walker, 1856
  - =Gorina; Quail, 1899
  - =Goryna; Quail, 1899
  - =Paraoxyxanus Viette, 1950
- Phassodes Bethune-Baker, 1905
