= A. fulvomarginatus =

A. fulvomarginatus may refer to:

- Abacetus fulvomarginatus, a ground beetle
- Abantiades fulvomarginatus, a moth found in Australia
