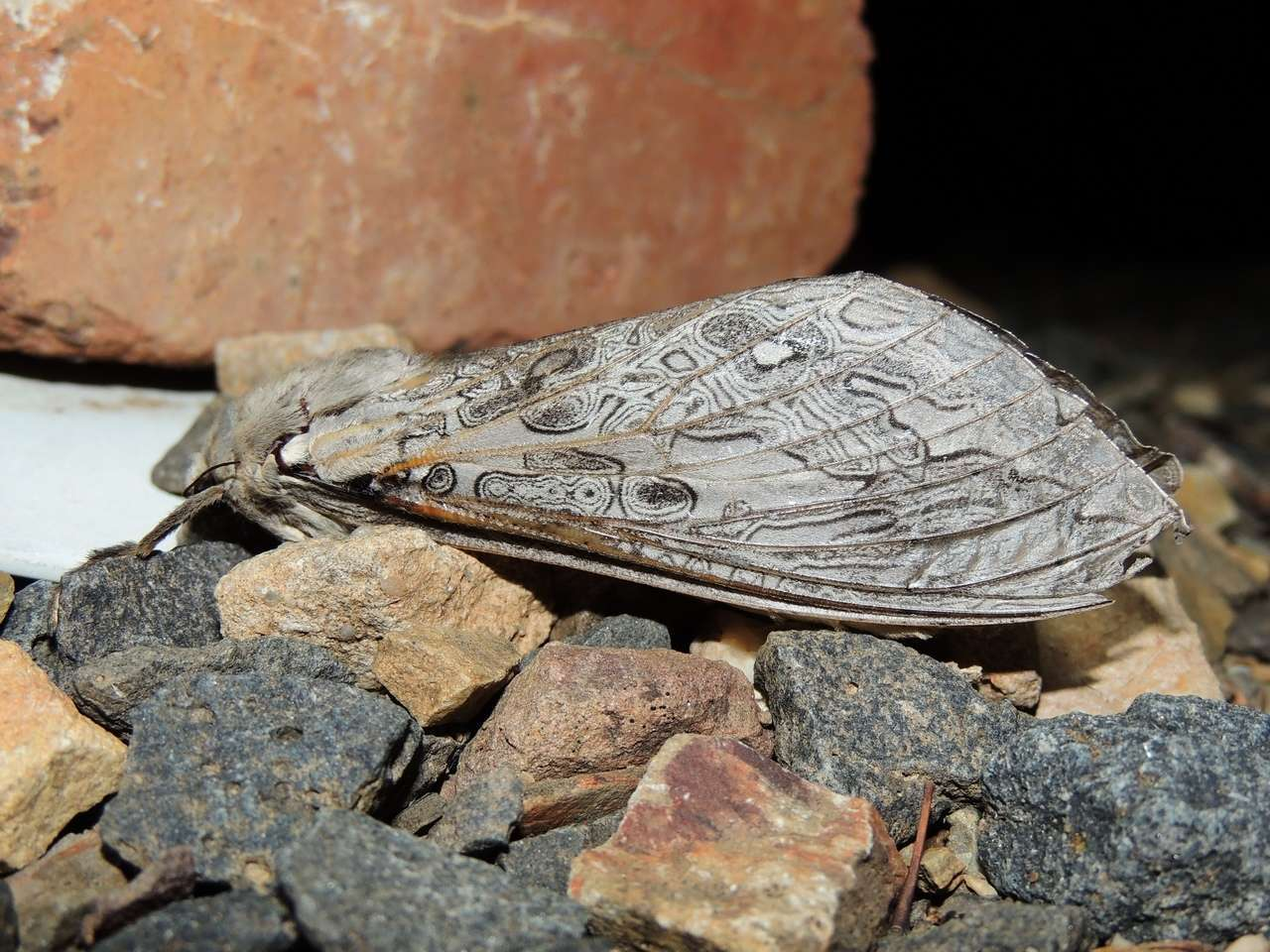

Scientific classification
- Kingdom: Animalia
- Phylum: Arthropoda
- Clade: Pancrustacea
- Class: Insecta
- Order: Lepidoptera
- Family: Hepialidae
- Genus: Abantiades
- Species: A. marcidus

Binomial name
- Abantiades marcidus Tindale, 1932

= Abantiades marcidus =

Species of moth

Abantiades marcidus is a moth of the family Hepialidae. It is endemic to Australia, where it is found in New South Wales, Queensland, South Australia and Victoria. The larvae are a favoured bait for fishing.
