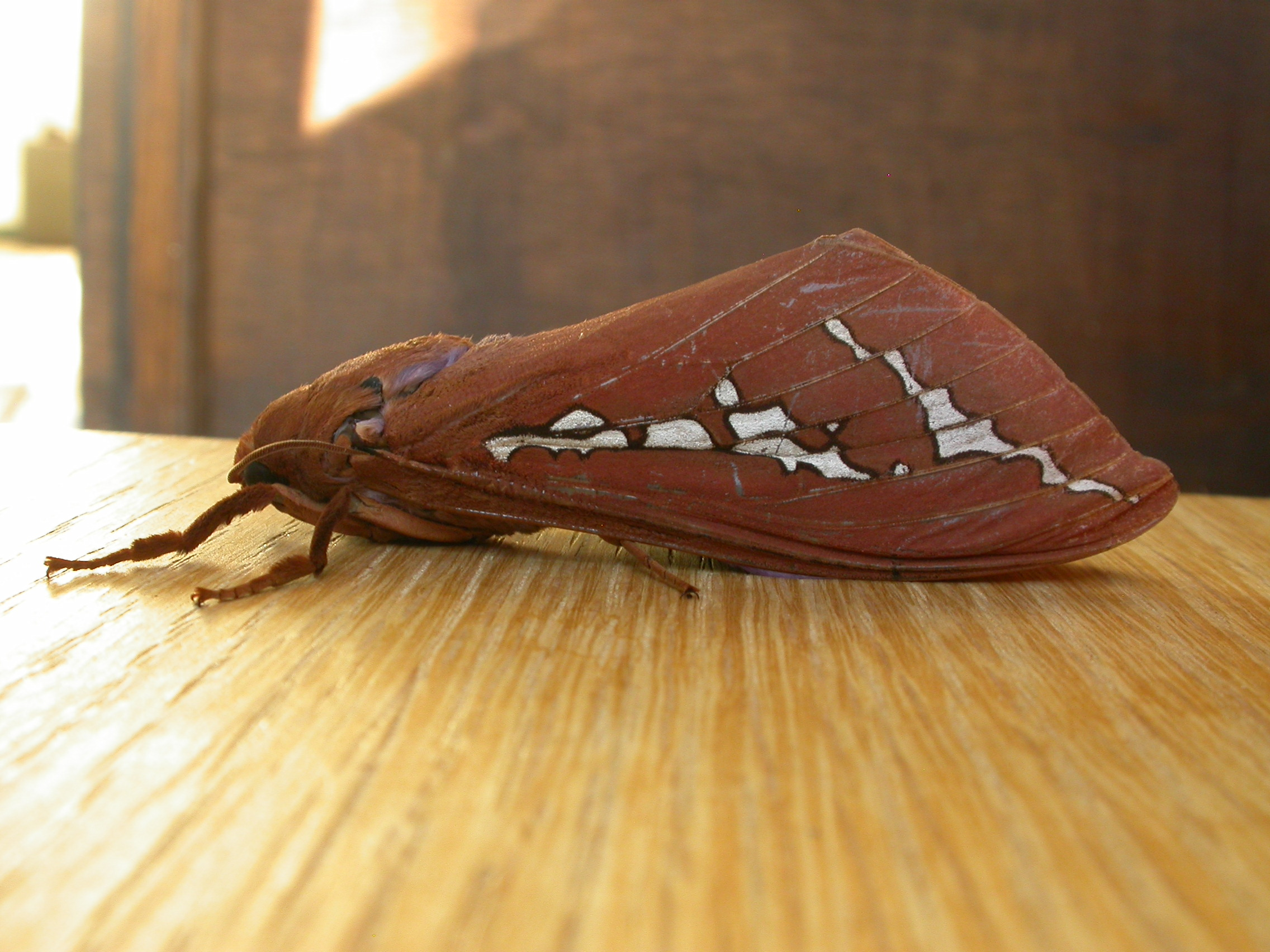
- Abantiades hyalinatus

Scientific classification
- Kingdom: Animalia
- Phylum: Arthropoda
- Class: Insecta
- Order: Lepidoptera
- Family: Hepialidae
- Genus: Abantiades; Herrich-Schäffer, [1855]

Species
- See text.

Synonyms
- Pielus Walker, 1856; Rhizopsyche Scott, 1864; Trictena Meyrick, 1890; Bordaia Tindale, 1932

= Abantiades =

Genus of moths in family Hepialidae

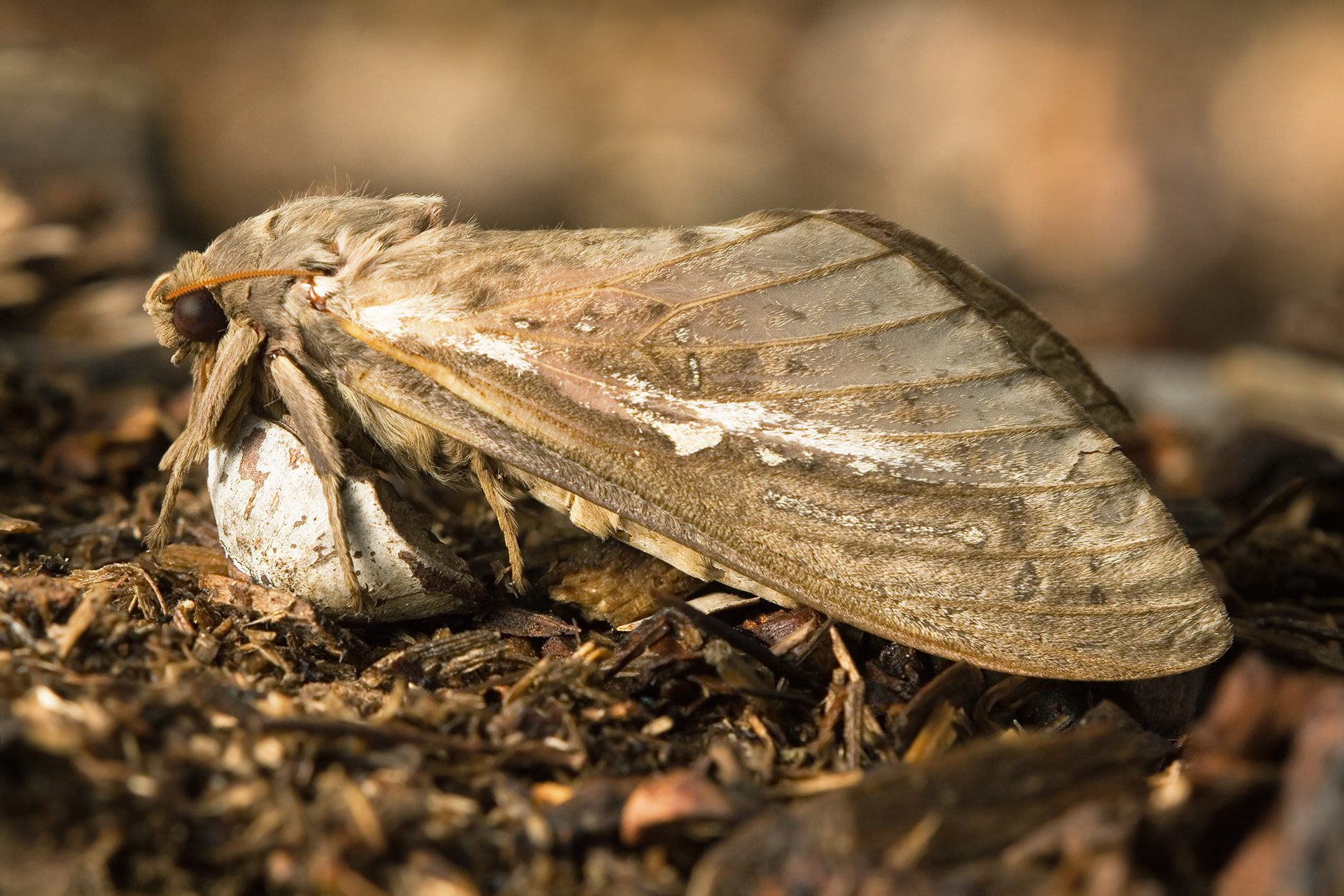
Pindi moth (A. latipennis), Tasmania

Abantiades is a genus of moths of the family Hepialidae. There are 37 described species, all found exclusively in Australia. The group includes some large species with a wingspan of up to 160 mm. The larvae feed on the roots of Eucalyptus and other trees. Simonsen's 2018 revision of the Australian Hepialidae synonymized the genera Bordaia and Trictena to Abantiades, and included the former genera's species here.

The Pindi moth (A. latipennis) is an abundant species of the eucalypt forests of Tasmania and, unlike many invertebrate species, appears to adapt well to the controversial forestry practice of clearfelling.

== Species ==
Abantiades includes the following species:

- Abantiades albofasciatus
- Abantiades aphenges
- Abantiades argyrosticha
- Abantiades atripalpis
- Abantiades aurilegulus
- Abantiades barcas
- Abantiades barnardi
- Abantiades concordia
- Abantiades fulvomarginatus
- Abantiades hyalinatus (southern Queensland to Tasmania)
- Abantiades hydrographus
- Abantiades labyrinthicus (east coast, southern Queensland to Tasmania)
- Abantiades latipennis - Pindi moth (Victoria and Tasmania)
- Abantiades leucochiton
- Abantiades magnificus (eastern Victoria and New South Wales)
- Abantiades malleus
- Abantiades marcidus
- Abantiades ocellatus
- Abantiades penneshawensis
- Abantiades sericatus
