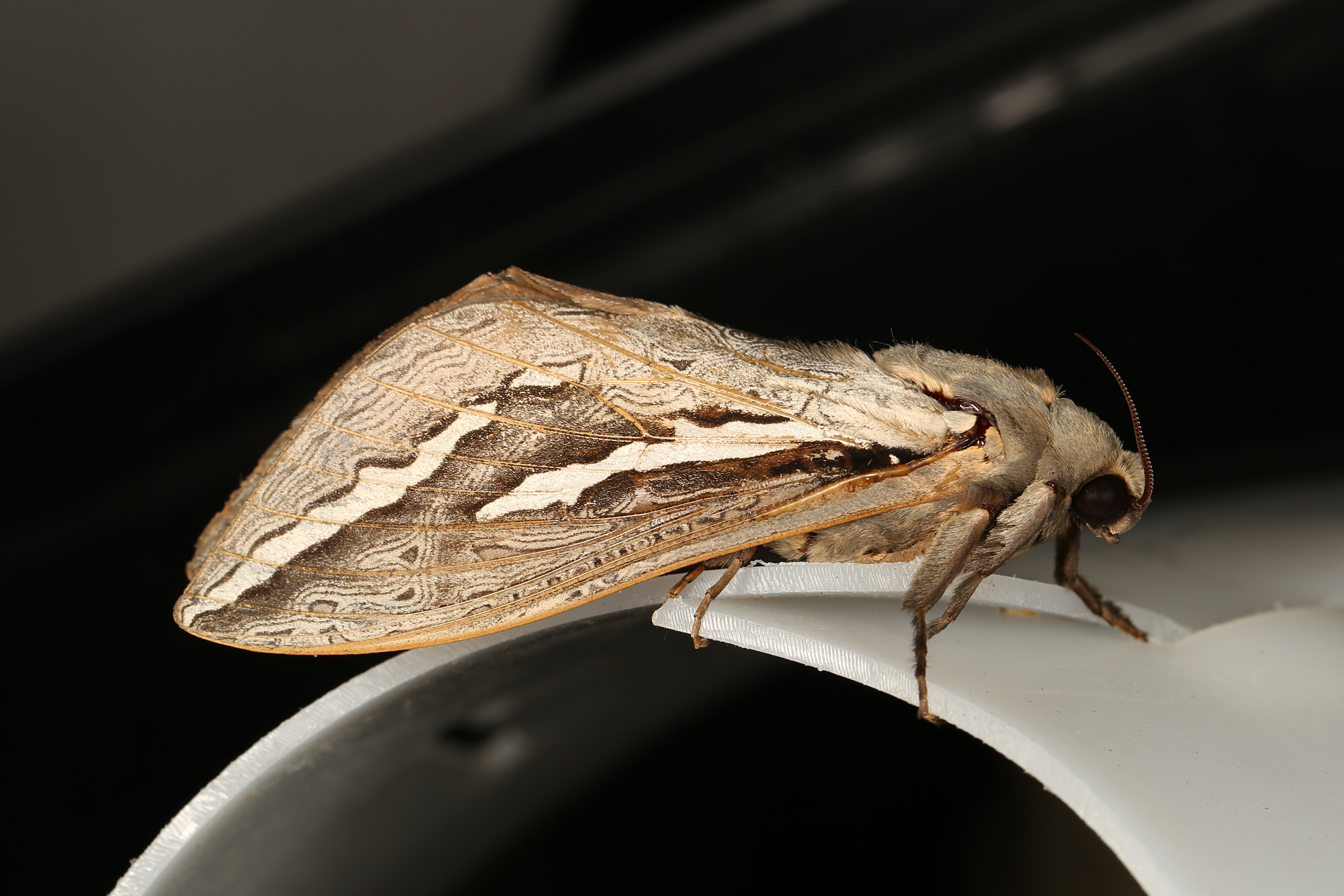

Scientific classification
- Kingdom: Animalia
- Phylum: Arthropoda
- Clade: Pancrustacea
- Class: Insecta
- Order: Lepidoptera
- Family: Hepialidae
- Genus: Abantiades
- Species: A. labyrinthicus

Binomial name
- Abantiades labyrinthicus (Donovan, 1805)

Synonyms
- Cossus labyrinthicus Donovan, 1805; Cossus argenteus Donovan, 1805; Pielus tasmaniae Walker, 1856; Pielus swainsoni Scott, 1864; Pielus diversata Lucas, 1898

= Abantiades labyrinthicus =

Species of moth

Abantiades labyrinthicus is a moth of the family Hepialidae. It is endemic to Australia, where it is found in the Australian Capital Territory, New South Wales, Queensland, Tasmania and Victoria.

The wingspan is about 100 mm for males and 160 mm for females. The forewings are brown with two silver flashes.

The larvae are subterranean and feed on the roots of various trees, possibly including Eucalyptus species.
