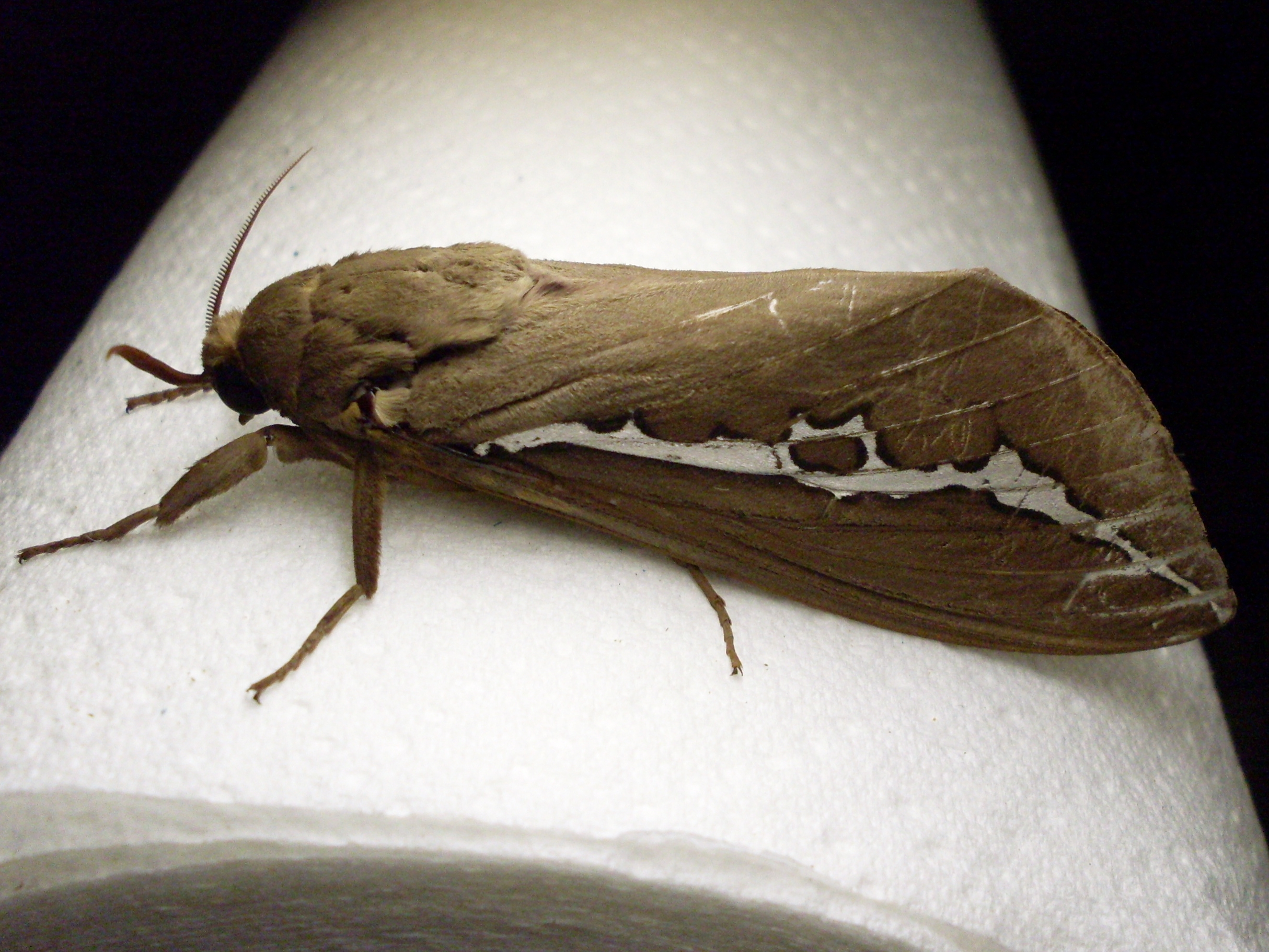

Scientific classification
- Domain: Eukaryota
- Kingdom: Animalia
- Phylum: Arthropoda
- Class: Insecta
- Order: Lepidoptera
- Family: Hepialidae
- Genus: Abantiades
- Species: A. barcas

Binomial name
- Abantiades barcas (Pfitzner, 1914)

Synonyms
- Pielus barcas Pfitzner, 1914

= Abantiades barcas =

Species of moth

Abantiades barcas is a moth of the family Hepialidae. It is endemic to the Australian Capital Territory, New South Wales and Queensland.

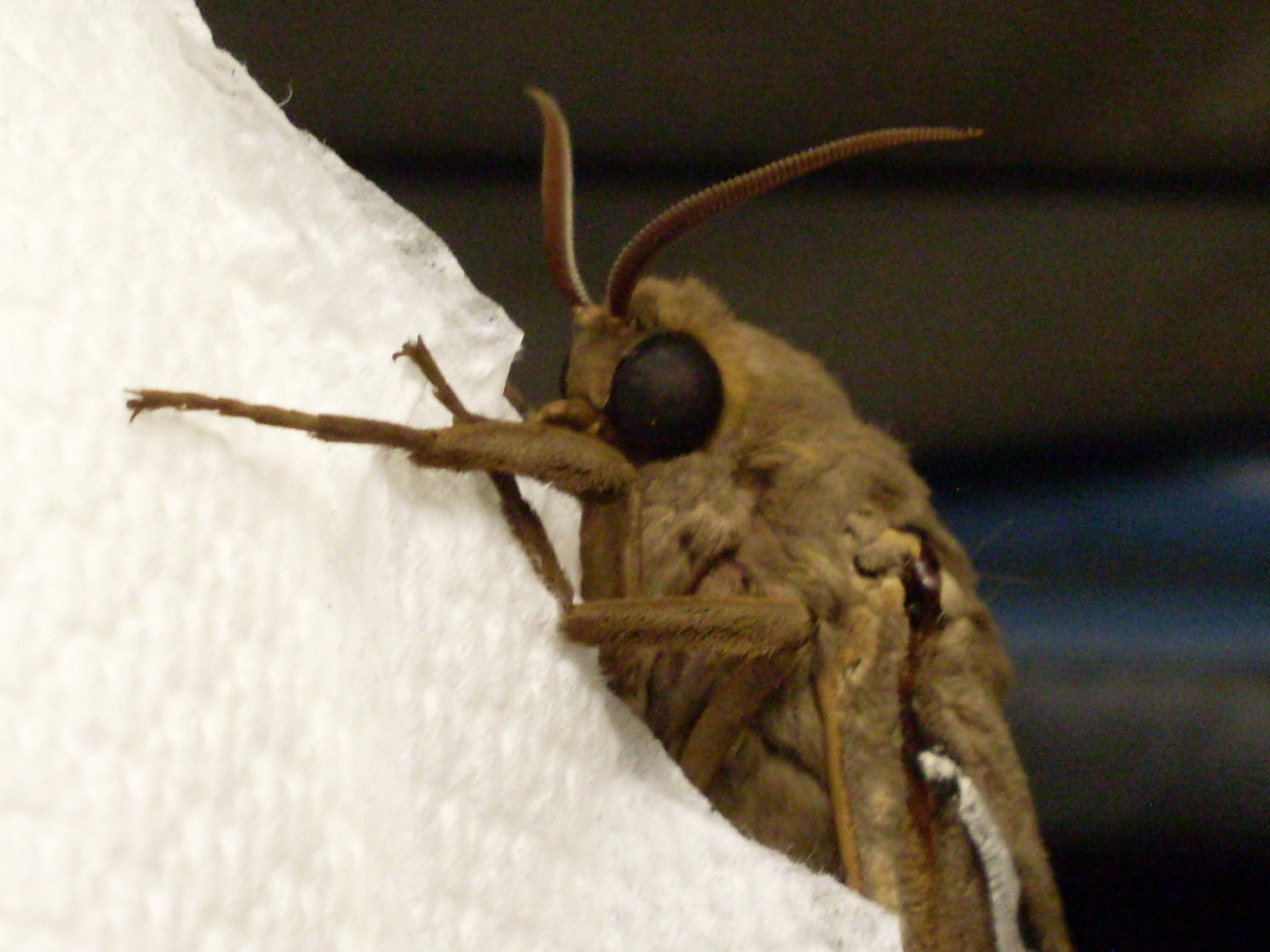
