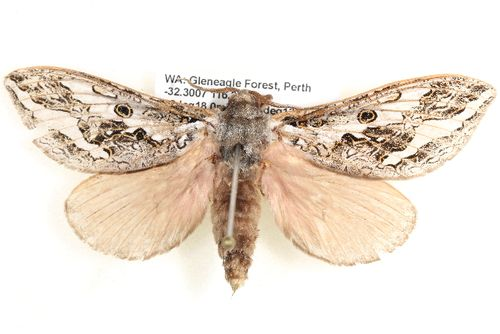
- Centre for Biodiversity Genomics BIOUG12060-G12
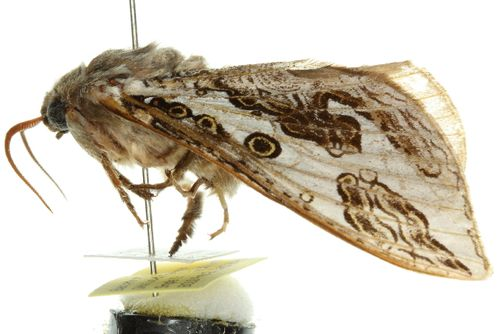
- ANICM694-10 Lateral

Scientific classification
- Kingdom: Animalia
- Phylum: Arthropoda
- Clade: Pancrustacea
- Class: Insecta
- Order: Lepidoptera
- Family: Hepialidae
- Genus: Abantiades
- Species: A. ocellatus

Binomial name
- Abantiades ocellatus Tindale, 1932

= Abantiades ocellatus =

Species of moth

Abantiades ocellatus is a moth of the family Hepialidae. It is endemic to Western Australia.

It was first described in 1932 by Norman Tindale.
