= Abantiades albofasciatus =

Scientific classification
- Kingdom: Animalia
- Phylum: Arthropoda
- Clade: Pancrustacea
- Class: Insecta
- Order: Lepidoptera
- Family: Hepialidae
- Genus: Abantiades
- Species: A. albofasciatus

Binomial name
- Abantiades albofasciatus (C. Swinhoe, 1892)

Synonyms
- Pielus albofasciatus C. Swinhoe, 1892

Species of moth

Abantiades albofasciatus is a moth of the family Hepialidae. It is endemic to Western Australia. It was first described in 1892 as Pielus albofasciatus by Charles Swinhoe.

== Description ==
The head, thorax, and forewings are a brown tinged with pink. The hindwings and the abdomen are grey, and are both covered with white hairs. The legs are greyish brown, but pinkish below. The antennae are dark brown. Each forewing has a ragged white stripe from base to margin, a thin submarginal white line, and various faint labyrinthine markings. The males' wingspan is about 10 centimetres (4 in), the females' about 15 centimetres (6 in). The female is similar to the male, but with more conspicuous wing markings.

=== Specimen image ===
See the Australian National Insect Collection: Specimen 10ANIC-09721 collected at Regan Ford, Western Australia by S. Cotter and K. Detchon on 29 April 2004.

== Taxonomy ==
A. albofasciatus was first described as Pielus albofasciatus by Charles Swinhoe in 1892, and this was revised by Norman Tindale in 1932 to Abantiades albofasciatus.
