= Abantiades aurilegulus =

Scientific classification
- Kingdom: Animalia
- Phylum: Arthropoda
- Clade: Pancrustacea
- Class: Insecta
- Order: Lepidoptera
- Family: Hepialidae
- Genus: Abantiades
- Species: A. aurilegulus

Binomial name
- Abantiades aurilegulus Tindale, 1932

Species of moth

Abantiades aurilegulus is a moth of the family Hepialidae. It is native to Western Australia.

It was first described in 1932 by Norman Tindale.
