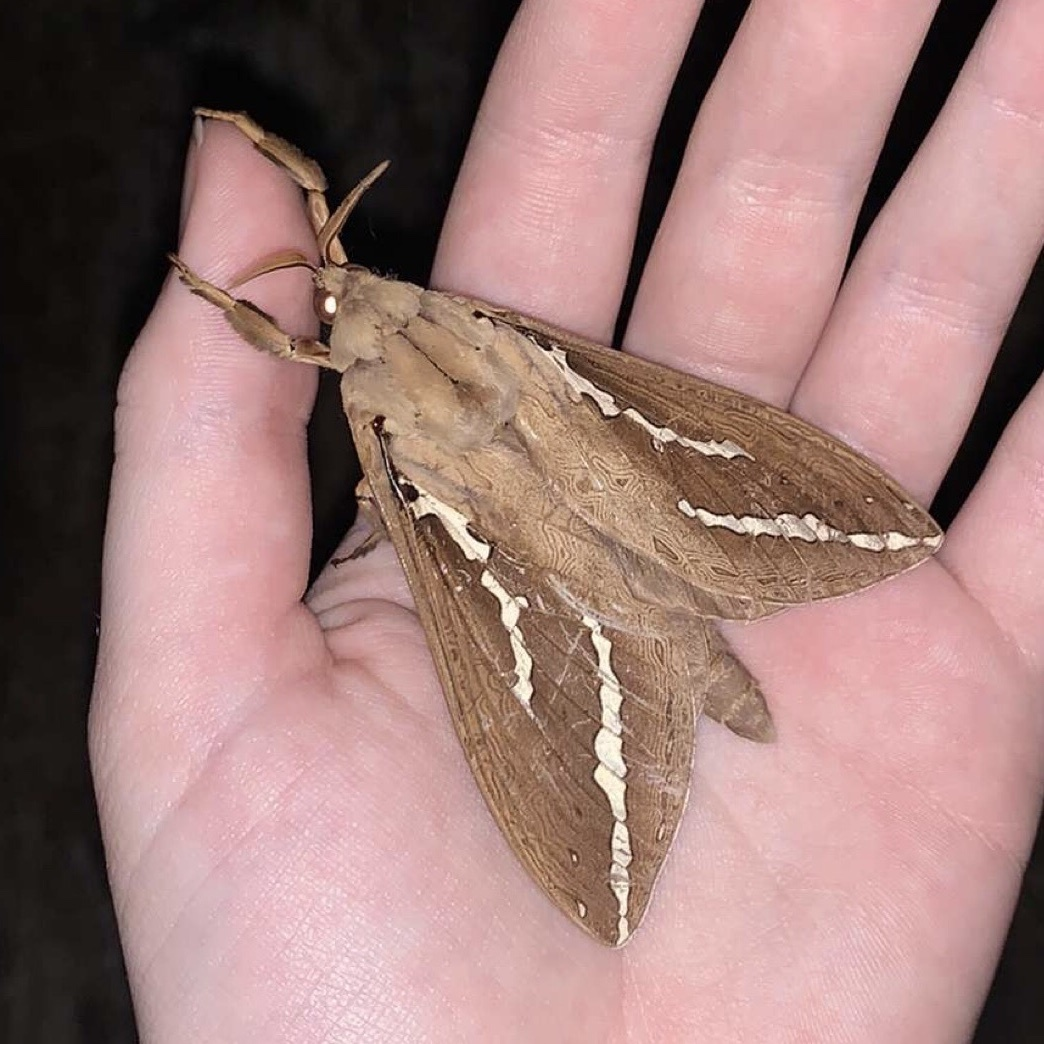
- Abantiades argyrosticha, Australia

Scientific classification
- Kingdom: Animalia
- Phylum: Arthropoda
- Clade: Pancrustacea
- Class: Insecta
- Order: Lepidoptera
- Family: Hepialidae
- Genus: Abantiades
- Species: A. argyrosticha

Binomial name
- Abantiades argyrosticha (Turner, 1929)

Synonyms
- Trictena argyrosticha Turner, 1929

= Abantiades argyrosticha =

Species of moth

Abantiades argyrosticha is a species of moth of the family Hepialidae. It was described by Alfred Jefferis Turner in 1929 (as Trictena argyrosticha), and is endemic to New South Wales and Queensland.

The wingspan is about 100 mm.

The larvae live underground, where they feeds on the roots of various trees, including Casuarina and Eucalyptus species.
