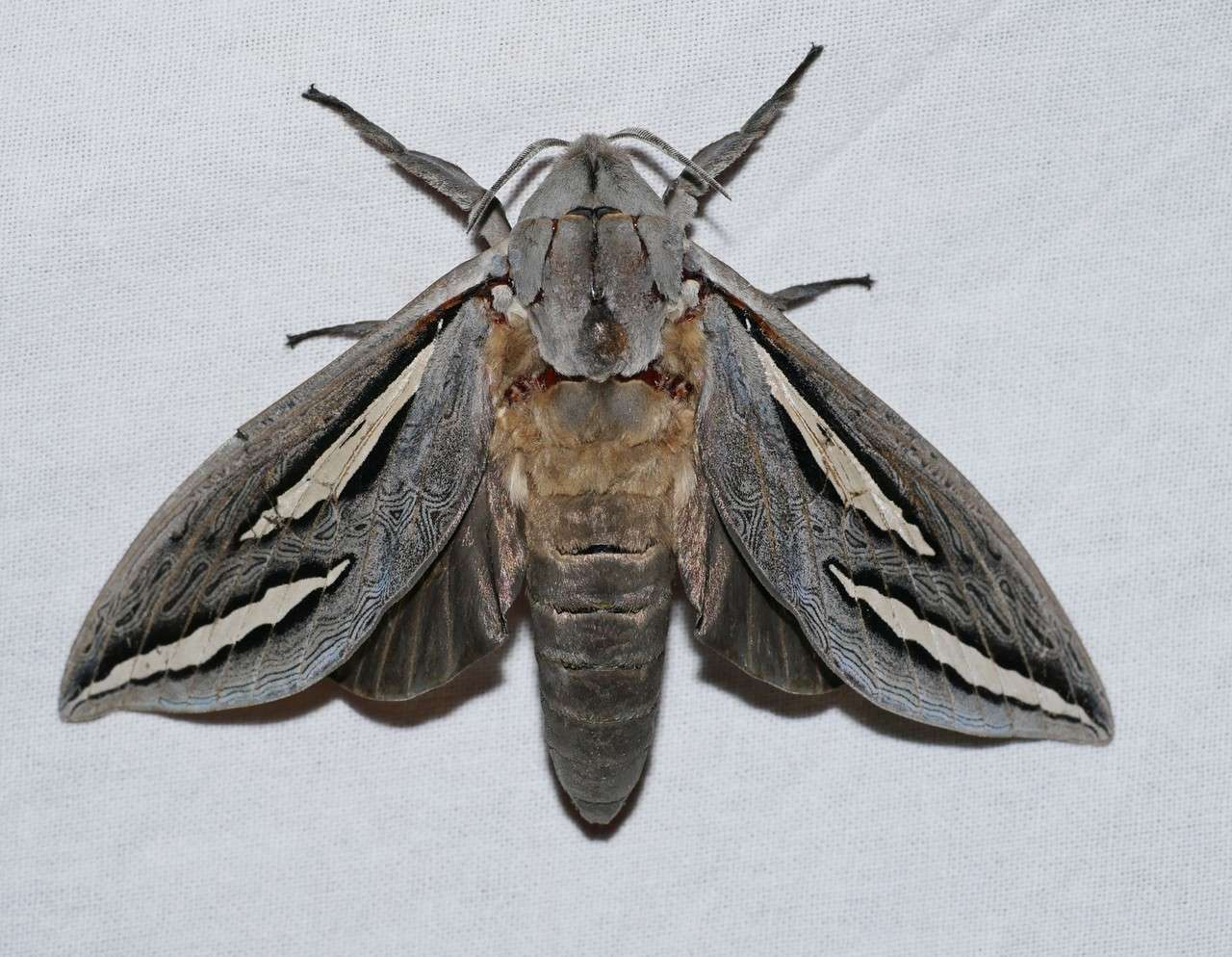

Scientific classification
- Domain: Eukaryota
- Kingdom: Animalia
- Phylum: Arthropoda
- Class: Insecta
- Order: Lepidoptera
- Family: Hepialidae
- Genus: Abantiades
- Species: A. magnificus

Binomial name
- Abantiades magnificus T.P. Lucas, 1898

Synonyms
- Pielus magnificus

= Abantiades magnificus =

Species of moth

Abantiades magnificus is a moth of the family Hepialidae. It is found in southern New South Wales and eastern Victoria.

The wingspan is about 12 cm.
