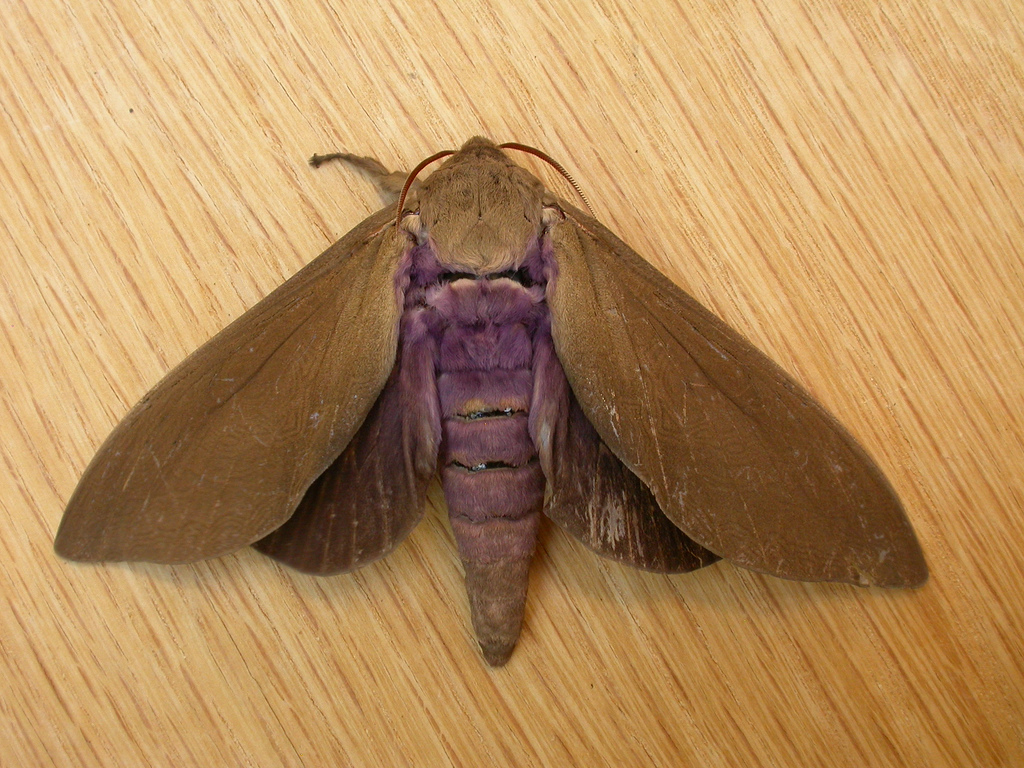

Scientific classification
- Domain: Eukaryota
- Kingdom: Animalia
- Phylum: Arthropoda
- Class: Insecta
- Order: Lepidoptera
- Family: Hepialidae
- Genus: Abantiades
- Species: A. hyalinatus

Binomial name
- Abantiades hyalinatus Herrich-Schäffer, 1853

Synonyms
- Pielus erythrinus

= Abantiades hyalinatus =

Species of moth

Abantiades hyalinatus is a moth of the family Hepialidae. It is found in Australia, from southern Queensland to Tasmania.

The wingspan is 10–12 cm.

== Gallery ==
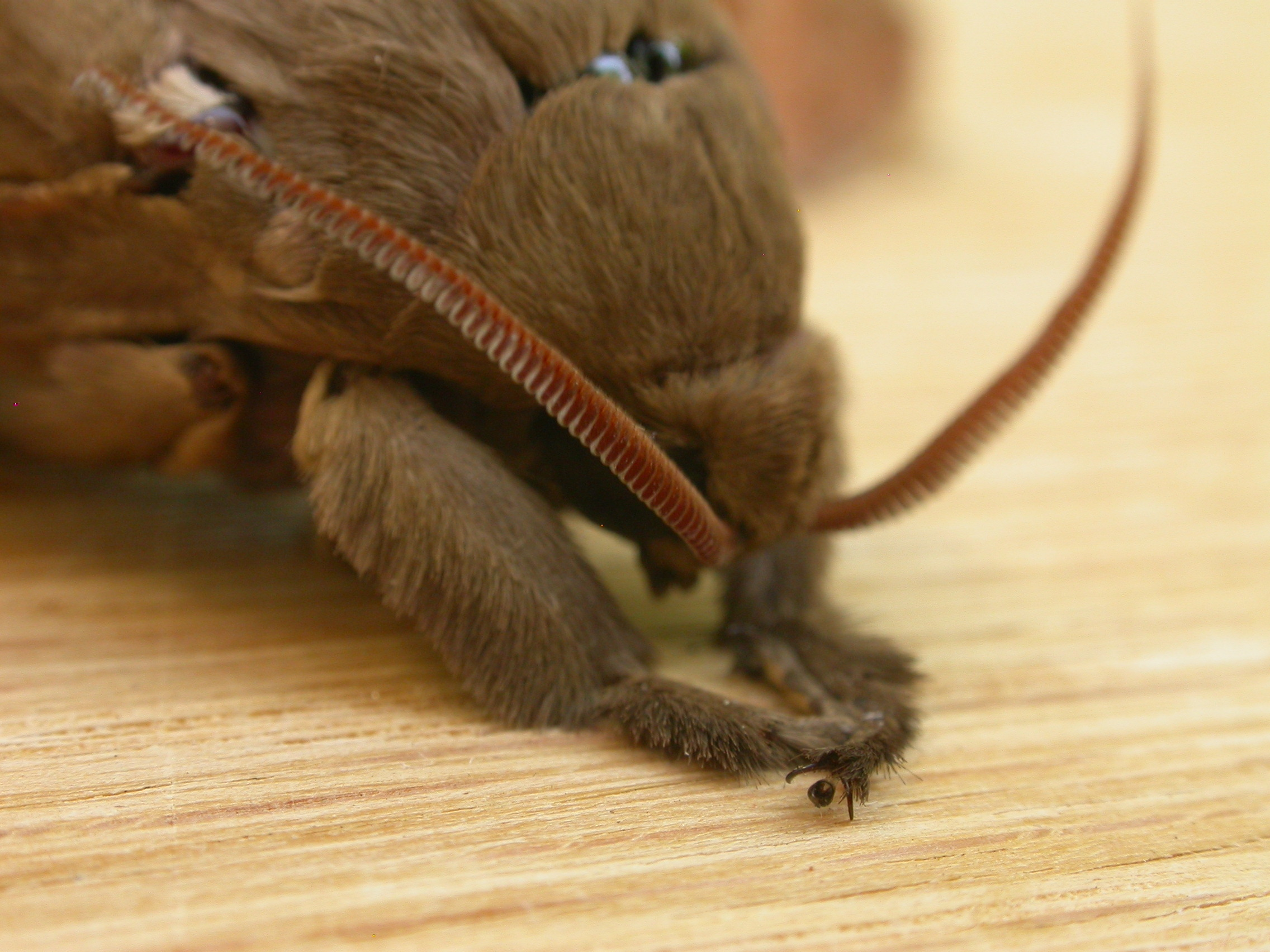

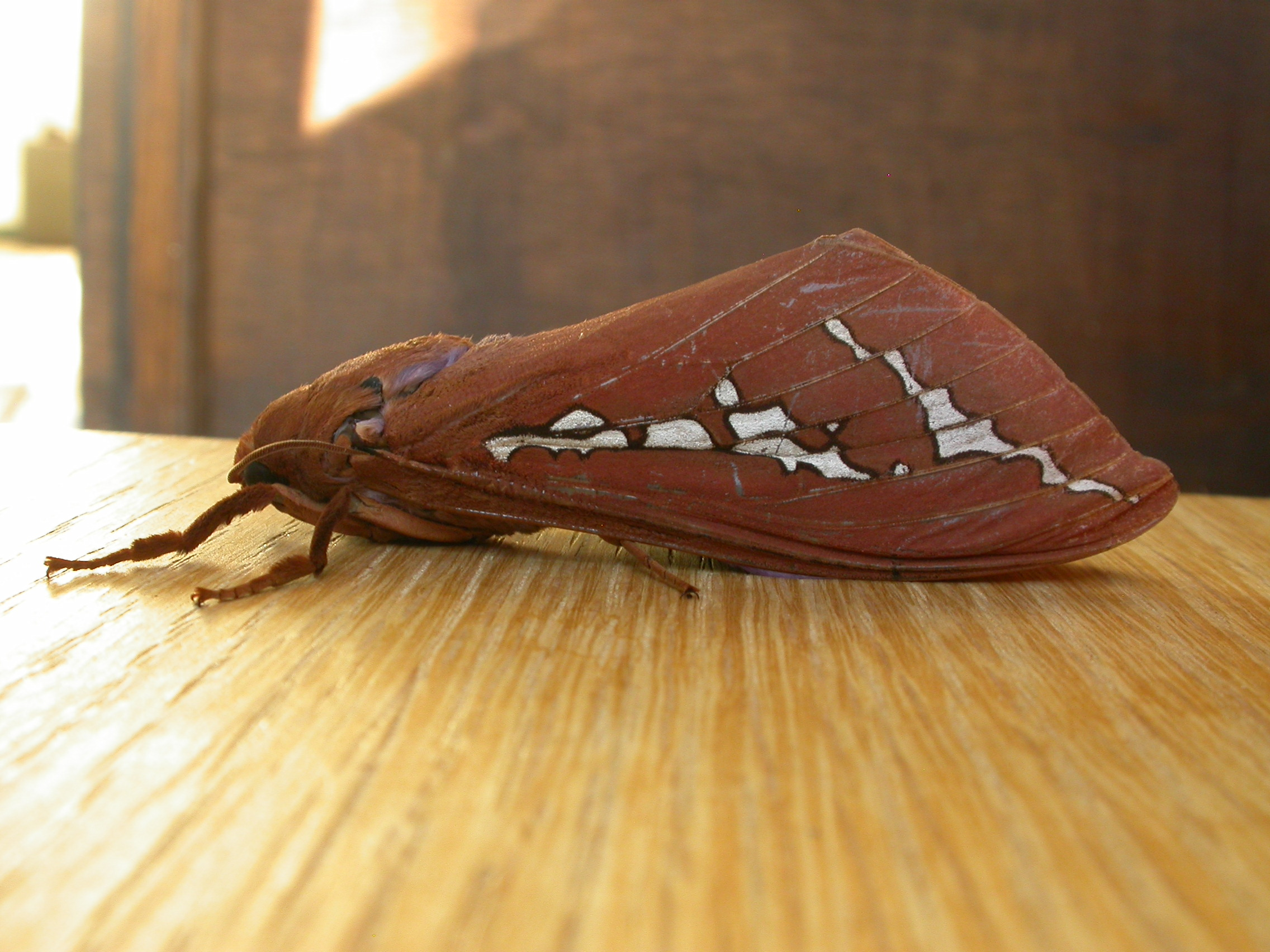

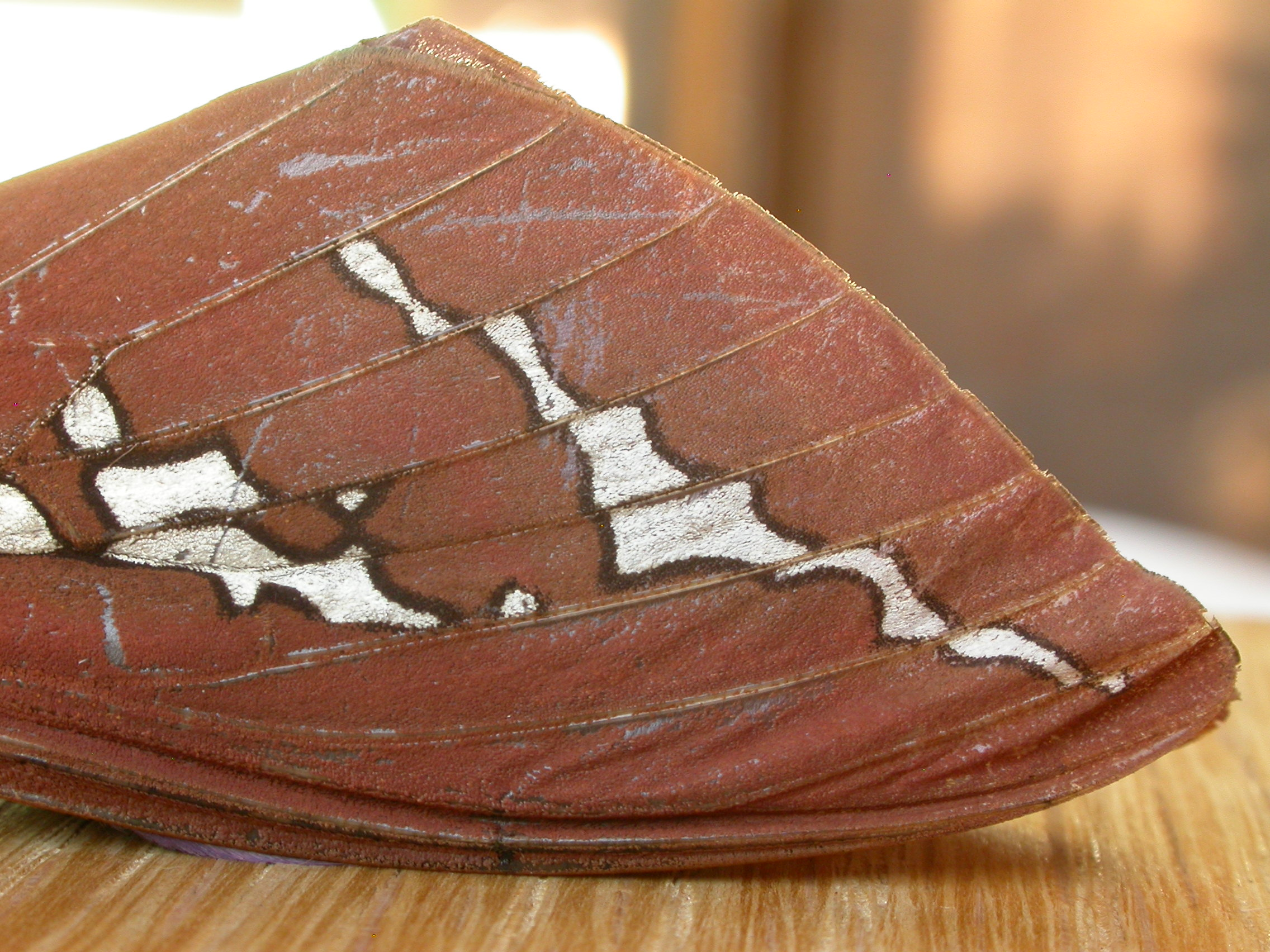

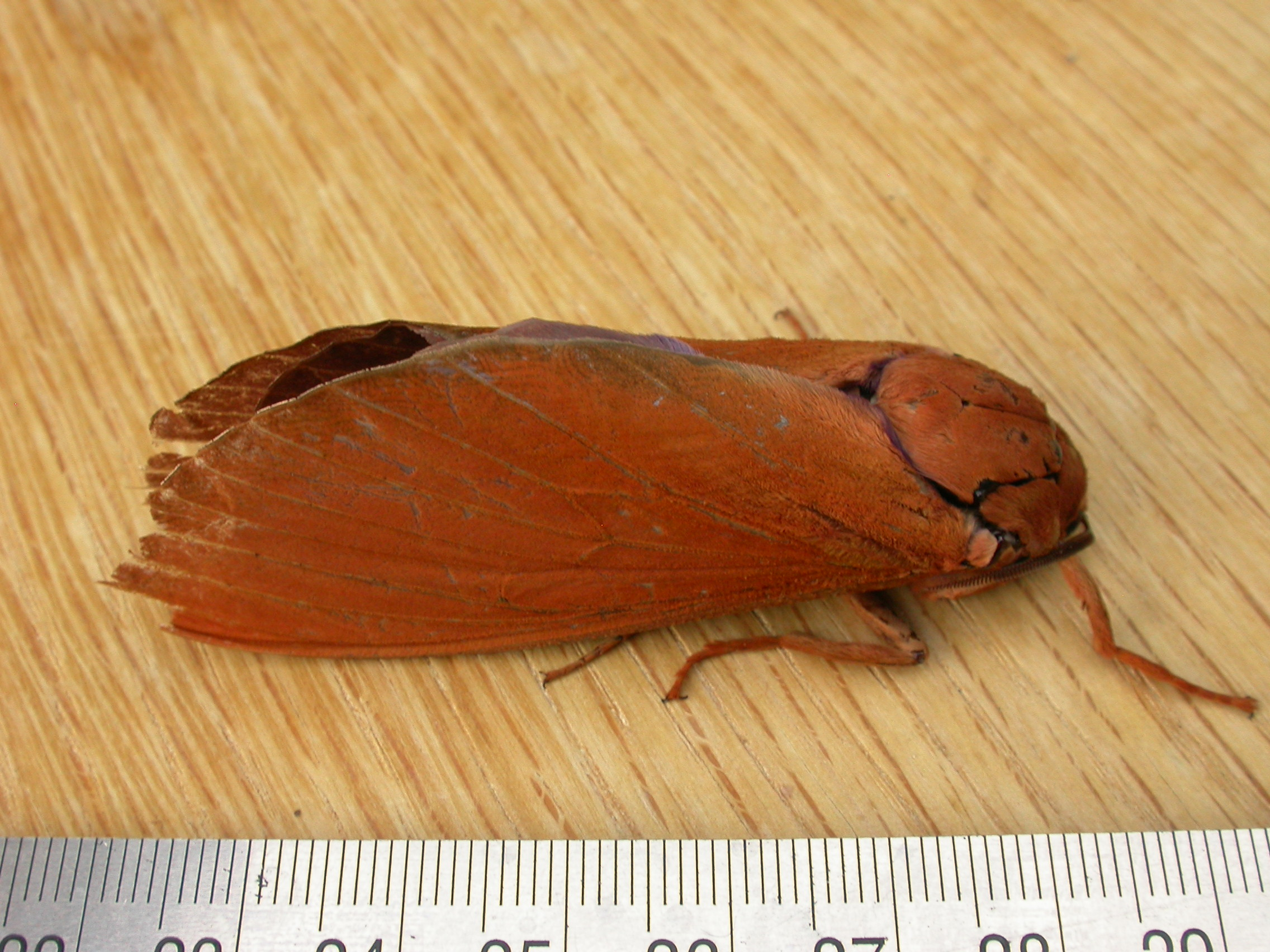
