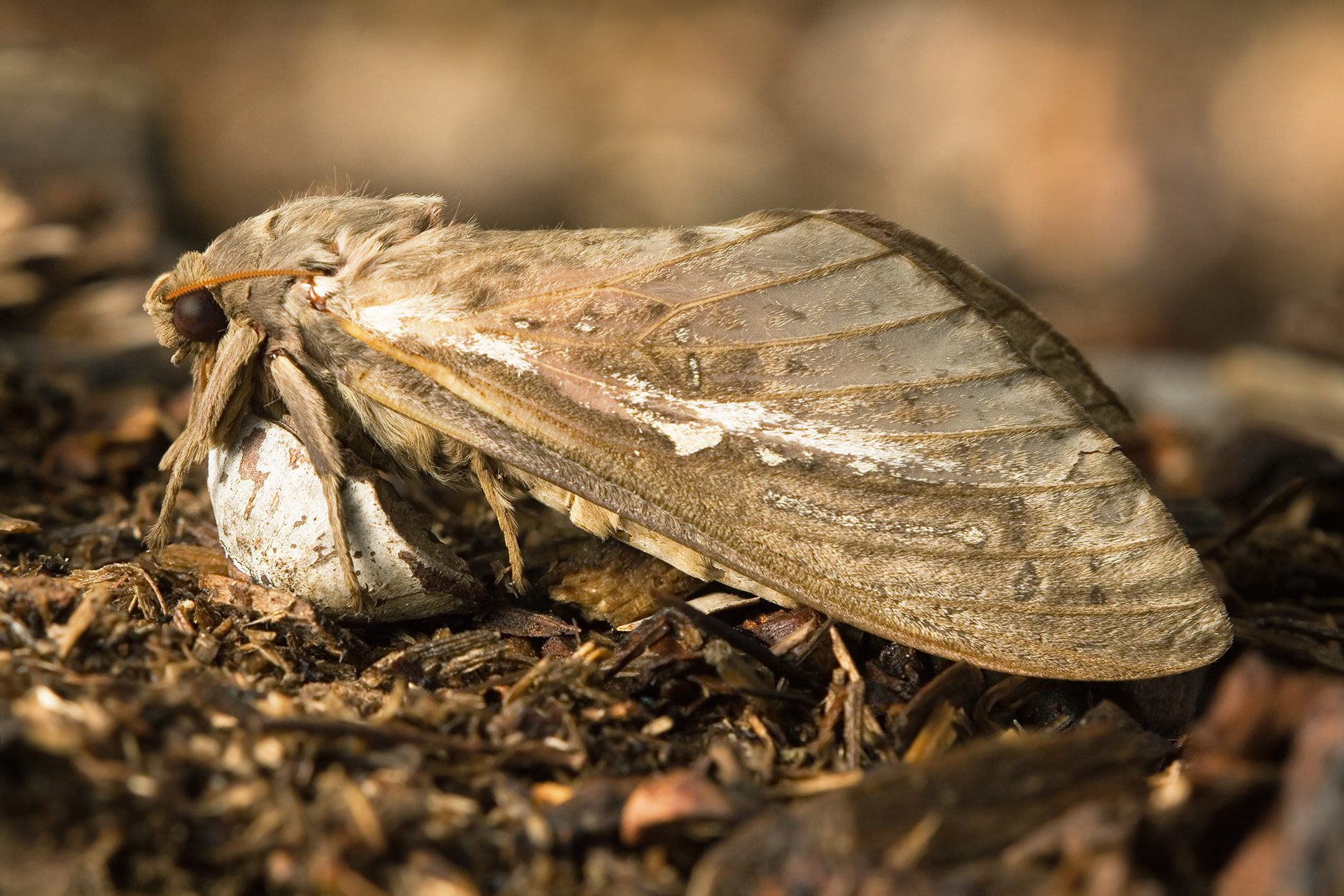

Scientific classification
- Kingdom: Animalia
- Phylum: Arthropoda
- Clade: Pancrustacea
- Class: Insecta
- Order: Lepidoptera
- Family: Hepialidae
- Genus: Abantiades
- Species: A. latipennis

Binomial name
- Abantiades latipennis Tindale, 1932

= Abantiades latipennis =

Species of moth

Abantiades latipennis, known as the Pindi moth, is a species of moth in the family Hepialidae. It may also be referred to as a swift moth or a ghost moth, as this is a common name associated with Hepialidae. Endemic to Australia and identified in 1932, it is most populous in temperate rainforest where eucalypti are prevalent, as the larvae feed primarily on the roots of these trees. Females lay eggs during flight in a scattering fashion. The larvae live for over eighteen months underground, while adult moths survive for approximately one week, as they have no mouthparts with which to feed. The moths are preyed upon by a number of predators, including bats and owls. Brown in colour overall, males are paler and the identifying silver bars of the male's wings are more prominent than those of the female's, with dark margins. Male adults are generally smaller.

Established clearfelling practices have been shown to favour the Pindi moth, and could lead to it being considered a pest due to opportunistic proliferation of the species. The resulting damage caused to the trees on which it feeds may be considered significant.

== Taxonomy and naming ==
Abantiades latipennis is one of fourteen species currently identified within the genus Abantiades, all of which are found exclusively in Australia. The species was first described in 1932 by Norman Tindale, an Australian entomologist and anthropologist. Tindale described the species, under its current name, but provided no etymology for the specific epithet latipennis. He based the species description on specimens from Lorne (including the holotype male and allotype female), Pomonal and Mount Mistake (in the Langi Ghiran State Park), Victoria, and from Zeehan, Eaglehawk Neck and Launceston, Tasmania.

Being a member of the Hepialiade family, A. latipennis is considered phylogenetically primitive, possessing several features that are indicative of earlier evolutionary development. The jugum on the forewings of the adult is an archaic wing coupling mechanism; further primitive characteristics include, as adults, the lack of mouthparts, large spacing between the fore- and hindwings, and the arrangement of the female genitalia.

== Distribution and habitat ==
A. latipennis is endemic to the Australasian region. More specifically, the moths inhabit New South Wales, Tasmania, Victoria, and Australian Capital Territory. As with other Abantiades species, the moth's habitat is temperate rainforest, both primary and secondary. During its larval stage, the moth feeds on the roots of trees, and its prospering is thought to have an economic impact on the timber industry.

== Life cycle and behaviour ==
Female moths "lay" their eggs by scattering them during flight; up to 10,000 eggs are released at once. Larvae then hatch from the eggs in the leaf litter on the forest floor and begin tunnelling, in search of suitable host roots. The number of instars and the period of the larval stage is yet unknown, with field observations suggesting a larval stage of more than eighteen months.

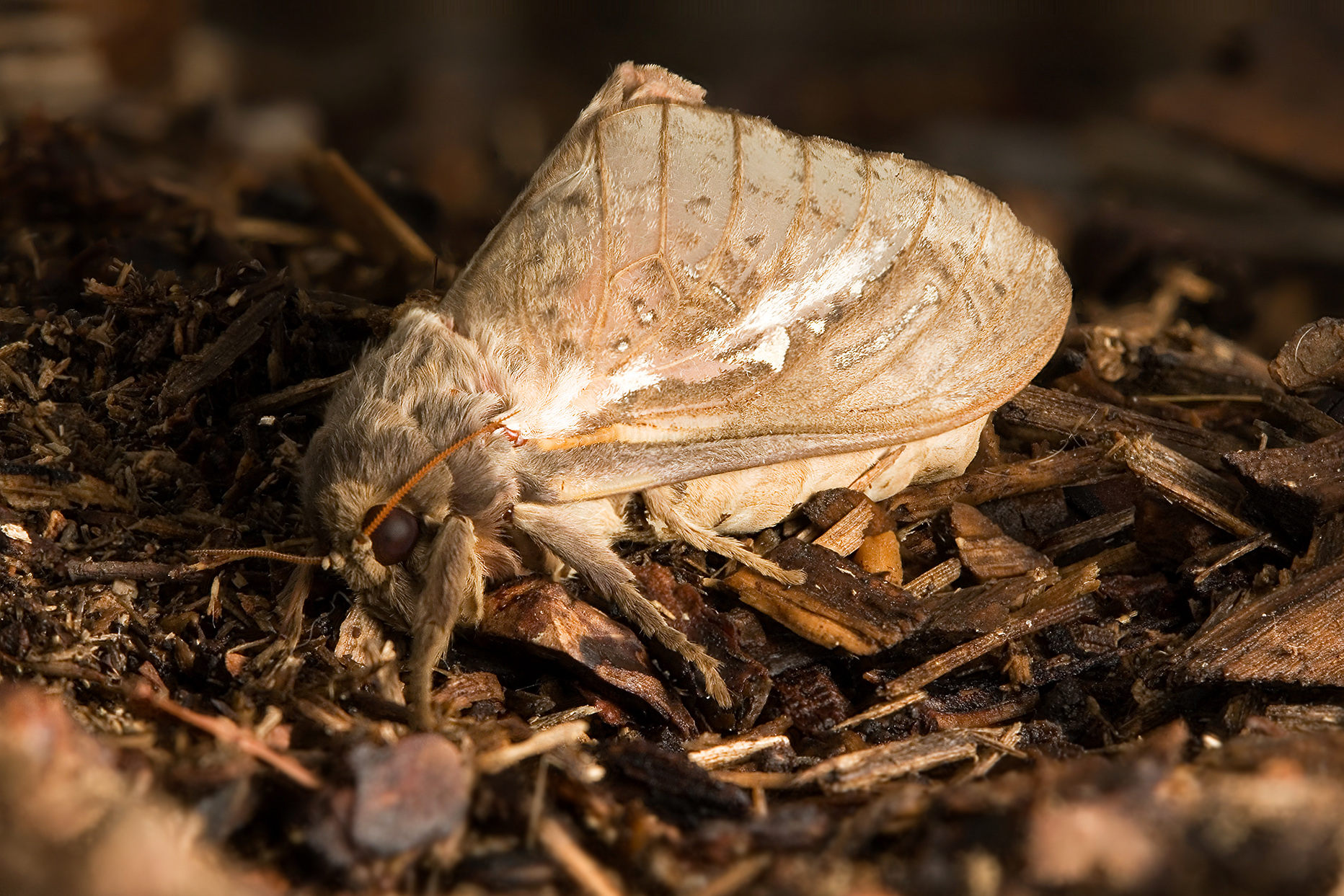
An adult Abantiades latipennis, possibly a female, photographed in Austins Ferry, Tasmania

The phytophagous larvae of A. latipennis feed primarily on the root systems of two species of tree, Eucalyptus obliqua (messmate stringybark) and Eucalyptus regnans (mountain ash). Both of these species are present in old growth forests and dominant in regrowth forests, contributing to the moth's success in its own habitat. Forming simple and vertical tunnels, lined with silk, the caterpillars are subterranean before and during pupation, emerging for their metamorphosis. The tunnel entrances, 6 to 10 millimetres in diameter, are covered with silk webbing and leaf litter, and can be up to 60 centimetres (2 ft) deep, although depth is more usually 12 to 35 cm.

By chewing the tap and lateral roots of trees, caterpillars feed on the cambium growth, produced by the tree at the site of the injury. The larvae may girdle a root, thereby causing its death, or the lesions may be only partial, allowing the root to continue functioning, albeit with some deformity.

The subterranean habitat of the larvae generally provides protection from predation, but the larvae are sometimes parasitised by tachina flies. The parasitoid larvae of the tachinid Rutilotrixa diversa, usually hosted by scarab beetles, have been discovered infecting A. latipennis.

Adult A. latipennis are crepuscular and males are strongly attracted to lights, forming leks at dusk, most notably after rains in autumn and late summer. Females use pheromones to attract males for mating. As a primitive species, they lack mouthparts as adults and are therefore unable to feed. Their lifespan as winged creatures is understandably short, lasting approximately a week, barring predation. Predation is commonly by bats, owls, and possums, though several other animals, from spiders to cats, occasionally consume them and contribute to the brief lifespan of the metamorphosed moths.

== Ecology ==
As part of a study measuring the impact that the practice of clearfelling has on biodiversity in the Weld Valley of Tasmania, it was found that A. latipennis was one of the few species that thrived in regrowth forests that were previously clearfelled. An earlier study, conducted in other regions of southern Tasmania, examined the relationship between the moth and Eucalyptus regnans and E. obliqua and reached the same conclusion. The tunnelling and feeding habit of A. latipennis larvae on the roots of these two eucalypt species is mostly responsible for its abundance in clearfelled forests, as the trees are the typical regrowth of logged areas. This success may also be due in part to the caterpillar's lack of dependence on decaying vegetation, a characteristic of the genus Abantiades and dissimilar to other Tasmanian genera—such as Eudonia and Barea—that have not fared as well in clearfelled forest.

The crowns of the eucalypts infected by A. latipennis have exhibited no consistent indication of root disturbance, with most trees studied appearing healthy and of average size for secondary forest. E. regnans and E. obliqua have demonstrated slow growth in regrowth stands, but this tendency has been attributed to significant root and crown competition. Some trees appeared chlorotic (a yellowing effect in plants, caused by a reduction in chlorophyll), but this was not a reliable indicator of root infestation, and may be the result of other influences. Well-established clearfelling practices in Tasmania could exacerbate the favouring of this species, and its proliferation could lead to extensive eucalypt damage and pest concerns, though the potential effect of this threat is as yet undetermined.

Lesions on the roots caused by the larval feeding provide ideal sites for the establishment of root rot-causing fungi, once the larvae depart the root system for pupation. Areas on the roots with past feeding damage were found to have Armillaria sp. flourishing in the lesions. In rarer cases, the pathogen Perenniporia medulla-panis was also found attacking the roots at the damaged locations. Other cases of decay and discolouration were noted, but attributed to unidentified microorganisms.

== Morphology and identification ==
A. latipennis larvae vary in size and colour during growth, but can be grouped small and large. The small caterpillars are generally 12 millimetres (0.47 inches) long and an overall milky grey, with a light brown head capsule that is about 3 mm (0.12 in) wide. Large caterpillars may be milky grey or a dark green-brown, 60 to 90 mm (2.4 to 3.5 in) long, with a 6 to 9 mm (0.24 to 0.35 in) wide brown head capsule.

Females are larger than males, with the wingspan of the male adult approximately 80 mm (3.1 in). A female specimen collected in 1979 had a wingspan of 108 mm (4.3 in), but Tindale recorded female wingspans at 150 mm (5.9 in) in 1932. The forewings of both males and females feature silvery-white bars, although the bars of the male moth's wings are more prominent and with dark margins. The female's body colour is usually a darker brown than the male's pale brown, as noted by Tindale, although a grey-brown female was collected in 1979.

Hepialidae have short, pectinate antennae and, unusually primitive for Lepidoptera, lack a functional proboscis or retinaculum and are therefore non-feeding. The moths possess several other morphological features that are considered phylogenetically primitive. The gap between the fore- and hindwing is distinct and the wings are covered in scale-like hairs. At the base of the forewing is a jugum, a small lobe that joins the fore- and hindwings during flight. In females, the configuration of the genitalia is exoporian, typified by an external groove along which spermatophores are transferred after mating, from the copulatory opening (the ostium bursae), to the ovipore for fertilisation.
