= Abantiades aphenges =

Scientific classification
- Kingdom: Animalia
- Phylum: Arthropoda
- Clade: Pancrustacea
- Class: Insecta
- Order: Lepidoptera
- Family: Hepialidae
- Genus: Abantiades
- Species: A. aphenges

Binomial name
- Abantiades aphenges (Turner, 1904)

Synonyms
- Pielus aphenges Turner, 1904

Species of moth

Abantiades aphenges is a moth of the family Hepialidae, first described in 1904 by Alfred Jefferis Turner as Pielus aphenges. The specific epithet, aphenges, means "dark, gloomy". It is endemic to Australia, including New South Wales and Queensland.
