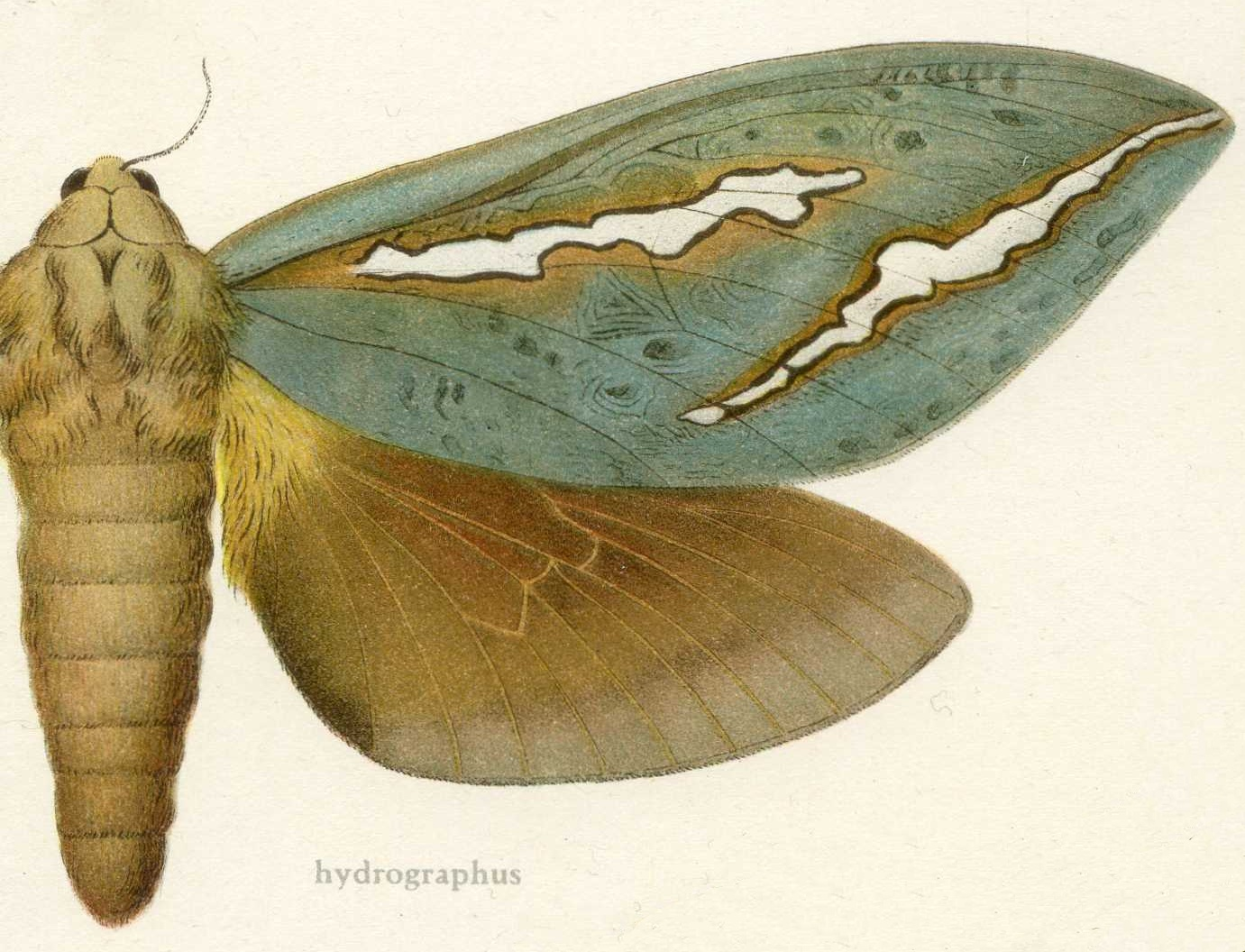

Scientific classification
- Kingdom: Animalia
- Phylum: Arthropoda
- Clade: Pancrustacea
- Class: Insecta
- Order: Lepidoptera
- Family: Hepialidae
- Genus: Abantiades
- Species: A. hydrographus

Binomial name
- Abantiades hydrographus (Felder & Rogenhofer, 1874)

Synonyms
- Pielus hydrographus Felder & Rogenhofer, 1874

= Abantiades hydrographus =

Species of moth

Abantiades hydrographus is a moth of the family Hepialidae. It is endemic to Western Australia.
