= Abantiades barnardi =

Scientific classification
- Domain: Eukaryota
- Kingdom: Animalia
- Phylum: Arthropoda
- Class: Insecta
- Order: Lepidoptera
- Family: Hepialidae
- Genus: Abantiades
- Species: A. barnardi

Binomial name
- Abantiades barnardi (Tindale, 1941)

Synonyms
- Bordaia barnardi; Trictena barnardi

Species of moth

Abantiades barnardi is a species of moth of the family Hepialidae. It was described by Norman Tindale in 1941, and is endemic to Western Australia.
