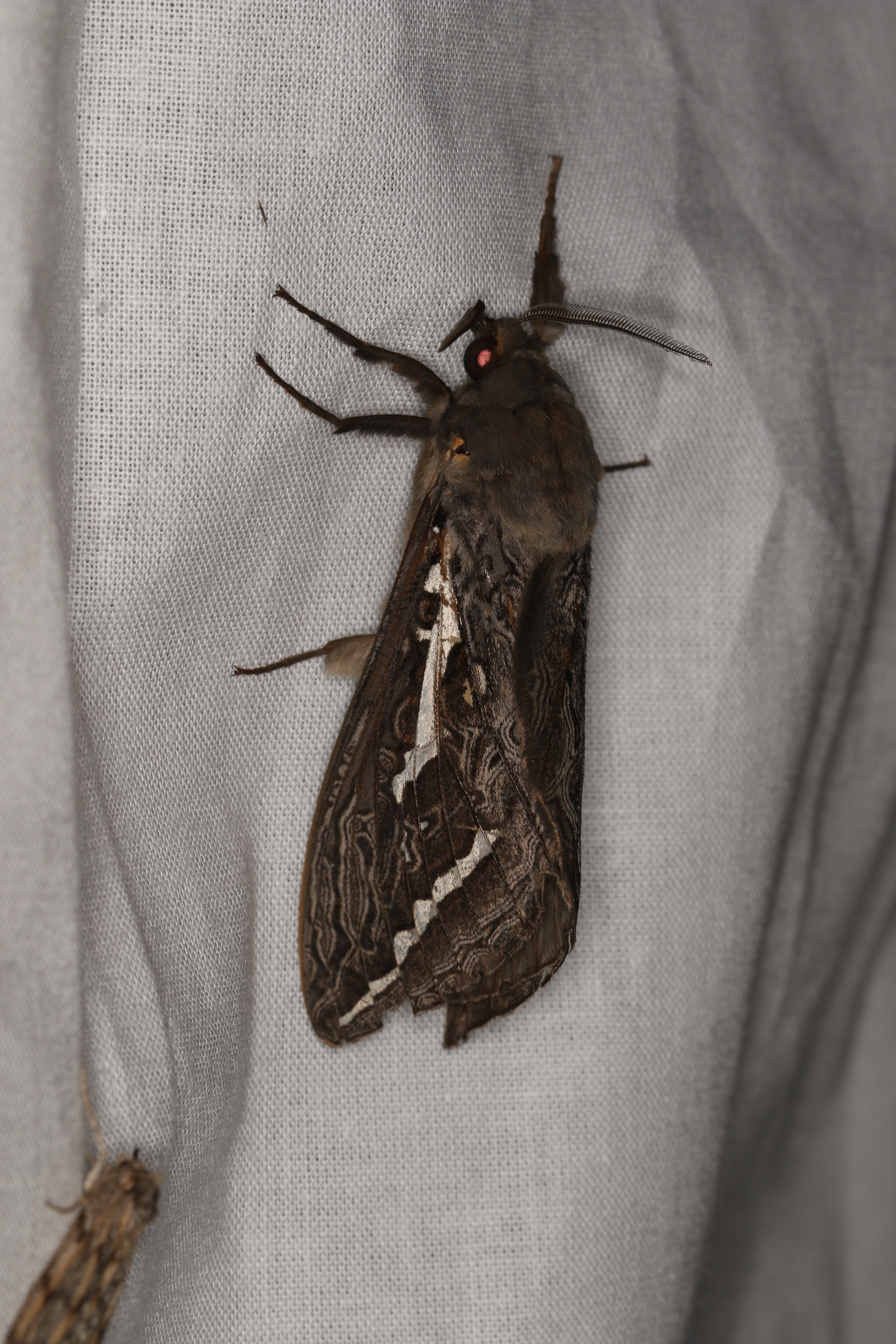

Scientific classification
- Kingdom: Animalia
- Phylum: Arthropoda
- Clade: Pancrustacea
- Class: Insecta
- Order: Lepidoptera
- Family: Hepialidae
- Genus: Abantiades
- Species: A. leucochiton

Binomial name
- Abantiades leucochiton (Pfitzner, 1914)

Synonyms
- Pielus leucochiton Pfitzner, 1914

= Abantiades leucochiton =

Species of moth

Abantiades leucochiton is a moth of the family Hepialidae. It is endemic to Australia, where it is found in New South Wales, South Australia and Victoria.

The larvae are subterranean and feed on the roots of Casuarina and Allocasuarina species.
