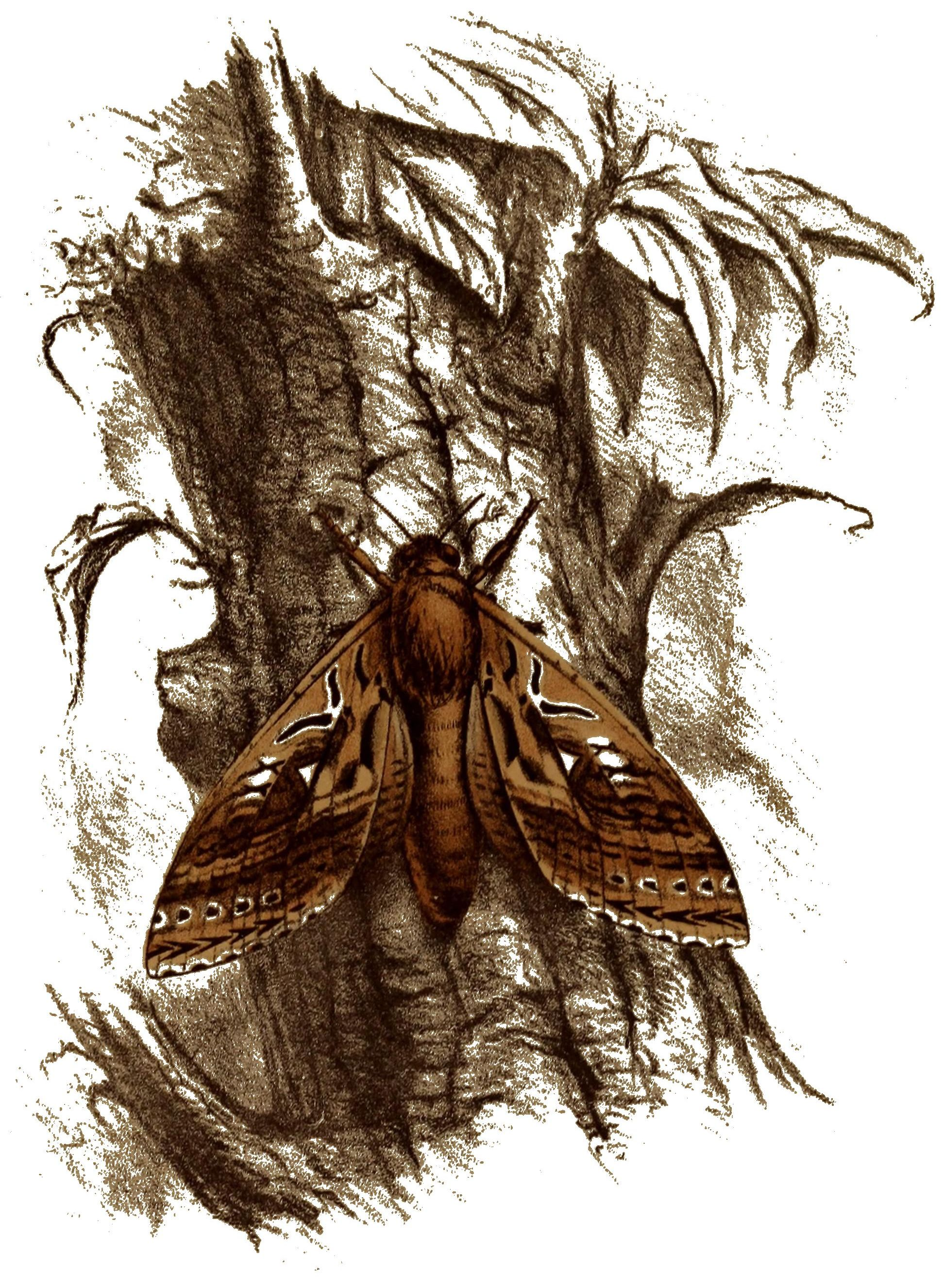

Scientific classification
- Kingdom: Animalia
- Phylum: Arthropoda
- Clade: Pancrustacea
- Class: Insecta
- Order: Lepidoptera
- Family: Hepialidae
- Genus: Aoraia
- Species: A. mairi

Binomial name
- Aoraia mairi Buller, 1872

Synonyms
- Porina mairi Buller, 1872

= Buller's moth =

Species of moth

Buller's moth (Aoraia mairi) is a possibly extinct moth that is endemic to New Zealand. It is known from a single specimen caught in the Ruahine Range by Sir Walter Buller while on an expedition searching for the huia in the summer of 1867. Buller named it Porina mairi in honour of his brother-in-law Captain Gilbert Mair. Buller described the species as having a wingspan of almost 6 inches (150 mm). It is this wingspan that rules out the specimen being associated with species such as Dumbletonius characterifer.

The specimen was sent to the British Museum on the Assaye in 1890. Although this ship was reported as sinking, this happened on its return journey from Britain. This implies that the specimen did make it to Britain. However the present location of the moth specimen is currently unknown.

In 1975 two caterpillars were collected in the Ōrongorongo River valley and appeared to be new to science. Scientists were unable to confirm whether they were the caterpillars of Buller's moth or were a new species of giant moth, despite attempts to raise the caterpillars to maturity. Subsequent study of these specimens indicated they belong to either D. characterifer or Aoraia enysii.

== Conservation status ==
In 2025 this species was classified by the New Zealand Department of Conservation as "data deficient" under the New Zealand Threat Classification System. This classification also considered the species taxonomically unresolved. This is as a result of the type specimen of the species being destroyed or lost and that the species has remained unrecognised since its description.
