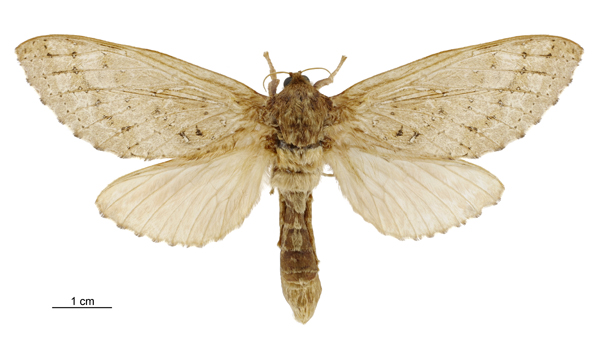
- Female
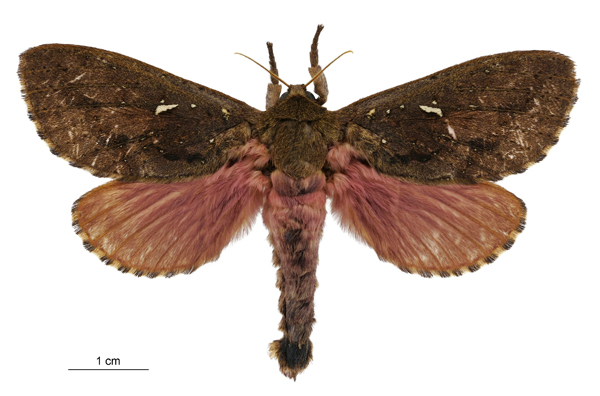
- Male

Scientific classification
- Kingdom: Animalia
- Phylum: Arthropoda
- Clade: Pancrustacea
- Class: Insecta
- Order: Lepidoptera
- Family: Hepialidae
- Genus: Dumbletonius
- Species: D. unimaculata

Binomial name
- Dumbletonius unimaculata (Salmon, 1948)

Synonyms
- Porina unimaculata Salmon, 1948; Trioxycanus unimaculatus (Salmon, 1948); Dumbletonius sylvicola Dugdale, 1988

= Dumbletonius unimaculatus =

Species of moth

Dumbletonius unimaculatus, also known as the forest ghost moth, is a species of moth of the family Hepialidae. It is endemic to New Zealand. This species is host to the vegetable caterpillar fungus Ophiocordyceps robertsii.

== Taxonomy ==
This species was first described in 1948 by John T. Salmon as Porina unimaculata from specimens collected by Graham Turbott on the Three Kings Islands. In 1966 Dumbleton moved the species to a new genus and gave the new combination as Trioxycanus unimaculatus, the species name being made masculine to agree with the new genus. John Dugdale created the genus Dumbletonius in 1986, and moved this species into it in 1994, synonymising Dumbletomius sylvicola with it in the process. The male holotype specimen is held at the Auckland War Memorial Museum.

== Description ==
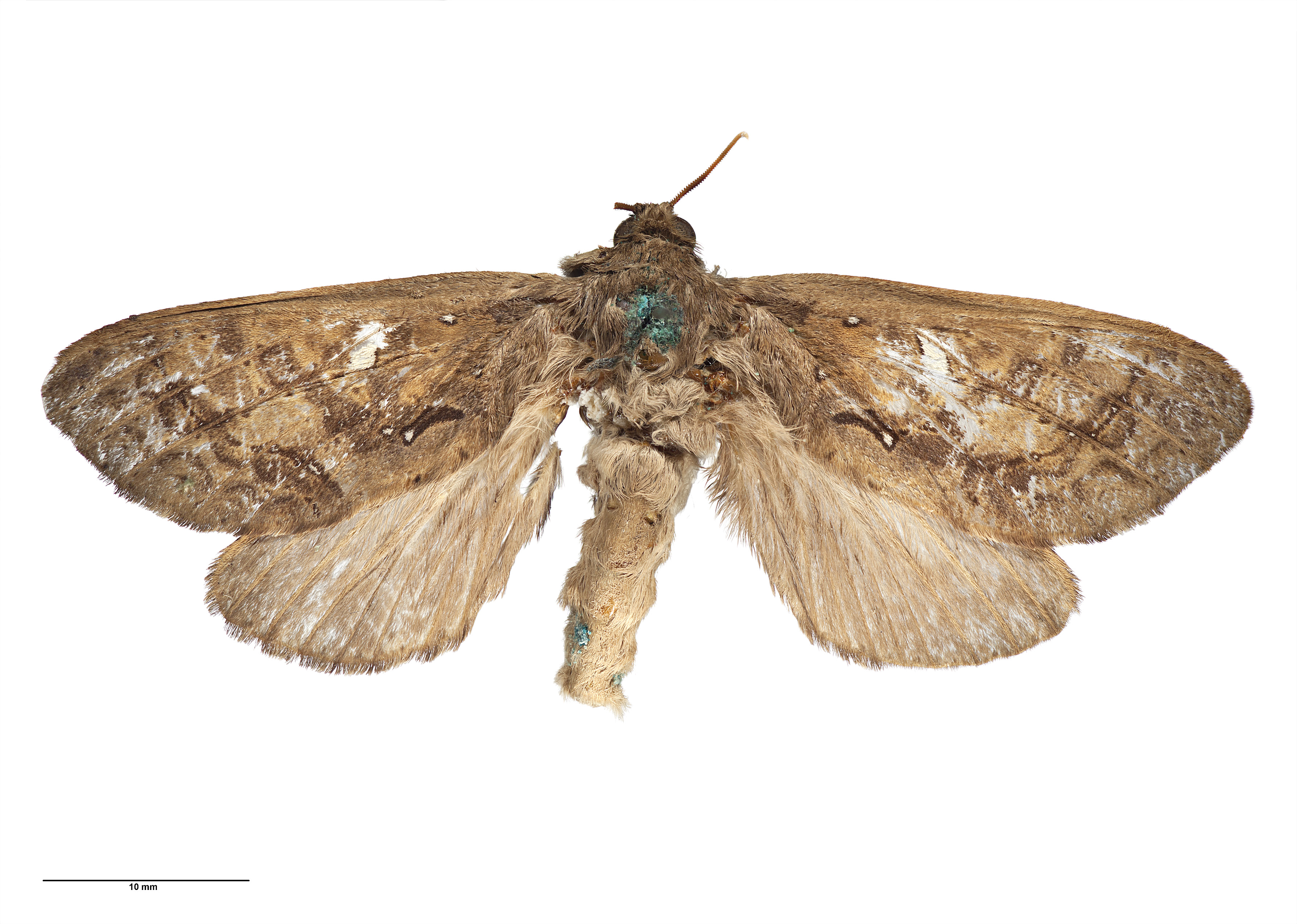
Male holotype specimen

The wingspan is 51–67 mm for males and 74–90 mm for females. The colour pattern of the forewings is complex in males and usually reduced or obsolete in female. The hindwings are unicolorous yellow, orange-yellow or pink. The bright colouration of the hindwing of the male of the species fades rapidly after death.

== Distribution ==
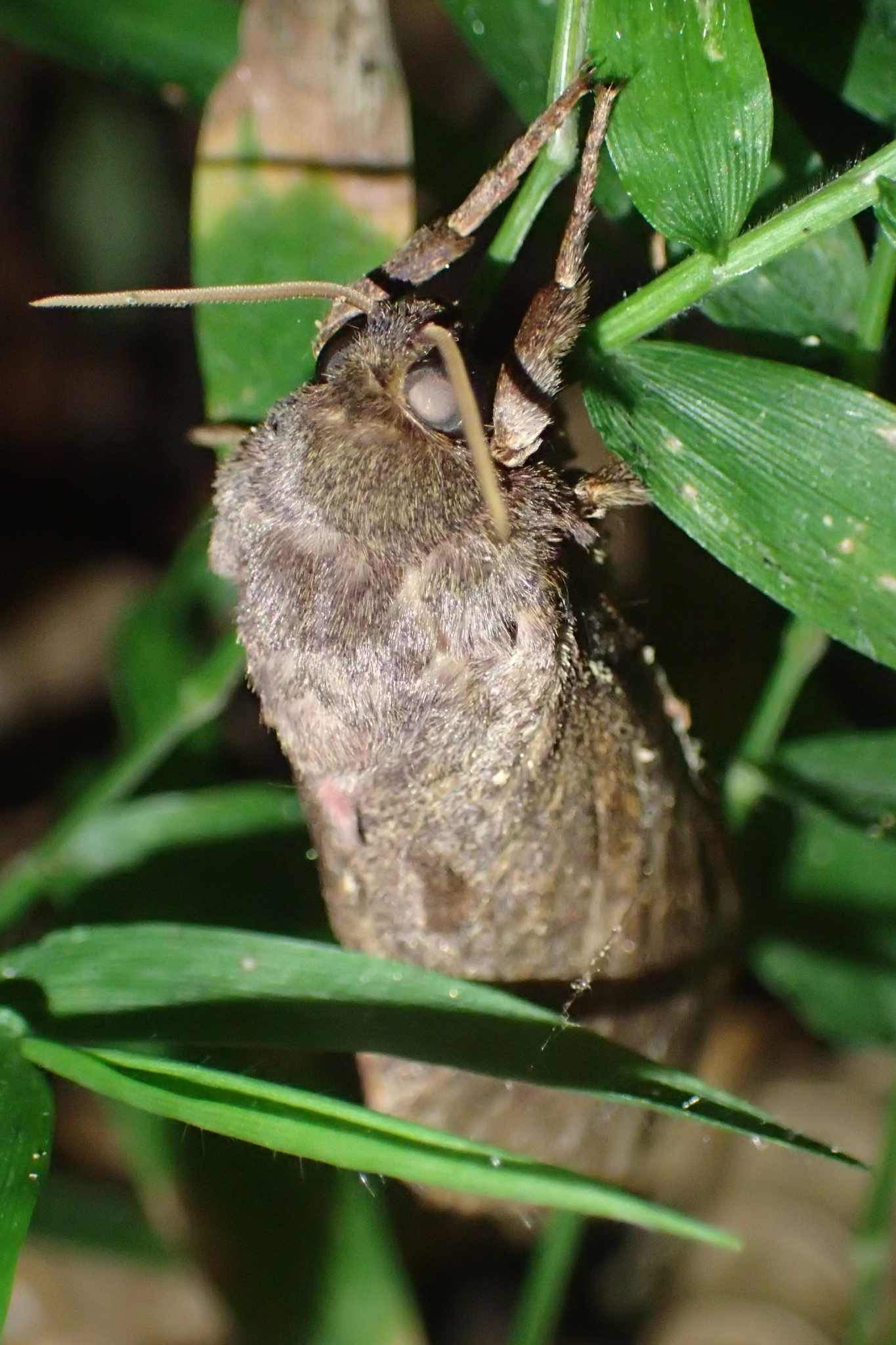
Close up of an adult from Hen Island, New Zealand

Dumbletonius unimaculatus is endemic to New Zealand and can be found only in the North Island where it is regarded as being common.

== Habitat ==
This species inhabits lowland native forest.

== Life cycle ==
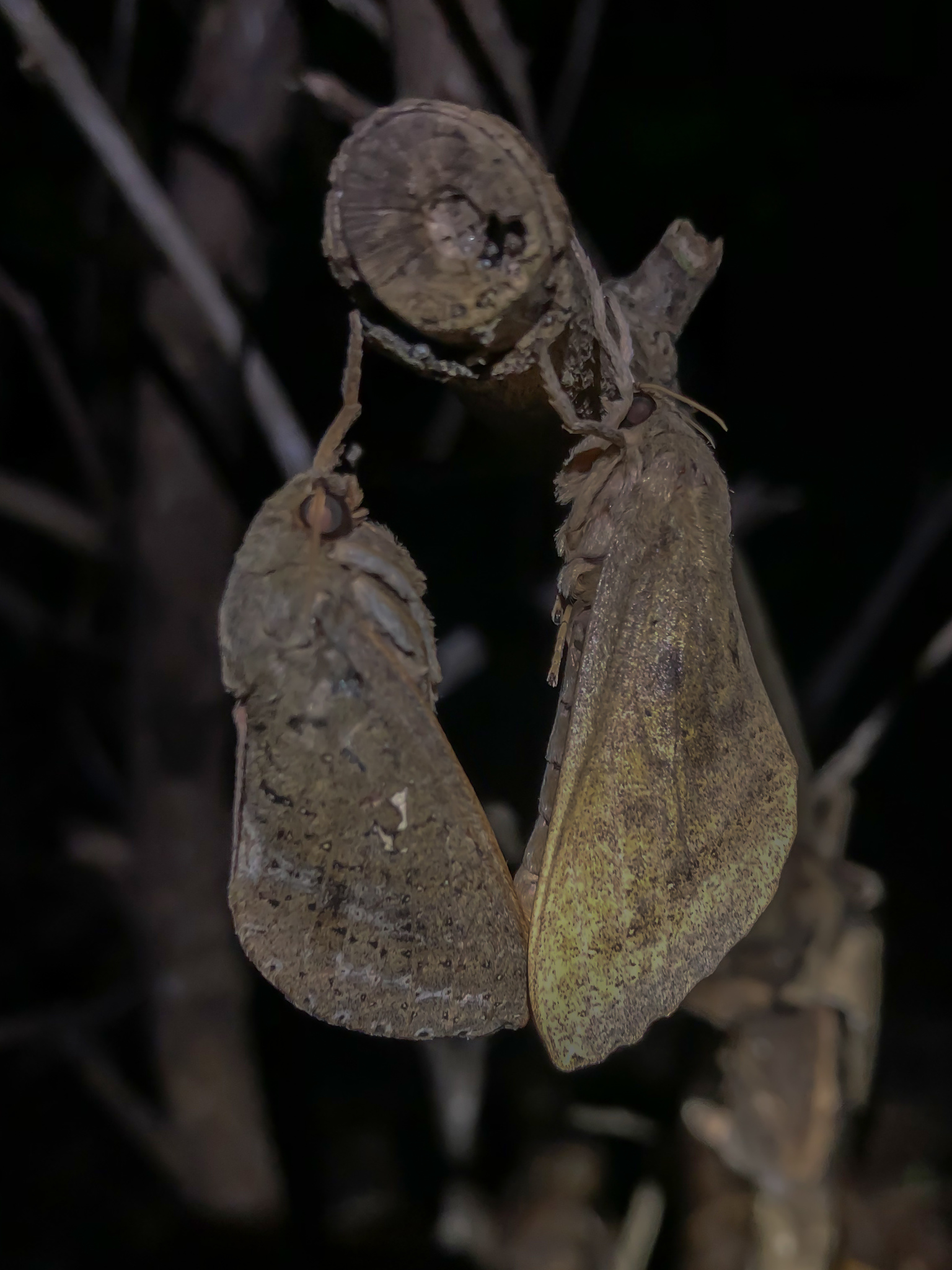
Male and female photographed together in the Poor Knights Islands, New Zealand

The female of the species can lay up to 10000 eggs amongst leaf litter in native forest. Larvae live two to three years in tunnels amongst the leaf litter and can grow to a length of 10 cm. The larva pupates in the tunnel it inhabits. The adult moth is on the wing from December to April.

== Hosts and threats ==
The larvae of this species probably feed on fallen leaves.

The larvae are a host for the vegetable caterpillar fungus Ophiocordyceps robertsii. This fungus mummifies the caterpillar then grows its fruiting body from the caterpillar's head through the soil.
