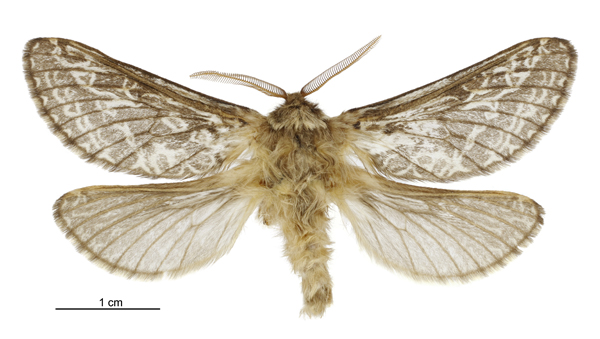

Conservation status
- Declining (NZ TCS)

Scientific classification
- Kingdom: Animalia
- Phylum: Arthropoda
- Clade: Pancrustacea
- Class: Insecta
- Order: Lepidoptera
- Family: Hepialidae
- Genus: Aoraia
- Species: A. aspina

Binomial name
- Aoraia aspina Dugdale, 1994

= Aoraia aspina =

Species of moth endemic to New Zealand

Aoraia aspina is a species of moth of the family Hepialidae. It was first described by John S. Dugdale in 1994. It is endemic to New Zealand and can be found in the Otago and Southland regions. This species frequents New Zealand snow grass habitat. Males are on the wing from February until April while females have been observed amongst plants in the genus Chionochloa. In 2025 this species was classified as having the conservation threat classification of "At Risk, Declining" by the Department of Conservation.

== Taxonomy ==
It was first described by John S. Dugdale in 1994 from specimens collected in the Otago and Southland regions. The male holotype, collected at Gem Lake in the Umbrella Mountains, Southland at an altitude of 1,300 metres (4,300 ft), is held in the New Zealand Arthropod Collection.

== Description ==
The wingspan is 46–53 mm for males, and are regarded as being moderately sized. The females are brachypterous, having wings that are much reduced in size in comparison to the males of the species. The hindwings of the female are longer than their forewings. Both the male and the female have forewings with markings that are coloured a whitish ash on a ground colour of rich, deep brown.

This species is similar in appearance to A . flavida, but can be distinguished as A. flavida has a pale streak on the forewing close to the rear of the insect, while A. aspina does not.

== Distribution ==
This species is endemic to New Zealand. It has only been observed in the Otago and Southland regions at altitudes of between 1,100 metres (3,600 ft) and 1,600 metres (5,200 ft).

== Habitat ==
A. aspina frequents New Zealand snow grass communities that are dominated by grass species in the genus Chionochloa.

== Behaviour ==
Adults are on wing from February to April. Males have been observed flying immediately following sunset just when it begins to get dark while females have been observed at that same time active amongst Chionochloa plants.

== Conservation status ==
In 2025 this species was classified by the New Zealand Department of Conservation as "at risk, declining" under the New Zealand Threat Classification System. This species obtained this classification as it is regarded as being biologically sparse, is range restricted, is threatened by climate change, and is in need of conservation research as there is a lack of data on both the population size as well as how the population of this species is changing over time.

== Gallery ==
Female

Male
