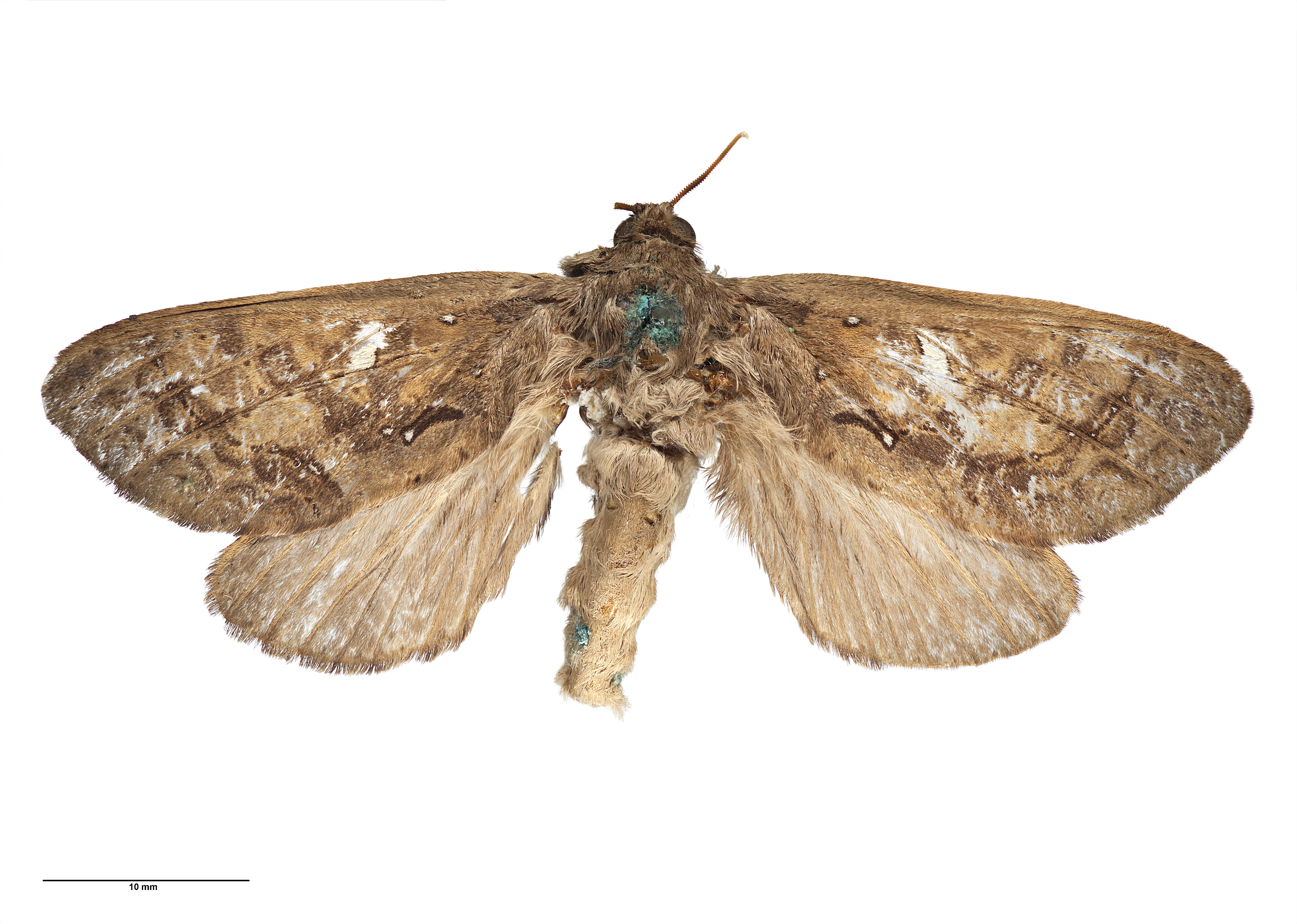

Scientific classification
- Kingdom: Animalia
- Phylum: Arthropoda
- Clade: Pancrustacea
- Class: Insecta
- Order: Lepidoptera
- Family: Hepialidae
- Genus: Dumbletonius; Dugdale, 1996

= Dumbletonius =

Genus of moths

Dumbletonius is a genus of moths of the family Hepialidae. There are two described species, both endemic to New Zealand.

The genus was named in honour of Lionel Jack Dumbleton.

== Species ==
- Dumbletonius characterifer
- Dumbletonius unimaculatus
