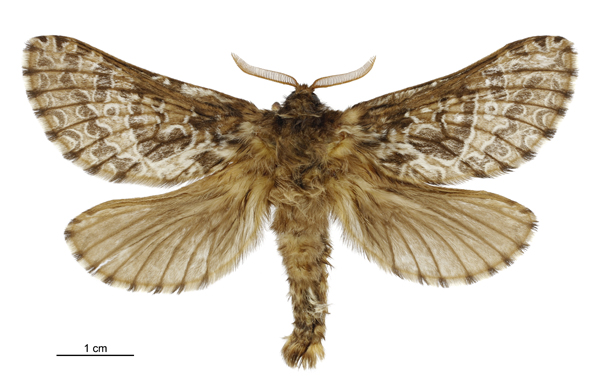

Scientific classification
- Kingdom: Animalia
- Phylum: Arthropoda
- Class: Insecta
- Order: Lepidoptera
- Family: Hepialidae
- Genus: Aoraia
- Species: A. dinodes

Binomial name
- Aoraia dinodes (Meyrick, 1890)

Synonyms
- Porina dinodes Meyrick, 1890

= Aoraia dinodes =

Species of moth

Aoraia dinodes is a species of moth of the family Hepialidae. It is endemic to New Zealand. This moth was described by Edward Meyrick in 1890 from specimens collected in Invercargill by Captain Hutton.

The wingspan is 62–70 mm for males and about 70 mm for females. Adults are on wing from February to June.
