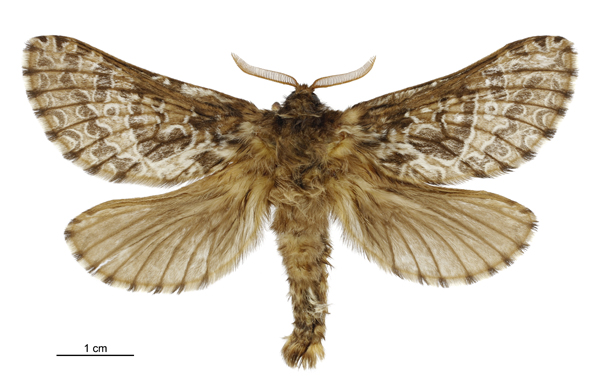
- Aoraia dinodes male

Scientific classification
- Kingdom: Animalia
- Phylum: Arthropoda
- Clade: Pancrustacea
- Class: Insecta
- Order: Lepidoptera
- Family: Hepialidae
- Genus: Aoraia; Dumbleton, 1966

Species
- See text.

Synonyms
- Trioxycanus Dumbleton, 1966

= Aoraia =

Genus of moths

Aoraia is a genus of moths of the family Hepialidae. There are 13 described species, all endemic to New Zealand. The type species of this genus is Porina dinodes Meyrick, 1890. This genus contains some large species with a wingspan of up to 150 mm (5.9 in).

== Species ==
- Aoraia aspina
- Aoraia aurimaculata
- Aoraia dinodes
- Aoraia ensyii
- Aoraia flavida
- Aoraia hespera
- Aoraia insularis – confined to Stewart Island / Rakiura & the small islands off Stewart Island / Rakiura.
- Aoraia lenis
- Aoraia macropis
- Aoraia oreobolae
- Aoraia orientalis
- Aoraia rufivena
- Aoraia senex

== Buller's moth ==
Buller's moth (Aoraia mairi) is possibly extinct and the description of this moth remains in doubt as the only recorded specimen, taken in 1867, has been lost.
