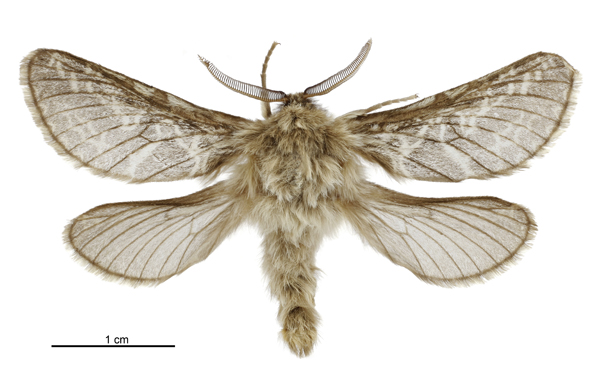
- Male

Scientific classification
- Kingdom: Animalia
- Phylum: Arthropoda
- Class: Insecta
- Order: Lepidoptera
- Family: Hepialidae
- Genus: Aoraia
- Species: A. macropis

Binomial name
- Aoraia macropis Dugdale, 1994

Synonyms

= Aoraia macropis =

Species of moth

Aoraia macropis is a species of moth of the family Hepialidae. It is endemic to New Zealand and is found in the mountains of southern Central Otago. It was described by John S. Dugdale in 1994.

== Description ==
The wingspan is 38–45 mm for males. Adult males are on wing from February to April. The females of the species are flightless and are diurnal.

== Behaviour ==
The adults of this species breed in Central Otago.
