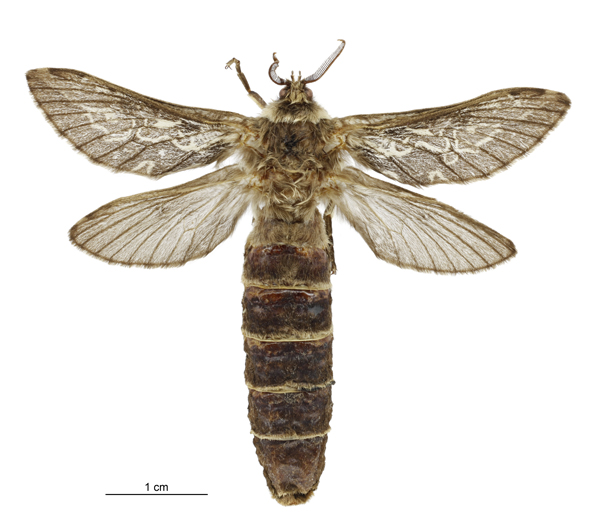
- Female specimen
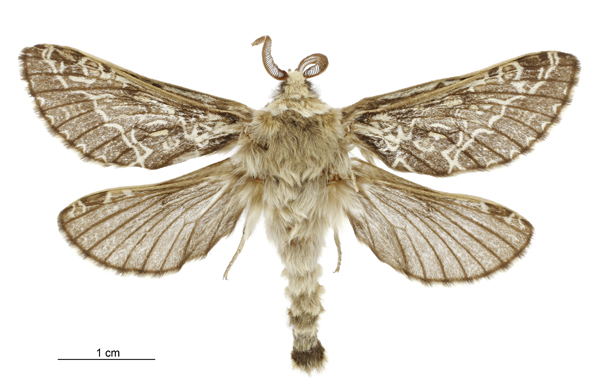
- Male specimen

Scientific classification
- Kingdom: Animalia
- Phylum: Arthropoda
- Class: Insecta
- Order: Lepidoptera
- Family: Hepialidae
- Genus: Aoraia
- Species: A. orientalis

Binomial name
- Aoraia orientalis Dugdale, 1994

= Aoraia orientalis =

Species of moth

Aoraia orientalis is a species of moth of the family Hepialidae. It is endemic to New Zealand and is found in eastern Central Otago. It was described by John S. Dugdale in 1994.
