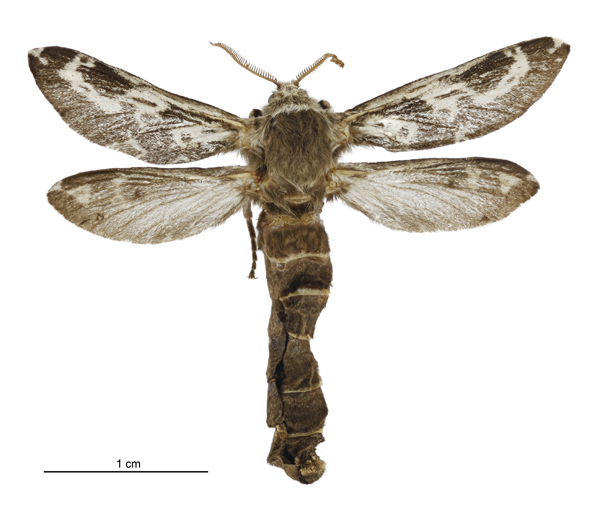
- Female specimen
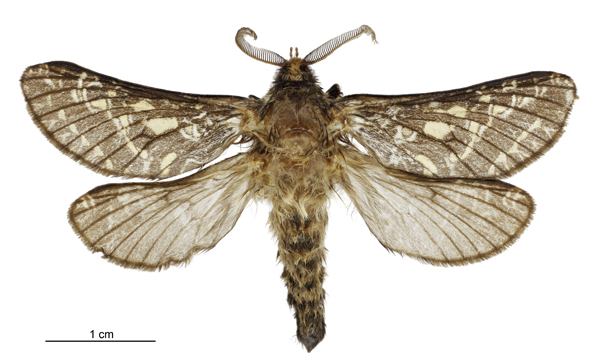
- Male specimen

Scientific classification
- Kingdom: Animalia
- Phylum: Arthropoda
- Clade: Pancrustacea
- Class: Insecta
- Order: Lepidoptera
- Family: Hepialidae
- Genus: Aoraia
- Species: A. senex

Binomial name
- Aoraia senex (Hudson, 1908)

Synonyms
- Porina senex Hudson, 1908; Porina annulata Hamilton, 1909

= Aoraia senex =

Species of moth

Aoraia senex is a species of moth of the family Hepialidae. It is endemic to New Zealand, where it is known from the South Island. This species was first described by George Vernon Hudson in 1908 from specimens discovered by J. H. Lewis in Central Otago.

The wingspan is 43–50 mm for males. Females are sub-brachypterous with a wingspan of 30–34 mm. The forewings and hindwings are sparsely scaled and those of the female are narrowed and apically pointed. Adults are on wing from December to February. Adults are day-flying.
