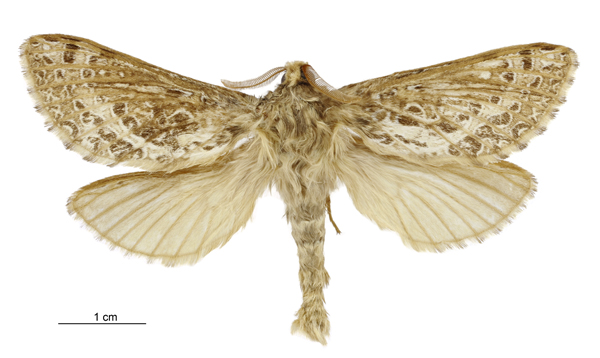
- Male specimen

Scientific classification
- Kingdom: Animalia
- Phylum: Arthropoda
- Class: Insecta
- Order: Lepidoptera
- Family: Hepialidae
- Genus: Aoraia
- Species: A. insularis

Binomial name
- Aoraia insularis Dugdale, 1994

= Aoraia insularis =

Species of moth

Aoraia insularis, also known as the Rakiura ghost moth, is a species of moth of the family Hepialidae. It is endemic to New Zealand and is found on only on Stewart Island and Steward Island's surrounding smaller islands. It was described by John S. Dugdale in 1994.

The wingspan is 54–65 mm for males. Adults are on wing from January to March.

Larvae have been collected from shafts associated with tussocks on Poa foliosa.
