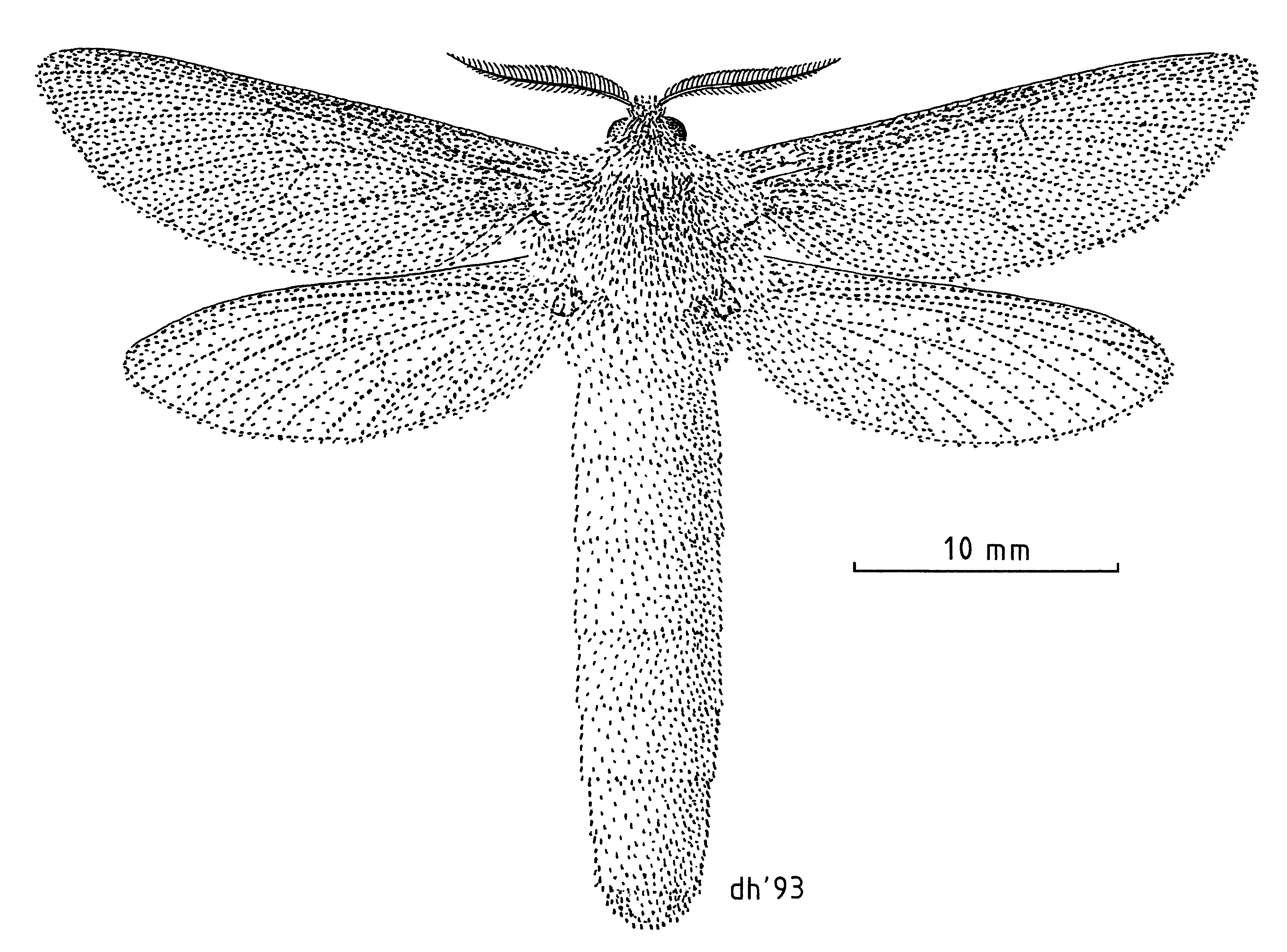
- Female

Scientific classification
- Kingdom: Animalia
- Phylum: Arthropoda
- Class: Insecta
- Order: Lepidoptera
- Family: Hepialidae
- Genus: Aoraia
- Species: A. oreobolae

Binomial name
- Aoraia oreobolae Dugdale, 1994

= Aoraia oreobolae =

Species of moth

Aoraia oreobolae is a species of moth in the family Hepialidae. This species is endemic to New Zealand. It is classified as "At Risk, Naturally Uncommon" by the Department of Conservation.

== Taxonomy ==
This species was first described by John S. Dugdale in 1994. The holotype specimen was collected in the Tapanui Blue Mountains in Southland by N. Hudson on 8 March 1987. The holotype specimen is held at the New Zealand Arthropod Collection.

== Description ==
The wingspan is 52–56 mm for males and 39–55 mm for females. It can be distinguished from other Aoraia species as the male has long antennae and the female is fully winged and the scales on those wings are thin and scattered.

== Distribution ==
This species is endemic to New Zealand. They are only found in Southland.

== Biology and behaviour ==
Adults are on wing in March.

== Host species and habitat ==
The larvae feed on Oreobolus pectinatus and are associated with cushion bogs in the Blue Mountains containing this species of plant as well as Gaimardea setacea and Dracophyllum muscoides.

== Conservation status ==
This species has been classified as having the "At Risk, Naturally Uncommon" conservation status under the New Zealand Threat Classification System.
