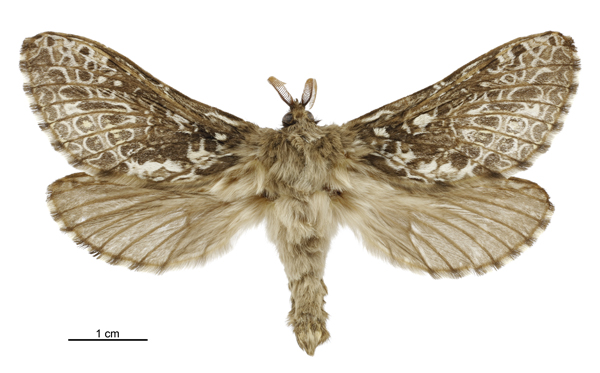

Scientific classification
- Kingdom: Animalia
- Phylum: Arthropoda
- Class: Insecta
- Order: Lepidoptera
- Family: Hepialidae
- Genus: Aoraia
- Species: A. aurimaculata

Binomial name
- Aoraia aurimaculata (Philpott, 1914)

Synonyms
- Porina aurimaculata Philpott, 1914

= Aoraia aurimaculata =

Species of moth

Aoraia aurimaculata is a species of moth of the family Hepialidae. It was described by Alfred Philpott in 1914 from a specimen collected at The Hermitage, Mount Cook by F. S. Oliver. This holotype specimen is now lost. A. aurimaculata is endemic to New Zealand,

The wingspan is 62–67 mm for males and 85–94 mm for females. Adults are on wing from February to May.
