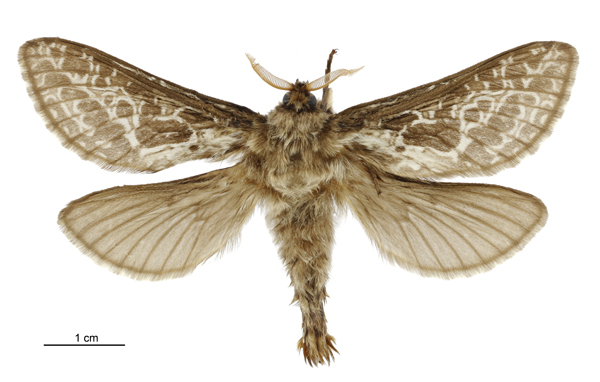
- Male specimen

Scientific classification
- Kingdom: Animalia
- Phylum: Arthropoda
- Class: Insecta
- Order: Lepidoptera
- Family: Hepialidae
- Genus: Aoraia
- Species: A. lenis

Binomial name
- Aoraia lenis Dugdale, 1994

= Aoraia lenis =

Species of moth

Aoraia lenis is a species of moth of the family Hepialidae. It is endemic to New Zealand. It was described by John S. Dugdale in 1994.

The wingspan is 62–73 mm for males. Female are brachypterous. Adults are on wing from February to May.
