= Aoraia hespera =

- Holotype

Conservation status
- Data Deficit (NZ TCS)

Scientific classification
- Kingdom: Animalia
- Phylum: Arthropoda
- Clade: Pancrustacea
- Class: Insecta
- Order: Lepidoptera
- Family: Hepialidae
- Genus: Aoraia
- Species: A. hespera

Binomial name
- Aoraia hespera Dugdale, 1994

Species of moth

Aoraia hespera is a species of moth of the family Hepialidae. This species was first described by John S. Dugdale in 1994. It is endemic to New Zealand.

== Conservation status ==
In 2025 this species was classified by the New Zealand Department of Conservation as "data deficient" under the New Zealand Threat Classification System.
