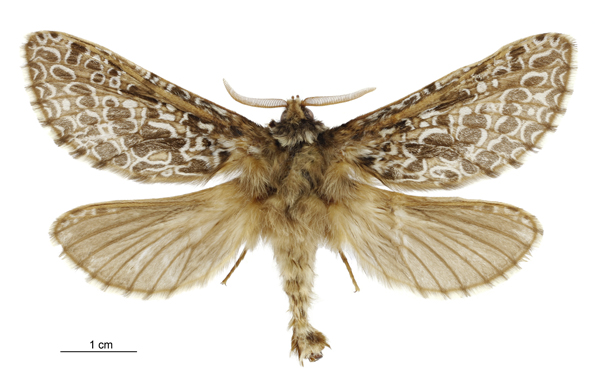

Scientific classification
- Kingdom: Animalia
- Phylum: Arthropoda
- Class: Insecta
- Order: Lepidoptera
- Family: Hepialidae
- Genus: Aoraia
- Species: A. rufivena

Binomial name
- Aoraia rufivena Dugdale, 1994

= Aoraia rufivena =

Species of moth

Aoraia rufivena, also known as the rufous-veined aoraia or the Otago ghost moth, is a species of moth of the family Hepialidae. It is endemic to New Zealand. A. rufivena was described by John S. Dugdale in 1994.

== Taxonomy ==
This species was first described by John S. Dugdale in 1994 using specimens collected in Otago. The male holotype, collected at Swampy Summit in Dunedin by Brian Patrick in April, is held at the New Zealand Arthropod Collection.

== Description ==
The wingspan is 60–74 millimetres (2.4–2.9 in) for males. The forewing ground colour is pale and dark brown, with an ash-white pattern. Females are sub-brachypterous with a wingspan of 55–68 millimetres (2.2–2.7 in). The males can be distinguished from similar looking species as they usually have a vivid pattern on their forewings with a prominent rust brown coloured subcostal streak.

== Distribution ==
A. rufivena is endemic to New Zealand. This species has been observed in the Mackenzie District, Otago, as well as in Southland.

== Habitat and hosts ==
This species inhabits subalpine grasslands, mires and native forest as well as cool temperate native forest in and around the city of Dunedin.

== Behaviour ==
Adults are nocturnal and are on wing from January to April.
