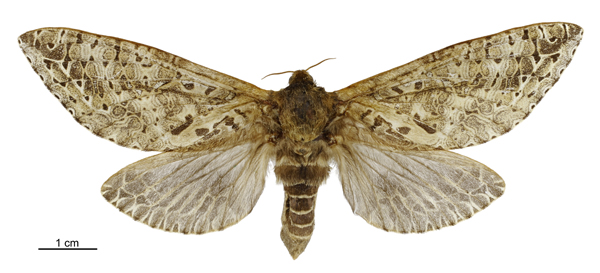
- Female specimen
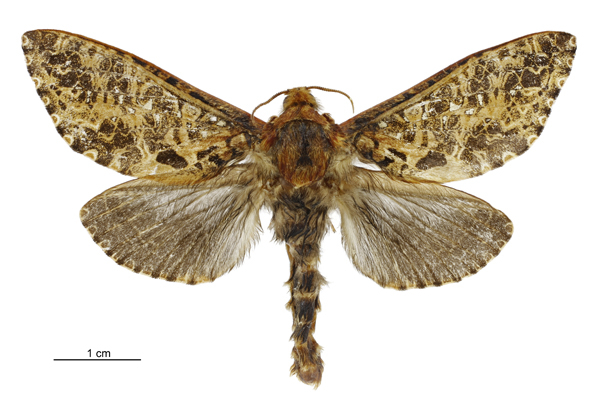
- Male specimen

Scientific classification
- Kingdom: Animalia
- Phylum: Arthropoda
- Class: Insecta
- Order: Lepidoptera
- Family: Hepialidae
- Genus: Dumbletonius
- Species: D. characterifer

Binomial name
- Dumbletonius characterifer (Walker, 1865)

Synonyms
- Hepialus characterifer Walker, 1865; Oxycanus impletus Walker, 1865; Porina mairi Buller, 1873

= Dumbletonius characterifer =

Species of moth

Dumbletonius characterifer is a species of moth of the family Hepialidae. It is endemic to New Zealand. It was first described by Francis Walker in 1865.

The wingspan is 56–70 mm (2.2–2.8 in) for males and 72–95 mm (2.8–3.7 in) for females. There is a complex ocellate pattern with bicoloured scales on the forewings. The hindwings are dark brown. Adults are on wing from November to April. D. characterifer is present in the Waikato, Taupo, Taranaki, Wairarapa, Wellington, Nelson, Marlborough and Marlborough Sounds, Buller and Westland regions.

The larvae feed on leaf litter. They built tunnels in the leaf litter from which they feed.

The northern most location this species has been observed at is Mount Te Aroha. This species has been known to be infected by Ophiocordyceps robertsii, the vegetable caterpillar fungus.
