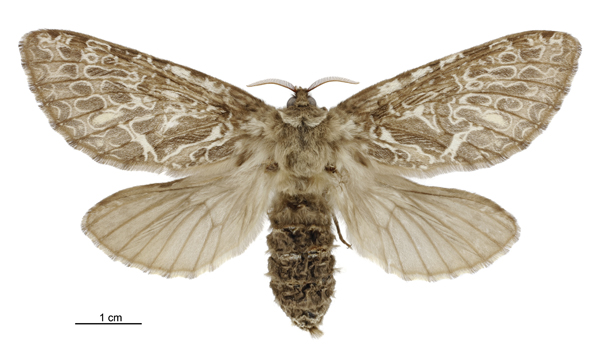
- Female specimen
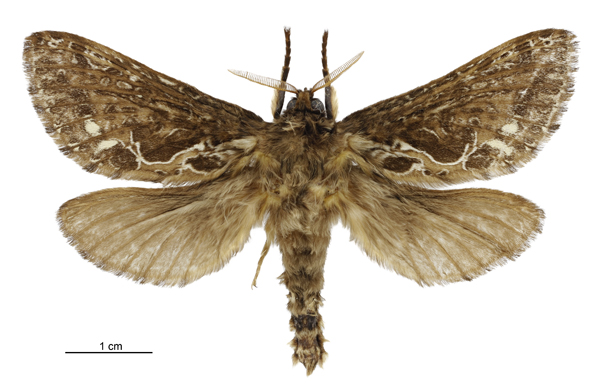
- Male specimen

Scientific classification
- Kingdom: Animalia
- Phylum: Arthropoda
- Clade: Pancrustacea
- Class: Insecta
- Order: Lepidoptera
- Family: Hepialidae
- Genus: Aoraia
- Species: A. enysii

Binomial name
- Aoraia enysii (Butler, 1877)

Synonyms
- Porina enysii Butler, 1877; Oxycanus enysii; Porina leonina Philpott, 1927

= Aoraia enysii =

Species of moth

Aoraia enysii, also known as the forest ghost moth, is a species of moth of the family Hepialidae. It is endemic to New Zealand. This is the only species of the genus Aoraia that can be found in the North as well as the South Island. This species can be found from Mount Te Aroha southwards. This species was described by Arthur Gardiner Butler in 1877 from a specimen obtained in the North Island by J. D. Enys.

The wingspan is 60–74 mm for males and 78–110 mm for females. Adults are on wing from February to May.

The larvae feed on leaf litter.
