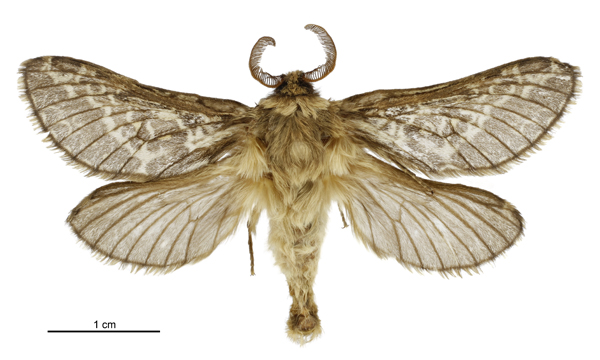
- Male specimen

Conservation status
- Data Deficit (NZ TCS)

Scientific classification
- Kingdom: Animalia
- Phylum: Arthropoda
- Clade: Pancrustacea
- Class: Insecta
- Order: Lepidoptera
- Family: Hepialidae
- Genus: Aoraia
- Species: A. flavida

Binomial name
- Aoraia flavida Dugdale, 1994

= Aoraia flavida =

Species of moth

Aoraia flavida is a species of moth from the family Hepialidae. It is endemic to New Zealand. This species was described by John S. Dugdale in 1994 from specimens obtained near Gem Lake in the Umbrella Mountains in Southland and collected by B. H. Patrick.

== Physical description ==
The wingspan is 47–50 mm for males. Females are brachypterous. Adults can be found from March to April.

== Conservation status ==
In 2025 this species was classified by the New Zealand Department of Conservation as "data deficient" under the New Zealand Threat Classification System.
