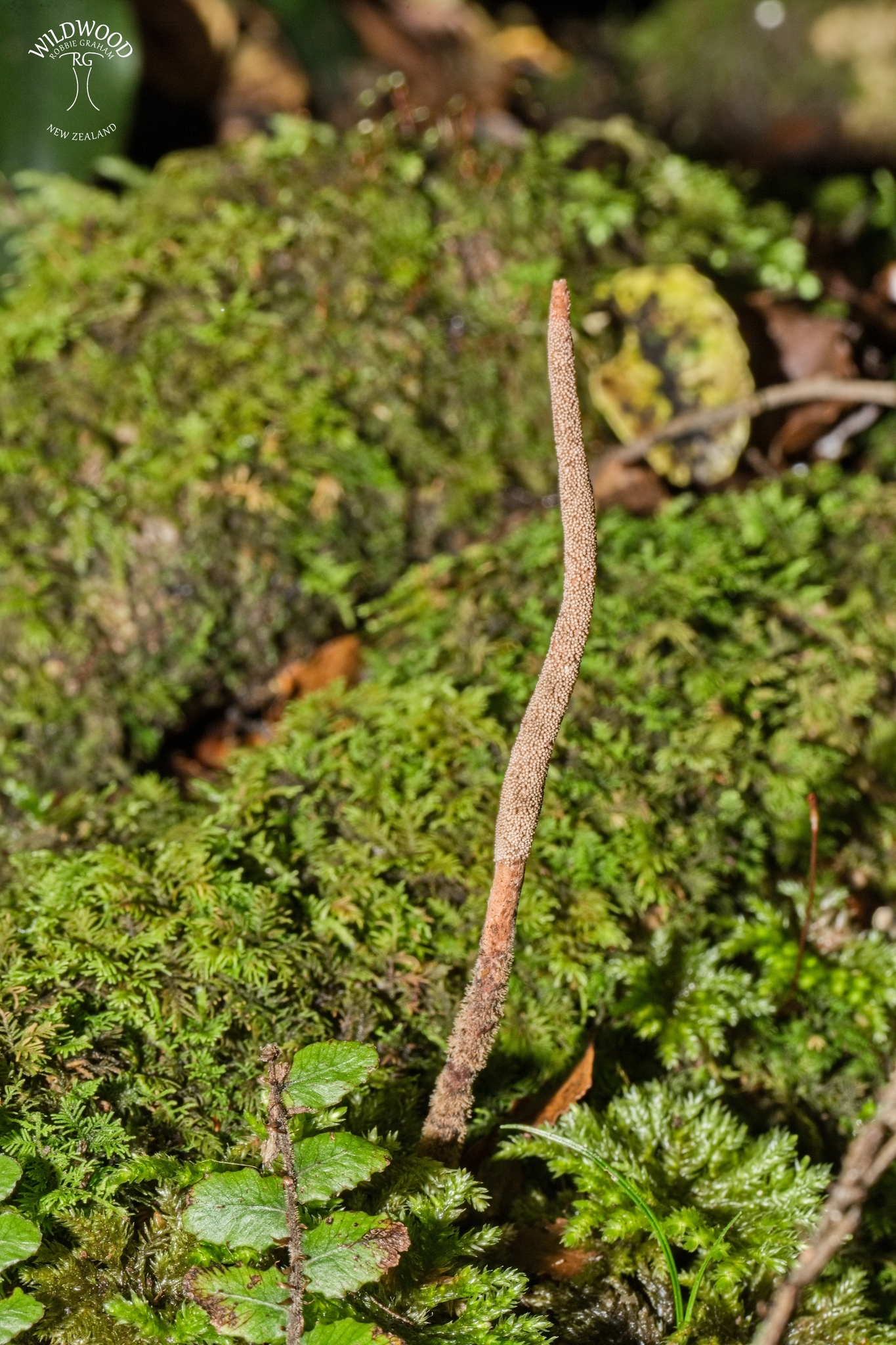

Scientific classification
- Kingdom: Fungi
- Division: Ascomycota
- Class: Sordariomycetes
- Order: Hypocreales
- Family: Ophiocordycipitaceae
- Genus: Ophiocordyceps
- Species: O. robertsii

Binomial name
- Ophiocordyceps robertsii (Hook.) G.H. Sung, J.M. Sung, Hywel-Jones & Spatafora (2007)

Synonyms
- Cordyceps robertsii (Hook.) Berk. 1855; Spaeronaema huegeli Corda 1840 Sphaeria robertsii Hook. 1837

= Ophiocordyceps robertsii =

Species of fungus

Ophiocordyceps robertsii, known in New Zealand as vegetable caterpillar (Māori: āwhato or āwheto) is an entomopathogenic fungus belonging to the order Hypocreales (Ascomycota) in the family Ophiocordycipitaceae. It invades the caterpillars of leaf-litter dwelling moths and turns them into fungal mummies, sending up a fruiting spike above the forest floor to shed its spores. Caterpillars eat the spores as they feed on leaf litter, completing the fungal life cycle. Evidence of this fungus can be seen when small brown stems push through the forest floor: underneath are the dried remains of the host caterpillar. This species was first thought by Europeans to be a worm or caterpillar that burrowed from the top of a tree to the roots, where it exited and then grew a shoot of the plant out of its head. It was the first fungus from New Zealand to be given a binomial name.

== Genomics ==
Ophiocordyceps robertsii has a genome that is relatively large for species in the Ophiocordycipitaceae family, estimated at between of 95-103 million base pairs. This size is comparable to that of the related species Ophiocordyceps sinensis. Analysis of the genome sequence revealed much of the size is due to DNA that is repetitive. The analysis also identified the mating-type locus, supporting a heterothallic lifecycle for the species, in which strains of the MAT1-1 and MAT1-2 types are required for mating.

== Uses ==
The parasitised caterpillar has been used by Māori as a food or to create an ink called ngārahu for traditional tā moko tattoos. The charred caterpillars were mixed with tree sap to make an almost black ink. Scientists suggest that the fungus produces antiseptic chemicals that can prevent infection. In the early 20th century, mummified caterpillars were sold to tourists as a curio.

== Gallery ==
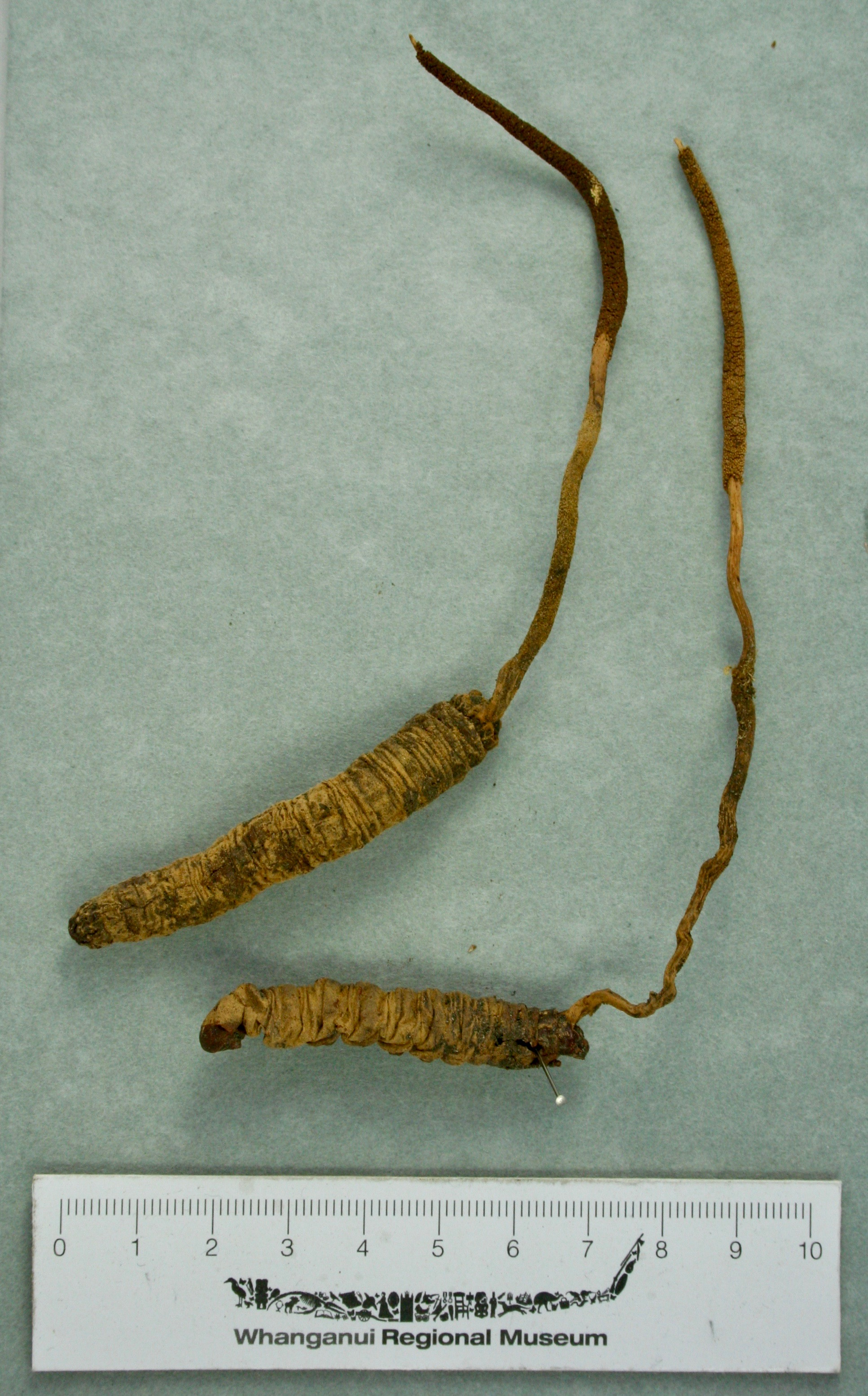
Ophiocordyceps robertsii in the collection of the Whanganui Regional Museum

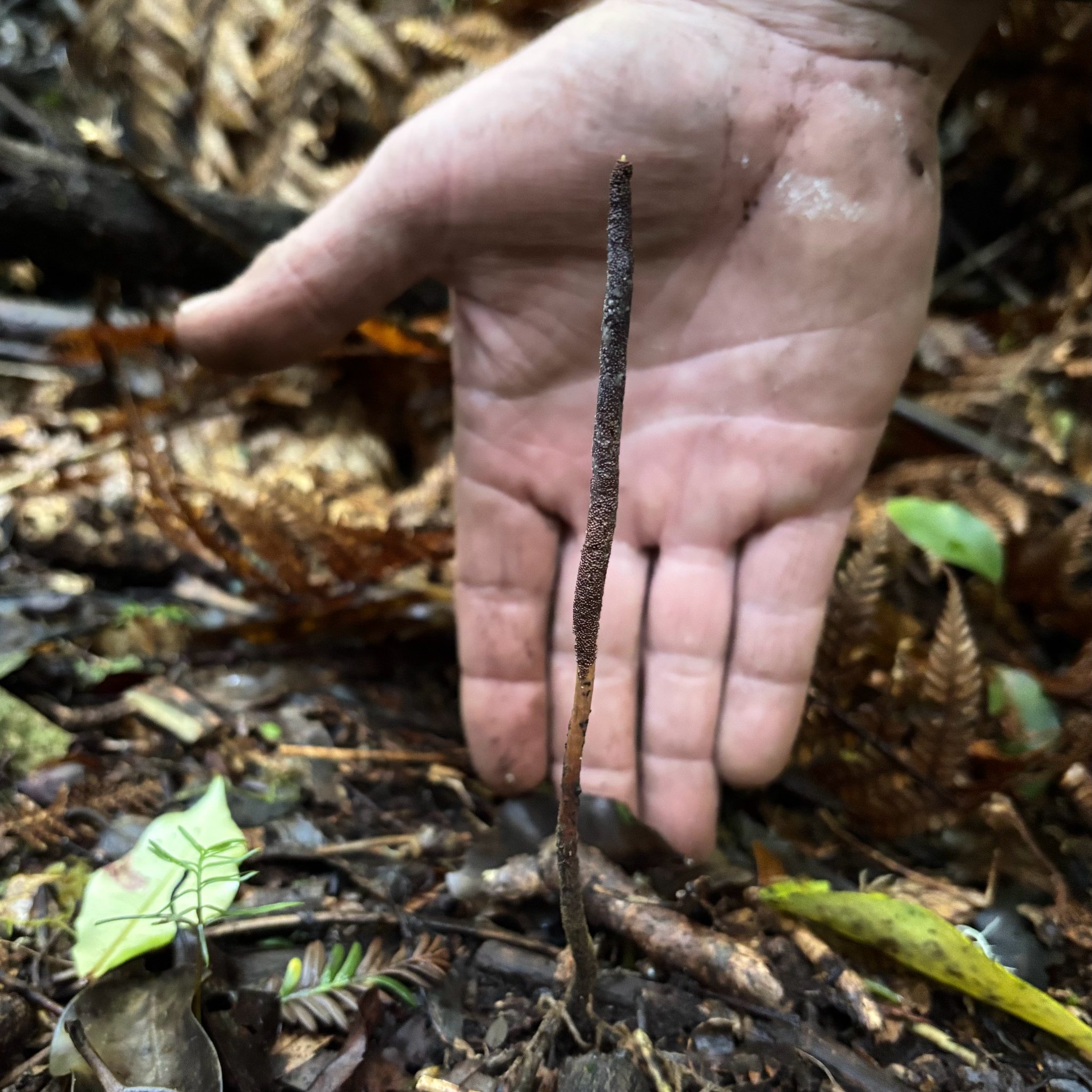
Growing in undergrowth (hand for scale)

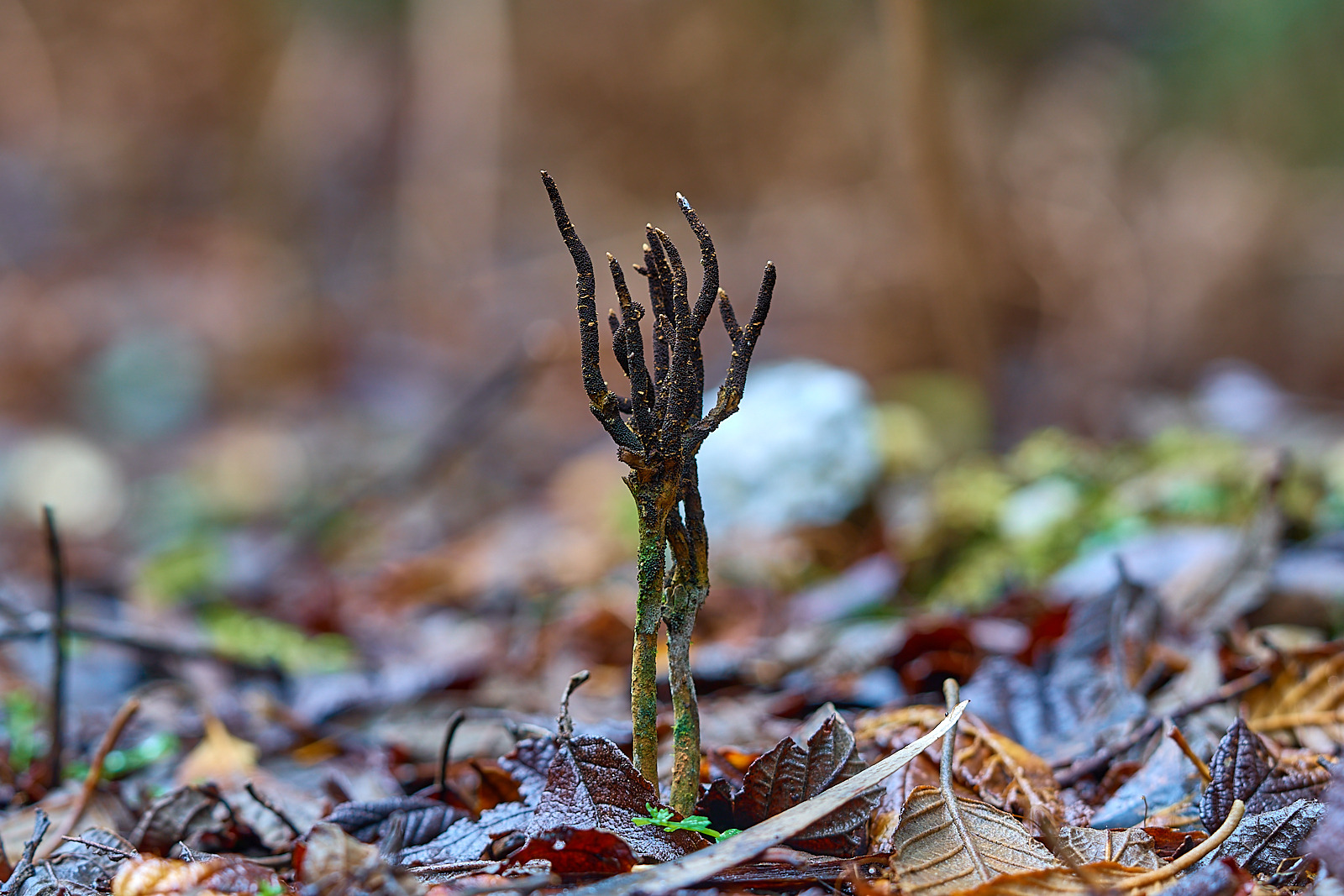
Branched form

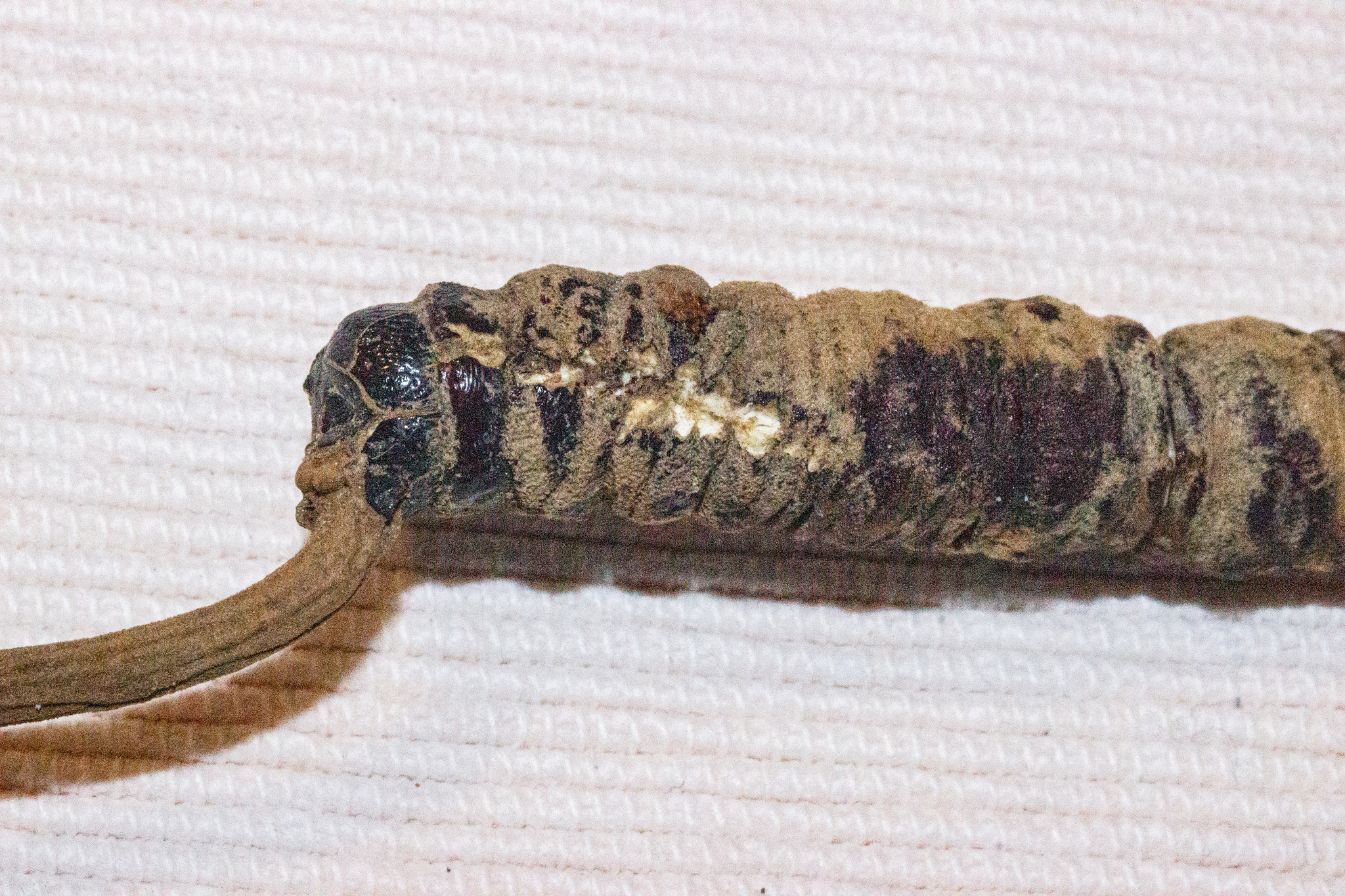
Close-up of caterpillar
