= H. dentata =

H. dentata may refer to:

- Habenaria dentata, a species of orchid
- Habrosyne dentata, a species of moth in the family Drepanidae
- Harpagomorpha dentata, a species of millipede in the family Paradoxosomatidae
- Hapalogaster dentata, a species of hapalogastrid king crab
- Hemaris dentata, the Anatolian bee hawkmoth, a species of moth in the family Sphingidae
- Hibbertia dentata, an ornamental plant species
- Hoplocorypha dentata, a praying mantis species
- Hydropionea dentata, a species of moth in the family Crambidae from Guatemala

== See also ==
- Dentata (disambiguation)
