= C. dentata =

C. dentata may refer to:

- Castanea dentata, the American chestnut, a species in the beech & oak family found in North America
- Christella dentata, a small fern species found in Australia and on islands in the south Pacific Ocean
- Coelolepis dentata, a prehistoric jawless fish species
- Curetis dentata, a butterfly species
- Cyclemys dentata, the Asian leaf turtle, a turtle species

== See also ==
- Dentata (disambiguation)
