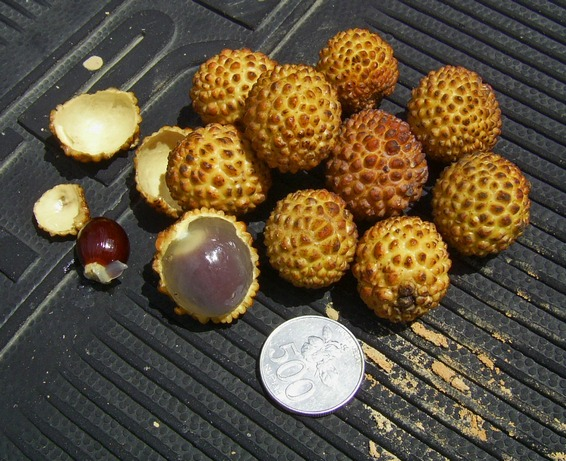
- Alupag fruits with 500 Rp coin for scale

Scientific classification
- Kingdom: Plantae
- Clade: Embryophytes
- Clade: Tracheophytes
- Clade: Angiosperms
- Clade: Eudicots
- Clade: Rosids
- Order: Sapindales
- Family: Sapindaceae
- Genus: Dimocarpus
- Species: D. malesianus

Binomial name
- Dimocarpus malesianus (Leenh.) Lithanatudom & Chaowasku 2017

Synonyms
- Dimocarpus longan subsp. malesianus Leenh

= Alupag =

Type of fruit

The alupag is a fruit of the Dimocarpus malesianus tree found in Indochina including Malaysia. Compared to a longan, it has bumpier skin similar to the lychee. The tree's wood is used to make combs.

== See also ==
- Lychee
- Longan
