= M. dentatus =

M. dentatus may refer to:

- Melicytus dentatus, the tree violet, a shrub species native to south-east Australia
- Mimulus dentatus , the coastal monkeyflower, a flowering plant species native to the western coast of North America

== See also ==
- Dentatus (disambiguation)
