= Hydropionea =

Scientific classification
- Kingdom: Animalia
- Phylum: Arthropoda
- Clade: Pancrustacea
- Class: Insecta
- Order: Lepidoptera
- Family: Crambidae
- Subfamily: Glaphyriinae
- Genus: Hydropionea; Hampson, 1917

Genus of moths

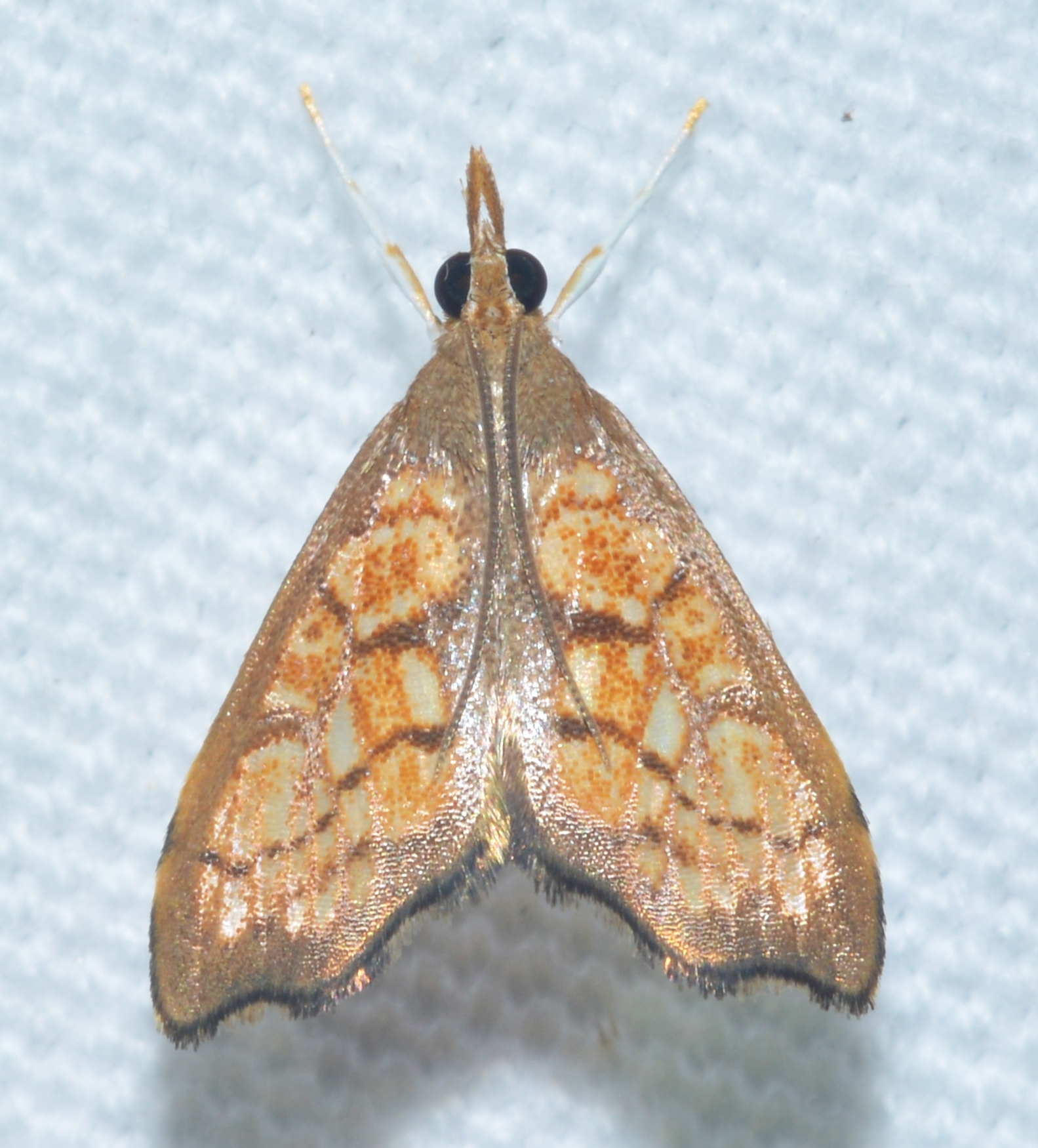
Hydropionea fenestralis, Costa Rica

Hydropionea is a genus of moths of the family Crambidae. The 13 described species are distributed in Central and South America.

The genus was formerly treated in Spilomelinae, but it is now placed in Glaphyriinae.

The larvae are found to feed on Capparis uniflora (Capparaceae), which fits with the general feeding habit of the subfamily Glaphyriinae of feeding on Brassicales.

== Species ==
- Hydropionea barnesalis (Dyar, 1923)
- Hydropionea brevicans (Dyar, 1923)
- Hydropionea dentata (Druce, 1895)
- Hydropionea fenestralis (Barnes & McDunnough, 1914)
- Hydropionea lavinia (Schaus, 1912)
- Hydropionea melliculalis Lederer, 1863
- Hydropionea oblectalis (Hulst, 1886)
- Hydropionea protopennis (Dyar, 1923)
- Hydropionea pseudopis (Dyar, 1914)
- Hydropionea rufalis (Hampson, 1917)
- Hydropionea rusina (Druce, 1895)
- Hydropionea schausalis (Dyar, 1923)
- Hydropionea sufflexalis (Dyar, 1914)
