= R. dentata =

R. dentata may refer to:

- Rhus dentata, the nana berry, a plant species found in South Africa
- Roridula dentata, a protocarnivorous plant species native to South Africa

== See also ==
- Dentata (disambiguation)
