= Dimocarpus gardneri =

Scientific classification
- Kingdom: Plantae
- Clade: Tracheophytes
- Clade: Angiosperms
- Clade: Eudicots
- Clade: Rosids
- Order: Sapindales
- Family: Sapindaceae
- Genus: Dimocarpus
- Species: D. gardneri

Binomial name
- Dimocarpus gardneri (Thwaites) Leenh.

Species of flowering plant

Dimocarpus gardneri is a species of plant related to the longan found in Sri Lanka. It is endangered in the wild due to habitat loss.

Dimocarpus gardneri is a middle-sized tree. It grows in dry parts of Sri Lanka.
