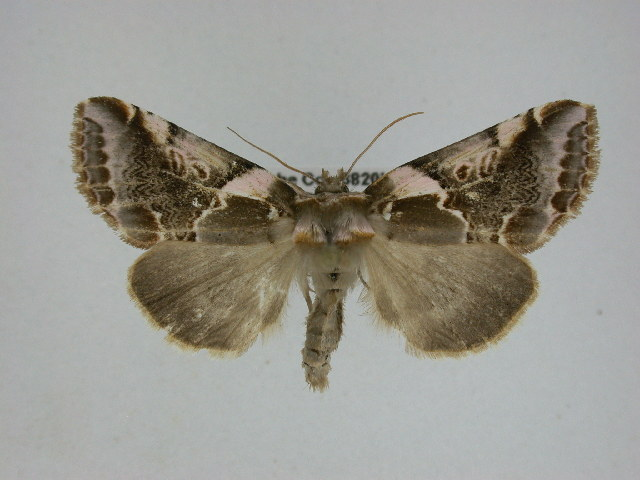

Scientific classification
- Kingdom: Animalia
- Phylum: Arthropoda
- Class: Insecta
- Order: Lepidoptera
- Family: Drepanidae
- Genus: Habrosyne
- Species: H. gloriosa

Binomial name
- Habrosyne gloriosa (Guenée, 1852)

Synonyms
- Thyatira gloriosa Guenée, 1852; Habrosyne rectangulata Ottolengui, 1897; Habrosyne gloriosa arizonensis Barnes & McDunnough, 1912

= Habrosyne gloriosa =

Glorious habrosyne moth

Species of false owlet moth

Habrosyne gloriosa, the glorious habrosyne moth, is a moth in the family Drepanidae.

== Location ==
It is found in North America, where it has been recorded from the northern United States, south in the Rocky Mountains to Arizona. In Canada, it is found in Ontario and Quebec.

== Characteristics ==
The wingspan is about 37 mm. Adults are very similar to Habrosyne scripta, but the antemedian line has a sharp angle near the middle. Adults are on wing from April to September in two generations per year.

The larvae's host plants are unknown but presumably Rubus and Physocarpus species.
