= Dimocarpus australianus =

Scientific classification
- Kingdom: Plantae
- Clade: Tracheophytes
- Clade: Angiosperms
- Clade: Eudicots
- Clade: Rosids
- Order: Sapindales
- Family: Sapindaceae
- Genus: Dimocarpus
- Species: D. australianus

Binomial name
- Dimocarpus australianus Leenh.

Species of flowering plant

Dimocarpus australianus also known as Australian native lychee, is a species of trees, closely related to the longan, constituting part of the plant family Sapindaceae. They are endemic to Cape York Peninsula, Australia. The edible fruit tastes like lychee, sweeter than longan, and occasionally gets described as 'too sweet' in comparison by longan fanciers.
