= T. dentatus =

T. dentatus may refer to:

- Tarsius dentatus, the Dian's tarsier or Diana tarsier, a nocturnal primate species endemic to central Sulawesi, Indonesia
- Tridentarius dentatus, the toothed conch, a sea snail species found in the Red Sea and the Indian Ocean

== See also ==
- Dentatus (disambiguation)
