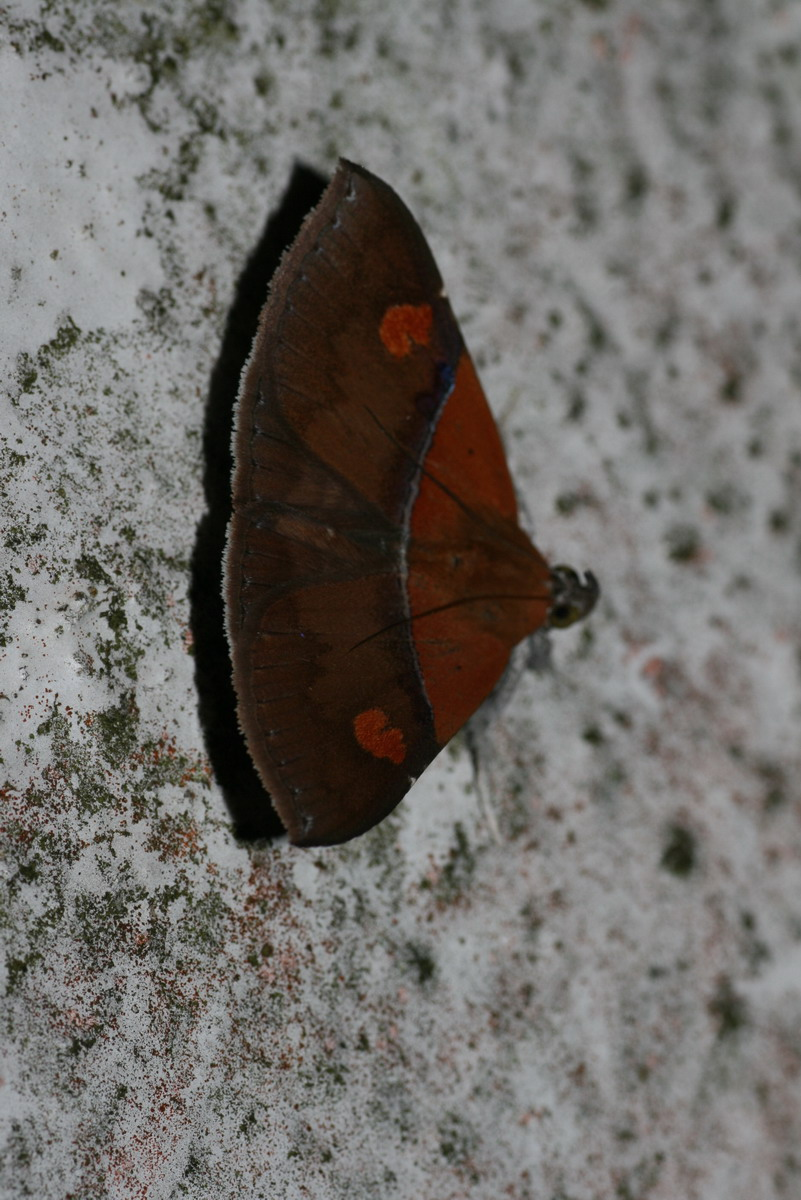

Scientific classification
- Kingdom: Animalia
- Phylum: Arthropoda
- Class: Insecta
- Order: Lepidoptera
- Superfamily: Noctuoidea
- Family: Erebidae
- Genus: Sympis
- Species: S. rufibasis

Binomial name
- Sympis rufibasis Guenée, 1852

= Sympis rufibasis =

Species of moth

Sympis rufibasis is a moth of the family Noctuidae first described by Achille Guenée in 1852. It is found from the Indo-Australian tropics of India, Sri Lanka, Borneo east to New Guinea, the Solomons and Queensland.

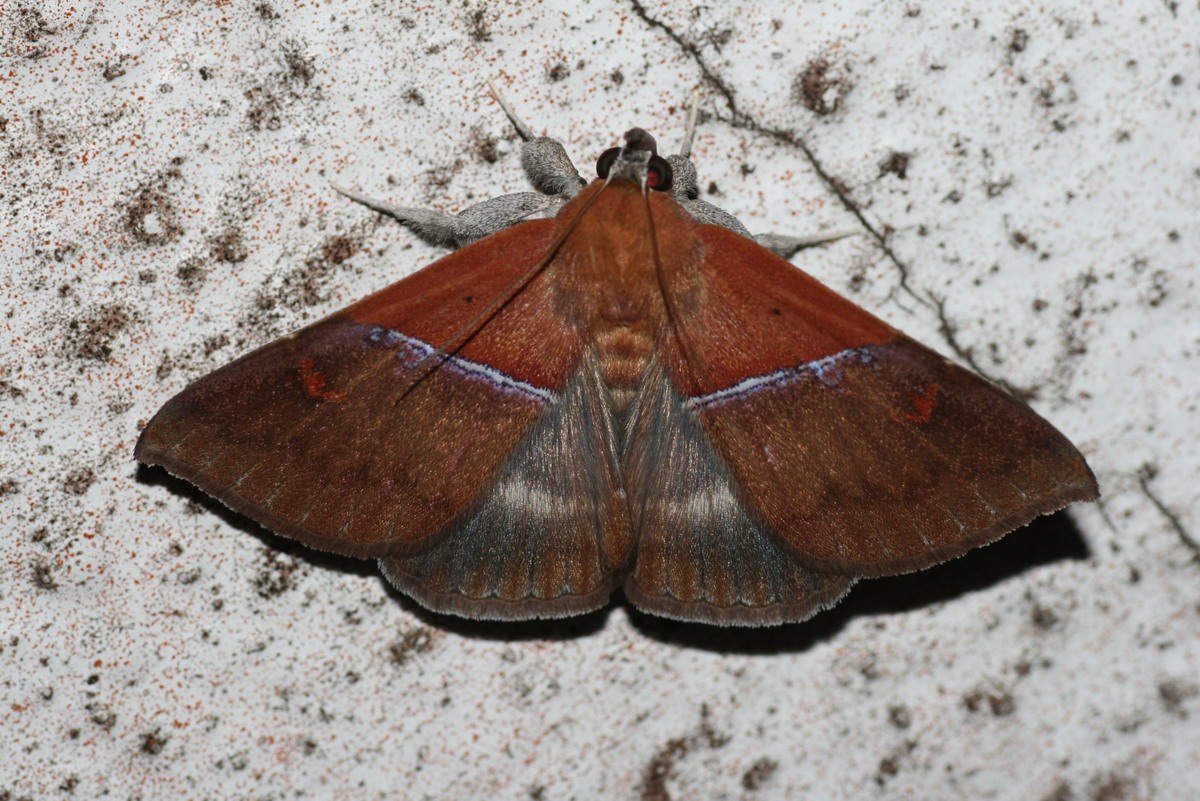

== Description ==
Its wingspan is 48 to 50 mm. The male has an orange-red head and thorax. Abdomen reddish brown. Forewings with orange-red basal area, bounded by an oblique blue line. The outer area reddish brown with a large scarlet lunule beyond the cell and a white speck on the costa above it. An indistinct, irregularly dentate, sub-marginal line and a marginal specks series present. Hindwings fuscous with incomplete medial white band and waved marginal line. Ventral side almost entirely grey suffused. A crenulate postmedial line present. Female lack scarlet lunule on forewings.

Larva darkish, olive green brown with a distinct pale yellow stripe which runs along each side and extends from the head to the anal prolegs. The larvae feed on Dimocarpus, Litchi and Nephelium species.
