= Harpagomorpha =

Harpagomorpha is the scientific name of two genera of organisms and may refer to:

- Harpagomorpha (millipede) Jeekel, 1980, a genus of millipedes in the family Paradoxosomatidae
- Harpagomorpha (moth) Walker, 1864, a genus of insects in the family Pyralidae
