= Dimocarpus yunnanensis =

Scientific classification
- Kingdom: Plantae
- Clade: Tracheophytes
- Clade: Angiosperms
- Clade: Eudicots
- Clade: Rosids
- Order: Sapindales
- Family: Sapindaceae
- Genus: Dimocarpus
- Species: D. yunnanensis

Binomial name
- Dimocarpus yunnanensis (W.T.Wang) C.Y.Wu & T.L.Ming

Species of flowering plant

Dimocarpus yunnanensis is a species of tree native to China related to the longan. They are usually 10 feet (3.0 m) tall when fully grown. The drupes are small and inedible. They are sometimes grown in gardens as ornamental plants.
