= Habrosyne sanguinea =

Scientific classification
- Domain: Eukaryota
- Kingdom: Animalia
- Phylum: Arthropoda
- Class: Insecta
- Order: Lepidoptera
- Family: Drepanidae
- Genus: Habrosyne
- Species: H. sanguinea

Binomial name
- Habrosyne sanguinea Moore, 1882

Species of false owlet moth

Habrosyne sanguinea is a moth in the family Drepanidae first described by Frederic Moore in 1882. It is found in Sikkim in India, Tibet in China and Nepal.

The wingspan is about 44 mm. The forewings have a bright ferruginous basal patch, bearing a silvery spot below the median nervure, and also creamy white on its outer edge. The outer half of the wing is dark ferruginous brown, with a bright ferruginous streak and patch on the inner margin, the latter with a waved white inner edge. There are two bright ferruginous patches on the costa with white inner edges. The hindwings are dark fuscous.
