= Habrosyne obscura =

Scientific classification
- Domain: Eukaryota
- Kingdom: Animalia
- Phylum: Arthropoda
- Class: Insecta
- Order: Lepidoptera
- Family: Drepanidae
- Genus: Habrosyne
- Species: H. obscura

Binomial name
- Habrosyne obscura Roepke, 1944

Species of false owlet moth

Habrosyne obscura is a moth in the family Drepanidae. It is found in Indonesia (Java).
