= Hydropionea pseudopis =

Scientific classification
- Domain: Eukaryota
- Kingdom: Animalia
- Phylum: Arthropoda
- Class: Insecta
- Order: Lepidoptera
- Family: Crambidae
- Genus: Hydropionea
- Species: H. pseudopis

Binomial name
- Hydropionea pseudopis (Dyar, 1914)

Synonyms
- Clupeosoma pseudopis Dyar, 1914

Species of moth

Hydropionea pseudopis is a moth in the family Crambidae. It was described by Harrison Gray Dyar Jr. in 1914. It is found in Mexico.
