= Habrosyne sumatrana =

Scientific classification
- Domain: Eukaryota
- Kingdom: Animalia
- Phylum: Arthropoda
- Class: Insecta
- Order: Lepidoptera
- Family: Drepanidae
- Genus: Habrosyne
- Species: H. sumatrana

Binomial name
- Habrosyne sumatrana Werny, 1966

Species of false owlet moth

Habrosyne sumatrana is a moth in the family Drepanidae. It is found in Indonesia (Sumatra).
