= Dimocarpus confinis =

Scientific classification
- Kingdom: Plantae
- Clade: Embryophytes
- Clade: Tracheophytes
- Clade: Spermatophytes
- Clade: Angiosperms
- Clade: Eudicots
- Clade: Rosids
- Order: Sapindales
- Family: Sapindaceae
- Genus: Dimocarpus
- Species: D. f. subsp. indochinensis

Binomial name
- Dimocarpus fumatus subsp. indochinensis Leenh

Synonyms
- Dimocarpus confinis (F.C.How & C.N.Ho) H.S.Lo; Pseudonephelium confine F.C.How & C.N.Ho

Species of flowering plant

Dimocarpus confinis is now considered a subspecies of the plant Dimocarpus fumatus (subsp. indochinensis). The species ranges from southern China (Guangdong, Guangxi, Guizhou, Hunan, Yunnan provinces) and Indo-China. It produces oval-shaped drupe fruit, but is mainly grown as an ornamental plant and not as a food source.
