= Habrosyne intermedia =

Scientific classification
- Domain: Eukaryota
- Kingdom: Animalia
- Phylum: Arthropoda
- Class: Insecta
- Order: Lepidoptera
- Family: Drepanidae
- Genus: Habrosyne
- Species: H. intermedia

Binomial name
- Habrosyne intermedia (Bremer, 1864)

Synonyms
- Thyatira intermedia Bremer, 1864; Habrosyne conscripta nepalensis Werny, 1966

Species of false owlet moth

Habrosyne intermedia is a moth in the family Drepanidae. It is found in the Russian Far East, the Korean Peninsula, Japan, India, Nepal and China.

The larvae feed on Rubus species.

== Subspecies ==
- Habrosyne intermedia intermedia (south-eastern Russia, Japan, Korean Peninsula, China: Heilongjiang)
- Habrosyne intermedia conscripta Warren, 1912 (India, Nepal, China: Hebei, Shaanxi, Ningxia, Gansu, Qinghai, Sichuan, Yunnan, Tibet)
