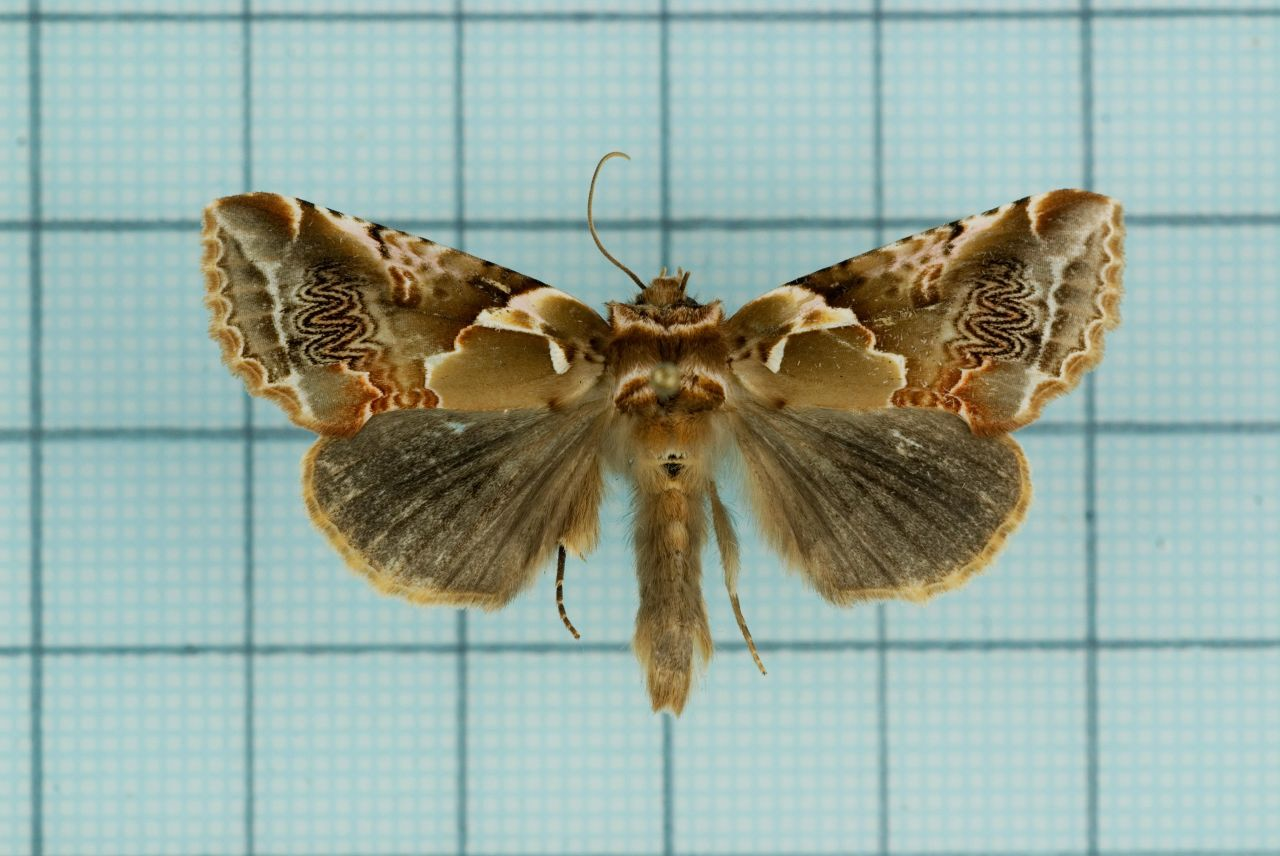

Scientific classification
- Kingdom: Animalia
- Phylum: Arthropoda
- Class: Insecta
- Order: Lepidoptera
- Family: Drepanidae
- Genus: Habrosyne
- Species: H. petrographa

Binomial name
- Habrosyne petrographa (Poujade, 1887)

Synonyms
- Habrosyne pterographa; Thyatira pterographa Poujade, 1887; Gonophora thibetana Houlbert, 1921; Habrosyne ptrographa tapaischana Werny 1966

= Habrosyne petrographa =

Species of false owlet moth

Habrosyne petrographa is a moth in the family Drepanidae. It is found in China (Henan, Shaanxi, Gansu, Hunan, Jiangxi, Hubei, Fujian, Sichuan, Yunnan) and Taiwan.

The wingspan is 35–39 mm.

== Subspecies ==
- Habrosyne petrographa petrographa
- Habrosyne petrographa tapaishana Werny 1966 (Taiwan)
