= Habrosyne aurorina =

Scientific classification
- Domain: Eukaryota
- Kingdom: Animalia
- Phylum: Arthropoda
- Class: Insecta
- Order: Lepidoptera
- Family: Drepanidae
- Genus: Habrosyne
- Species: H. aurorina

Binomial name
- Habrosyne aurorina (Butler, 1881)

Synonyms
- Gonophora aurorina Butler, 1881; Thyatira moellendorfi Fixsen, 1887

Species of false owlet moth

Habrosyne aurorina is a moth in the family Drepanidae. It is found in Japan and Korea.
