= Hydropionea lavinia =

Scientific classification
- Domain: Eukaryota
- Kingdom: Animalia
- Phylum: Arthropoda
- Class: Insecta
- Order: Lepidoptera
- Family: Crambidae
- Genus: Hydropionea
- Species: H. lavinia

Binomial name
- Hydropionea lavinia (Schaus, 1912)

Synonyms
- Clupeosoma lavinia Schaus, 1912

Species of moth

Hydropionea lavinia is a moth in the family Crambidae. It was described by Schaus in 1912. It is found in Costa Rica.
