= Longan wine =

Asian fermented drink

Longan wine is a Southeast Asian fermented drink made of the fruit of longan (Dimocarpus longan), also called dragon's eye. While originating in China, it has also become a speciality in a number of locations in Southeast Asia such as the Vietnamese province of Bac Lieu.

== History ==
The longan fruit has long been grown and produced as wine along the Great Wall of China and in the far west, especially in the provinces of Xinjiang, Gansu, Shanxi and Hebei. It gained popularity in the later half of the 20th century. The white wine of dried longan from China's Greatwall Wine Co. was a silver medal winner at the 14th International Wine-Tasting Meeting in London in 1983. Since then, production of longan wine has spread to Southeast Asia. Since 2015, it has been developed commercially on a small scale in Thailand and in Cambodia.

== Preparation ==
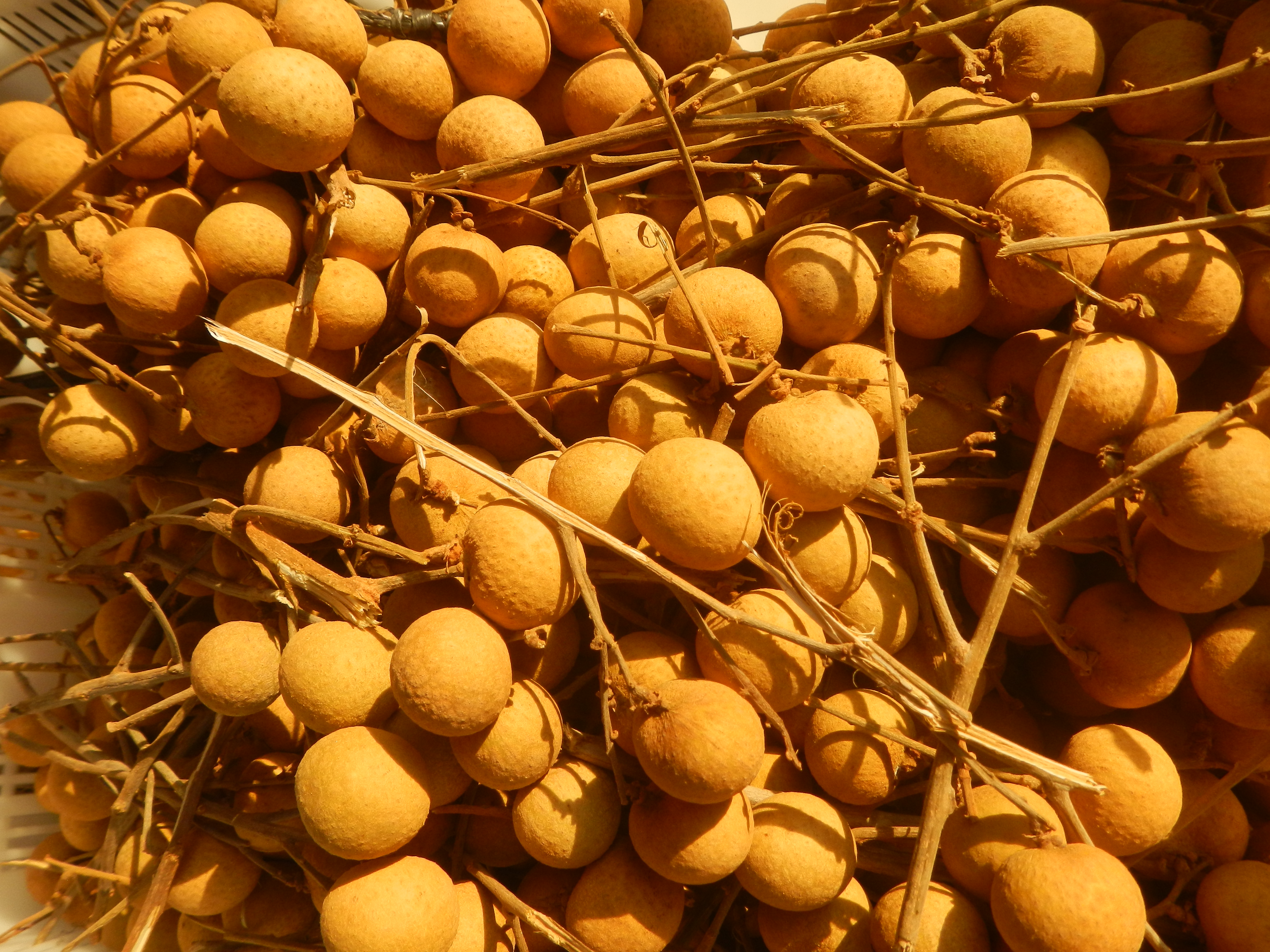
Longan fruits

Longan liqueur is made by macerating the longan flesh in alcohol.

In Southeast Asia, particularly in Northern Thailand, longan fruit is overabundant when in season and therefore it is dried and processed into various products, among which is longan wine. This research was thus aimed to develop the high antioxidant wine from dried longan seed.

Fermentation temperature is suggested at 30°C due to the shorter time of production.

== Health ==
Longan wine is much sweeter than other varieties and should therefore be discouraged in the case of diabetes. However, longan seed is a great source of antioxidants and is naturally extracted during fermentation. As a traditional drink, it is recommended for men's health by the government of Bac Lieu province in Vietnam.
