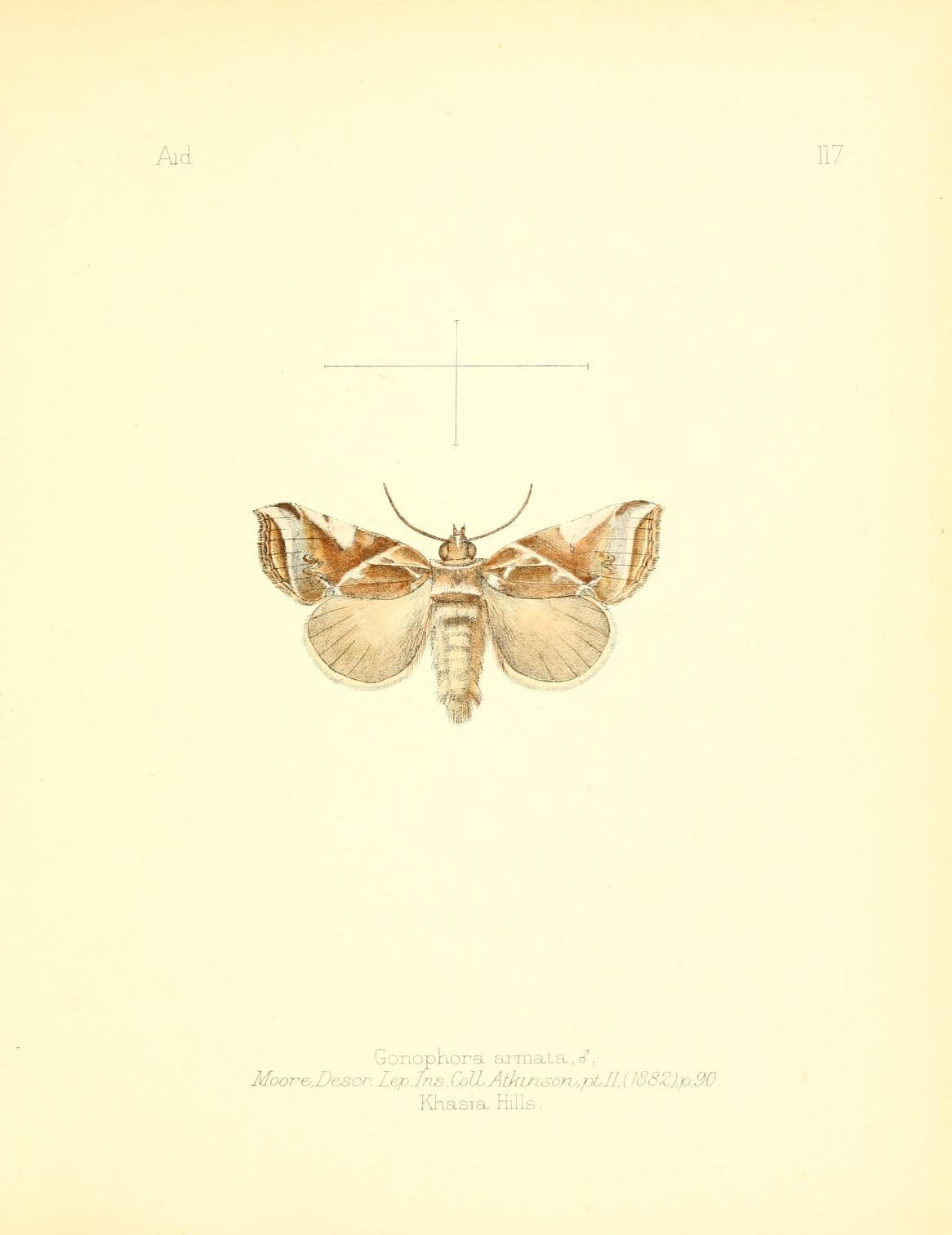

Scientific classification
- Domain: Eukaryota
- Kingdom: Animalia
- Phylum: Arthropoda
- Class: Insecta
- Order: Lepidoptera
- Family: Drepanidae
- Genus: Habrosyne
- Species: H. armata

Binomial name
- Habrosyne armata Moore, 1882

Synonyms
- Gonophora armata Moore, 1882

= Habrosyne armata =

Species of false owlet moth

Habrosyne armata is a moth in the family Drepanidae first described by Frederic Moore in 1882. It is found in the Khasi Hills of India.

The wingspan is about 66 mm. The forewings are ferruginous, with some pale marks at the base and a pinkish oblique line from the costa near the base to the inner margin beyond the middle. There is a postmedial pink patch on the costa and a double highly waved postmedial line, as well as a curved submarginal pink band, with a grey patch on its inner edge. There are also two whitish marginal lines. The hindwings are pale fuscous.
