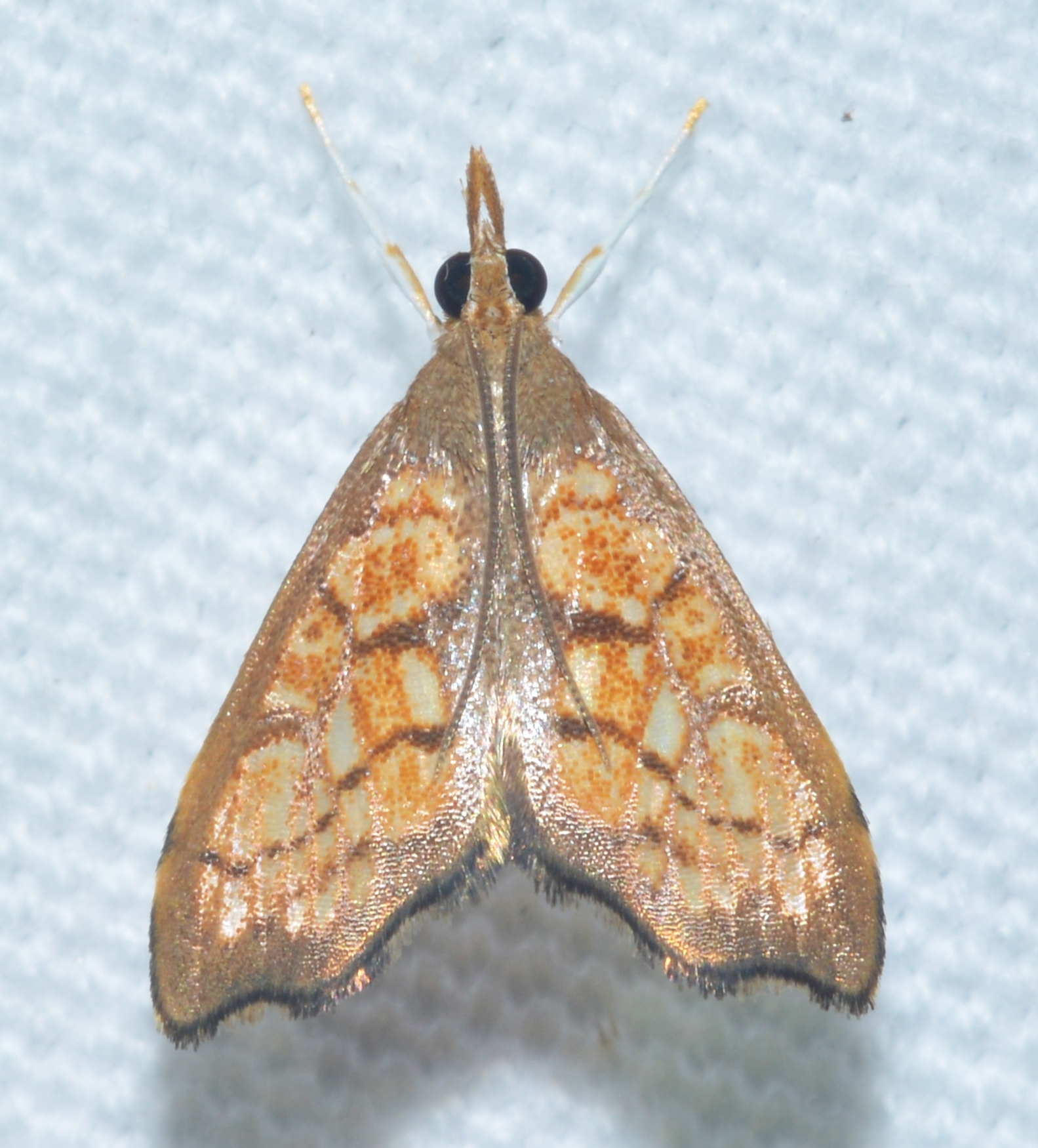

Scientific classification
- Kingdom: Animalia
- Phylum: Arthropoda
- Class: Insecta
- Order: Lepidoptera
- Family: Crambidae
- Genus: Hydropionea
- Species: H. fenestralis

Binomial name
- Hydropionea fenestralis (Barnes & McDunnough, 1914)

Synonyms
- Diasemia fenestralis Barnes & McDunnough, 1914; Clupeosoma fenestralis

= Hydropionea fenestralis =

Species of moth

Hydropionea fenestralis is a species of moth in the family Crambidae. It was first described by William Barnes and James Halliday McDunnough in 1914. It is found in the United States, where it has been recorded from Arizona and Mississippi. It is also found in Durango, Mexico. The habitat consists of mountain regions and alpine pine forests.

The length of the forewings is 12–15 mm. Adults are on wing from May to October.
