= Sympis parkeri =

Scientific classification
- Domain: Eukaryota
- Kingdom: Animalia
- Phylum: Arthropoda
- Class: Insecta
- Order: Lepidoptera
- Superfamily: Noctuoidea
- Family: Erebidae
- Genus: Sympis
- Species: S. parkeri

Binomial name
- Sympis parkeri T. P. Lucas, 1894

Species of moth

Sympis parkeri is a moth of the family Noctuidae first described by Thomas Pennington Lucas in 1894. It is endemic to the Australian state of Queensland.
