= Habrosyne costalis =

Scientific classification
- Domain: Eukaryota
- Kingdom: Animalia
- Phylum: Arthropoda
- Class: Insecta
- Order: Lepidoptera
- Family: Drepanidae
- Genus: Habrosyne
- Species: H. costalis

Binomial name
- Habrosyne costalis Wileman, 1921

Species of false owlet moth

Habrosyne costalis is a moth in the family Drepanidae. It is found in the Philippines (Luzon).
