= Hydropionea melliculalis =

Scientific classification
- Domain: Eukaryota
- Kingdom: Animalia
- Phylum: Arthropoda
- Class: Insecta
- Order: Lepidoptera
- Family: Crambidae
- Genus: Hydropionea
- Species: H. melliculalis

Binomial name
- Hydropionea melliculalis (Lederer, 1863)

Synonyms
- Sparagmia melliculalis Lederer, 1863; Sparagmia molliculalis Lederer, 1863

Species of moth

Hydropionea melliculalis is a moth in the family Crambidae. It was described by Julius Lederer in 1863. It is found in Mexico, Central America and South America.
