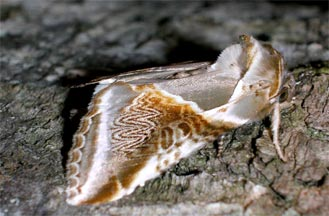

Scientific classification
- Domain: Eukaryota
- Kingdom: Animalia
- Phylum: Arthropoda
- Class: Insecta
- Order: Lepidoptera
- Family: Drepanidae
- Genus: Habrosyne
- Species: H. pyritoides

Binomial name
- Habrosyne pyritoides (Hufnagel, 1766)

Synonyms
- Phalaena (Noctua) pyritoides Hufnagel, 1766; Phalaena (Noctua) derasa Linnaeus, 1767; Gonophora derasoides Butler, 1878; Habrosyne pyritoides ochracea Werny, 1966

= Buff arches =

Species of false owlet moth

The buff arches (Habrosyne pyritoides) is a moth of the family Drepanidae. The species was first described by Johann Siegfried Hufnagel in 1766. It is found throughout Europe and is well distributed in the British Isles except the far north of England and all of Scotland. They live in deciduous and coniferous forests with large populations of their foodplants, but also in gardens and parks.

This is a distinctive and attractive species; its grey-brown forewings are marked with bold buff-orange "arches". The hindwings are grey with white margins. The wingspan is 40–45 mm. It flies from June to August and is attracted to light and sugar.

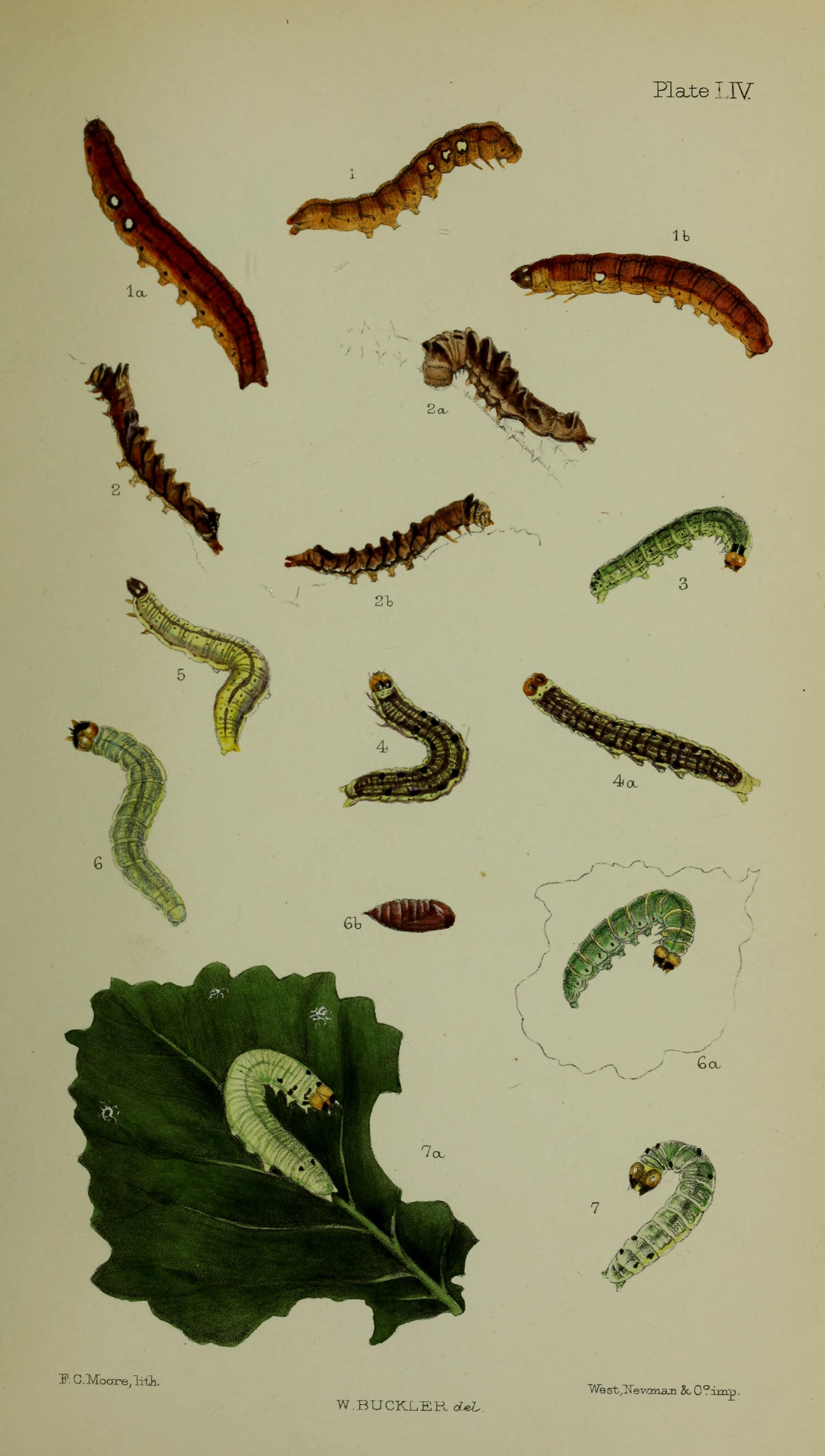
Figs. Figs 1, 1a, 1b larvae after final moult

The young caterpillars are dark brown to grey-brown and more clearly spotted than the later caterpillar stages. These are brown-red and have a narrow dark dorsal line with indistinct light side spots. They have white spots on the sides of the three front abdominal segments, which become smaller to the rear, or just such a spot on the first abdominal segment. The larva feeds on bramble, hawthorn and hazel. The species overwinters as a pupa.

This moth is one of many insects that has been badly affected by light pollution with the species population declining by 62% since the 1970s.

1. The flight season refers to the British Isles. This may vary in other parts of the range.
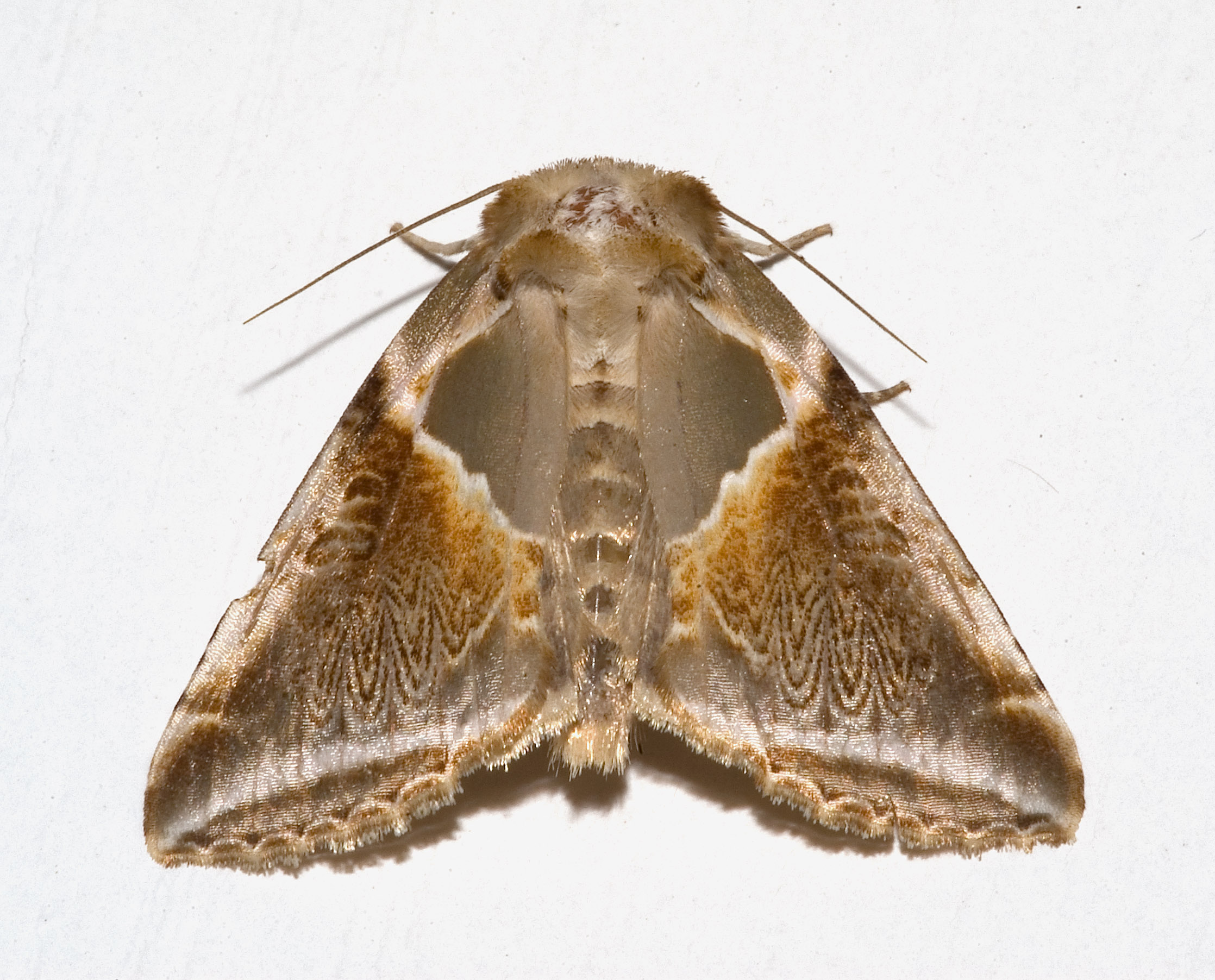

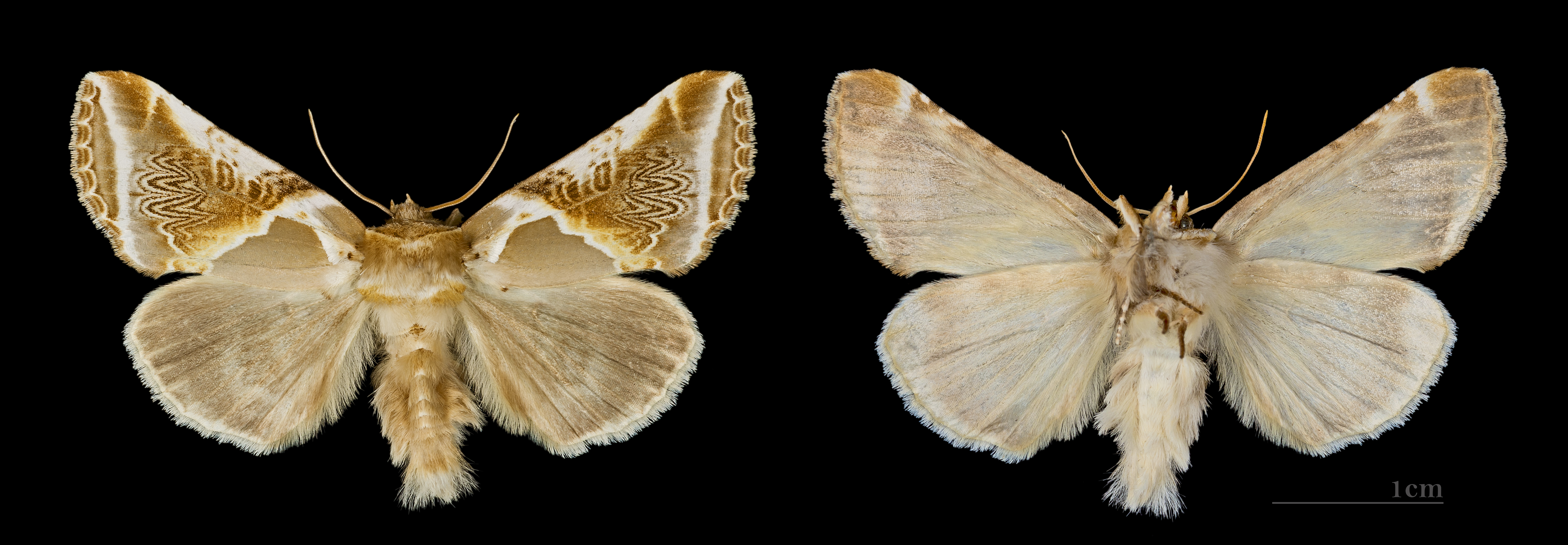
Both sides

== Subspecies ==
- Habrosyne pyritoides pyritoides (Europe, northern Iran)
- Habrosyne pyritoides derasoides (Butler, 1878) (south-eastern Russia, Korean Peninsula, Japan, China: Heilongjiang, Jilin, Liaoning, Beijing, Hebei)
