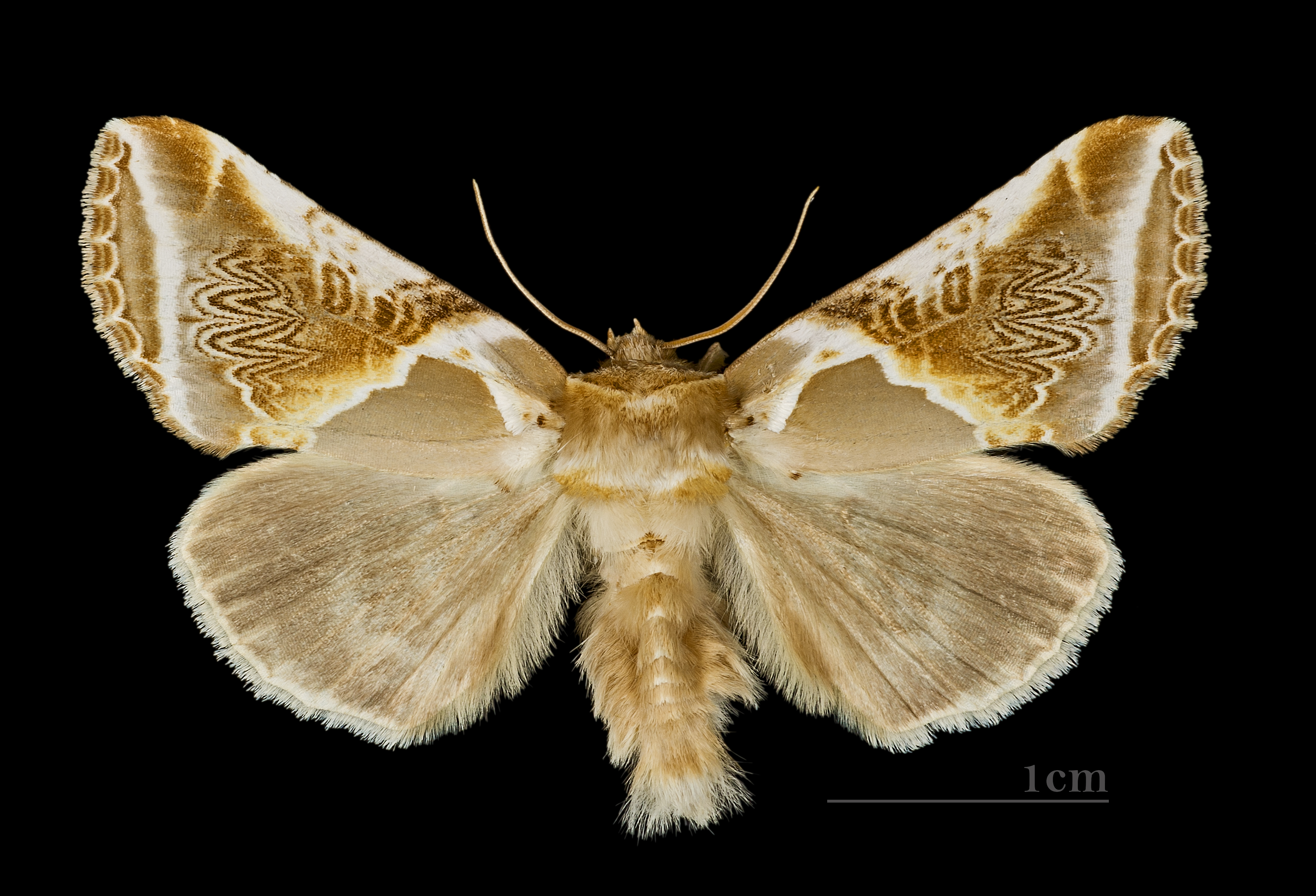
- Habrosyne pyritoides

Scientific classification
- Kingdom: Animalia
- Phylum: Arthropoda
- Clade: Pancrustacea
- Class: Insecta
- Order: Lepidoptera
- Family: Drepanidae
- Subfamily: Thyatirinae
- Genus: Habrosyne; Hübner, 1816

Synonyms
- Gonophora Bruand, 1845; Cymatochrocis Houlbert, 1921; Hannya Matsumura, 1927; Miothyatira Matsumura, 1933; Habrosynula Bryk, 1943

= Habrosyne =

Moth genus in family Drepanidae

Habrosyne is a genus of moths belonging to the family Drepanidae. It was first described by Jacob Hübner in 1816.

== Species ==
- Habrosyne albipuncta (Wileman, 1911)
  - Habrosyne albipuncta angulifera (Gaede, 1930)
- Habrosyne armata Moore, 1882
- Habrosyne aurorina (Butler, 1881)
- Habrosyne costalis Wileman, 1921
- Habrosyne dentata Werny, 1966
- Habrosyne dieckmanni (Graeser, 1888)
- Habrosyne fraterna Moore, 1888
- Habrosyne indica (Moore, 1867)
- Habrosyne gloriosa (Guenée, 1852)
- Habrosyne intermedia (Bremer, 1864)
  - Habrosyne intermedia conscripta Warren, 1912
- Habrosyne obscura Roepke, 1944
- Habrosyne plagiosa Moore, 1882
- Habrosyne pterographa (Poujade, 1887)
- Habrosyne pyritoides (Hufnagel, 1766)
- Habrosyne sanguinea Moore, 1882
- Habrosyne scripta (Gosse, 1840)
- Habrosyne sumatrana Werny, 1966
- Habrosyne violacea (Fixsen, 1887)
  - Habrosyne violacea argenteipuncta Hampson, 1893
