= Habrosyne plagiosa =

Scientific classification
- Domain: Eukaryota
- Kingdom: Animalia
- Phylum: Arthropoda
- Class: Insecta
- Order: Lepidoptera
- Family: Drepanidae
- Genus: Habrosyne
- Species: H. plagiosa

Binomial name
- Habrosyne plagiosa Moore, 1882

Species of false owlet moth

Habrosyne plagiosa is a moth in the family Drepanidae first described by Frederic Moore in 1882. It is found in Sikkim, India.

The wingspan is about 56 mm (2 in). The forewings are pinkish brown with an antemedial oblique pink line met below the costa by an oblique line from near the base. The area beyond the antemedial line is suffused with brown and there are some short faint waved brown lines from the costa. The orbicular spot is represented by a speck and the reniform is elongate, with a dark outline. There is also a faint waved double postmedial line filled in with bright chestnut towards the inner margin and a curved pink band from the apex to the outer angle. The hindwings are fuscous.
