= Hydropionea barnesalis =

Scientific classification
- Kingdom: Animalia
- Phylum: Arthropoda
- Class: Insecta
- Order: Lepidoptera
- Family: Crambidae
- Genus: Hydropionea
- Species: H. barnesalis

Binomial name
- Hydropionea barnesalis (Dyar, 1923)

Synonyms
- Clupeosoma barnesalis Dyar, 1923

Species of moth

Hydropionea barnesalis is a moth in the family Crambidae. It was described by Harrison Gray Dyar Jr. in 1923. It is found in Guatemala.
