= Dimocarpus dentatus =

Scientific classification
- Kingdom: Plantae
- Clade: Tracheophytes
- Clade: Angiosperms
- Clade: Eudicots
- Clade: Rosids
- Order: Sapindales
- Family: Sapindaceae
- Genus: Dimocarpus
- Species: D. dentatus

Binomial name
- Dimocarpus dentatus Meijer ex Leenh.

Species of flowering plant

Dimocarpus dentatus is a species of tree related to the Longan. Its distribution ranges from southeast Asia to western New Guinea.
