= Habrosyne albipuncta =

Scientific classification
- Domain: Eukaryota
- Kingdom: Animalia
- Phylum: Arthropoda
- Class: Insecta
- Order: Lepidoptera
- Family: Drepanidae
- Genus: Habrosyne
- Species: H. albipuncta

Binomial name
- Habrosyne albipuncta (Wileman, 1911)

Synonyms
- Thyatira albipuncta Wileman, 1911; Thyatira angulifera Gaede, 1930; Habrosyne albipuncta szechwanensis Werny 1966

Species of false owlet moth

Habrosyne albipuncta is a moth in the family Drepanidae. It is found in Taiwan, China (Fujian, Sichuan, Yunnan), Vietnam, Thailand and Myanmar.

Habrosyne Albipunctas are also nocturnal meaning they sleep during the day and are awake at night.

== Subspecies ==
- Habrosyne albipuncta albipuncta (Taiwan)
- Habrosyne albipuncta angulifera (Gaede, 1930) (Vietnam, Thailand, Myanmar, China: Fujian, Sichuan, Yunnan)
