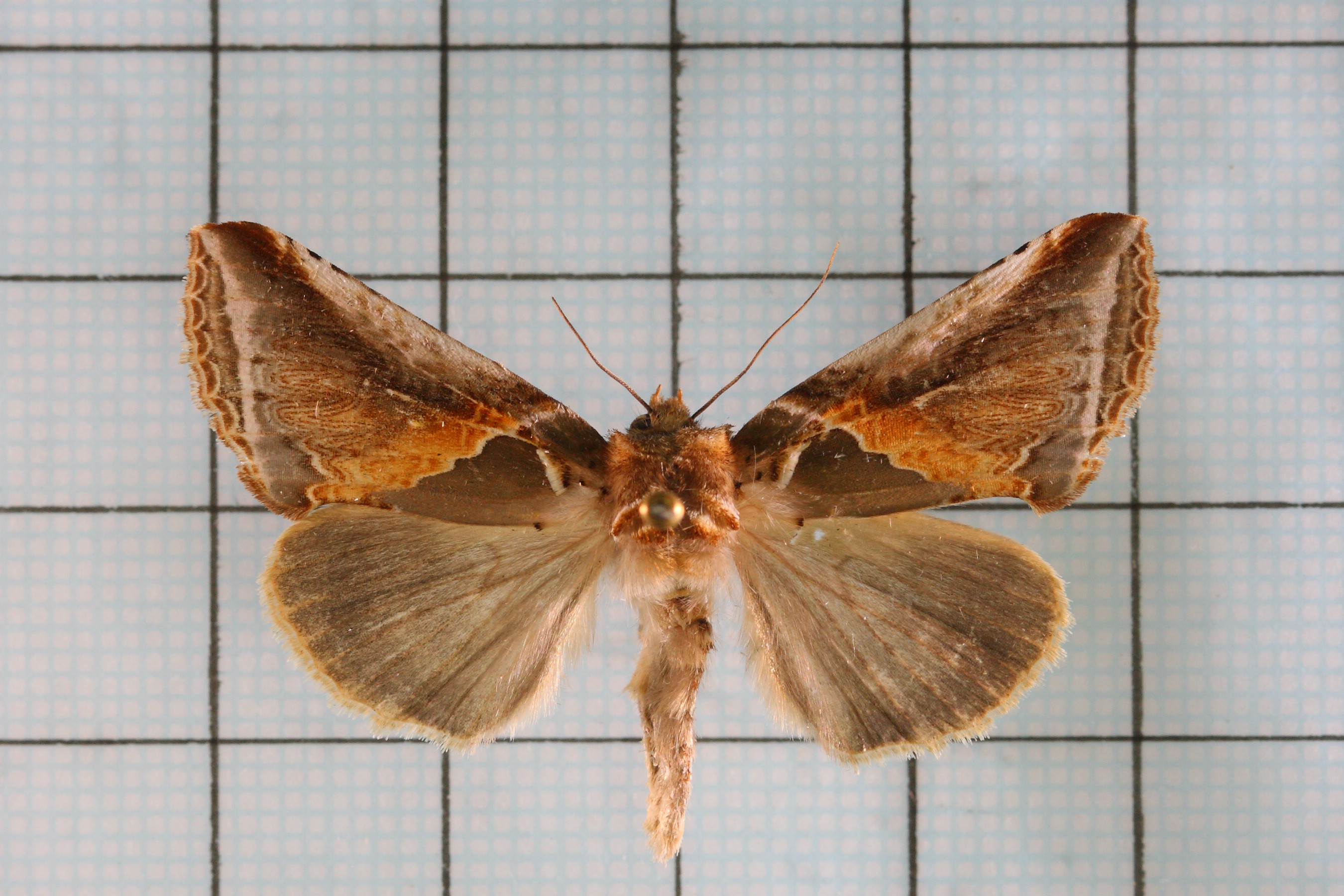

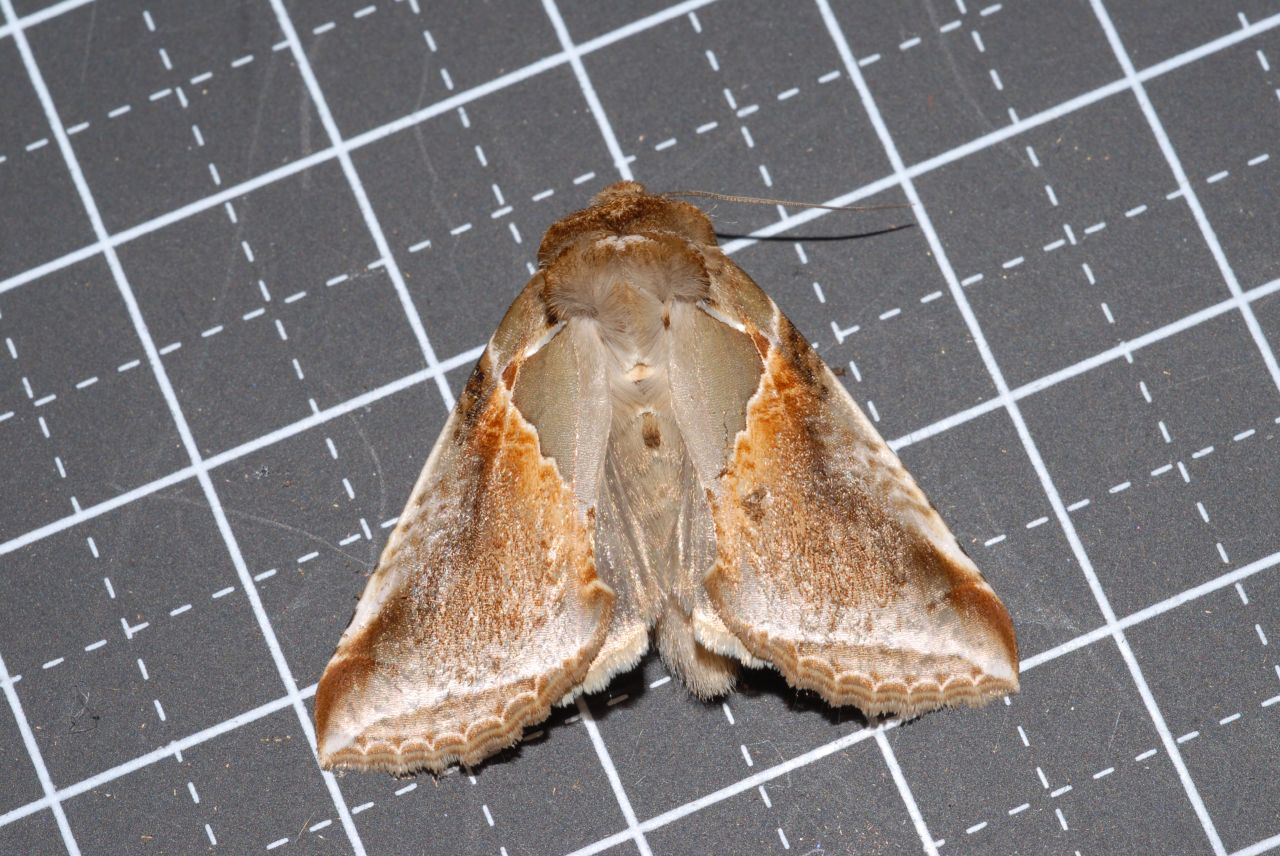

Scientific classification
- Kingdom: Animalia
- Phylum: Arthropoda
- Class: Insecta
- Order: Lepidoptera
- Family: Drepanidae
- Genus: Habrosyne
- Species: H. indica

Binomial name
- Habrosyne indica (Moore, 1867)

Synonyms
- Gonophora indica Moore, 1867; Habrosyne fraterna malaisei Bryk, 1943; Habrosyne fraterna chekiangensis Werny, 1966; Habrosyne fraterna japonica Werny, 1966; Habrosyne indica grisea Werny, 1966; Habrosyne indica flavescens Werny, 1966; Habrosyne indica aurata Werny, 1966

= Habrosyne indica =

Species of false owlet moth

Habrosyne indica is a moth in the family Drepanidae. It is found from India to Taiwan and Japan.

The wingspan is 40–46 mm.

== Subspecies ==
- Habrosyne indica indica (Japan, India, Nepal, Myanmar, Vietnam, Thailand, China: Heilongjiang, Jilin, Hebei, Henan, Shaanxi, Zhejiang, Hubei, Jiangxi, Hunan, Fujian, Guangdong, Guangxi, Sichuan, Yunnan, Tibet)
- Habrosyne indica formosana Werny, 1966 (Taiwan)
