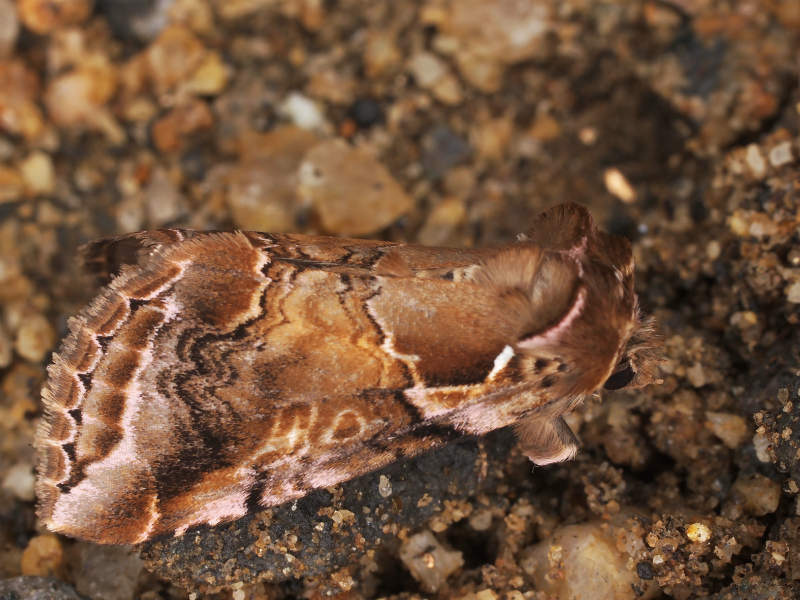

Scientific classification
- Domain: Eukaryota
- Kingdom: Animalia
- Phylum: Arthropoda
- Class: Insecta
- Order: Lepidoptera
- Family: Drepanidae
- Genus: Habrosyne
- Species: H. dieckmanni

Binomial name
- Habrosyne dieckmanni (Graeser, 1888)

Synonyms
- Gonophora dieckmanni Graeser, 1888; Habrosyne roseola Matsumura, 1909; Habrosyne dieckmanni urupina Bryk, 1941

= Habrosyne dieckmanni =

Species of false owlet moth

Habrosyne dieckmanni is a moth in the family Drepanidae. It is found in the Russian Far East, Japan, north-eastern China (Heilongjiang, Jilin) and Korea.

The larvae feed on Rubus species.
