= Hydropionea rufalis =

Scientific classification
- Kingdom: Animalia
- Phylum: Arthropoda
- Class: Insecta
- Order: Lepidoptera
- Family: Crambidae
- Genus: Hydropionea
- Species: H. rufalis

Binomial name
- Hydropionea rufalis (Hampson, 1917)

Synonyms
- Parthenodes rufalis Hampson, 1917

Species of moth

Hydropionea rufalis is a moth in the family Crambidae. It was described by George Hampson in 1917. It is found in Colombia.
