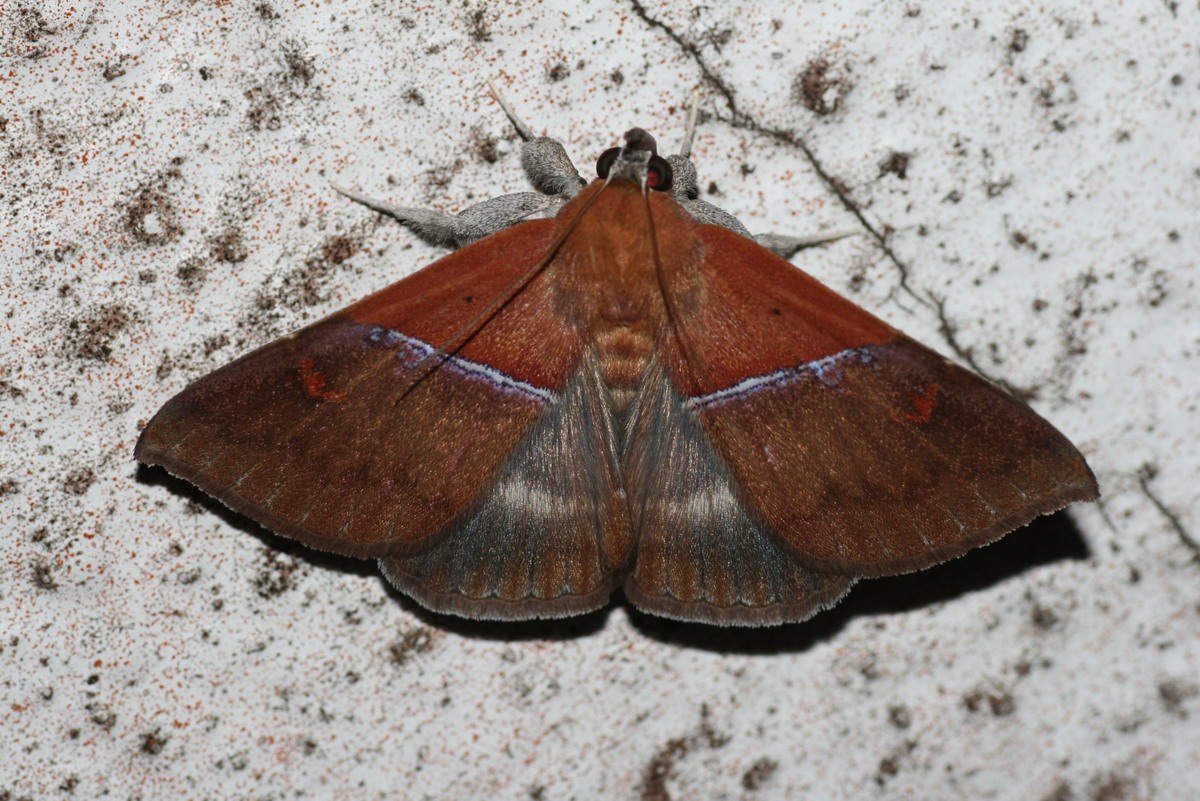
- Sympis rufibasis

Scientific classification
- Kingdom: Animalia
- Phylum: Arthropoda
- Class: Insecta
- Order: Lepidoptera
- Superfamily: Noctuoidea
- Family: Erebidae
- Subfamily: Calpinae
- Genus: Sympis; Guenée in Boisduval & Guenée, 1852

= Sympis =

Genus of moths

Sympis is a genus of moths of the family Noctuidae erected by Achille Guenée in 1852.

== Description ==
Palpi upturned and smoothly scaled, where the second joint reaching above vertex of head and long slightly curved third joint. Antennae ciliated in male. Thorax and abdomen smoothly scaled. Tibia spineless, and hairy. The first joint of hind tarsi hairy on the upperside. Forewings with somewhat produced and acute apex.

== Species ==
- Sympis ochreobasis Pagenstecher, 1900
- Sympis parkeri Lucas, 1894
- Sympis rufibasis Guenée, 1852
