= Dimocarpus fumatus =

Scientific classification
- Kingdom: Plantae
- Clade: Tracheophytes
- Clade: Angiosperms
- Clade: Eudicots
- Clade: Rosids
- Order: Sapindales
- Family: Sapindaceae
- Genus: Dimocarpus
- Species: D. fumatus

Binomial name
- Dimocarpus fumatus (Blume) Leenh.

Synonyms
- Nephelium fumatum Blume; Pseudonephelium fumatum (Blume) Radlk.

Species of flowering plant

Dimocarpus fumatus is an Asian tree species in the family Sapindaceae.

== Description ==
In its natural habitat, D. fumatus is a mid-canopy tropical forest tree, growing up to 35 m tall and 0.6 m dbh. Stipules are absent; leaves are alternate, compound, with leaflets pinnately-veined and usually glabrous, sometimes with toothed margins. Flowers are about 4 mm in diameter, white-yellowish, in panicles. Fruits are drupes which are 20–25 mm long, green-yellowish and slightly warty.

== Subspecies ==
The Catalogue of Life and Plants of the World Online list:

- D. fumatus subsp. calcicola C.Y.Wu
- D. fumatus subsp. indochinensis Leenh.
- D. fumatus subsp. javensis Leenh.
- D. fumatus subsp. philippinensis Leenh.
