= Habrosyne violacea =

Scientific classification
- Domain: Eukaryota
- Kingdom: Animalia
- Phylum: Arthropoda
- Class: Insecta
- Order: Lepidoptera
- Family: Drepanidae
- Genus: Habrosyne
- Species: H. violacea

Binomial name
- Habrosyne violacea (Fixsen, 1887)

Synonyms
- Thyatira violacea Fixsen, 1887; Habrosyne argenteipuncta chinensis Werny 1966; Habrosyne argenteipuncta szechwana Werny 1966; Habrosyne argenteipuncta pallescens Werny 1966; Habrosyne argenteipuncta Hampson, 1893; Habrosyne argenteipuncta nigricans Werny 1966; Habrosyne argenteipuncta burmanica Werny 1966

Species of false owlet moth

Habrosyne violacea is a moth in the family Drepanidae. It is found in the Russian Far East, Korea, China, Myanmar, Vietnam, Nepal and Sikkim, India.

Its wingspan is about 38 mm and its forewings are olive brown with some blue-grey streaks from the costa and a silvery subbasal spot below the median nervure. There is a medial dark band with waved edges occupying the middle third of the wing, with some yellow on its outer edge towards the inner margin. The reniform is outlined with blue grey and the marginal area is suffused with blue grey. The hindwings are fuscous.

== Subspecies ==
- Habrosyne violacea violacea (south-eastern Russia, Korean Peninsula, China: Jilin, Shaanxi, Gansu, Zhejiang, Hubei, Hunan, Fujian, Hainan, Sichuan)
- Habrosyne violacea argenteipuncta Hampson, 1893 (Vietnam, Myanmar, Nepal, India: Sikkim, China: Yunnan, Tibet)
