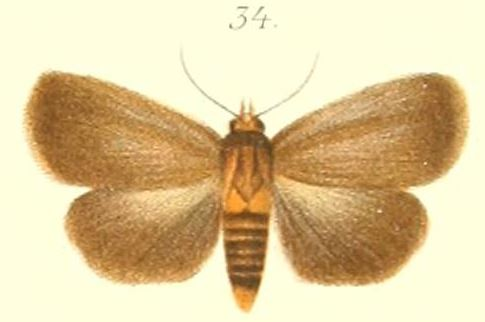

Scientific classification
- Domain: Eukaryota
- Kingdom: Animalia
- Phylum: Arthropoda
- Class: Insecta
- Order: Lepidoptera
- Superfamily: Noctuoidea
- Family: Erebidae
- Genus: Sympis
- Species: S. ochreobasis

Binomial name
- Sympis ochreobasis Pagenstecher, 1900

= Sympis ochreobasis =

Species of moth

Sympis ochreobasis is a moth of the family Noctuidae first described by Pagenstecher in 1900. It is endemic to the Bismarck Islands of Papua New Guinea.
