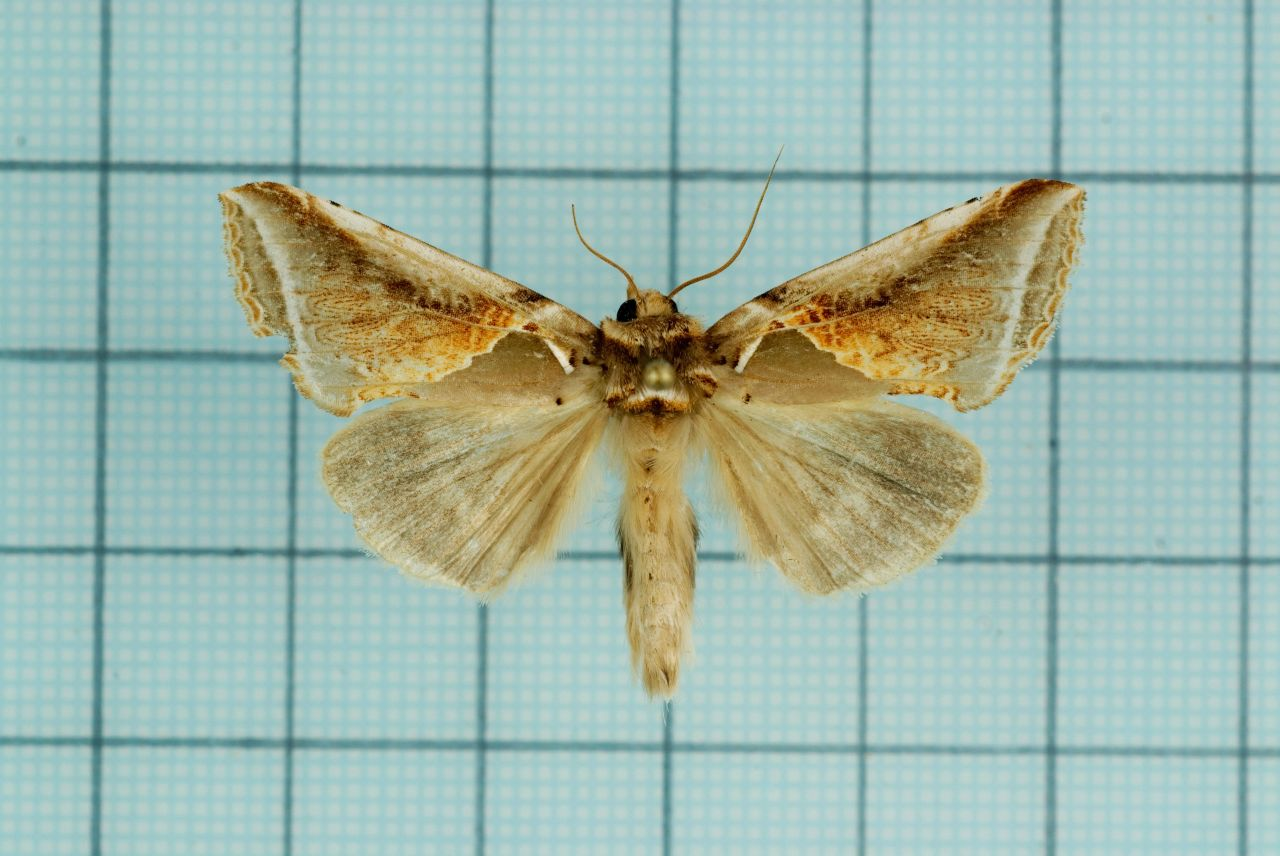

Scientific classification
- Domain: Eukaryota
- Kingdom: Animalia
- Phylum: Arthropoda
- Class: Insecta
- Order: Lepidoptera
- Family: Drepanidae
- Genus: Habrosyne
- Species: H. fraterna

Binomial name
- Habrosyne fraterna Moore, 1888

= Habrosyne fraterna =

Species of false owlet moth

Habrosyne fraterna is a moth in the family Drepanidae. It is found in India (Himachal Pradesh).
