= Hydropionea oblectalis =

Scientific classification
- Domain: Eukaryota
- Kingdom: Animalia
- Phylum: Arthropoda
- Class: Insecta
- Order: Lepidoptera
- Family: Crambidae
- Genus: Hydropionea
- Species: H. oblectalis

Binomial name
- Hydropionea oblectalis (Hulst, 1886)

Synonyms
- Botis oblectalis Hulst, 1886; Clupeosoma eumoros Dyar, 1917

Species of moth

Hydropionea oblectalis is a moth in the family Crambidae. It was described by George Duryea Hulst in 1886. It is found in North America, where it has been recorded from Arizona.
