= Dentatus =

Dentatus may refer to:

- Manius Curius Dentatus (died 270 BC), son of Manius, a three-time consul and a plebeian hero of the Roman Republic
- Dimocarpus dentatus, a species of tree related to the Longan

== See also ==
- Dentatum
