= Hydropionea dentata =

Scientific classification
- Domain: Eukaryota
- Kingdom: Animalia
- Phylum: Arthropoda
- Class: Insecta
- Order: Lepidoptera
- Family: Crambidae
- Genus: Hydropionea
- Species: H. dentata

Binomial name
- Hydropionea dentata (H. Druce, 1895)

Synonyms
- Sufetula dentata H. Druce, 1895

Species of moth

Hydropionea dentata is a moth in the family Crambidae. It was described by Herbert Druce in 1895. It is found in Guatemala.
