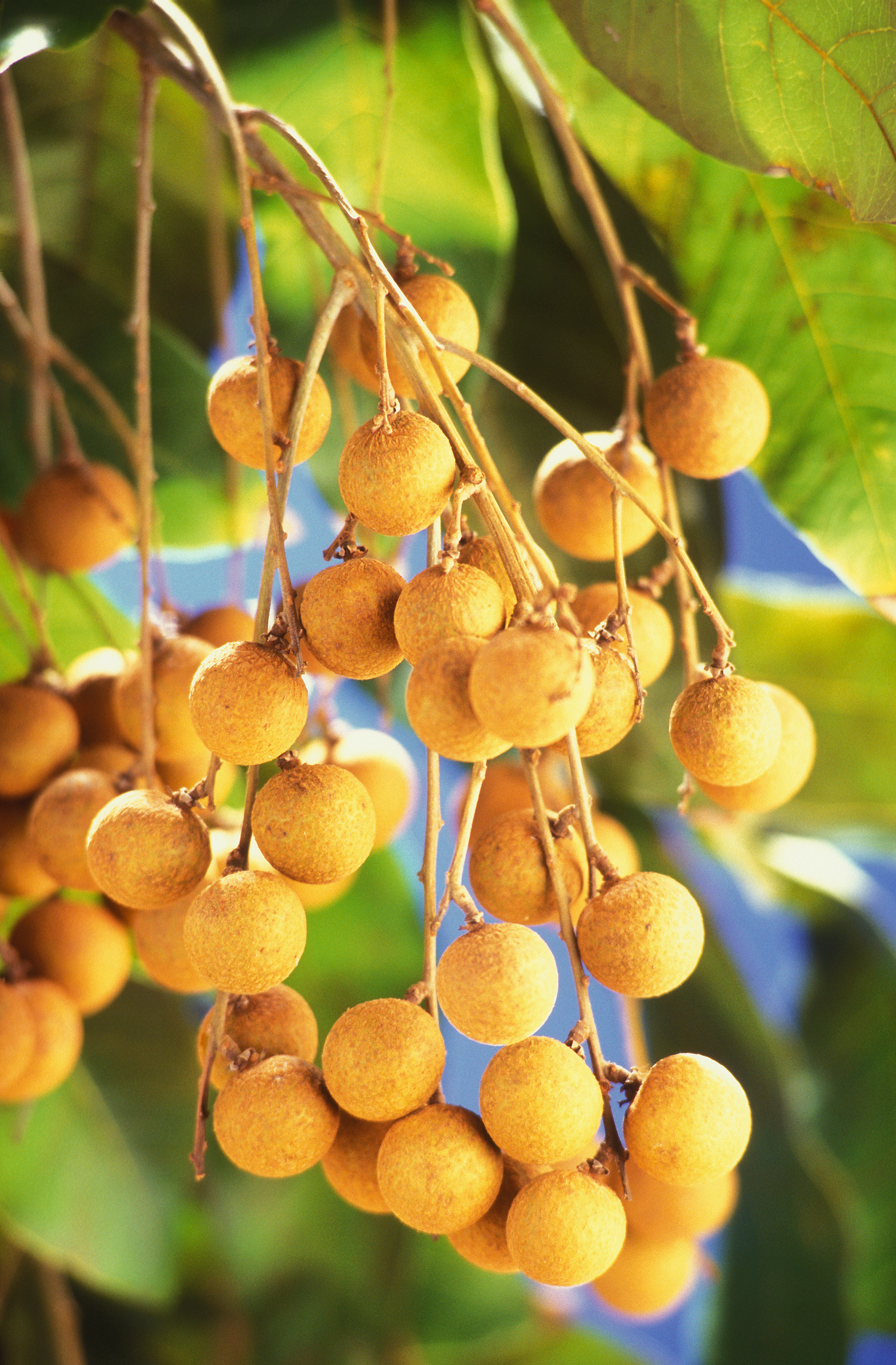
- Dimocarpus longan fruit

Scientific classification
- Kingdom: Plantae
- Clade: Tracheophytes
- Clade: Angiosperms
- Clade: Eudicots
- Clade: Rosids
- Order: Sapindales
- Family: Sapindaceae
- Tribe: Nephelieae
- Genus: Dimocarpus; Lour. (1790)

Species
- 7; see text

Synonyms
- Pseudonephelium Radlk. (1890)

= Dimocarpus =

Genus of flowering plants

Dimocarpus is a genus of trees or shrubs in the flowering plant family Sapindaceae. It includes 7 species which grow naturally in tropical south and Southeast Asia, Malesia, Papuasia, and Australasia, including Sri Lanka, India, the Philippines, southern China, Taiwan, Myanmar, Cambodia, Vietnam, Malaysia, Indonesia, New Guinea, East Timor, far north-eastern Queensland, Australia.

The fruit is edible, with the longan (D. longan) being grown commercially for fruit production.

The species are large evergreen trees growing to 25–40 m tall, with pinnate leaves. The flowers are individually inconspicuous, produced in large panicles. The fruit is an oval drupe 3–5 cm long containing a single seed surrounded by a translucent crisp, juicy layer of fruit pulp and a thin but hard orange or red skin.

== Species ==
Image	Scientific name	Common name	Distribution
	Dimocarpus australianus Leenh.		Cape York Peninsula, Australia
	Dimocarpus dentatus Meijer ex Leenh.		Malaysia, Sabah
	Dimocarpus foveolatus (Radlk.) Leenh.		Philippines (Luzon, Panay, Samar)
	Dimocarpus fumatus (Blume) Leenh.		S and SE Asia from Sri Lanka and India to E Malesia; D. fumatus subsp. indochinensis in China and Vietnam
	Dimocarpus gardneri (Thwaites) Leenh.		Sri Lanka.
	Dimocarpus longan Lour.	Longan	China, Taiwan, Vietnam and Thailand
	Dimocarpus malesianus	Alupag	Sarawak, Malesia
	Dimocarpus yunnanensis (W.T.Wang) C.Y.Wu & T.L.Ming		China
