= Habrosyne dentata =

Scientific classification
- Domain: Eukaryota
- Kingdom: Animalia
- Phylum: Arthropoda
- Class: Insecta
- Order: Lepidoptera
- Family: Drepanidae
- Genus: Habrosyne
- Species: H. dentata

Binomial name
- Habrosyne dentata Werny, 1966

Species of false owlet moth

Habrosyne dentata is a moth in the family Drepanidae. It is found in China (Shaanxi, Sichuan, Yunnan).
