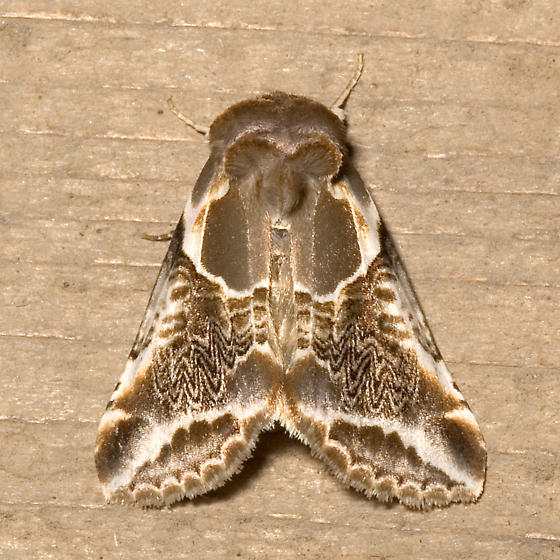

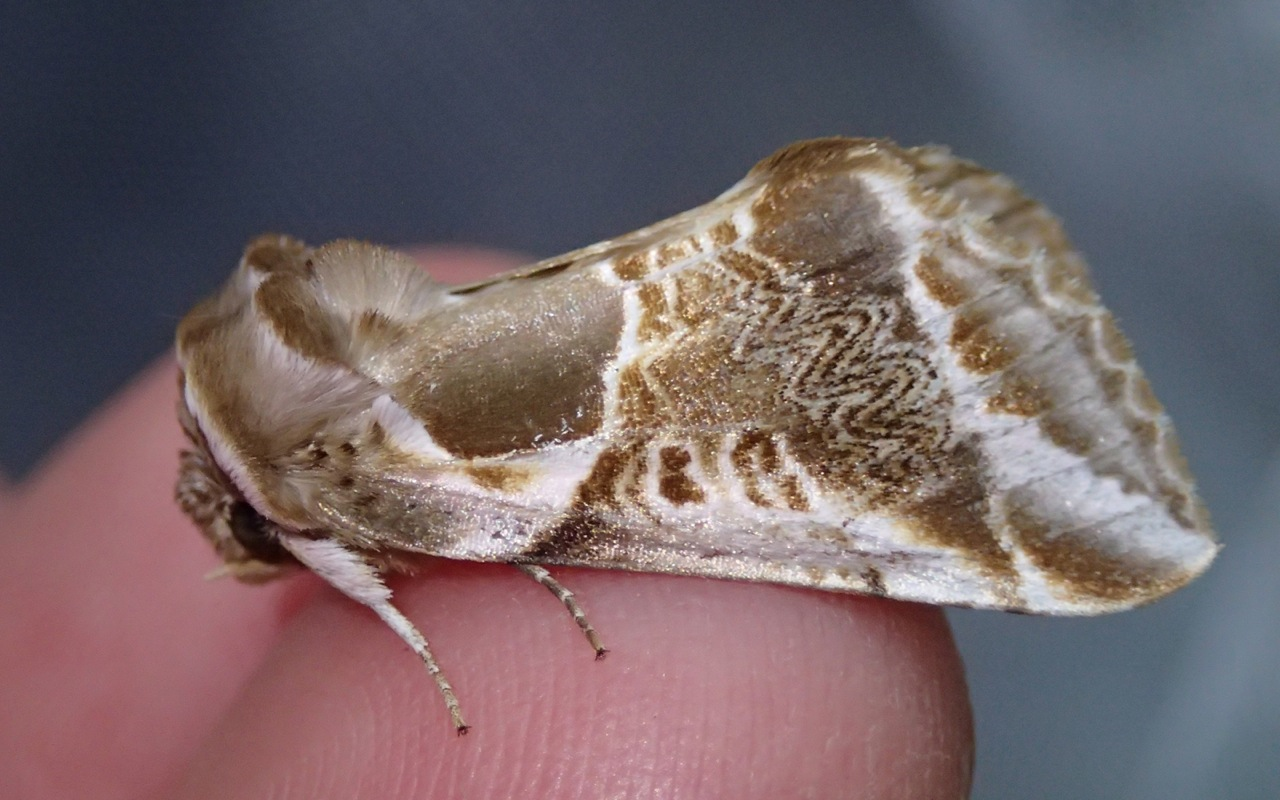

Scientific classification
- Domain: Eukaryota
- Kingdom: Animalia
- Phylum: Arthropoda
- Class: Insecta
- Order: Lepidoptera
- Family: Drepanidae
- Genus: Habrosyne
- Species: H. scripta

Binomial name
- Habrosyne scripta (Gosse, 1840)

Synonyms
- Thyatira scripta Gosse, 1840; Thyatira abrasa Guenée, 1852; Habrosyne scripta chatfieldii Grote, 1895; Habrosyne scripta abrasoides Barnes & Benjamin, 1929

= Habrosyne scripta =

Species of false owlet moth

Habrosyne scripta, the lettered habrosyne or scribe, is a moth of the family Drepanidae. It was first described by Philip Henry Gosse in 1840. It is found in southern Canada and the northern United States, from Labrador to Vancouver Island, south in the Appalachians, Ozarks and Rocky Mountains to North Carolina and Mississippi and south in the west to Arizona.

The wingspan is 30–39 mm. Adults are on wing from May to August. There are two generations per year.

The larvae feed on the leaves of Rubus species (including black raspberry and purple-flowering raspberry).
