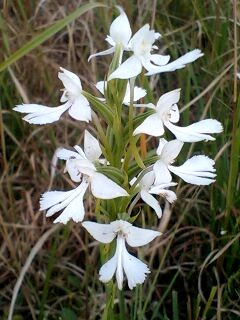

Scientific classification
- Kingdom: Plantae
- Clade: Tracheophytes
- Clade: Angiosperms
- Clade: Monocots
- Order: Asparagales
- Family: Orchidaceae
- Subfamily: Orchidoideae
- Genus: Habenaria
- Species: H. dentata

Binomial name
- Habenaria dentata (Sw.) Schltr.

Synonyms
- See text

= Habenaria dentata =

Species of orchid

Habenaria dentata is a species of orchid native to the Himalaya, China, India, Indochina, Thailand, Myanmar, Bhutan, Malaysia, Cambodia, Laos, Vietnam, the Philippines, Taiwan, and Japan. It has many common names, including, the Toothed Habenaria, Dai-Sagi-So, Seitaka-sagi-s, Mao Yu Feng Hua, Wan khao nieo, and Ueang khao tok.

== Description ==
The whole plant is about 35 to 80 cm in height. It has a smooth round tuber that give rise to a single plant. Lower part of stem sheathed, middle leafy and upper part bracteate. Leaves 4 to 6 cm long, oblong to elliptic, 5 nerved, sometimes 7 also, the base of the leaf narrowed into a long tubular sheath. Spike 4 to 8 cm long, laxly flowered. Sepals sub-equal, broadly ovate, acute, spreading, the lateral pair sub-erect. Petals narrowly oblong, sub-acute, curved inwards, shorter than the sepals. Lip as long as the sepals, variable in breadth, with large cuneate or rounded, fimbriate or crenate side lobes and a small oblong entire apical lobe. Spur infundibuliform at the base, slender laterally compressed, geniculate, sub-clavate below the knee, longer than the shortly stalked beaked ovary. Stigmas separated by the area in the centre by the orifice of the spur. It generally blooms in August- September.

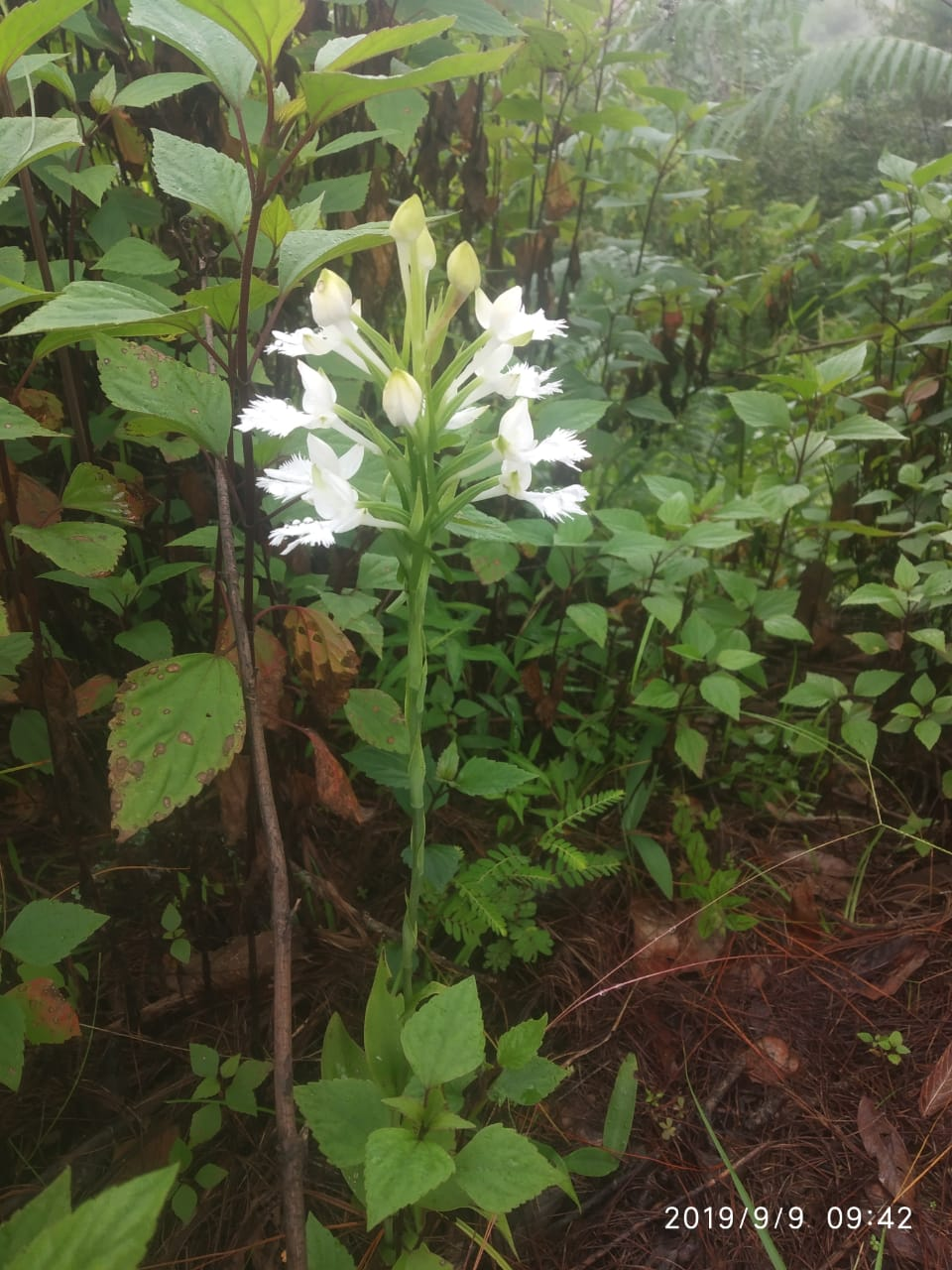

== Synonyms ==
Orchis dentata Sw. is the basionym. Other synonyms include:

- Habenaria dentata f. ecalcarata (King & Pantl.) Tuyama
- Habenaria dentata ssp. ecalcarata (King & Pantl.) Panigrahi & Murti
- Habenaria dentata var. ecalcarata (King & Pantl.) Hand.-Mazz.
- Habenaria dentata var. parageniculata (Tang & F.T. Wang) Aver.
- Habenaria dentata var. tohoensis (Hayata) S.S. Ying
- Habenaria finetiana Schltr.
- Habenaria geniculata D.Don
- Habenaria geniculata var. ecalcarata King & Pantl.
- Habenaria miersiana Champ. ex Benth.
- Habenaria miersiana var. yunnanensis Finet
- Habenaria parageniculata Tang & F.T. Wang
- Habenaria sieboldiana Miq.
- Habenaria tienensis Tang & F.T. Wang
- Habenaria tohoensis Hayata
- Orchis geniculata Buch.-Ham. ex D. Don
- Plantaginorchis dentata (Sw.) Szlach.
- Plantaginorchis finetiana (Schltr.) Szlach.
- Platanthera dentata (Sw.) Lindl.
- Platanthera geniculata (D. Don) Lindl. ex Wall.
