= Harpagomorpha dentata =

Scientific classification
- Kingdom: Animalia
- Phylum: Arthropoda
- Subphylum: Myriapoda
- Class: Diplopoda
- Order: Polydesmida
- Family: Paradoxosomatidae
- Subfamily: Paradoxosomatinae
- Tribe: Sulciferini
- Genus: Harpagomorpha; Jeekel, 1980
- Species: H. dentata

Binomial name
- Harpagomorpha dentata (Carl, 1932)

Synonyms
- Orthomorpha dentata

Genus of millipedes

Harpagomorpha dentata is a species of millipede in the family Paradoxosomatidae. It is the only species in the genus Harpagomorpha, known from Nilgiri mountains, Southern India. H. dentata was originally described by Swiss zoologist Johann Carl in 1932 under the name Orthomorpha dentata, and transferred to its own genus by Dutch zoologist C. A. W. Jeekel in 1980.
