= Dentata =

Dentata is Latin for "toothed" and may refer to:

- Dana Dentata, Canadian musician and model
- Fascia dentata, the earliest stage of the hippocampal circuit in the brain
- Vagina dentata, the myth of the "toothed vagina"

== See also ==
- Dentatus (disambiguation)
- Dentatum
