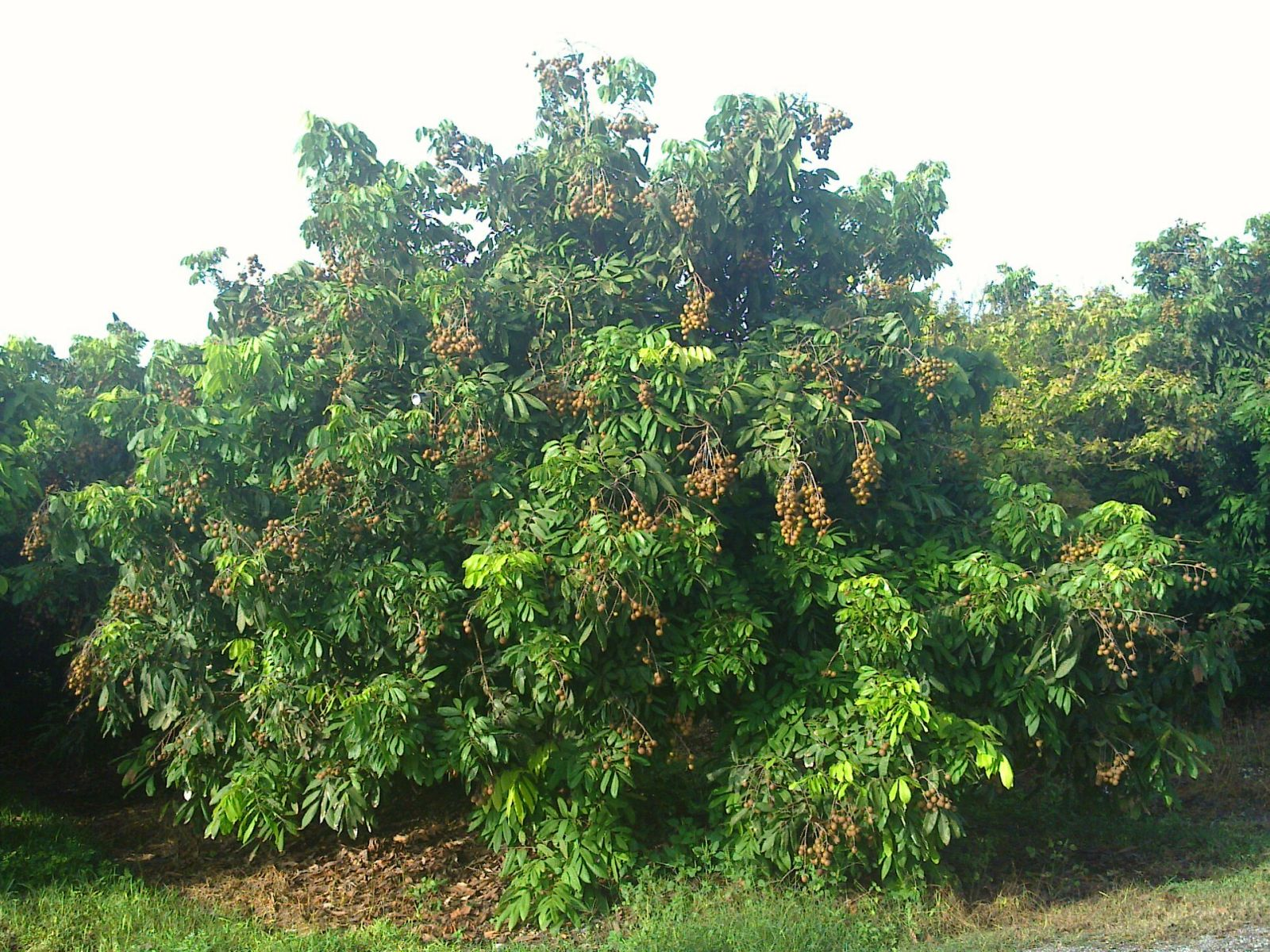

Conservation status
- Data Deficient (IUCN 3.1)

Scientific classification
- Kingdom: Plantae
- Clade: Tracheophytes
- Clade: Angiosperms
- Clade: Eudicots
- Clade: Rosids
- Order: Sapindales
- Family: Sapindaceae
- Genus: Dimocarpus
- Species: D. longan

Binomial name
- Dimocarpus longan Lour.

Synonyms
- Euphoria longan (Lour.) Steud.; Scytalia longan (Lour.) Roxb.

= Longan =

Species of tropical fruit-bearing tree

Longan (/ˈlɒŋɑːn/; Dimocarpus longan), also called lungan or dragon's eye, is a tropical tree species that produces edible fruit. It is one of the better-known tropical members of the soapberry family Sapindaceae, to which the lychee and rambutan also belong. The fruit of the longan is similar to lychee, but has a milder, and more subtle aroma and sweetness. The species is native to Southeast Asia and southern China. Today, China, Thailand, and Vietnam are the largest producers of longan fruit, together accounting for approximately 95% of global production.

Longan
- "Longan" in Traditional (top) and Simplified (bottom) Chinese characters
- Traditional Chinese: 龍眼
- Simplified Chinese: 龙眼
- Literal meaning: 'dragon eye'
Transcriptions
Standard Mandarin
- Hanyu Pinyin: lóngyǎn
- Bopomofo: ㄌㄨㄥˊ ㄧㄢˇ
- Wade–Giles: lung^{2}-yen^{3}
- IPA: [lʊ̌ŋ.jɛ̀n]
Wu
- Suzhounese: lon^{2}-nge^{6}
Yue: Cantonese
- Yale Romanization: lùhng-ngáahn
- Jyutping: lung^{4}-ngaan^{5}
- IPA: [lʊŋ˩.ŋan˩˧]
Southern Min
- Hokkien POJ: lêng-géng
- Tâi-lô: lîng-gíng

== Etymology ==
The word Longan is derived from simplified Chinese: 龙眼; traditional Chinese: 龍眼; pinyin: lóngyǎn; Cantonese Yale: lung4 ngaan5. The character 龙 means "dragon" while 眼 means "eye", so together 龙眼 literally means "dragon eye". It is named this way as the black seed within the fruit is said to resemble the eyeball of a Loong. In Vietnamese, it is often called nhãn, which is a Sino-Vietnamese word derived from the Chinese character 眼 (“eye”), but typically dropping the Loong ("dragon") part in everyday usage.

== Description ==
Depending upon climate and soil type the tree may grow to over 30 metres (100 ft) in height, but it typically stands 9–12 m (30–40 ft) in height and the crown is round. The trunk is 80 cm (2 1/2 ft) thick with corky bark. The branches are long and thick, typically drooping.

The leaves are oblong and blunt-tipped, usually 10–20 centimetres (4–8 in) long and 5 cm (2 in) wide. The leaves are pinnately compounded and alternate. There are 6 to 9 pairs of leaflets per leaf and the upper surface is wavy and a dark, glossy-green.

The longan tree produces light-yellow inflorescences at the end of branches. The inflorescence is commonly called a panicle; they can be 10–46 cm (4–18 in) long, and widely branched. The small flowers have 5 to 6 sepals and brownish-yellow petals. The flower has a two-lobed pistil and 8 stamen. There are three flower types, distributed throughout the panicle; staminate (functionally male), pistillate (functionally female), and hermaphroditic flowers. Flowering occurs as a progression.

The fruit are spherical and about 2.5 cm (1 in) wide; they hang in drooping clusters. The shell is tan, thin, and leathery with tiny hairs; when firm, it can be squeezed (as in the cracking of a sunflower seed) to shell the fruit. The flesh is translucent, and the seed is large and black with a circular white spot at the base. This gives the illusion of an eye. The flesh has a musky, sweet taste, which can be compared to the flavor of lychee fruit. The seed is round, hard, and has a lacquered appearance.

The longan tree is somewhat sensitive to frost. While the species prefers temperatures that do not typically fall below 4.5 °C (40 °F), it can withstand brief temperature drops to about −2 °C (28 °F). Longan trees prefer sandy soil with mild levels of acidity and organic matter. Longans usually bear fruit slightly later than lychees.

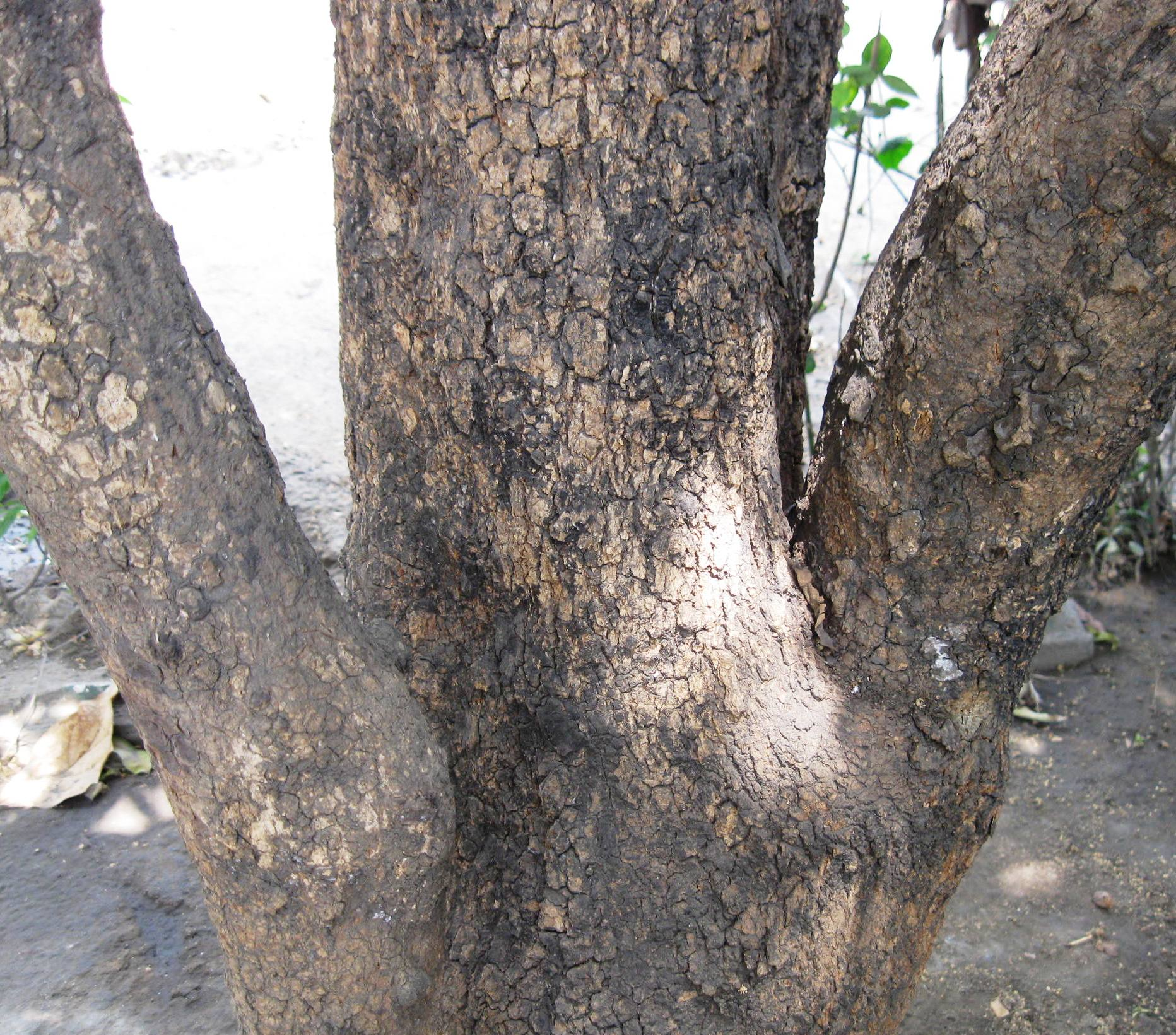
Lower trunk

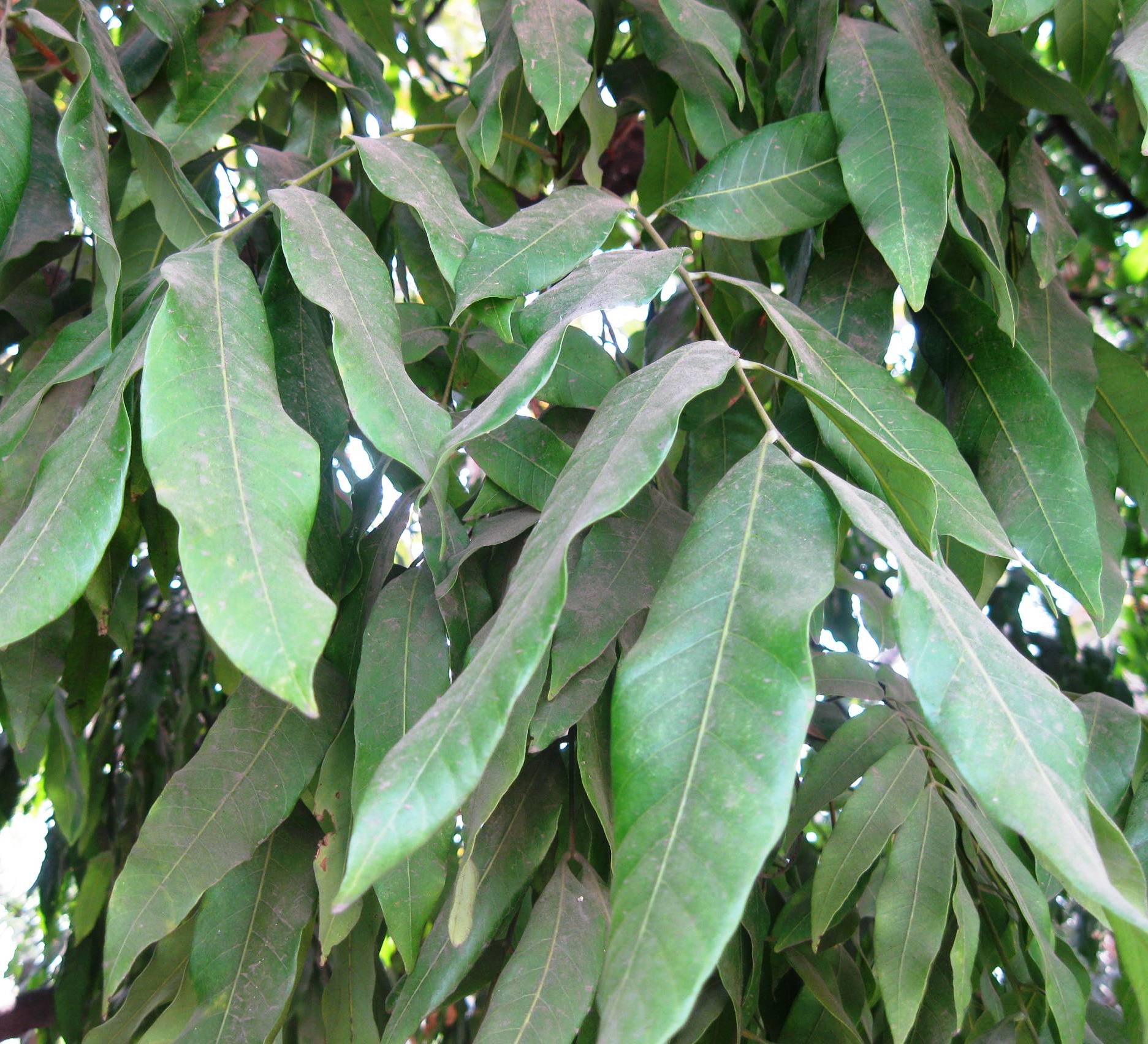
Tree leaves

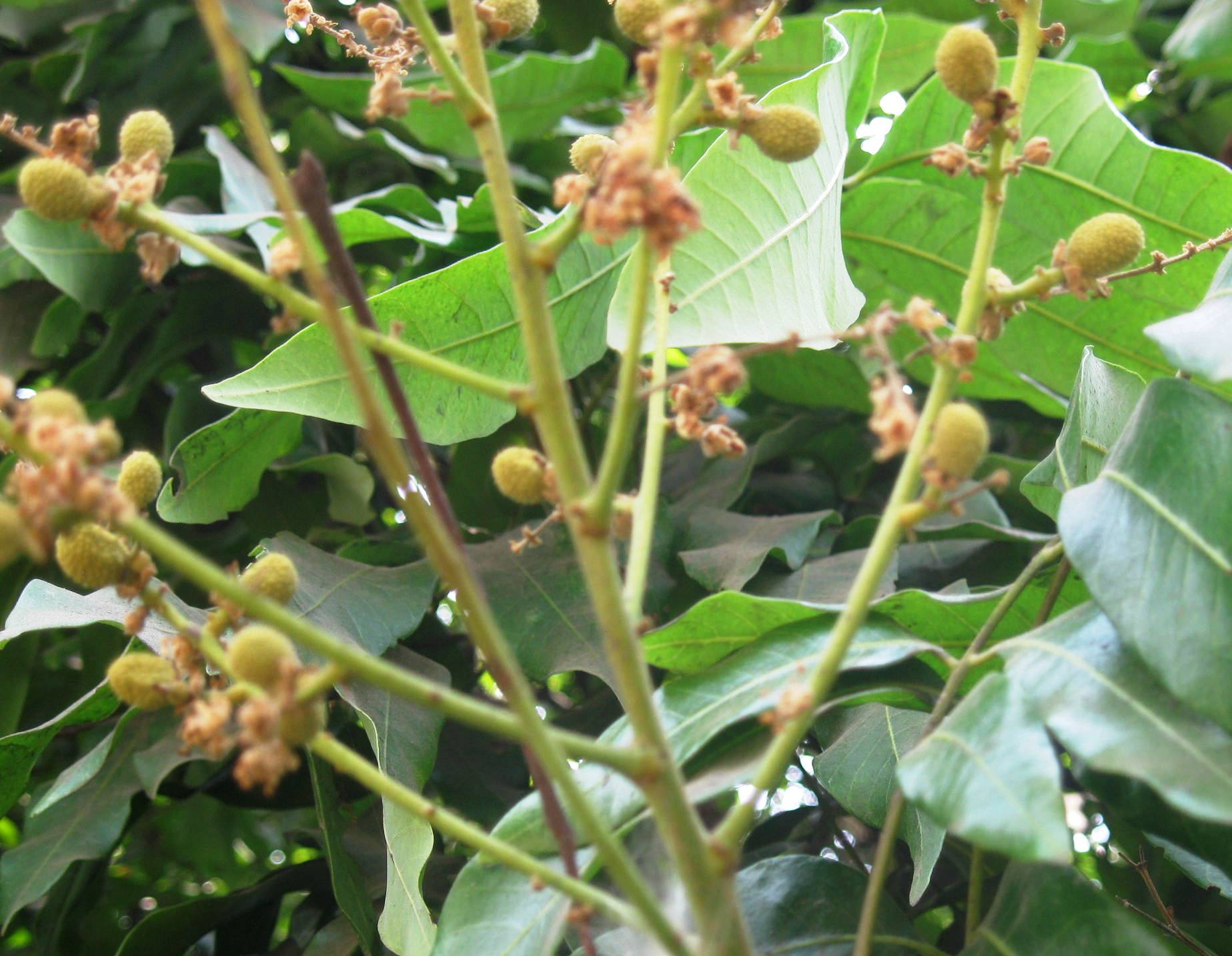
Branch of baby fruits

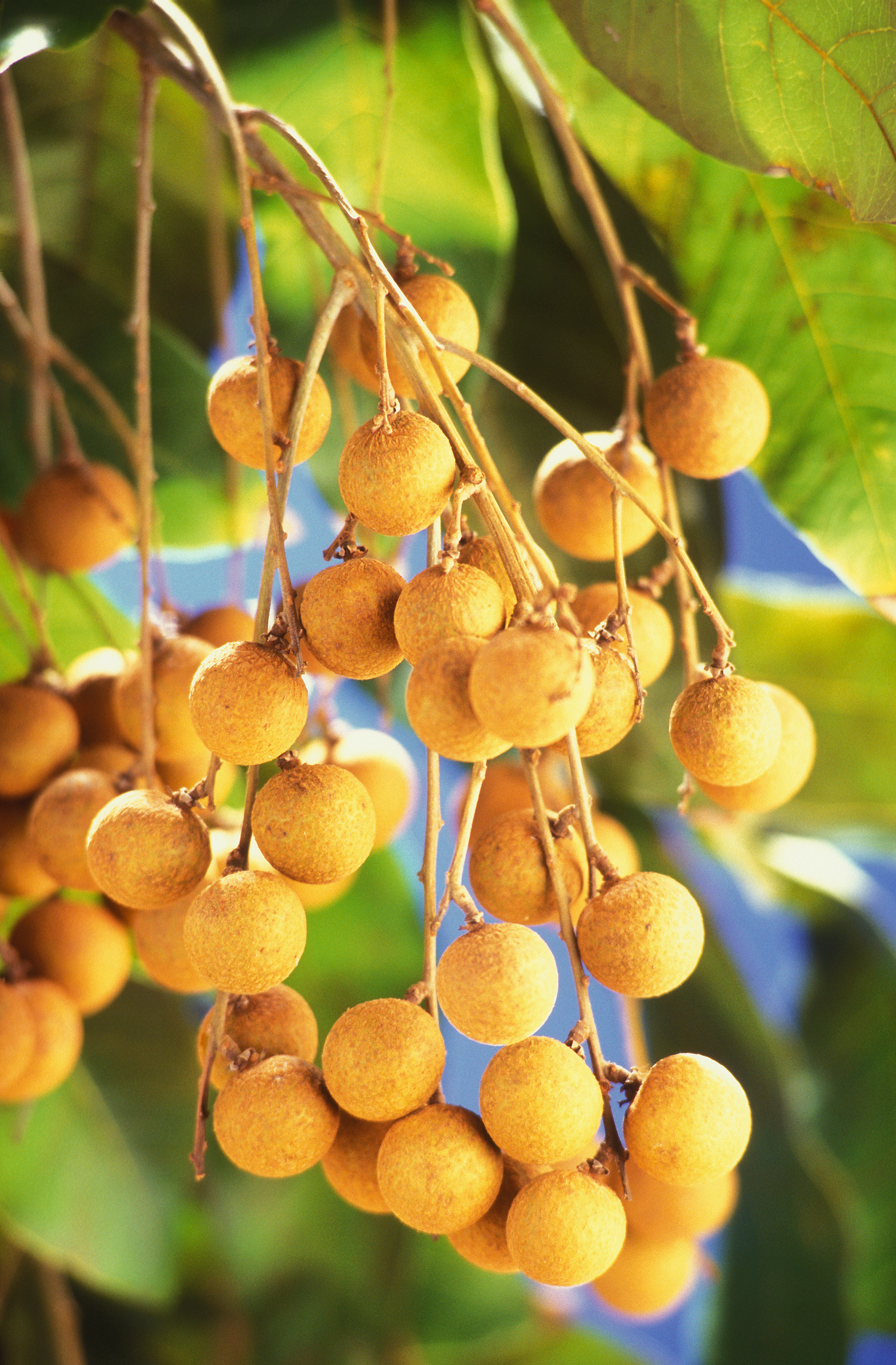
Bunch of fruit

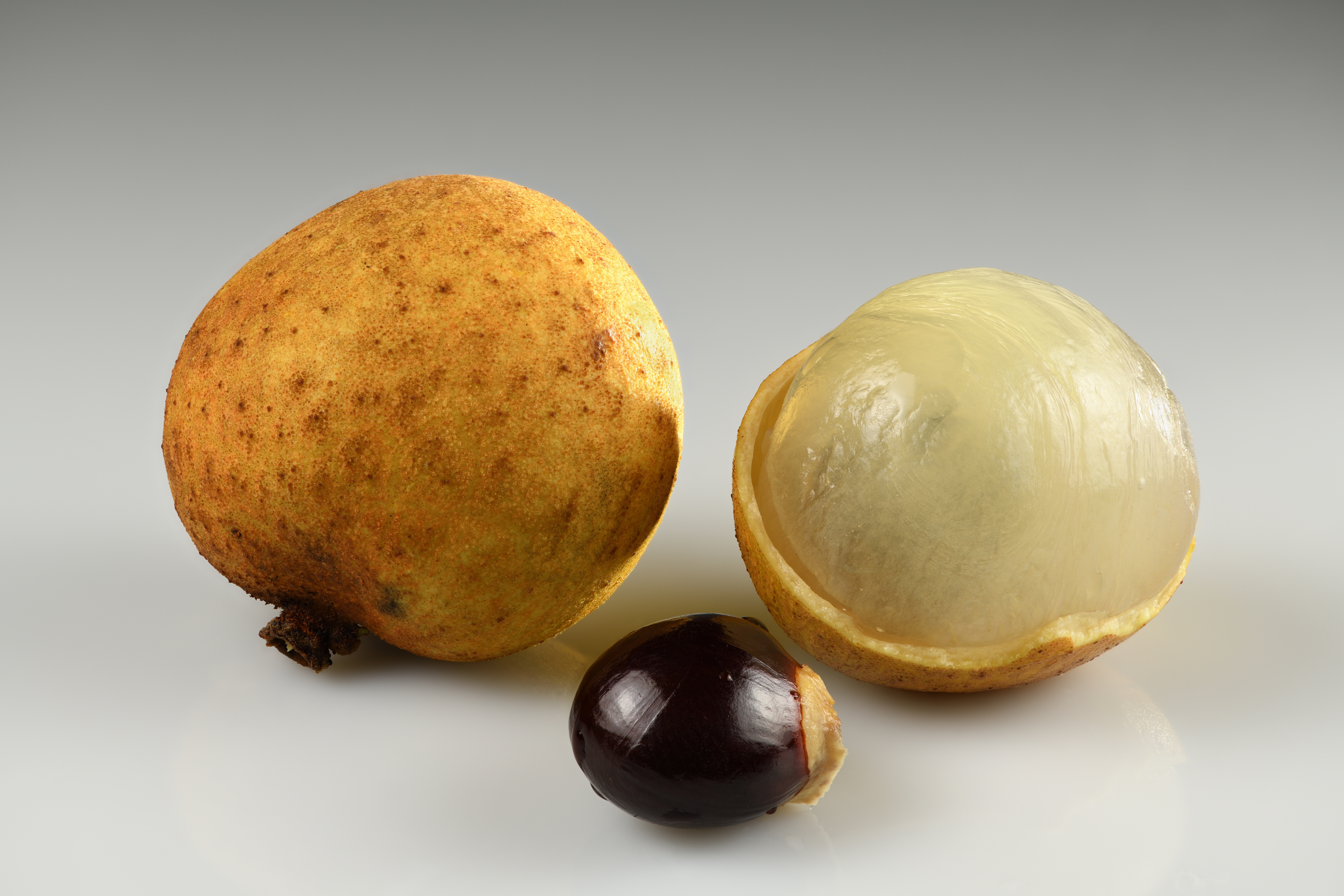
Fruits with seed

Longan being peeled and eaten

== Taxonomy and history ==
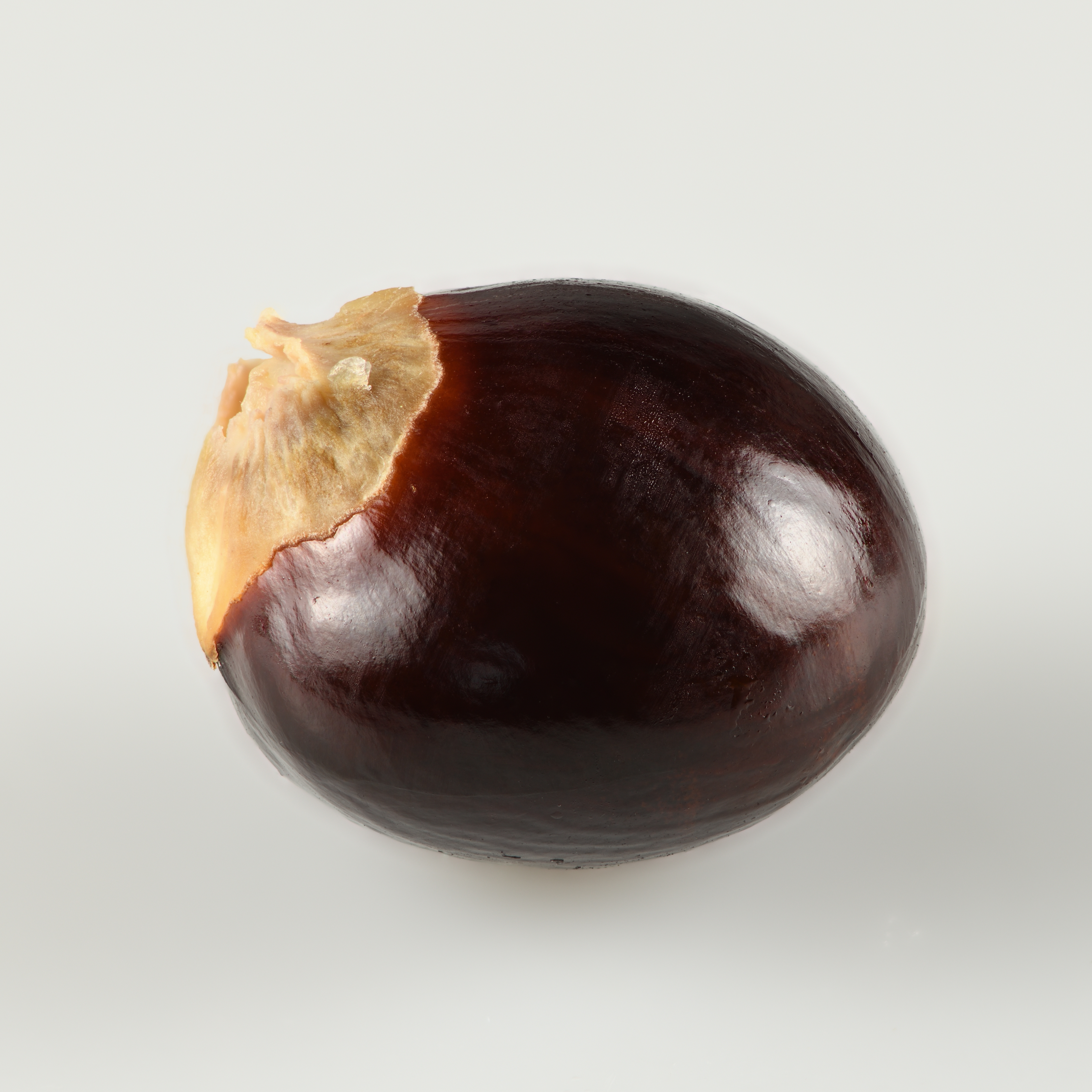
Seed

The longan is believed to be native to the mountain range between Myanmar and southern China. Other reported origins include Indonesia, India, Sri Lanka, upper Myanmar, north Thailand, Kampuchea (more commonly known as Cambodia), north Vietnam and New Guinea.

Earliest known historical records traces back to China in the Han dynasty (206 BCE–220 CE). The emperor had demanded lychee and longan trees to be planted in his palace gardens in Shaanxi outside their native range, but the plants failed. More sustained and verifiable cultivation developed four hundred years later, particularly in the southern provinces such as Fujian and Guangdong. During this period, growers gradually selected superior fruit-bearing varieties, leading to improved fruit quality and an industry of longan production.

Despite its long success in China, the longan is considered to be a relatively new fruit to the world. It has only been acknowledged outside of China in the last 250 years. Starting in the 18th century, the longan (Dimocarpus longan) spread beyond its native southern China and Southeast Asia through trade networks and botanical exchanges. The first European acknowledgment of the fruit was recorded by João de Loureiro, a Portuguese Jesuit botanist, in 1790, who first described it as Dimocarpus longan. This first entry resides in his collection of works, Flora Cochinchinensis.

Later on, due to immigration and the growing demand for nostalgic foods, the longan tree was officially introduced to north Queensland, Australia in the mid-1800s by Chinese miners, Thailand in the late-1800s, and Hawaii and Florida in the 1900s. The warm, sandy-soiled conditions allowed for the easy growth of longan trees. This jump-started the longan industry in these locations.

=== Subspecies ===
Plants of the World Online lists:

- D. longan var. echinatus Leenhouts (Borneo, Philippines)
- D. longan var. longetiolatus Leenhouts (Viet Nam)
- D. longan subsp. malesianus Leenh. (widespread SE Asia)
- D. longan var. obtusus (Pierre) Leenh. (Indo-China)

== Conservation ==
The wild longan population have been decimated considerably by large-scale logging in the past, and the species used to be listed as vulnerable on the IUCN Red List. If left alone, longan tree stumps will resprout and the listing was upgraded to near threatened in 1998. Recent field data are inadequate for a contemporary IUCN assessment.

== Diseases ==
Plant based diseases can affect both longan fruits and their trees, and the severity of these diseases can range from harmless cosmetic damage to rendering to the fruit inedible.

The most prevalent disease among longan plants is witch's broom, which can be found in all major longan-producing Asian territories, including China, Thailand, and Vietnam. Witch's broom deforms longan skin, and at times causes the plant to prematurely drop its fruit, similar to the Phytophthora palmivora.

Another common disease that longan trees can carry is the aptly named longan decline, which is largely prevalent in Thailand, with reports finding that it could affect up to 40% of longan trees alone. Affected trees are more vulnerable to common tree pests and algae, and often bear low-quality fruit unworthy of yield.

Algal spot is another plant disease that can affect longan plants and trees. Common among tropical fruits, the disease mainly takes form as red-orange algae that can appear on a fruit-bearing tree's leaves or branches.Algal spot on longan plants, like many other tropical fruits, is caused by Cephaleuros virescens.

An oomycete disease that causes blight on leaves and foliage of a plant and affects the related lychee, Phytophthora palmivora, can also appear on both longan plants and fruit, particularly in the Thailand region. When affecting longan, it can create brown spots on the fruit in an erratic fashion, and can also cause longan to drop prematurely from the plant. Early symptoms can also include a dark necrosis on the plant itself.

Stem-end rot is a disease common amongst litchi and longan, and causes browning and rot on the stem of the fruit. Longan also suffer from various decay-accelerating fungi.

An oomycete disease that affects the related lychee, Phytophthora litchii, also afflicts D. longan.

== Cultivation ==
Currently, longan crops are grown in southern China, Taiwan, northern Thailand, Malaysia, Indonesia, Cambodia, Laos, Vietnam, India, Sri Lanka, the Philippines, Bangladesh, Mauritius, the United States, and Australia.

=== Growth ===
Longan, like its sister fruit lychee, thrives in humid areas or places with high rainfall, and can grow on most types of soil that does not induce issues with water drainage. Ample temperatures are also instrumental in longan growth: while longan can resist small stretches of cool temperatures, they can be damaged or killed in longer stretches of temperatures as high as −2 degrees Celsius. Younger plants tend to be more vulnerable to the cold than those more mature.

Longans, raw
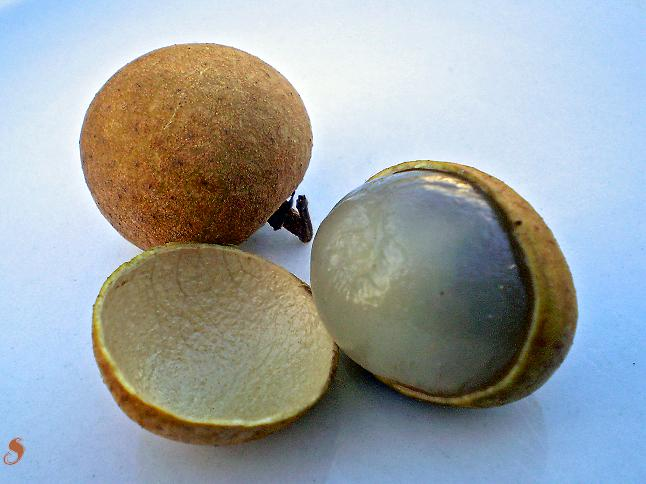
- A peeled longan fruit

Nutritional value per 100 g (3.5 oz)
- Energy: 251 kJ (60 kcal)
- Carbohydrates: 15.14 g
- Sugars: n/a
- Dietary fiber: 1.1 g
- Fat: 0.1 g
- Protein: 1.31 g
Amino acids
Threonine	0.034 g
Isoleucine	0.026 g
Leucine	0.054 g
Lysine	0.046 g
Methionine	0.013 g
Phenylalanine	0.030 g
Tyrosine	0.025 g
Valine	0.058 g
Arginine	0.035 g
Histidine	0.012 g
Alanine	0.157 g
Aspartic acid	0.126 g
Glutamic acid	0.209 g
Glycine	0.042 g
Proline	0.042 g
Serine	0.048 g
Vitamins and minerals
Vitamins	Quantity %DV^{†}
Thiamine (B1)	3% 0.031 mg
Riboflavin (B2)	11% 0.14 mg
Niacin (B3)	2% 0.3 mg
Vitamin C	93% 84 mg
Minerals	Quantity %DV^{†}
Calcium	0% 1 mg
Iron	1% 0.13 mg
Magnesium	2% 10 mg
Manganese	2% 0.052 mg
Phosphorus	2% 21 mg
Potassium	9% 266 mg
Sodium	0% 0 mg
Zinc	0% 0.05 mg
- Other constituents: Quantity
- Water: 83 g
- Link to USDA Database entry
- ^{†}Percentages estimated using US recommendations for adults, except for potassium, which is estimated based on expert recommendation from the National Academies.

=== Harvest ===
During harvest, pickers must climb ladders to carefully remove branches of fruit from longan trees. Longan fruit remain fresher if still attached to the branch, so efforts are made to prevent the fruit from detaching too early. Mechanical picking would damage the delicate skin of the fruit, so the preferred method is to harvest by hand. Knives and scissors are the most commonly used tools.

Fruit is picked early in the day to minimize water loss and to prevent high heat exposure, which would be damaging. The fruit is then placed into either plastic crates or bamboo baskets and taken to packaging houses, where the fruit undergo a series of checks for quality. The packaging houses are well-ventilated and shaded to prevent further decay. The process of checking and sorting are performed by workers instead of machinery. Any fruit that is split, under-ripe, or decaying is disposed of. The remaining healthy fruit is then prepared and shipped to markets.

Many companies add preservatives to canned longan. Regulations control the preserving process. The only known preservative added to canned longan is sulfur dioxide, to prevent discoloration. Fresh longan that is shipped worldwide is exposed to sulfur fumigation. Tests have shown that sulfur residues remain on the fruit skin, branches, and leaves for a few weeks. This violates many countries' limits on fumigation residue, and efforts have been made to reduce this amount.

=== Distribution ===
Longan is found commonly in most of Asia, primarily in mainland China, Taiwan, Vietnam and Thailand. China, the main longan-producing country in the world, produced about 1.9 million metric tons (2.1 million short tons) of longan in 2015–2017, accounting for 70% of the world's longan production and more than 50% of the world's longan plots. Vietnam and Thailand produced around 500 and 980 thousand metric tons (550 and 1,080 thousand short tons), respectively. Like Vietnam, Thailand's economy relies heavily on the cultivation and shipments of longan as well as lychee. This increase in the production of longan reflects recent interest in exotic fruits in other parts of the world. However, the majority of the demand comes from Asian communities in North America, Europe and Australia.

=== Yield ===
While longan yields average out to 2 to 5 tonnes per hectare, there have been observed yields of up to 19.5 tonnes per ha in Israel.

Advancements in selective breeding have allowed scientists to find a strain of longan containing a "high proportion of aborted seeds" at the end of a thirty-year breeding program in 2001. Studies in 2015 that aimed to aid longan breeding efforts discovered that −20 degrees Celsius is the optimal temperature for long-term storage of longan pollen, a key ingredient in enabling longan breeding programs.

== Uses ==
=== Nutrition ===
Raw longan fruit is 83% water, 15% carbohydrates, 1% protein, and contains negligible fat (table). In a 100 g (3.5 oz) reference amount, raw longan supplies 60 calories of food energy, 93% of the Daily Value (DV) of vitamin C, 11% DV of riboflavin, and no other micronutrients in appreciable quantities (table).

=== Culinary ===
The fruit is sweet, juicy, and succulent in superior agricultural varieties. The seed and the peel are not consumed. Apart from being eaten raw like other fruits, longan fruit is also often used in Asian soups, snacks, desserts, and sweet-and-sour foods, either fresh or dried, and sometimes preserved and canned in syrup. The taste is different from lychees; while longan has a drier sweetness similar to dates, lychees are often messily juicy with a more tropical, grape-like sour sweetness.

Dried longan are often used in Chinese cuisine and Chinese sweet dessert soups. In Chinese food therapy and herbal medicine, it is believed to have an effect on relaxation. In contrast with the fresh fruit, which is juicy and white, the flesh of dried longans is dark brown to almost black.

Once fermented, it can be made into longan wine.

== See also ==
- Lansium domesticum, the langsat or lanzones
- Talisia esculenta, a visually similar fruit from South America
