= Olceclostera meldola =

Scientific classification
- Kingdom: Animalia
- Phylum: Arthropoda
- Clade: Pancrustacea
- Class: Insecta
- Order: Lepidoptera
- Family: Apatelodidae
- Genus: Olceclostera
- Species: O. meldola

Binomial name
- Olceclostera meldola (Schaus, 1900)

Synonyms
- Thelosiam eldola Schaus, 1900

Species of moth

Olceclostera meldola is a species of moth in the family Apatelodidae. It was first described by William Schaus in 1900 and is found in Brazil (Parana).
