= Apatelodes erotina =

Scientific classification
- Kingdom: Animalia
- Phylum: Arthropoda
- Class: Insecta
- Order: Lepidoptera
- Family: Apatelodidae
- Genus: Apatelodes
- Species: A. erotina

Binomial name
- Apatelodes erotina Schaus, 1939

Species of moth

Apatelodes erotina is a moth in the family Apatelodidae. It is found in Costa Rica.
