= Tupac concerpta =

Scientific classification
- Kingdom: Animalia
- Phylum: Arthropoda
- Clade: Pancrustacea
- Class: Insecta
- Order: Lepidoptera
- Family: Apatelodidae
- Genus: Tupac
- Species: T. concerpta

Binomial name
- Tupac concerpta Draudt, 1929

Synonyms
- Apatelodes concerpta Draudt, 1929

Species of moth

Tupac concerpta is a species of moth in the family Apatelodidae. It is found in Minas Gerais, Brazil.
