= Carnotena truncata =

Scientific classification
- Kingdom: Animalia
- Phylum: Arthropoda
- Clade: Pancrustacea
- Class: Insecta
- Order: Lepidoptera
- Family: Apatelodidae
- Genus: Thelosia
- Species: T. truncata

Binomial name
- Thelosia truncata (Schaus, 1894)

Synonyms
- Trabala truncata Schaus, 1894; Thelosia truncata (Schaus, 1894); Thelosia truncata f. rectilinea Dognin, 1922

Species of moth

Carnotena truncata is a species of moth in the family Apatelodidae. It was first described by William Schaus in 1894 as Trabala(?) truncata and is found in Brazil (Parana).
