= Tupac bombycina =

Scientific classification
- Kingdom: Animalia
- Phylum: Arthropoda
- Clade: Pancrustacea
- Class: Insecta
- Order: Lepidoptera
- Family: Apatelodidae
- Genus: Tupac
- Species: T. bombycina

Binomial name
- Tupac bombycina (H. Druce, 1898)

Synonyms
- Apatelodes albipunctata Druce, 1898

Species of moth

Tupac bombycina is a species of moth in the family Apatelodidae that was first described by Herbert Druce in 1898. It is found in Mexico (Veracruz), Costa Rica, Nicaragua and Guatemala.
