= Zanola vivax =

Scientific classification
- Kingdom: Animalia
- Phylum: Arthropoda
- Clade: Pancrustacea
- Class: Insecta
- Order: Lepidoptera
- Family: Apatelodidae
- Genus: Zanola
- Species: Z. vivax

Binomial name
- Zanola vivax (H. Edwards, 1884)

Synonyms
- Apatelodes vivax H. Edwards, 1884

Species of moth

Zanola vivax is a species of moth in the family Apatelodidae. It was first described by Henry Edwards in 1884 and is found in Mexico.
