= Drepatelodes trilineata =

Scientific classification
- Domain: Eukaryota
- Kingdom: Animalia
- Phylum: Arthropoda
- Class: Insecta
- Order: Lepidoptera
- Family: Apatelodidae
- Genus: Drepatelodes
- Species: D. trilineata

Binomial name
- Drepatelodes trilineata (Dognin, 1912)

Species of moth

Drepatelodes trilineata is a moth in the Apatelodidae family. It was described by Paul Dognin in 1912.
