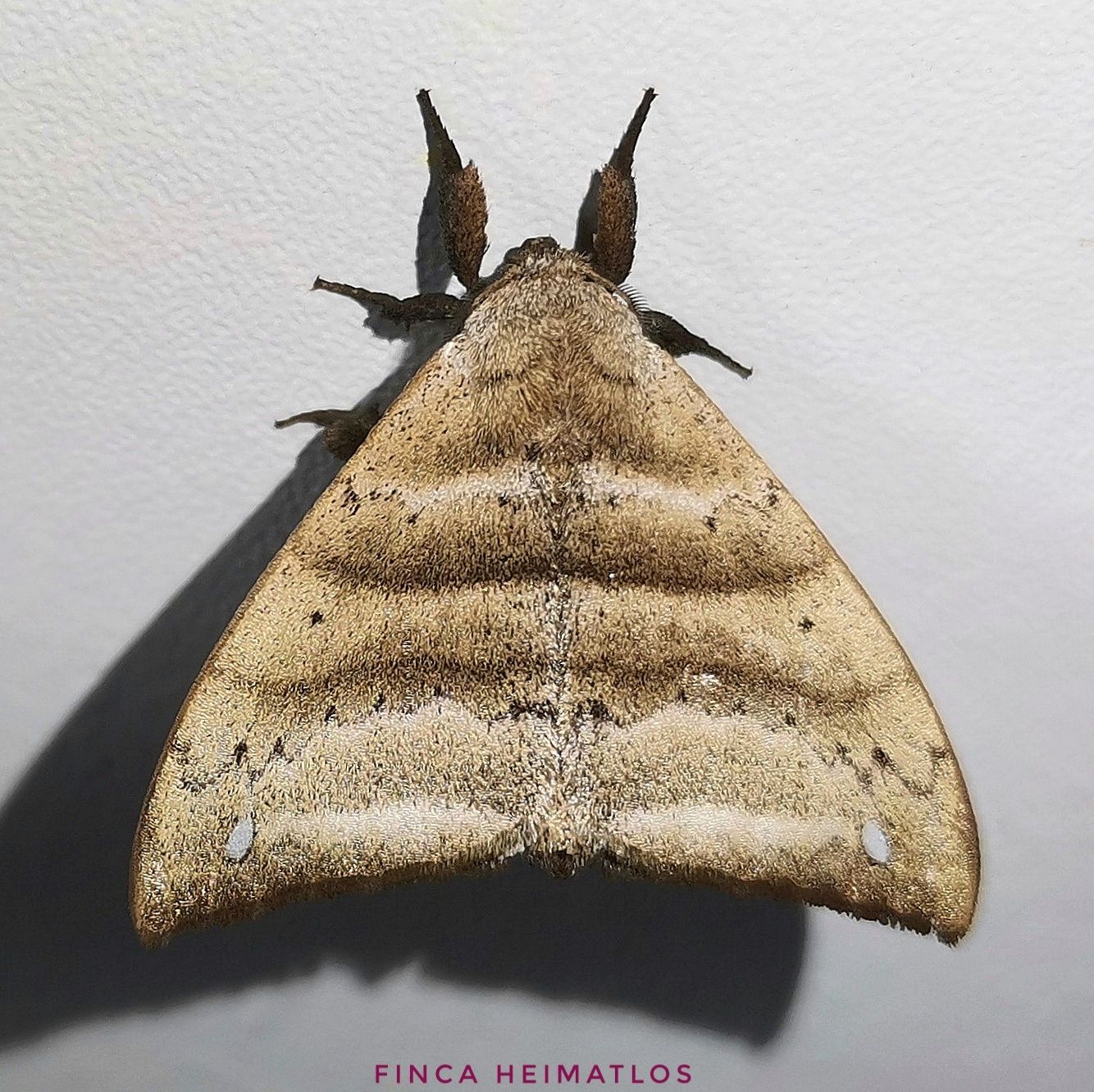
- In Ecuador

Scientific classification
- Kingdom: Animalia
- Phylum: Arthropoda
- Clade: Pancrustacea
- Class: Insecta
- Order: Lepidoptera
- Family: Apatelodidae
- Genus: Falcatelodes
- Species: F. anava

Binomial name
- Falcatelodes anava (H. Druce, 1890)

Synonyms
- Apatelodes anava H. Druce, 1890; Falcatelodes laffonti Dognin

= Falcatelodes anava =

Genus of moths

Falcatelodes anava is a species of moth in the family Apatelodidae. It was first described by Herbert Druce in 1890 as Apatelodes anava. It is found in Ecuador.
