= Apatelodes datanoides =

Scientific classification
- Kingdom: Animalia
- Phylum: Arthropoda
- Class: Insecta
- Order: Lepidoptera
- Family: Apatelodidae
- Genus: Apatelodes
- Species: A. datanoides

Binomial name
- Apatelodes datanoides Draudt, 1929

Synonyms
- Hygrochroa datanoides

Species of moth

Apatelodes datanoides is a moth in the family Apatelodidae.
