= Apatelodes striata =

Scientific classification
- Kingdom: Animalia
- Phylum: Arthropoda
- Class: Insecta
- Order: Lepidoptera
- Family: Apatelodidae
- Genus: Apatelodes
- Species: A. striata

Binomial name
- Apatelodes striata H. Druce, 1906

Species of moth

Apatelodes striata is a moth in the family Apatelodidae. It was first described by Herbert Druce in 1906. It is found in Peru.

The forewings are fawn, with six angular lines near the apex and a white spot at the apex. There is a black dot on the inner margin close to the base. The hindwings are brownish fawn, with paler veins.
