= Drepatelodes friburgensis =

Scientific classification
- Domain: Eukaryota
- Kingdom: Animalia
- Phylum: Arthropoda
- Class: Insecta
- Order: Lepidoptera
- Family: Apatelodidae
- Genus: Drepatelodes
- Species: D. friburgensis

Binomial name
- Drepatelodes friburgensis (Schaus, 1924)

Species of moth

Drepatelodes friburgensis is a moth in the family Apatelodidae. It was described by Schaus in 1924.
