= Drepatelodes quadrilineata =

Scientific classification
- Domain: Eukaryota
- Kingdom: Animalia
- Phylum: Arthropoda
- Class: Insecta
- Order: Lepidoptera
- Family: Apatelodidae
- Genus: Drepatelodes
- Species: D. quadrilineata

Binomial name
- Drepatelodes quadrilineata (Schaus, 1920)

Species of moth

Drepatelodes quadrilineata is a moth in the Apatelodidae family. It was described by Schaus in 1920.
