= Ephoria (moth) =

Scientific classification
- Kingdom: Animalia
- Phylum: Arthropoda
- Clade: Pancrustacea
- Class: Insecta
- Order: Lepidoptera
- Family: Apatelodidae
- Genus: Ephoria; Herrich-Schäffer, 1855

Synonyms
- Colabata Walker, 1856

Genus of moths

Ephoria is a genus of moths of the family Apatelodidae. It was previously known as Colabata, as a result of Herrich-Schäffer's Synopsis familiarum Lepidopterorum—in which Ephoria was introduced—having been published twice. The earlier of these publications precedes that of Walker's Colabata in 1856, making the latter the junior synonym.

== Species ==
The following species are recognised in the genus Ephoria:

- Ephoria dora (Schaus, 1896)
- Ephoria ephora (Stoll, 1781)
- Ephoria lybia (Druce, 1898)
- Ephoria marginalis (Walker, 1856)
- Ephoria mendozata (Dognin, 1923)
- Ephoria nubilosa (Dognin, 1924)
- Ephoria thea (Schaus, 1924)
- Ephoria yanisi Herbin & Mielke, 2018
