= Kaweskar cirna =

Scientific classification
- Kingdom: Animalia
- Phylum: Arthropoda
- Clade: Pancrustacea
- Class: Insecta
- Order: Lepidoptera
- Family: Apatelodidae
- Genus: Kaweskar
- Species: K. cirna

Binomial name
- Kaweskar cirna (H. Druce, 1897)

Synonyms
- Apatelodes cirna H. Druce, 1897

Species of moth

Kaweskar cirna is a species of moth in the family Apatelodidae. It is found in Veracruz, Mexico.
