= Tibira eadgara =

Scientific classification
- Kingdom: Animalia
- Phylum: Arthropoda
- Clade: Pancrustacea
- Class: Insecta
- Order: Lepidoptera
- Family: Apatelodidae
- Genus: Tibira
- Species: T. eadgara

Binomial name
- Tibira eadgara (Schaus, 1934)

Synonyms
- Colabata eadgara Schaus, 1934; Ephoria eadgara (Schaus, 1934)

Species of moth

Tibira eadgara is a species of moth in the family Apatelodidae. It was first described by William Schaus in 1934 and is found in Brazil.

== Taxonomy ==
Tibira eadgara was originally described as Colabata eadgara.
