= Carnotena minois =

Scientific classification
- Kingdom: Animalia
- Phylum: Arthropoda
- Clade: Pancrustacea
- Class: Insecta
- Order: Lepidoptera
- Family: Apatelodidae
- Genus: Carnotena
- Species: C. minois

Binomial name
- Carnotena minois (Schaus, 1892)

Synonyms
- Tarchon minois Schaus, 1892; Thelosia minois (Schaus, 1892)

Species of moth

Carnotena minois is a species of moth in the family Apatelodidae. It was first described by William Schaus in 1892 and is found in Brazil (Rio de Janeiro).
