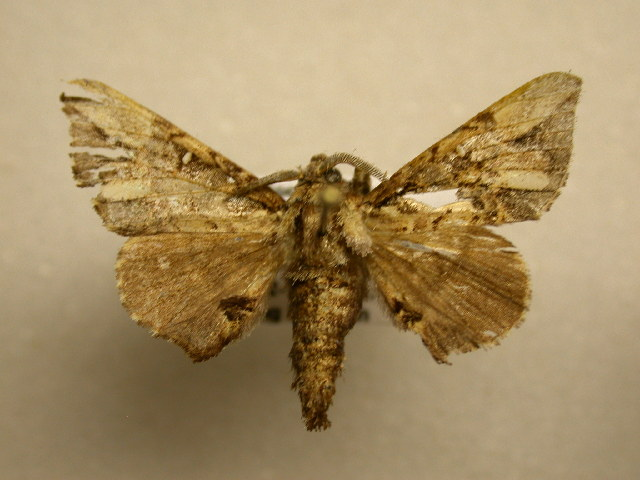

Scientific classification
- Kingdom: Animalia
- Phylum: Arthropoda
- Clade: Pancrustacea
- Class: Insecta
- Order: Lepidoptera
- Family: Apatelodidae
- Genus: Tamphana
- Species: T. marmorea

Binomial name
- Tamphana marmorea Schaus, 1892

= Tamphana marmorea =

Species of moth

Tamphana marmorea is a moth in the Bombycidae family. It was described by Schaus in 1892. It is found in Costa Rica and Brazil.
