= Ephoria lybia =

Scientific classification
- Domain: Eukaryota
- Kingdom: Animalia
- Phylum: Arthropoda
- Class: Insecta
- Order: Lepidoptera
- Family: Apatelodidae
- Genus: Ephoria
- Species: E. lybia

Binomial name
- Ephoria lybia (H. Druce, 1898)

Synonyms
- Colabata lybia f. hoppi Draudt, 1929; Colabata lybia f. nubilosa Dognin, 1924; Colabata lybia

Species of moth

Ephoria lybia is a moth in the family Apatelodidae. It was described by Herbert Druce in 1898.
