= Apatelodes pervicax =

Scientific classification
- Kingdom: Animalia
- Phylum: Arthropoda
- Class: Insecta
- Order: Lepidoptera
- Family: Apatelodidae
- Genus: Apatelodes
- Species: A. pervicax

Binomial name
- Apatelodes pervicax Dognin, 1911

Synonyms
- Hygrochroa pervicax

Species of moth

Apatelodes pervicax is a moth in the family Apatelodidae.
