= Crastolliana damora =

Scientific classification
- Kingdom: Animalia
- Phylum: Arthropoda
- Clade: Pancrustacea
- Class: Insecta
- Order: Lepidoptera
- Family: Apatelodidae
- Genus: Crastolliana
- Species: C. damora

Binomial name
- Crastolliana damora (Schaus, 1939)

Synonyms
- Apatelodes damora Schaus, 1939; Hygrochroa damora (Schaus, 1939)

Species of moth

Crastolliana damora is a species of moth in the family Apatelodidae. It is found in Brazil.
