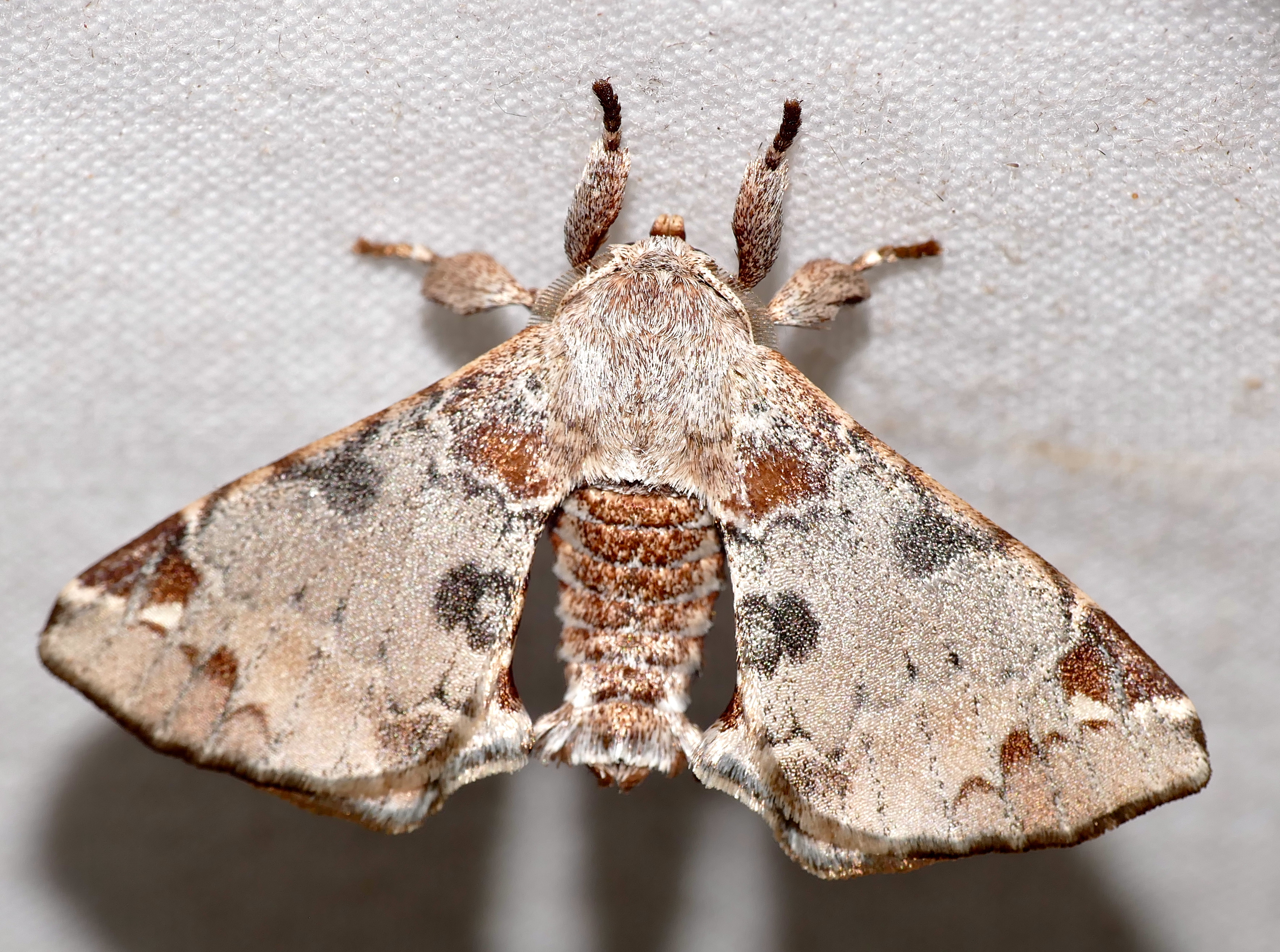

Scientific classification
- Kingdom: Animalia
- Phylum: Arthropoda
- Clade: Pancrustacea
- Class: Insecta
- Order: Lepidoptera
- Family: Apatelodidae
- Genus: Crastolliana
- Species: C. nina

Binomial name
- Crastolliana nina (Stoll, 1780)

Synonyms
- Hygrochroa nina Stoll, 1780; Phalaena nina Stoll, [1780]; Apatelodes nina

= Crastolliana nina =

Species of moth

Crastolliana nina is a species of moth in the family Apatelodidae. It is found in French Guiana, Suriname, Guyana, Trinidad, and at low elevation on oriental side of the Andes in Colombia and Peru.

== Host plant ==
- Aparisthmium cordatum (A. Juss.) Baill., 1865 (Euphorbiaceae)
