= Apatelodes parvula =

Scientific classification
- Kingdom: Animalia
- Phylum: Arthropoda
- Class: Insecta
- Order: Lepidoptera
- Family: Apatelodidae
- Genus: Apatelodes
- Species: A. parvula

Binomial name
- Apatelodes parvula Schaus, 1894

Species of moth

Apatelodes parvula is a moth in the family Apatelodidae. It is found in Brazil (Parana).
