= Tupac castanea =

Scientific classification
- Kingdom: Animalia
- Phylum: Arthropoda
- Clade: Pancrustacea
- Class: Insecta
- Order: Lepidoptera
- Family: Apatelodidae
- Genus: Tupac
- Species: T. castanea

Binomial name
- Tupac castanea (E. D. Jones, 1908)

Synonyms
- Apatelodes castanea E. D. Jones, 1908

Species of moth

Tupac castanea is a species of moth in the family Apatelodidae that was first described by E. Dukinfield Jones in 1908. It is found in Paraná, Brazil.

== Description ==
The wingspan is about 40 mm. The forewings are chestnut brown with conspicuous dark slightly excurved ante- and post-medial lines. There is a minute white spot near the apex and a minute dark point on the discocellulars. The hindwings are chestnut-brown, but ochreous at the base.
