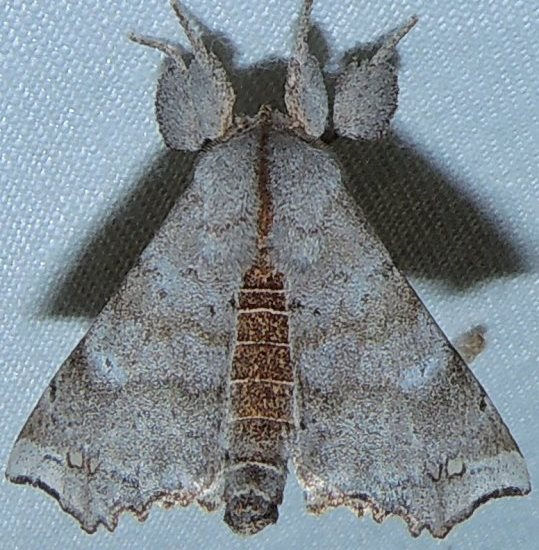

Scientific classification
- Kingdom: Animalia
- Phylum: Arthropoda
- Clade: Pancrustacea
- Class: Insecta
- Order: Lepidoptera
- Family: Apatelodidae
- Genus: Olceclostera
- Species: O. angelica

Binomial name
- Olceclostera angelica (Grote, 1864)

Synonyms
- Parathyris angelica Grote, 1864; Apatelodes hyalinopuncta Packard, 1864

= Olceclostera angelica =

Species of moth

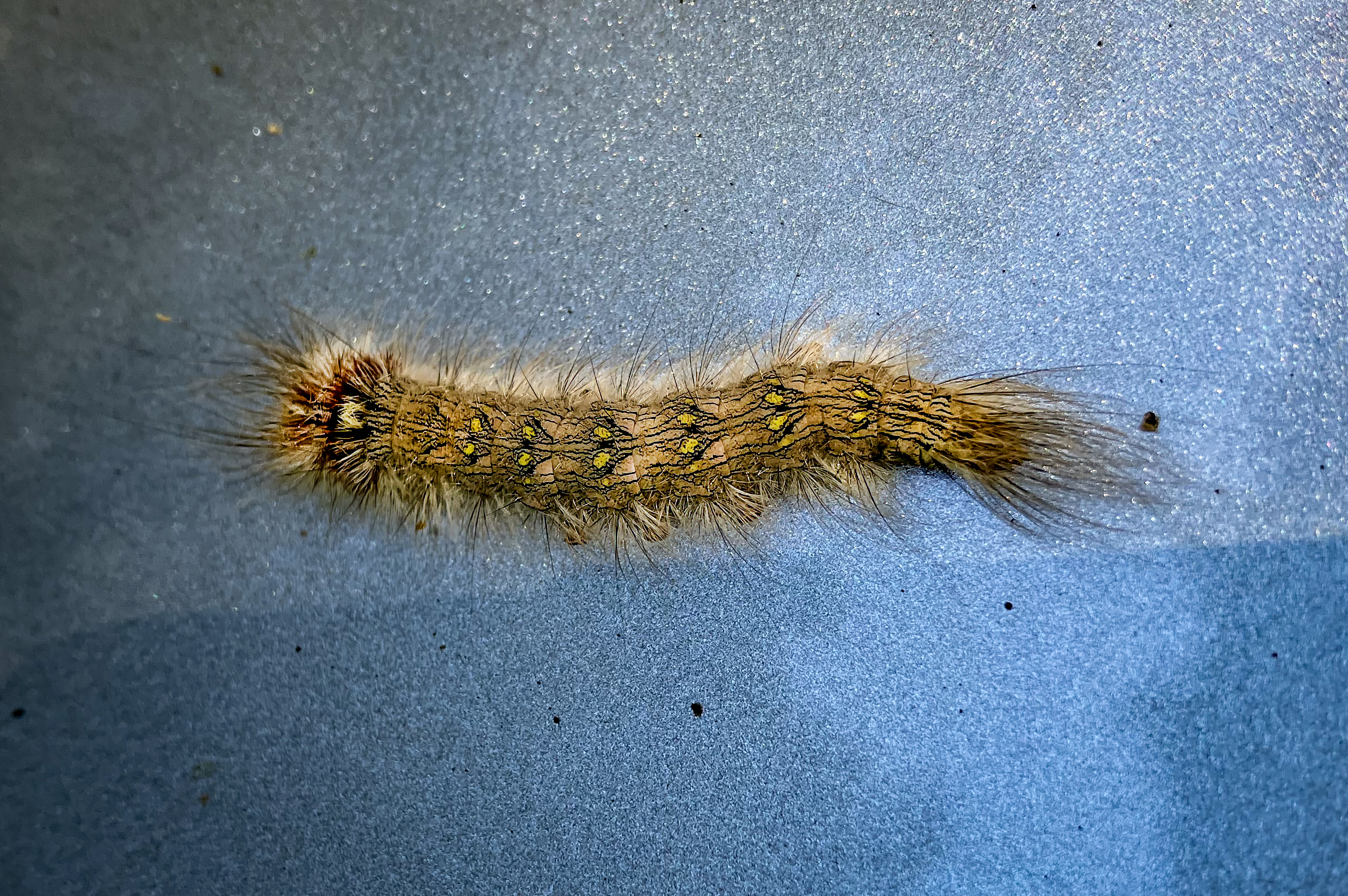
Caterpillar

Olceclostera angelica, the angel moth, is a moth in the family Apatelodidae. The species was first described by Augustus Radcliffe Grote in 1864. It is found in North America, where it has been recorded from Quebec and Maine to Florida, west to Texas and north to Wisconsin and Ontario. The habitat consists of deciduous forests.

The wingspan is 32–42 mm (1.3–1.7 in). Adults are on wing from May to September.

The larvae feed on the leaves of Fraxinus and Syringa species.
