= Apatelodes pandara =

Scientific classification
- Kingdom: Animalia
- Phylum: Arthropoda
- Class: Insecta
- Order: Lepidoptera
- Family: Apatelodidae
- Genus: Apatelodes
- Species: A. pandara

Binomial name
- Apatelodes pandara H. Druce, 1898

Species of moth

Apatelodes pandara is a moth in the family Apatelodidae, first described by Herbert Druce in 1898. It is found in Costa Rica.
