= Hygrochroa =

Scientific classification
- Kingdom: Animalia
- Phylum: Arthropoda
- Clade: Pancrustacea
- Class: Insecta
- Order: Lepidoptera
- Family: Apatelodidae
- Genus: Hygrochroa; Hübner, [1823]

Genus of moths

Hygrochroa is a genus of moths in the family Apatelodidae. It was erected by Jacob Hübner in 1823. Species of the genus are found in South America.

== Species ==
Two species are recognised in the genus Hygrochroa:

- Hygrochroa firmiana (Stoll, 1782)
- Hygrochroa firmianoides (Herbin & Mielke, 2018)
