= Apatelodes paraguayana =

Scientific classification
- Kingdom: Animalia
- Phylum: Arthropoda
- Class: Insecta
- Order: Lepidoptera
- Family: Apatelodidae
- Genus: Apatelodes
- Species: A. paraguayana

Binomial name
- Apatelodes paraguayana Schaus, 1927

Synonyms
- Hygrochroa paraguayana

Species of moth

Apatelodes paraguayana is a moth in the family Apatelodidae. It is found in Paraguay.
