= Drepatelodes tanais =

Scientific classification
- Domain: Eukaryota
- Kingdom: Animalia
- Phylum: Arthropoda
- Class: Insecta
- Order: Lepidoptera
- Family: Apatelodidae
- Genus: Drepatelodes
- Species: D. tanais

Binomial name
- Drepatelodes tanais (H. Druce, 1898)

Synonyms
- Tarchon tanais H. Druce, 1898

Species of moth

Drepatelodes tanais is a moth in the family Apatelodidae. It was described by Herbert Druce in 1898. It is found in Costa Rica.
