= Apatelodes martia =

Scientific classification
- Kingdom: Animalia
- Phylum: Arthropoda
- Class: Insecta
- Order: Lepidoptera
- Family: Apatelodidae
- Genus: Apatelodes
- Species: A. martia

Binomial name
- Apatelodes martia (Stoll, 1782)

Synonyms
- Apatelodes bombycina Felder, 1874; Hygrochroa martia

Species of moth

Apatelodes martia is a moth in the family Apatelodidae. It is found in Brazil.
