= Apatelodes sericea =

Scientific classification
- Kingdom: Animalia
- Phylum: Arthropoda
- Class: Insecta
- Order: Lepidoptera
- Family: Apatelodidae
- Genus: Apatelodes
- Species: A. sericea

Binomial name
- Apatelodes sericea Schaus, 1895

Synonyms
- Apatelodes erecta Dognin, 1916

Species of moth

Apatelodes sericea is a moth in the family Apatelodidae. It is found in Brazil.
