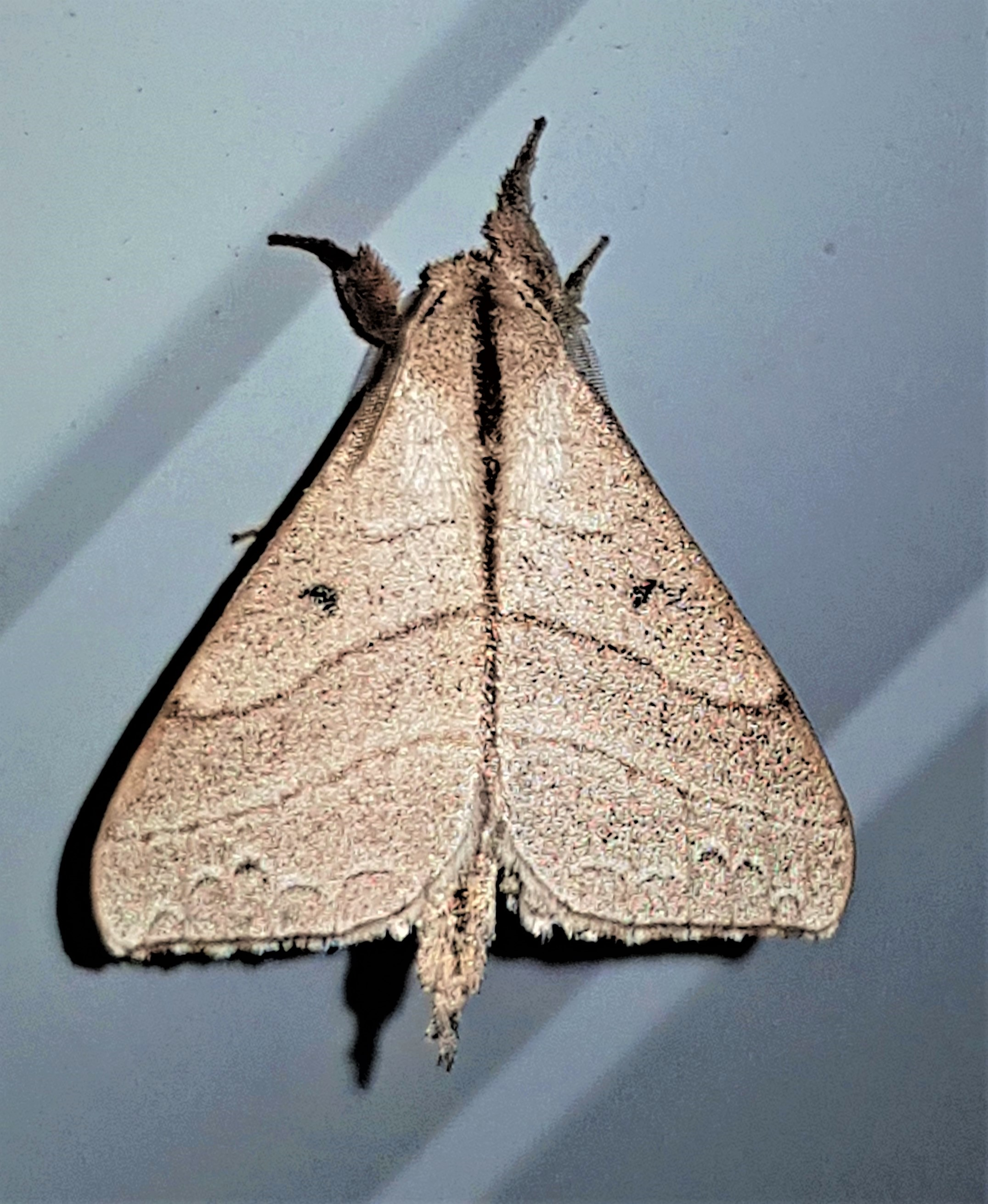

Scientific classification
- Domain: Eukaryota
- Kingdom: Animalia
- Phylum: Arthropoda
- Class: Insecta
- Order: Lepidoptera
- Family: Apatelodidae
- Genus: Drepatelodes
- Species: D. ostenta

Binomial name
- Drepatelodes ostenta (Schaus, 1905)

= Drepatelodes ostenta =

Species of moth

Drepatelodes ostenta is a moth in the Apatelodidae family. It was described by Schaus in 1905.
