= Thelosia phalaena =

Scientific classification
- Domain: Eukaryota
- Kingdom: Animalia
- Phylum: Arthropoda
- Class: Insecta
- Order: Lepidoptera
- Family: Apatelodidae
- Genus: Thelosia
- Species: T. phalaena

Binomial name
- Thelosia phalaena Schaus, 1896

Species of moth

Thelosia phalaena is a moth in the family Apatelodidae. It was described by William Schaus in 1896. It is found in Brazil (Rio de Janeiro).

The wingspan is 30–45 mm. The forewings are dark reddish brown without markings. The hindwings are speckled with chrome yellow scales.
