= Apatelodes erubescens =

Scientific classification
- Kingdom: Animalia
- Phylum: Arthropoda
- Clade: Pancrustacea
- Class: Insecta
- Order: Lepidoptera
- Family: Apatelodidae
- Genus: Apatelodes
- Species: A. erubescens

Binomial name
- Apatelodes erubescens Draudt, 1929

Species of moth

Apatelodes erubescens is a moth in the family Apatelodidae. It is found in Brazil.

The larvae feed on Byrsonima pachyphylla and Byrsonima verbascifolia.
