= Apatelodes lepida =

Scientific classification
- Kingdom: Animalia
- Phylum: Arthropoda
- Class: Insecta
- Order: Lepidoptera
- Family: Apatelodidae
- Genus: Apatelodes
- Species: A. lepida

Binomial name
- Apatelodes lepida Schaus, 1905

Synonyms
- Hygrochroa lepida

Species of moth

Apatelodes lepida is a moth in the family Apatelodidae.
