= Zanola poecila =

Scientific classification
- Kingdom: Animalia
- Phylum: Arthropoda
- Class: Insecta
- Order: Lepidoptera
- Family: Apatelodidae
- Genus: Zanola
- Species: Z. poecila

Binomial name
- Zanola poecila Draudt, 1929

Species of moth

Zanola poecila is a moth in the family Apatelodidae. It was described by Max Wilhelm Karl Draudt in 1929.
