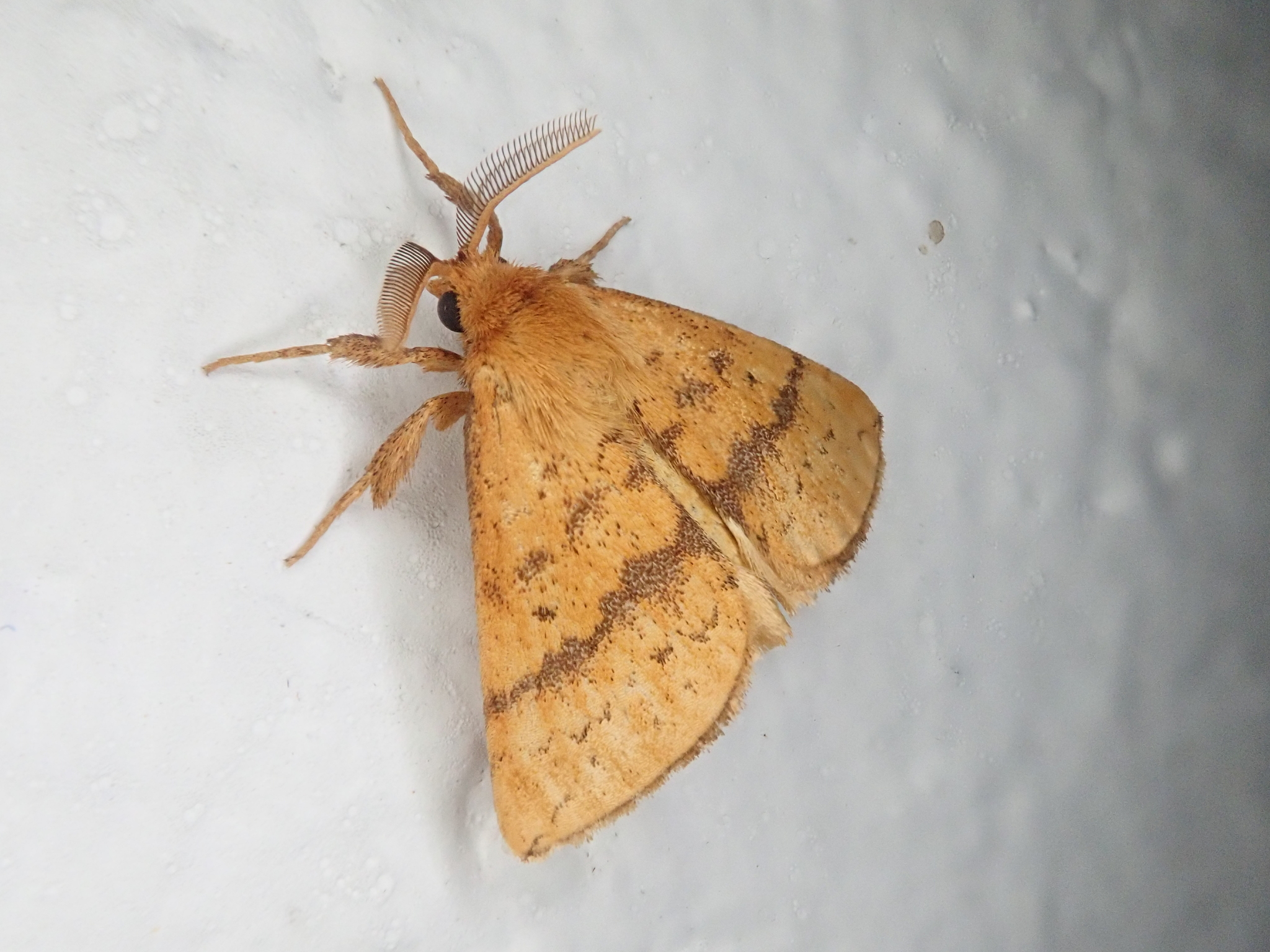
- Carnotena truncata, Brasil

Scientific classification
- Kingdom: Animalia
- Phylum: Arthropoda
- Class: Insecta
- Order: Lepidoptera
- Family: Apatelodidae
- Genus: Carnotena; Walker, 1865

Synonyms
- Microplastis Felder, 1874

= Carnotena =

Genus of moths

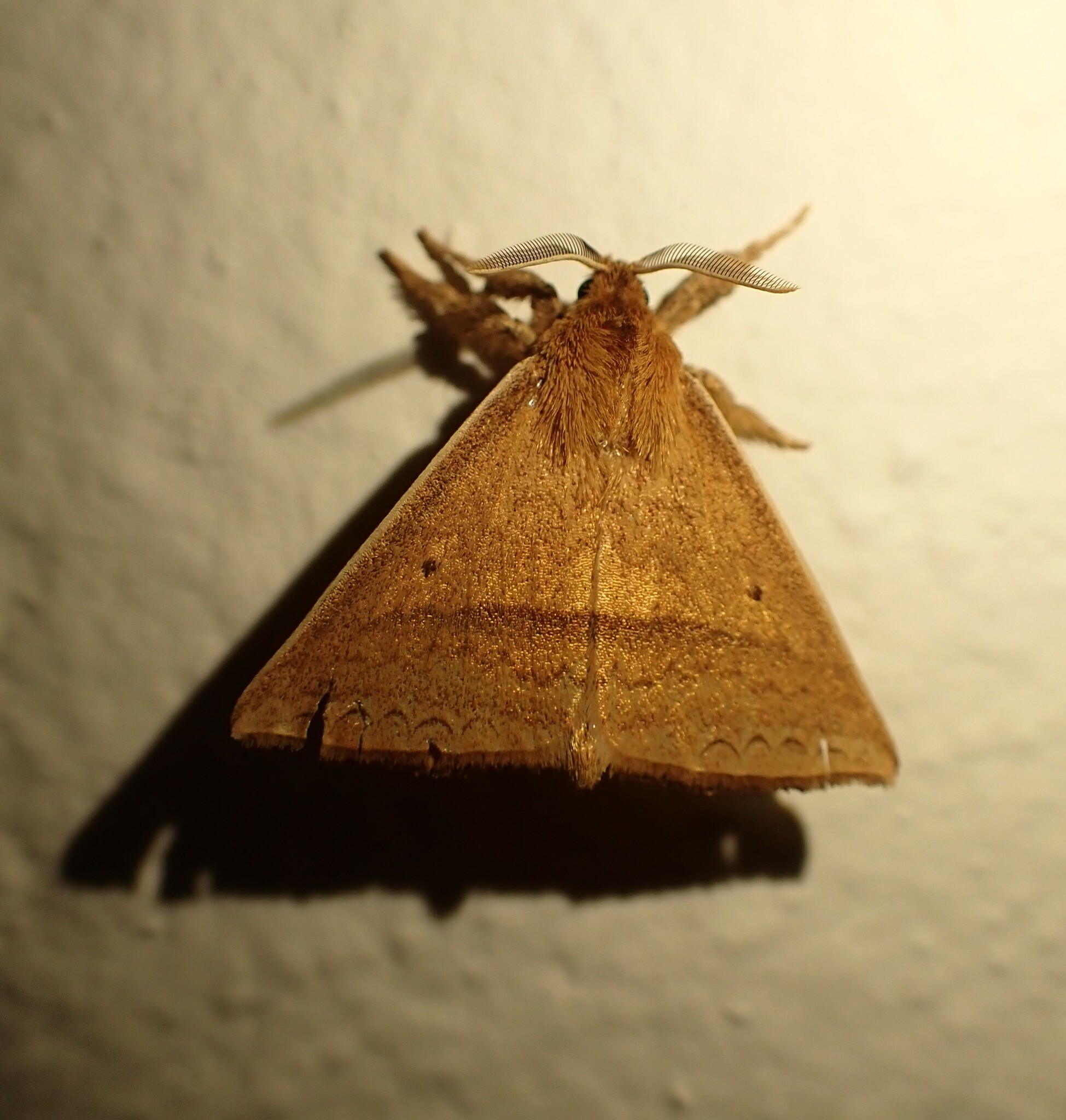
Carnotena jorgenseni, Brasil

Carnotena is a genus in the American silkworm moth family Apatelodidae. There are about six described species in Carnotena, found in South America.

Carnotena xanthiata was formerly the sole species of this genus. In research published in 2024 by Orlandin et al., six species were transferred from the genus Thelosia to Carnotena, and Carnotena xanthiata became Carnotena perlineata.

== Species ==
These species are members of the genus Carnotena:

- Carnotena jorgenseni (Schaus, 1927)
- Carnotena mayaca (Schaus, 1939)
- Carnotena minois (Schaus, 1892)
- Carnotena perlineata (Walker, 1862)
- Carnotena rectilinea (Dognin, 1922)
- Carnotena truncata (Schaus, 1894)
