= Carnotena perlineata =

Scientific classification
- Kingdom: Animalia
- Phylum: Arthropoda
- Clade: Pancrustacea
- Class: Insecta
- Order: Lepidoptera
- Family: Apatelodidae
- Genus: Carnotena
- Species: C. perlineata

Binomial name
- Carnotena perlineata Dyar, 1928

Synonyms
- Carnotena xanthiata Walker, 1865; Microplastis configurata Felder & Felder, 1874; Thelosia impedita Dyar, 1928

Species of moth

Carnotena perlineata is a species of moth in the family Apatelodidae. It was first described by Harrison Gray Dyar Jr. in 1928 and is found in Brazil.
