= Apatelodes thinaha =

Scientific classification
- Kingdom: Animalia
- Phylum: Arthropoda
- Class: Insecta
- Order: Lepidoptera
- Family: Apatelodidae
- Genus: Apatelodes
- Species: A. thinaha

Binomial name
- Apatelodes thinaha Draudt, 1929

Synonyms
- Apatelodes tinaha

Species of moth

Apatelodes thinaha is a moth in the family Apatelodidae. It is found in Minas Gerais, Brazil.
