= Lempira aegina =

Scientific classification
- Kingdom: Animalia
- Phylum: Arthropoda
- Clade: Pancrustacea
- Class: Insecta
- Order: Lepidoptera
- Family: Apatelodidae
- Genus: Lempira
- Species: L. aegina

Binomial name
- Lempira aegina (Stoll, 1782)

Synonyms
- Phaleana aegina Stoll, 1782; Zanola aegina (Stoll, 1782)

Species of moth

Lempira aegina is a species of moth in the family Apatelodidae. It was first described by Caspar Stoll in 1782 and is found in Suriname.
