= Apatelodes quadrata =

Scientific classification
- Kingdom: Animalia
- Phylum: Arthropoda
- Class: Insecta
- Order: Lepidoptera
- Family: Apatelodidae
- Genus: Apatelodes
- Species: A. quadrata

Binomial name
- Apatelodes quadrata E. D. Jones, 1908

Species of moth

Apatelodes quadrata is a moth in the family Apatelodidae first described by E. Dukinfield Jones in 1908. It is found in Paraná, Brazil.

The wingspan is about 41 mm. The forewings are grey, finely sprinkled with light brown. There is a double antemedial line only visible at the inner margin and costa, preceded by a white line and a large dark violaceous-brown spot on the inner margin. There is a brown postmedial line excurved beyond the cell, a brown fascia from the antemedial on the costa to the postmedial, as well as a dark violaceous-brown subapical spot, followed by minute semi hyaline spots and a larger semihyaline (almost glass-like) spot. The basal half of the hindwings is red brown in the form of a square, extending in a nearly straight line to the inner margin, and slightly excavated to the costa followed by a whitish line. The terminal area is fuscous grey.
