= Zanola elongata =

Scientific classification
- Domain: Eukaryota
- Kingdom: Animalia
- Phylum: Arthropoda
- Class: Insecta
- Order: Lepidoptera
- Family: Apatelodidae
- Genus: Zanola
- Species: Z. elongata

Binomial name
- Zanola elongata Schaus, 1910

Species of moth

Zanola elongata is a moth in the family Apatelodidae. It was described by William Schaus in 1910. It is found in Costa Rica.
