= Apatelodes pithala =

Scientific classification
- Kingdom: Animalia
- Phylum: Arthropoda
- Class: Insecta
- Order: Lepidoptera
- Family: Apatelodidae
- Genus: Apatelodes
- Species: A. pithala

Binomial name
- Apatelodes pithala Dognin, 1921

Species of moth

Apatelodes pithala is a moth in the family Apatelodidae. It is commonly found in the Mexican state of Guerrero.
