= Carnotena jorgenseni =

Scientific classification
- Kingdom: Animalia
- Phylum: Arthropoda
- Clade: Pancrustacea
- Class: Insecta
- Order: Lepidoptera
- Family: Apatelodidae
- Genus: Carnotena
- Species: C. jorgenseni

Binomial name
- Carnotena jorgenseni (Schaus, 1927)

Synonyms
- Thelosia jorgenseni Schaus, 1927

Species of moth

Carnotena jorgenseni is a species of moth in the family Apatelodidae. It was first described by William Schaus in 1927 and is found in Paraguay.

== Description ==
The wingspan is about 25 mm. The forewings are cinnamon buff, the base shaded with cinnamon. The hindwings are clay color, but the termen are cinnamon buff.
