= Apatelodes kotzschi =

Scientific classification
- Kingdom: Animalia
- Phylum: Arthropoda
- Class: Insecta
- Order: Lepidoptera
- Family: Apatelodidae
- Genus: Apatelodes
- Species: A. kotzschi

Binomial name
- Apatelodes kotzschi Draudt, 1929

Species of moth

Apatelodes kotzschi is a moth in the family Apatelodidae. It is found in Brazil.
