= Apatelodes moresca =

Scientific classification
- Kingdom: Animalia
- Phylum: Arthropoda
- Class: Insecta
- Order: Lepidoptera
- Family: Apatelodidae
- Genus: Apatelodes
- Species: A. moresca

Binomial name
- Apatelodes moresca Schaus, 1905

Synonyms
- Hygrochroa moresca

Species of moth

Apatelodes moresca is a moth in the family Apatelodidae.
