= Apatelodes velutina =

Scientific classification
- Kingdom: Animalia
- Phylum: Arthropoda
- Class: Insecta
- Order: Lepidoptera
- Family: Apatelodidae
- Genus: Apatelodes
- Species: A. velutina

Binomial name
- Apatelodes velutina Schaus, 1895

Species of moth

Apatelodes velutina is a moth in the family Apatelodidae. It is found in Brazil (São Paulo).
