= Apatelodes lapitha =

Scientific classification
- Kingdom: Animalia
- Phylum: Arthropoda
- Class: Insecta
- Order: Lepidoptera
- Family: Apatelodidae
- Genus: Apatelodes
- Species: A. lapitha

Binomial name
- Apatelodes lapitha H. Druce, 1900

Species of moth

Apatelodes lapitha is a moth in the family Apatelodidae. It is found in Veracruz, Mexico.
