= Apatelodes vistana =

Scientific classification
- Kingdom: Animalia
- Phylum: Arthropoda
- Class: Insecta
- Order: Lepidoptera
- Family: Apatelodidae
- Genus: Apatelodes
- Species: A. vistana

Binomial name
- Apatelodes vistana Schaus, 1939

Synonyms
- Hygrochroa vistana

Species of moth

Apatelodes vistana is a moth in the family Apatelodidae. It is found in Colombia.
