= Tuyvae orion =

Scientific classification
- Kingdom: Animalia
- Phylum: Arthropoda
- Clade: Pancrustacea
- Class: Insecta
- Order: Lepidoptera
- Family: Apatelodidae
- Genus: Tuyvae
- Species: T. orion

Binomial name
- Tuyvae orion (Dognin, 1916)

Synonyms
- Parathyris orion Dognin, 1916; Tamphana orion (Dognin, 1916)

Species of moth

Tuyvae orion is a species of moth in the family Apatelodidae. It was first described by Paul Dognin in 1916 and is found in French Guiana.
