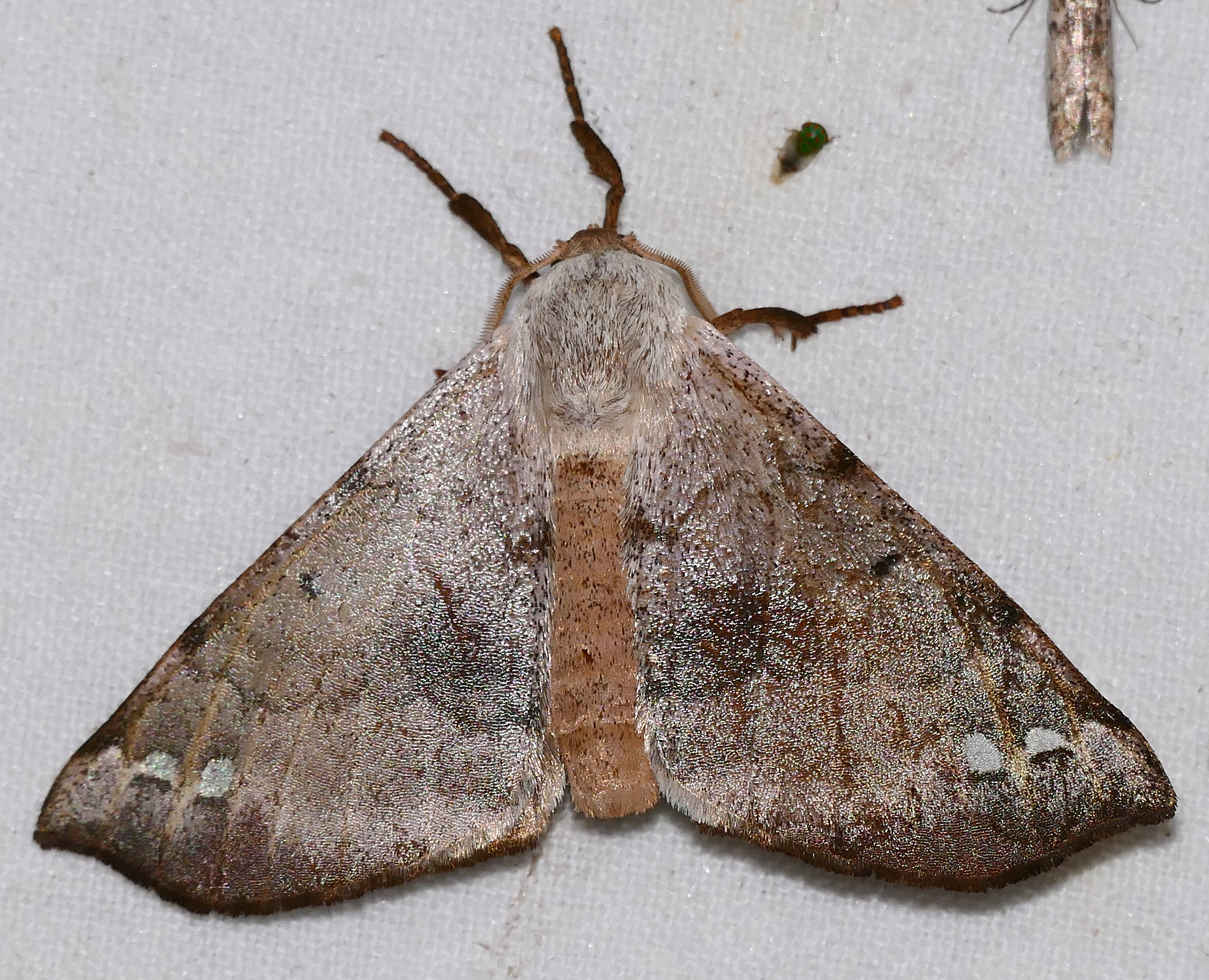

Scientific classification
- Kingdom: Animalia
- Phylum: Arthropoda
- Clade: Pancrustacea
- Class: Insecta
- Order: Lepidoptera
- Family: Apatelodidae
- Genus: Caribas
- Species: C. anna

Binomial name
- Caribas anna (Schaus, 1905)

Synonyms
- Olceclostera anna Schaus, 1905; Apatelodes anna (Schaus, 1905)

= Caribas anna =

Species of moth

Caribas anna is a species of moth in the family Apatelodidae. It is found in French Guiana.
