= Apatelodes taperinha =

Scientific classification
- Kingdom: Animalia
- Phylum: Arthropoda
- Class: Insecta
- Order: Lepidoptera
- Family: Apatelodidae
- Genus: Apatelodes
- Species: A. taperinha

Binomial name
- Apatelodes taperinha Dognin, 1922

Synonyms
- Hygrochroa taperinha

Species of moth

Apatelodes taperinha is a moth in the family Apatelodidae.
