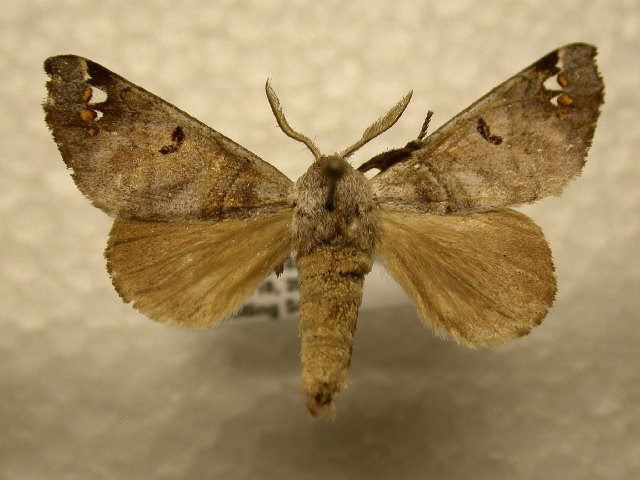

Scientific classification
- Kingdom: Animalia
- Phylum: Arthropoda
- Class: Insecta
- Order: Lepidoptera
- Family: Apatelodidae
- Genus: Pantelodes
- Species: P. satellitia

Binomial name
- Pantelodes satellitia (Walker, 1855)

Synonyms
- Apatelodes satellittia; Apatelodes satellitia (Walker, 1855); Parathyris satellitia Walker, 1855

= Pantelodes satellitia =

Species of moth

Pantelodes satellitia is a moth in the family Apatelodidae. It is found in Costa Rica, French Guiana and Bolivia. It was transferred from Apatelodes to the newly-established genus Pantelodes by Daniel Herbin in 2017.
