= Apatelodes pertuisa =

Scientific classification
- Kingdom: Animalia
- Phylum: Arthropoda
- Class: Insecta
- Order: Lepidoptera
- Family: Apatelodidae
- Genus: Apatelodes
- Species: A. pertuisa

Binomial name
- Apatelodes pertuisa (Dognin, 1916)

Synonyms
- Zanola pertuisa Dognin, 1916

Species of moth

Apatelodes pertuisa is a moth in the family Apatelodidae. It is found in Venezuela.
