= Crastolliana ardeola =

Scientific classification
- Kingdom: Animalia
- Phylum: Arthropoda
- Clade: Pancrustacea
- Class: Insecta
- Order: Lepidoptera
- Family: Apatelodidae
- Genus: Crastolliana
- Species: C. ardeola

Binomial name
- Crastolliana ardeola (H. Druce, 1887)

Synonyms
- Apatelodes mediana Schaus, 1900; Apatelodes vitrea Schaus, 1910; Apatelodes ardeola H. Druce, 1887

Species of moth

Crastolliana ardeola is a species of moth in the family Apatelodidae that was first described by Herbert Druce in 1887. It is found in the Mexican state of Tabasco and from Panama to the Amazon region.
