= Tibira liliana =

Scientific classification
- Kingdom: Animalia
- Phylum: Arthropoda
- Clade: Pancrustacea
- Class: Insecta
- Order: Lepidoptera
- Family: Apatelodidae
- Genus: Tibira
- Species: T. liliana

Binomial name
- Tibira liliana (Schaus, 1900)

Synonyms
- Colabata jucunda Dognin; Colabata liliana Schaus, 1900; Ephoria liliana (Schaus, 1900)

Species of moth

Tibira liliana is a species of moth in the family Apatelodidae. It was first described by Schaus in 1900 and is found in Brazil (Parana).
