= Ephoria ephora =

Scientific classification
- Domain: Eukaryota
- Kingdom: Animalia
- Phylum: Arthropoda
- Class: Insecta
- Order: Lepidoptera
- Family: Apatelodidae
- Genus: Ephoria
- Species: E. ephora

Binomial name
- Ephoria ephora (Stoll, 1781)

Synonyms
- Phalaena ephora Stoll, 1781; Colabata uzita Druce, 1899

Species of moth

Ephoria ephora is a moth in the family Apatelodidae. It was described by Caspar Stoll in 1781, from a specimen from Suriname.

== Original description ==
As Phalaena ephora, by Caspar Stoll (1781) in Cramer, Pieter. De uitlandsche kapellen voorkomende in de drie waereld-deelen, Asia, Africa en America (in Dutch and French). p. 110.
