= Zanola hezia =

Scientific classification
- Kingdom: Animalia
- Phylum: Arthropoda
- Clade: Pancrustacea
- Class: Insecta
- Order: Lepidoptera
- Family: Apatelodidae
- Genus: Zanola
- Species: Z. hezia

Binomial name
- Zanola hezia (Druce, 1899)

Synonyms
- Leiosoma hezia Druce, 1899; Colabata hezia (Druce, 1899); Ephoria hezia (Druce, 1899)

Species of moth

Zanola hezia is a species of moth in the family Apatelodidae. It was first described by Herbert Druce in 1899.
