= Ephoria mendozata =

Scientific classification
- Kingdom: Animalia
- Phylum: Arthropoda
- Clade: Pancrustacea
- Class: Insecta
- Order: Lepidoptera
- Family: Apatelodidae
- Genus: Ephoria
- Species: E. mendozata

Binomial name
- Ephoria mendozata (Dognin, 1923)

Species of moth

Ephoria mendozata is a moth in the Apatelodidae family. It was described by Paul Dognin in 1923. It is found in Paraguay.
