= Drepatelodes umbrilinea =

Scientific classification
- Domain: Eukaryota
- Kingdom: Animalia
- Phylum: Arthropoda
- Class: Insecta
- Order: Lepidoptera
- Family: Apatelodidae
- Genus: Drepatelodes
- Species: D. umbrilinea

Binomial name
- Drepatelodes umbrilinea (Schaus, 1905)

Species of moth

Drepatelodes umbrilinea is a moth in the Apatelodidae family. It was described by Schaus in 1905. It was originally described as Olceclostera umbrilinea Schaus, 1905 from French Guiana, and later said to also be in Brazil and Panama.

See also the later misspelling Drepatelodes umbrillinea [sic], as per several references, e.g. Kitching et al. 2018
