= Tuyvae maoma =

Scientific classification
- Kingdom: Animalia
- Phylum: Arthropoda
- Clade: Pancrustacea
- Class: Insecta
- Order: Lepidoptera
- Family: Apatelodidae
- Genus: Tuyvae
- Species: T. maoma

Binomial name
- Tuyvae maoma (Schaus, 1920)

Synonyms
- Tamphana maoma Schaus 1920

Species of moth

Tuyvae maoma is a species of moth in the family Apatelodidae. It was first described by William Schaus in 1920 and is found in French Guiana.
