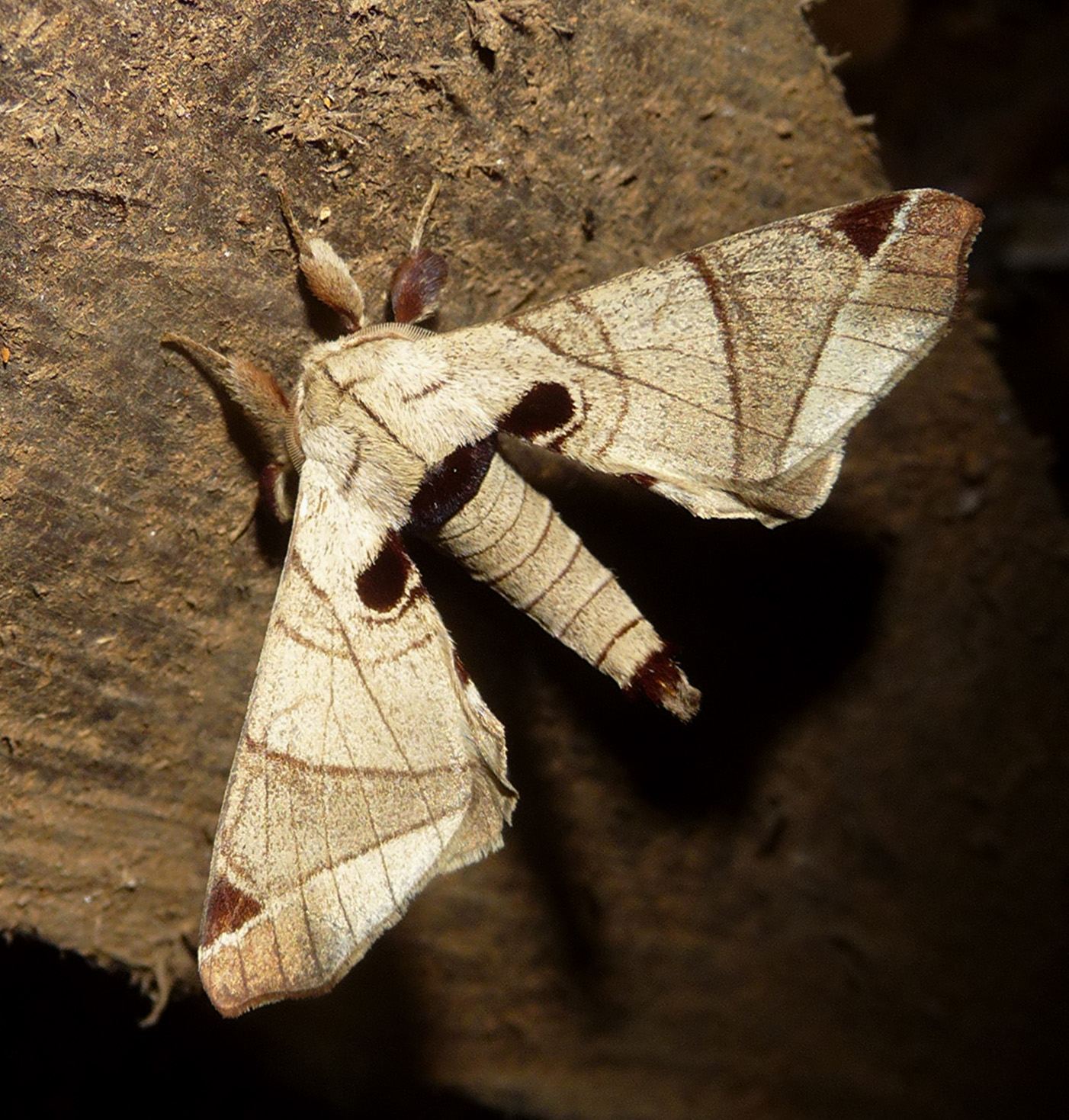

Scientific classification
- Kingdom: Animalia
- Phylum: Arthropoda
- Class: Insecta
- Order: Lepidoptera
- Family: Apatelodidae
- Genus: Apatelodes
- Species: A. pandarioides

Binomial name
- Apatelodes pandarioides Schaus, 1905

= Apatelodes pandarioides =

Species of moth

Apatelodes pandarioides is a moth in the family Apatelodidae. It is found in French Guiana.

The wingspan is about 44 mm. There is an antemedial dark velvety brown spot on the inner margin of the forewings, followed by a dark brown line, a dark curved medial line and a more heavily marked postmedial line. There is also a subterminal line from the costa at three-fourths from the base, followed on the costa by a triangular dark brown spot outwardly edged with buff. The outer third of hindwings is darkest. There is an indistinct postmedial line and there are some dark brown streaks on the inner margin.
