= Apatelodes paulista =

Scientific classification
- Kingdom: Animalia
- Phylum: Arthropoda
- Class: Insecta
- Order: Lepidoptera
- Family: Apatelodidae
- Genus: Apatelodes
- Species: A. paulista

Binomial name
- Apatelodes paulista E. D. Jones, 1908

Species of moth

Apatelodes paulista is a moth in the family Apatelodidae first described by E. Dukinfield Jones in 1908. It is found in São Paulo, Brazil.

The wingspan is about 47 – 57 mm. The forewings are grey, irrorated (sprinkled) with yellowish-brown, with a light brown wavy antemedial band. The hindwings are yellowish-brown with indistinct medial and postmedial lines.
