= Olceclostera tropea =

Scientific classification
- Kingdom: Animalia
- Phylum: Arthropoda
- Clade: Pancrustacea
- Class: Insecta
- Order: Lepidoptera
- Family: Apatelodidae
- Genus: Olceclostera
- Species: O. tropea

Binomial name
- Olceclostera tropea (Schaus, 1896)

Synonyms
- Thelosia tropea Schaus, 1896; Hygrochroa tropea; Apatelodes tropea (Schaus, 1896)

Species of moth

Olceclostera tropea is a species of moth in the family Apatelodidae. It is found in Brazil.

The wingspan is about 28 mm.
