= Apatelodes infesta =

Scientific classification
- Kingdom: Animalia
- Phylum: Arthropoda
- Class: Insecta
- Order: Lepidoptera
- Family: Apatelodidae
- Genus: Apatelodes
- Species: A. infesta

Binomial name
- Apatelodes infesta Dognin, 1922

Synonyms
- Hygrochroa infesta

Species of moth

Apatelodes infesta is a moth in the family Apatelodidae.
