= Zanola verago =

Scientific classification
- Domain: Eukaryota
- Kingdom: Animalia
- Phylum: Arthropoda
- Class: Insecta
- Order: Lepidoptera
- Family: Apatelodidae
- Genus: Zanola
- Species: Z. verago

Binomial name
- Zanola verago (Cramer, 1777)

Synonyms
- Phalaena verago Cramer, [1777]; Phalaena verago Stoll, [1780]; Zanola difficilis Walker, 1855; Zanola harpis Druce, 1887; Zanola vivax (H. Edwards, 1884); Apatelodes vivax H. Edwards, 1884

Species of moth

Zanola verago is a moth in the family Apatelodidae. It was described by Pieter Cramer in 1777. It is found in Venezuela and Suriname.
