= Arotros striata =

Scientific classification
- Domain: Eukaryota
- Kingdom: Animalia
- Phylum: Arthropoda
- Class: Insecta
- Order: Lepidoptera
- Family: Apatelodidae
- Genus: Arotros
- Species: A. striata

Binomial name
- Arotros striata Schaus, 1892

Species of moth

Arotros striata is a species of moth in the family Apatelodidae, found in Brazil.

The wingspan of Arotros striata is approximately 45 mm. The wings are buff-colored with brown veins and striations. The base and proximal half of the costal margin of the forewings are dark grey, as is the head. The collar is brown, with darker margins. The thorax and abdomen are buff—the latter with numerous longitudinal dark streaks.
