= Zapata corema =

Scientific classification
- Kingdom: Animalia
- Phylum: Arthropoda
- Clade: Pancrustacea
- Class: Insecta
- Order: Lepidoptera
- Family: Apatelodidae
- Genus: Zapata
- Species: Z. corema

Binomial name
- Zapata corema (Schaus, 1896)

Synonyms
- Apatelodes corema Schaus]], 1896

Species of moth

Zapata corema is a species of moth in the family Apatelodidae. It is found in Brazil (São Paulo).
