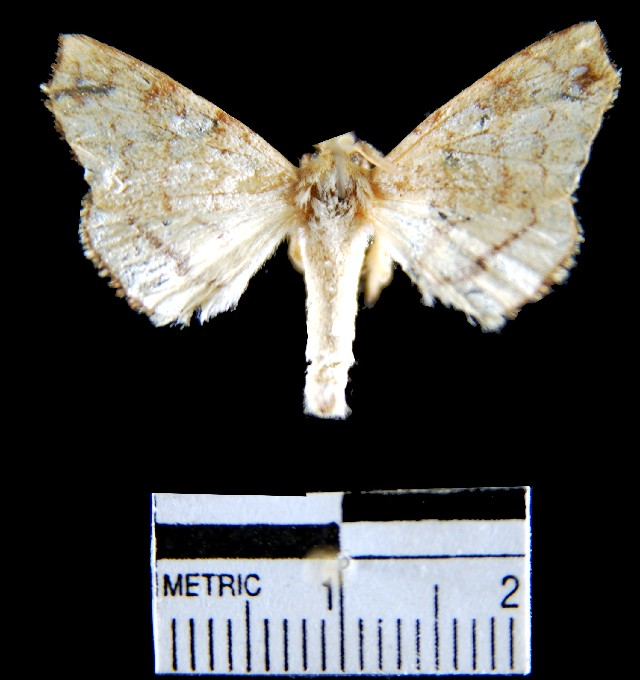

Scientific classification
- Kingdom: Animalia
- Phylum: Arthropoda
- Class: Insecta
- Order: Lepidoptera
- Family: Apatelodidae
- Genus: Apatelodes
- Species: A. tuisa

Binomial name
- Apatelodes tuisa Schaus, 1910

Synonyms
- Zanola tuisa

= Apatelodes tuisa =

Species of moth

Apatelodes tuisa is a moth in the family Apatelodidae. It is found in Costa Rica, Panama and Guatemala.
