= Zanola lychnica =

Scientific classification
- Domain: Eukaryota
- Kingdom: Animalia
- Phylum: Arthropoda
- Class: Insecta
- Order: Lepidoptera
- Family: Apatelodidae
- Genus: Zanola
- Species: Z. lychnica

Binomial name
- Zanola lychnica Dognin, 1920

Species of moth

Zanola lychnica is a moth in the family Apatelodidae. It was described by Paul Dognin in 1920. The type location is Upper Madre de Dios, probably referring to the Madre de Dios River in Peru.
