= Apatelodes inviolata =

Scientific classification
- Kingdom: Animalia
- Phylum: Arthropoda
- Class: Insecta
- Order: Lepidoptera
- Family: Apatelodidae
- Genus: Apatelodes
- Species: A. inviolata

Binomial name
- Apatelodes inviolata Dognin, 1911

Species of moth

Apatelodes inviolata is a moth in the family Apatelodidae. It is found in Costa Rica.
