= Lempira fieldi =

Scientific classification
- Kingdom: Animalia
- Phylum: Arthropoda
- Clade: Pancrustacea
- Class: Insecta
- Order: Lepidoptera
- Family: Apatelodidae
- Genus: Lempira
- Species: L. fieldi

Binomial name
- Lempira fieldi (Schaus, 1910)

Synonyms
- Zanola fieldi Schaus, 1910

Species of moth

Lempira fieldi is a species of moth in the family Apatelodidae. It was first described by William Schaus in 1910 and is found in Costa Rica.
