= Apatelodes sadisma =

Scientific classification
- Kingdom: Animalia
- Phylum: Arthropoda
- Class: Insecta
- Order: Lepidoptera
- Family: Apatelodidae
- Genus: Apatelodes
- Species: A. sadisma

Binomial name
- Apatelodes sadisma Dyar, 1918

Synonyms
- Apatelodes sadisma f. schreiteri Schaus, 1924

Species of moth

Apatelodes sadisma is a moth in the family Apatelodidae. It is found in Mexico (Veracruz).
