= Ephoria marginalis =

Scientific classification
- Kingdom: Animalia
- Phylum: Arthropoda
- Clade: Pancrustacea
- Class: Insecta
- Order: Lepidoptera
- Family: Apatelodidae
- Genus: Ephoria
- Species: E. marginalis

Binomial name
- Ephoria marginalis (Walker, 1856)

Synonyms
- Andriasa marginalis Walker, 1856; Colabata lineosa Walker, 1856; Colabata marginalis; Colabata basifulva Kaye, 1901

Species of moth

Ephoria marginalis is a moth in the family Apatelodidae. It was described by Francis Walker in 1856. It is found in Brazil.
