= Baigura =

Baigura is a Basque place name meaning 'end of the valley' (from ibai < ibarre 'valley' and gura 'inclination' / guren 'end'). It may refer to:

- Baigura, Navarre (1 477 m) on the left bank of the Irati in Navarre (Spain)
- Mount Baigura (897 m) where the basins of the Nive and the Bidouze diverge (France)
