= Ephoria thea =

Scientific classification
- Kingdom: Animalia
- Phylum: Arthropoda
- Clade: Pancrustacea
- Class: Insecta
- Order: Lepidoptera
- Family: Apatelodidae
- Genus: Ephoria
- Species: E. thea

Binomial name
- Ephoria thea (Schaus, 1924)

Species of moth

Ephoria thea is a moth in the Apatelodidae family. It was described by Schaus in 1924. It is found in Argentina.
