= Apatelodes ennomoides =

Scientific classification
- Kingdom: Animalia
- Phylum: Arthropoda
- Class: Insecta
- Order: Lepidoptera
- Family: Apatelodidae
- Genus: Apatelodes
- Species: A. ennomoides

Binomial name
- Apatelodes ennomoides Walker, 1865

Species of moth

Apatelodes ennomoides is a moth in the family Apatelodidae. It is found in South America.
