= Apatelodes hierax =

Scientific classification
- Kingdom: Animalia
- Phylum: Arthropoda
- Class: Insecta
- Order: Lepidoptera
- Family: Apatelodidae
- Genus: Apatelodes
- Species: A. hierax

Binomial name
- Apatelodes hierax Dognin, 1924

Species of moth

Apatelodes hierax is a moth in the family Apatelodidae. It is found in Brazil.
