= Ephoria dora =

Scientific classification
- Kingdom: Animalia
- Phylum: Arthropoda
- Clade: Pancrustacea
- Class: Insecta
- Order: Lepidoptera
- Family: Apatelodidae
- Genus: Ephoria
- Species: E. dora

Binomial name
- Ephoria dora (Schaus, 1896)

Species of moth

Ephoria dora is a moth in the Apatelodidae family. It was described by Schaus in 1896. It is found in south-eastern Brazil.

== Description ==
The wingspan is about 50 mm. The forewings are greyish, thickly mottled with darker scales. The outer margin is broadly yellowish, with a very indistinct wavy basal line and a small yellowish spot containing a brown point in the cell. There is an irregular outer wavy shade separating the darker portion of the wing from the yellowish outer margin. The hindwings are light brown, somewhat yellowish on the outer margin.

== Original publication ==
As Colabata dora, in Schaus, William (1896). "New Species of Heterocera". Journal of the New York Entomological Society. 4: 52–53.
