= Olceclostera truvena =

Scientific classification
- Kingdom: Animalia
- Phylum: Arthropoda
- Clade: Pancrustacea
- Class: Insecta
- Order: Lepidoptera
- Family: Apatelodidae
- Genus: Olceclostera
- Species: O. truvena

Binomial name
- Olceclostera truvena Schaus, 1896

Synonyms
- Thelosia truvena Schaus, 1896

Species of moth

Olceclostera truvena is a species of moth in the family Apatelodidae. It was first described by William Schaus in 1896 and is found in Brazil (São Paulo).

The wingspan is about 30 mm.
