= Apatelodes paratima =

Scientific classification
- Kingdom: Animalia
- Phylum: Arthropoda
- Class: Insecta
- Order: Lepidoptera
- Family: Apatelodidae
- Genus: Apatelodes
- Species: A. paratima

Binomial name
- Apatelodes paratima Schaus, 1910

Synonyms
- Apatelodes paratima f. lilacina E. D. Jones, 1908

Species of moth

Apatelodes paratima is a moth in the family Apatelodidae first described by William Schaus in 1910. It is found in Mexico, Guatemala, Panama and Costa Rica.
