= Apatelodes imparata =

Scientific classification
- Kingdom: Animalia
- Phylum: Arthropoda
- Class: Insecta
- Order: Lepidoptera
- Family: Apatelodidae
- Genus: Apatelodes
- Species: A. imparata

Binomial name
- Apatelodes imparata Dognin, 1907

Species of moth

Apatelodes imparata is a species of moth in the family Apatelodidae. It is found in Paraguay.
