= Apatelodes zikani =

Scientific classification
- Kingdom: Animalia
- Phylum: Arthropoda
- Class: Insecta
- Order: Lepidoptera
- Family: Apatelodidae
- Genus: Apatelodes
- Species: A. zikani

Binomial name
- Apatelodes zikani Draudt, 1929

Species of moth

Apatelodes zikani is a moth in the family Apatelodidae. It is found in Argentina and Brazil.
