= Apatelodes xanthapex =

Scientific classification
- Kingdom: Animalia
- Phylum: Arthropoda
- Class: Insecta
- Order: Lepidoptera
- Family: Apatelodidae
- Genus: Apatelodes
- Species: A. xanthapex

Binomial name
- Apatelodes xanthapex Draudt, 1929

Synonyms
- Apatelodes xanthapex f. garleppi Draudt, 1929

Species of moth

Apatelodes xanthapex is a moth in the family Apatelodidae. It is found in Minas Gerais, Brazil.
