= Apatelodes signata =

Scientific classification
- Kingdom: Animalia
- Phylum: Arthropoda
- Class: Insecta
- Order: Lepidoptera
- Family: Apatelodidae
- Genus: Apatelodes
- Species: A. signata

Binomial name
- Apatelodes signata H. Druce, 1904

Species of moth

Apatelodes signata is a moth in the family Apatelodidae. It was first described by Herbert Druce in 1904. It is found in south-eastern Peru.

The forewings are dark brown, irrorated (sprinkled) with minute greyish scales. There is a pale brown spot at the end of the cell and a dark brown curved line across the wing beyond the middle from the costal to the inner margin. A submarginal greyish curved line extends from the apex to the anal angle. The hindwings are dark fawn, crossed below the middle from the apex to the inner margin by two faint brown lines.
