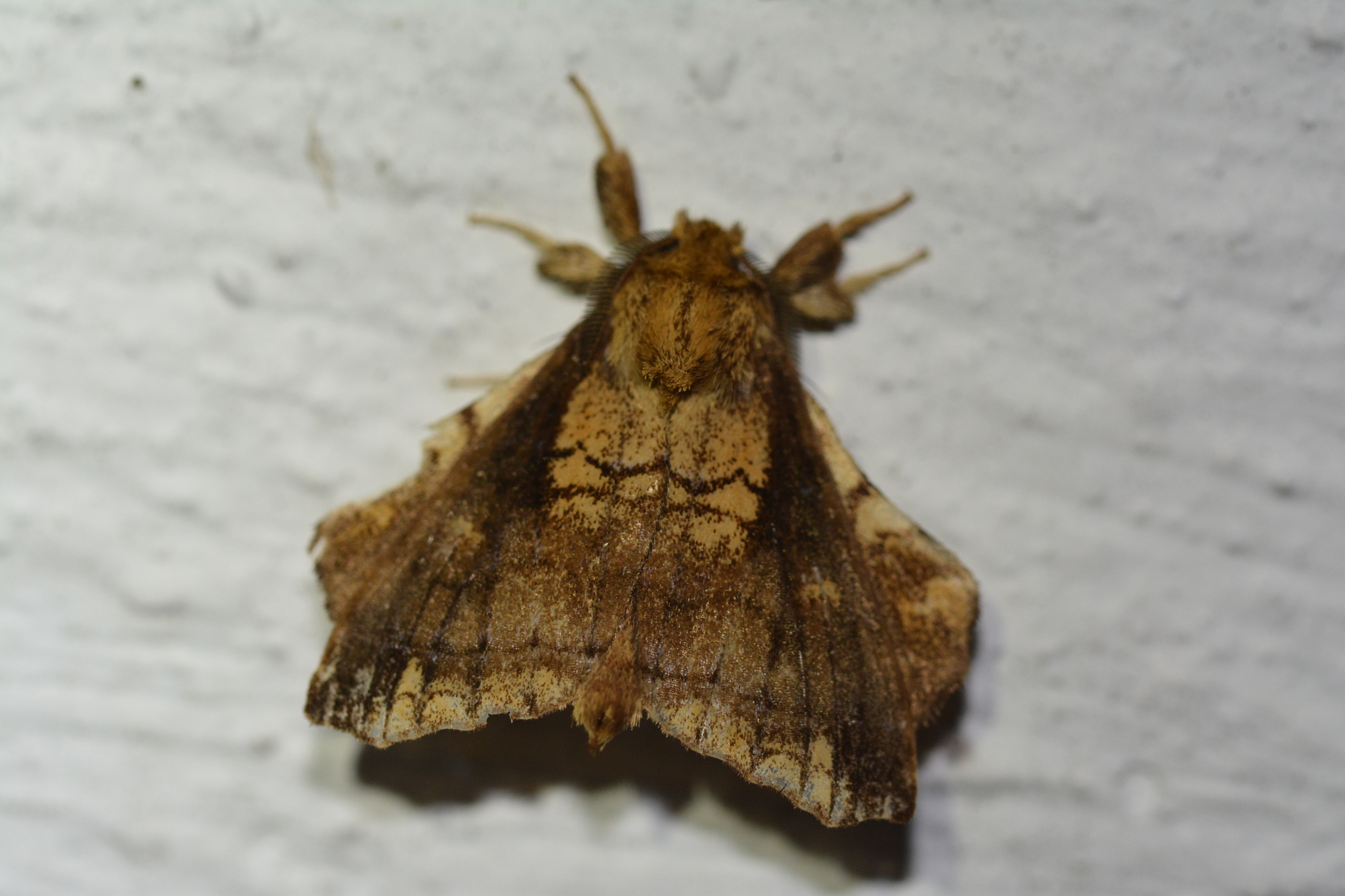

Scientific classification
- Kingdom: Animalia
- Phylum: Arthropoda
- Clade: Pancrustacea
- Class: Insecta
- Order: Lepidoptera
- Family: Apatelodidae
- Genus: Lempira
- Species: L. impedita

Binomial name
- Lempira impedita Dognin, 1916

Synonyms
- Zanola impedita (Dognin, 1916)

= Lempira impedita =

Species of moth

Lempira impedita is a species of moth in the family Apatelodidae. It was first described by Paul Dognin in 1916 and is found in Colombia.
