= Thelosia postflavida =

Scientific classification
- Domain: Eukaryota
- Kingdom: Animalia
- Phylum: Arthropoda
- Class: Insecta
- Order: Lepidoptera
- Family: Apatelodidae
- Genus: Thelosia
- Species: T. postflavida

Binomial name
- Thelosia postflavida Draudt, 1929

Species of moth

Thelosia postflavida is a moth in the family Apatelodidae. It was described by Max Wilhelm Karl Draudt in 1929, with a type locality in Brazil.
