= Apatelodes narda =

Scientific classification
- Kingdom: Animalia
- Phylum: Arthropoda
- Class: Insecta
- Order: Lepidoptera
- Family: Apatelodidae
- Genus: Apatelodes
- Species: A. narda

Binomial name
- Apatelodes narda Schaus, 1900

Synonyms
- Hygrochroa narda

Species of moth

Apatelodes narda is a moth in the family Apatelodidae.
