= Thelosia camina =

Scientific classification
- Domain: Eukaryota
- Kingdom: Animalia
- Phylum: Arthropoda
- Class: Insecta
- Order: Lepidoptera
- Family: Apatelodidae
- Genus: Thelosia
- Species: T. camina

Binomial name
- Thelosia camina Schaus, 1896

Species of moth

Thelosia camina is a moth in the family Apatelodidae. It was described by William Schaus in 1896. It is found in Brazil (Parana).

The wingspan is about 38 mm. The forewings are fawn, finely speckled with brown. The hindwings are brownish at the base, but fawn on the outer portion.
