= Carnotena mayaca =

Scientific classification
- Kingdom: Animalia
- Phylum: Arthropoda
- Clade: Pancrustacea
- Class: Insecta
- Order: Lepidoptera
- Family: Apatelodidae
- Genus: Carnotena
- Species: C. mayaca

Binomial name
- Carnotena mayaca (Schaus, 1939)

Synonyms
- Thelosia mayaca Schaus, 1939

Species of moth

Carnotena mayaca is a species of moth in the family Apatelodidae. It was first described by William Schaus in 1939 and is found in Peru.
