= Tapuia banepa =

Scientific classification
- Kingdom: Animalia
- Phylum: Arthropoda
- Clade: Pancrustacea
- Class: Insecta
- Order: Lepidoptera
- Family: Apatelodidae
- Genus: Tapuia
- Species: T. banepa

Binomial name
- Tapuia banepa H. Druce, 1904

Synonyms
- Apatelodes banepa H. Druce, 1904

Species of moth

Tapuia banepa is a species of moth in the family Apatelodidae. It is found in south-eastern Peru.

== Description ==
The forewings are greyish brown with two small white spots close to the apex, edged with black on the inner side. There is a large elongated dark brown spot close to the base on the inner margin, and there are three black zigzag lines across the wing from the costal to the inner margin. The hindwings are pale reddish brown, crossed about the middle by an indistinct whitish line.
