= Apatelodes ilia =

Scientific classification
- Kingdom: Animalia
- Phylum: Arthropoda
- Class: Insecta
- Order: Lepidoptera
- Family: Apatelodidae
- Genus: Apatelodes
- Species: A. ilia

Binomial name
- Apatelodes ilia Dognin, 1916

Species of moth

Apatelodes ilia is a moth in the family Apatelodidae. It is found in South America.
