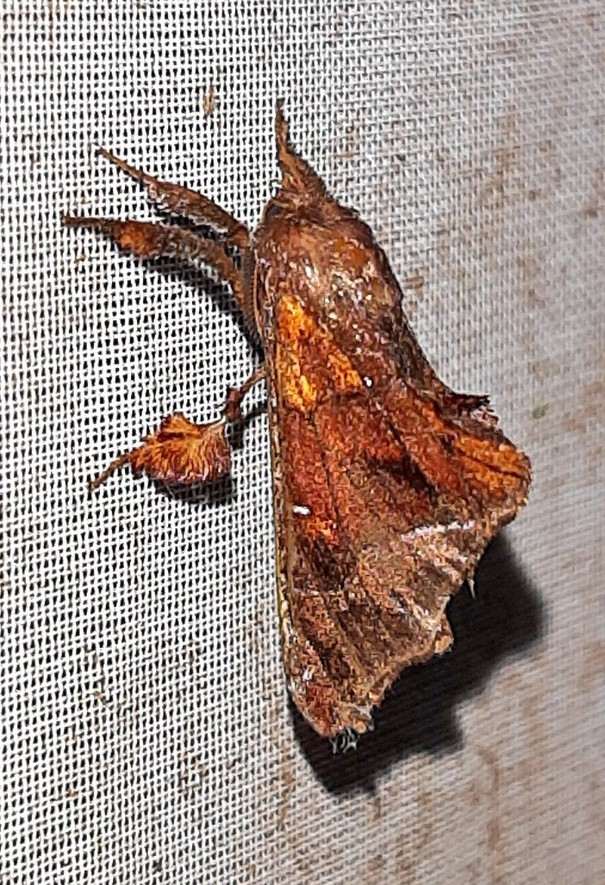

Scientific classification
- Domain: Eukaryota
- Kingdom: Animalia
- Phylum: Arthropoda
- Class: Insecta
- Order: Lepidoptera
- Family: Apatelodidae
- Genus: Thyrioclostera; Draudt, 1929
- Species: T. trespuntada

Binomial name
- Thyrioclostera trespuntada (Dognin, 1894)

Synonyms
- (Species): Callopistria trespuntada Dognin, 1894

= Thyrioclostera =

Thyrioclostera trespuntada

Genus of moths

Thyrioclostera is a genus of moths of the family Apatelodidae which was erected in 1929 by Max Wilhelm Karl Draudt. It is monotypic, having a single species, Thyrioclostera trespuntada originally described as Callopistria trespuntada by Paul Dognin in 1894, and which is known from Ecuador and Peru.
