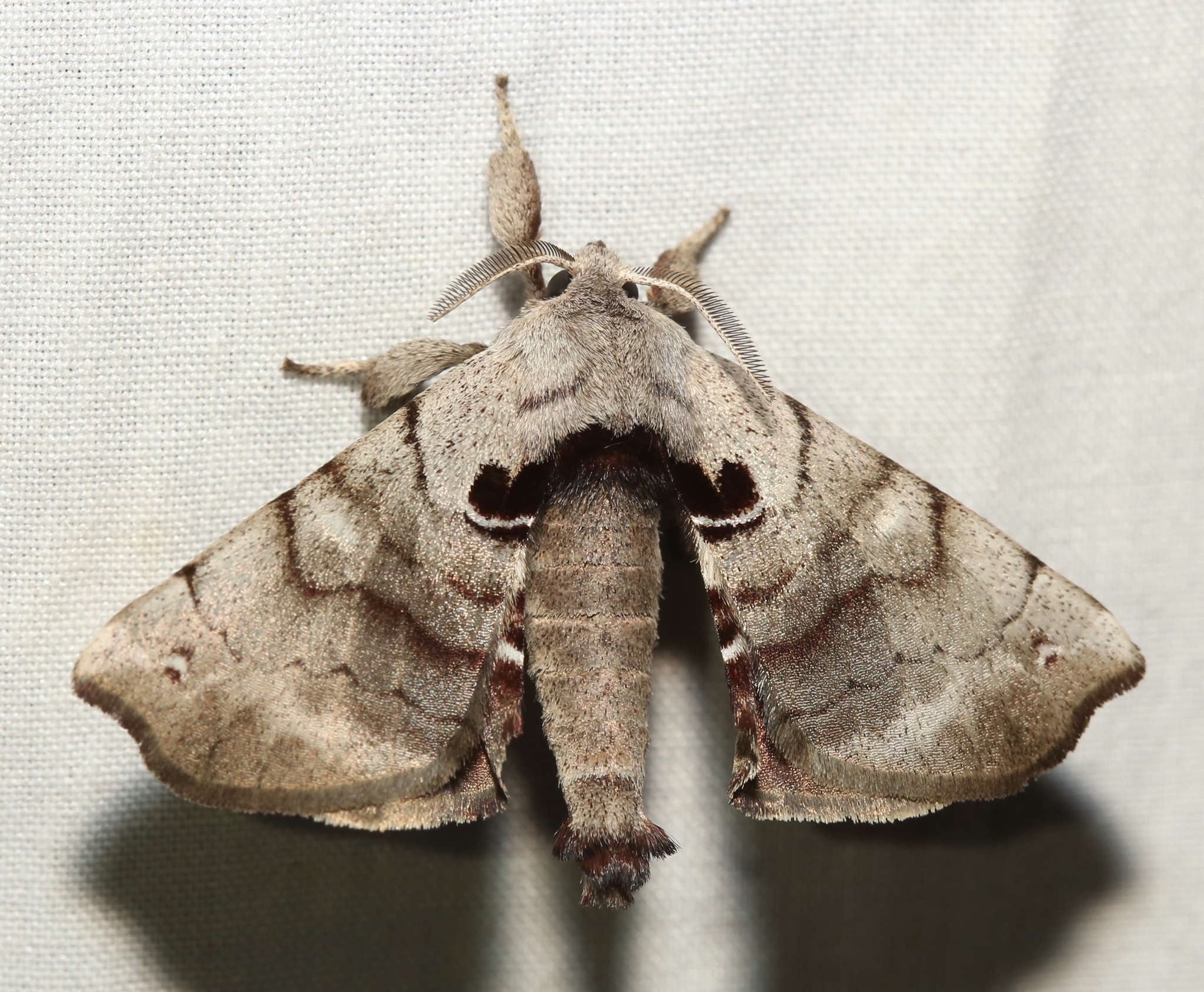

Scientific classification
- Kingdom: Animalia
- Phylum: Arthropoda
- Class: Insecta
- Order: Lepidoptera
- Family: Apatelodidae
- Genus: Apatelodes
- Species: A. torrefacta

Binomial name
- Apatelodes torrefacta (J. E. Smith, 1797)

Synonyms
- Phalaena torrefacta Smith, 1797; Apatelodes torrefacta var. floridana H. Edwards, 1886

= Apatelodes torrefacta =

Spotted apatelodes

Species of moth

Apatelodes torrefacta, the spotted apatelodes, is a moth in the family Apatelodidae. The species was first described by Smith in 1797. It is found in North America from Maine and southern Ontario to Florida, west to Texas, and north to Wisconsin.

The wingspan is 32–42 mm. Adults are on wing from May to August. There are two generations per year in the south and one in the north.

The larvae start off gray and become a bright yellow color as they mature. They feed on Fraxinus, Prunus, Acer and Quercus species.

== Gallery ==
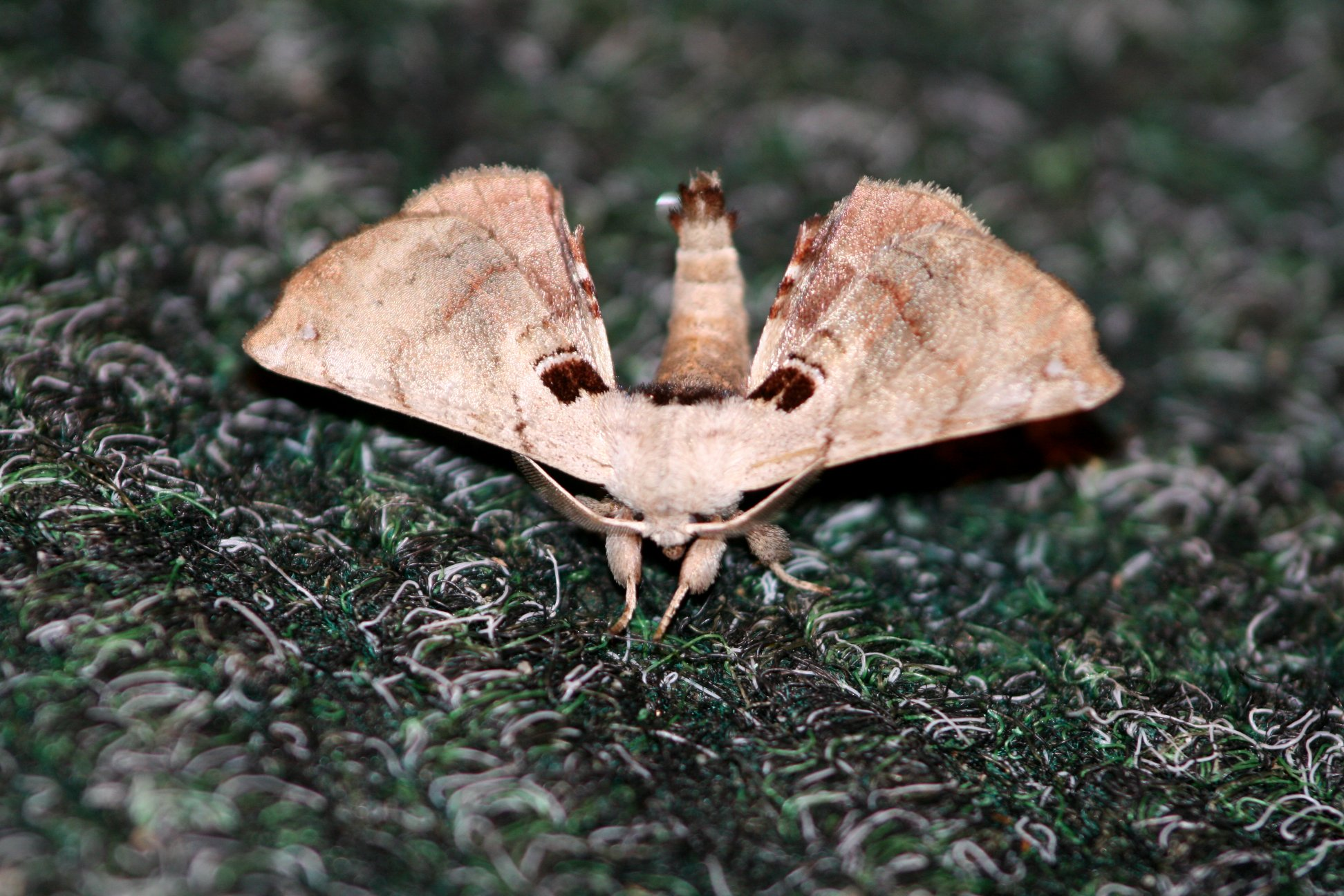
Front view

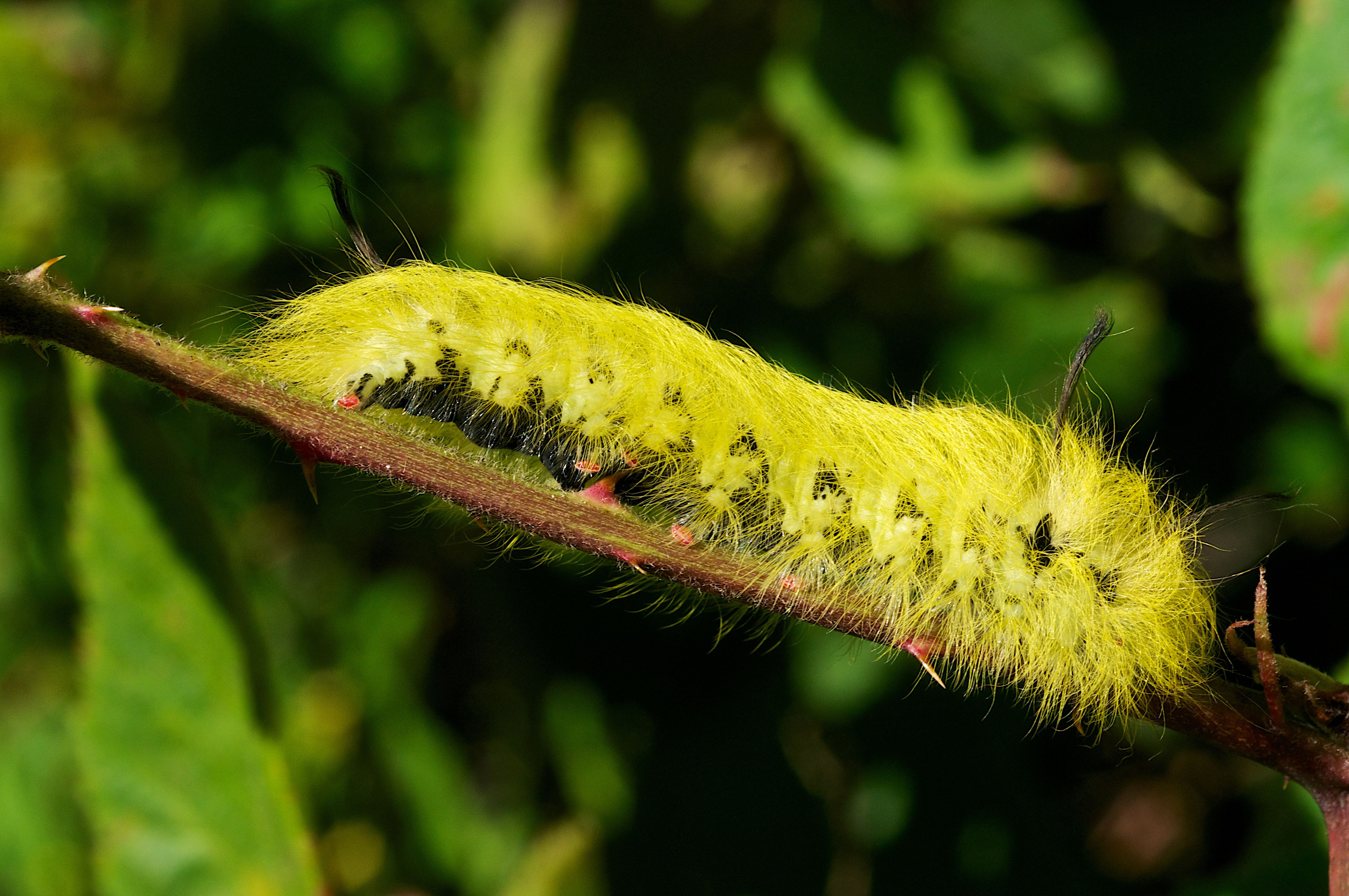
Larva

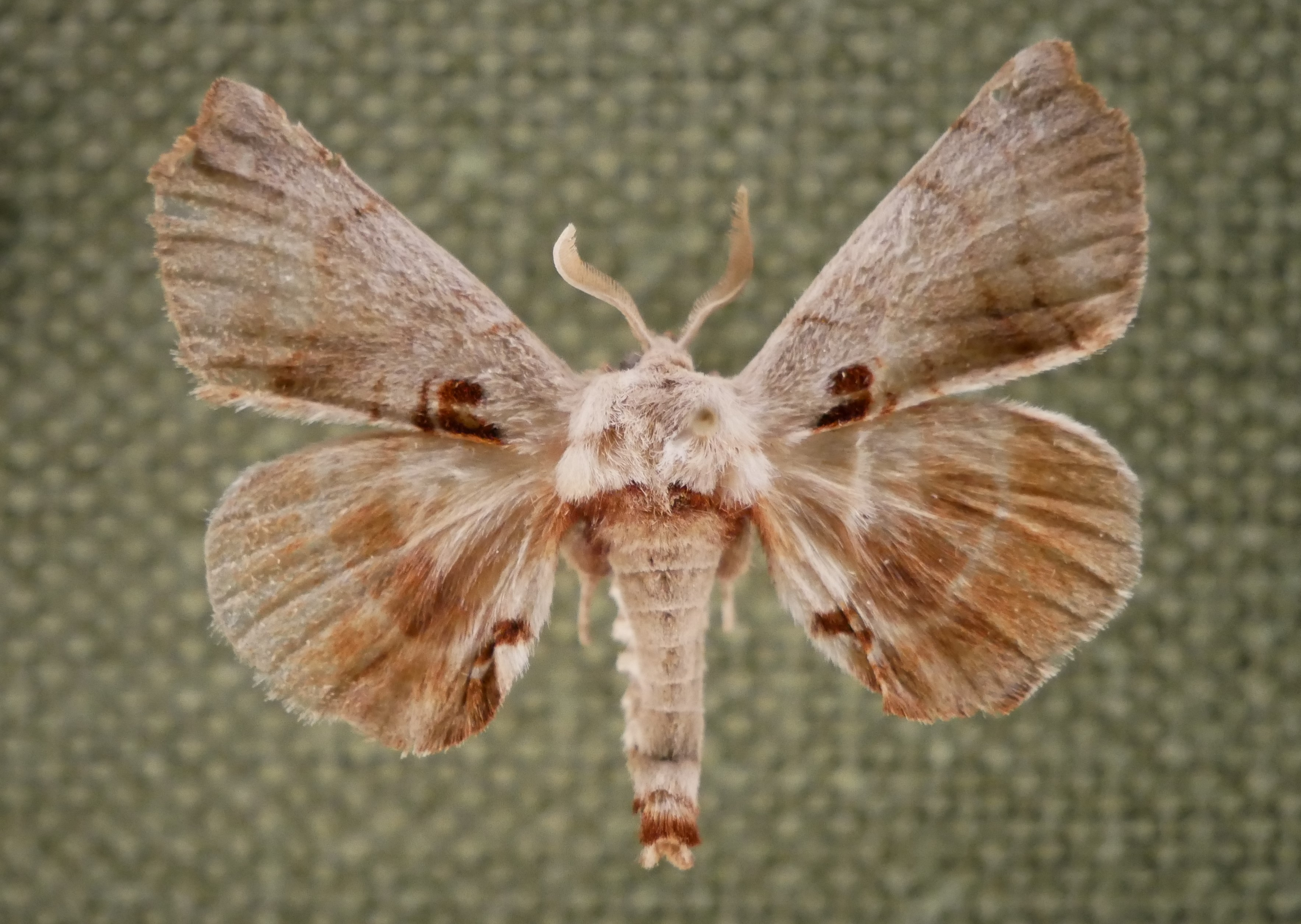
Museum Specimen
