= Apatelodes schreiteri =

Scientific classification
- Kingdom: Animalia
- Phylum: Arthropoda
- Clade: Pancrustacea
- Class: Insecta
- Order: Lepidoptera
- Family: Apatelodidae
- Genus: Apatelodes
- Species: A. schreiteri

Binomial name
- Apatelodes schreiteri Schaus, 1924

Synonyms
- Hygrochroa florisa; Apatelodes florisa Schaus, 1929

Species of moth

Apatelodes schreiteri is a moth in the family Apatelodidae. It is found in Argentina and Bolivia.
