= Tamphana praecipua =

Scientific classification
- Kingdom: Animalia
- Phylum: Arthropoda
- Class: Insecta
- Order: Lepidoptera
- Family: Bombycidae
- Genus: Tamphana
- Species: T. praecipua

Binomial name
- Tamphana praecipua Schaus, 1905

Species of moth

Tamphana praecipua is a moth in the Bombycidae family. It was described by Schaus in 1905. It is found in French Guiana.
