= Arotros =

Scientific classification
- Kingdom: Animalia
- Phylum: Arthropoda
- Clade: Pancrustacea
- Class: Insecta
- Order: Lepidoptera
- Family: Apatelodidae
- Genus: Arotros; Schaus, 1892

Genus of moths

Arotros is a genus of moths of the family Apatelodidae. It was first described by William Schaus in 1892 and species of the genus were formerly classified in the family Bombycidae.

== Species ==
The following species are recognised in the genus Arotros:

- Arotros bidentata
- Arotros colleti
- Arotros giustii
- Arotros moseri
- Arotros nozama
- Arotros striata
- Arotros tridentata
- Arotros vincenti
