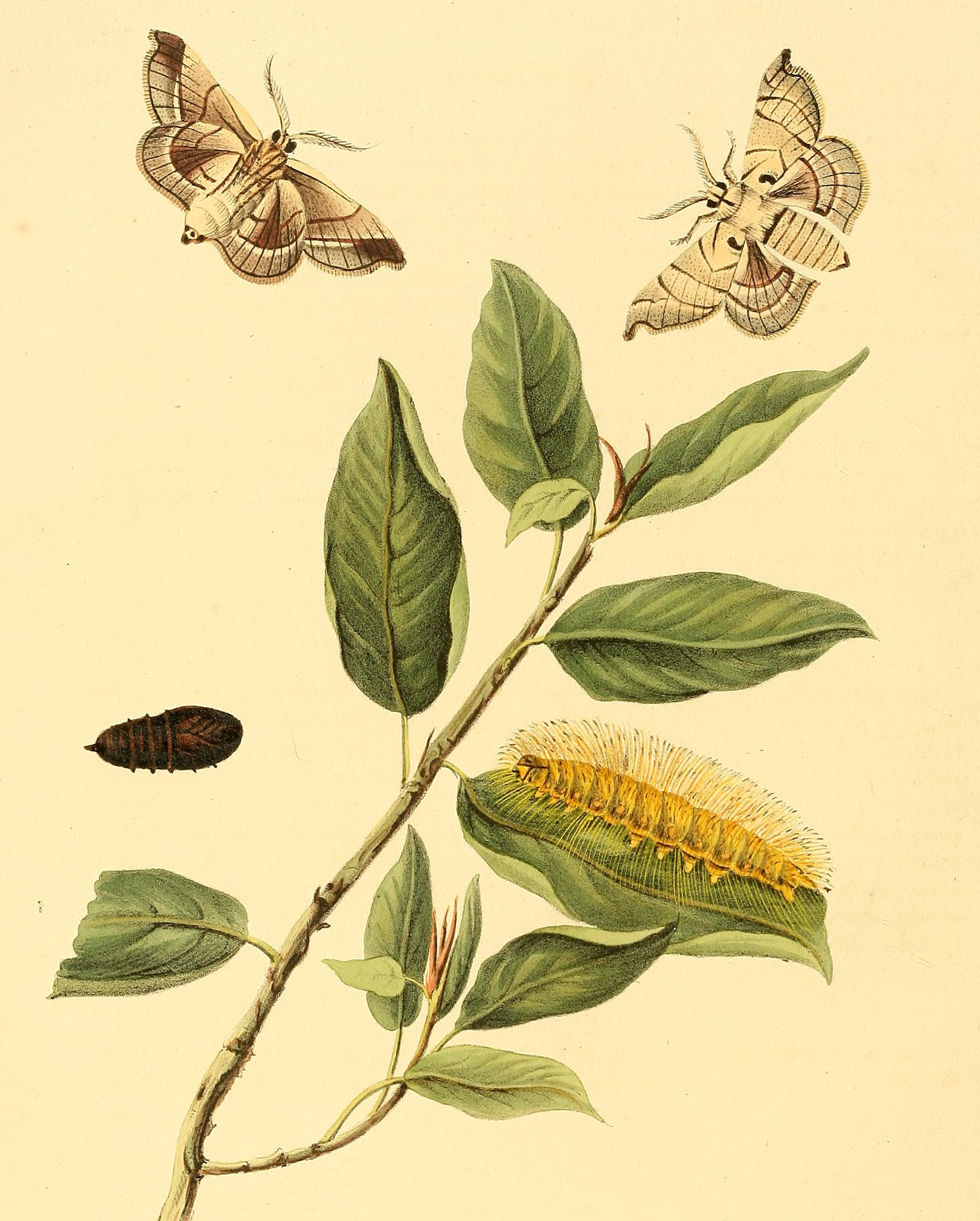

Scientific classification
- Kingdom: Animalia
- Phylum: Arthropoda
- Class: Insecta
- Order: Lepidoptera
- Family: Apatelodidae
- Genus: Apatelodes
- Species: A. firmiana

Binomial name
- Apatelodes firmiana (Stoll, [1782])

Synonyms
- Phalaena firmiana Stoll, [1782]

= Apatelodes firmiana =

Species of moth

Apatelodes firmiana is a moth in the family Apatelodidae first described by Caspar Stoll in 1782. It is found from Mexico to Guyana
