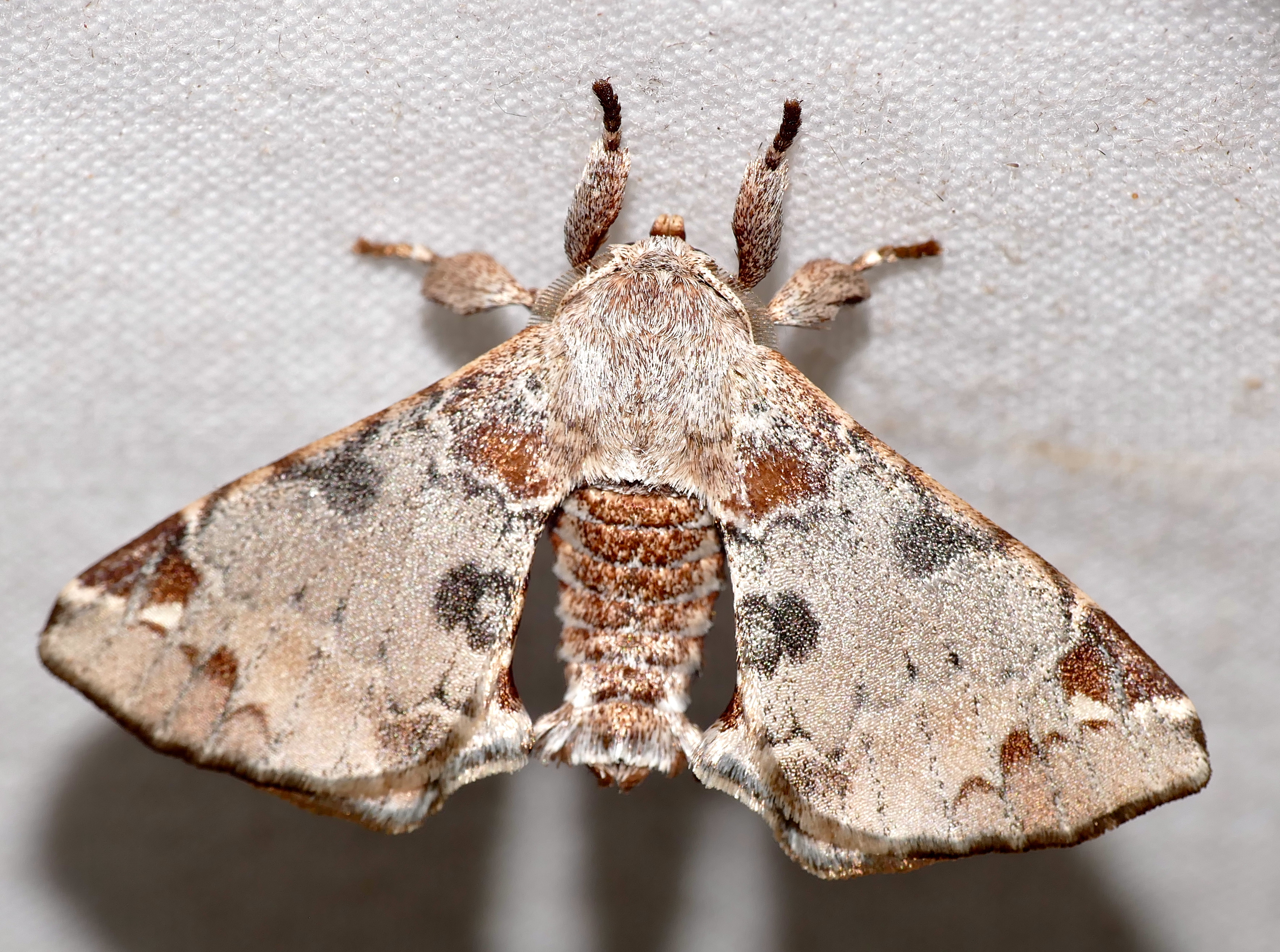
- Crastolliana nina

Scientific classification
- Kingdom: Animalia
- Phylum: Arthropoda
- Clade: Pancrustacea
- Class: Insecta
- Order: Lepidoptera
- Family: Apatelodidae
- Genus: Crastolliana; Herbin, 2024

Type species
- Phalaena nina Stoll, 1780

= Crastolliana =

Genus of moths

Crastolliana is a genus of moths in the family Apatelodidae, erected by Daniel Herbin in 2024. Species of the genus are found in the Neotropics.

== Species ==
- Crastolliana ardeola (Druce, 1887)
- Crastolliana belyiorum Herbin & Grados, 2024
- Crastolliana bonillai Herbin, 2024
- Crastolliana caucensis Herbin, 2024
- Crastolliana damora (Schaus, 1939)
- Crastolliana giulianae Giusti & Herbin, 2024
- Crastolliana gortovannyii Herbin, 2024
- Crastolliana inca Herbin & Grados, 2024
- Crastolliana johannesi Herbin, 2024
- Crastolliana kozlovi Herbin, 2024
- Crastolliana krutoae Herbin & Grados, 2024
- Crastolliana landryi Herbin, 2024
- Crastolliana mediana (Schaus, 1900)
- Crastolliana moresca (Schaus, 1905)
- Crastolliana nina (Stoll, [1780])
- Crastolliana otispa Herbin,2024
- Crastolliana patagai (Herbin, 2015)
- Crastolliana rodrougi (Herbin, 2022)
- Crastolliana steigeri Herbin, 2024
- Crastolliana xirma Herbin, 2024
