= Tamphana lojanara =

Scientific classification
- Kingdom: Animalia
- Phylum: Arthropoda
- Class: Insecta
- Order: Lepidoptera
- Family: Bombycidae
- Genus: Tamphana
- Species: T. lojanara

Binomial name
- Tamphana lojanara Schaus, 1929

Species of moth

Tamphana lojanara is a moth in the Bombycidae family. It was described by Schaus in 1929. It is found in Ecuador (Loja Province).
