= Pantelodes =

Scientific classification
- Domain: Eukaryota
- Kingdom: Animalia
- Phylum: Arthropoda
- Class: Insecta
- Order: Lepidoptera
- Family: Apatelodidae
- Genus: Pantelodes; Herbin, 2017

Genus of moths

Pantelodes is a genus of moths of the family Apatelodidae. It was first described by Daniel Herbin in 2017, containing at the time nine species: Pantelodes satellitia (transferred from Apatelodes) and eight newly described species previously identified as the former. In 2021, an additional species, Pantelodes camacana, was described. The distribution of the genus is Neotropical.

== Species ==
- Pantelodes amazonica Herbin, 2017
- Pantelodes boliviana Herbin, 2017
- Pantelodes camacana Orlandin & Carneiro, 2021
- Pantelodes centralamericana Herbin, 2017
- Pantelodes drechseli Herbin, 2017
- Pantelodes iracoubo Herbin, 2017
- Pantelodes maranhensis Herbin, 2017
- Pantelodes organabo Herbin, 2017
- Pantelodes ruschii Herbin, 2017
- Pantelodes satellitia (Walker, 1855)
