= Ibar =

Ibar may refer to:

== People ==
- Ibar of Beggerin (died 500), Irish saint
- Íbar of Killibar Beg, Irish saint
- Hilmi Ibar (born 1947), Kosovar academic
- José Ibar (born 1969), Cuban baseball player

== Places ==
- Ibar District, a division of the Serbian Grand Principality
- Ibar (river), in Kosovo, Montenegro, Serbia
- Ibar Reserve in Rila, Bulgaria
- Ibar Rocks, a rock formation in Antarctica
- Ibar Kolašin, in Kosovo
- Ibar Highway, in Serbia

== Other uses ==
- African Union Interafrican Bureau for Animal Resources (AU-IBAR)
- FK Ibar, a football club from Rožaje, Montenegro
- Olceclostera ibar, a moth in the family Bombycidae

== See also ==
- I-beam, a beam with an I- or H-shaped cross-section used for structural support in the construction industry
