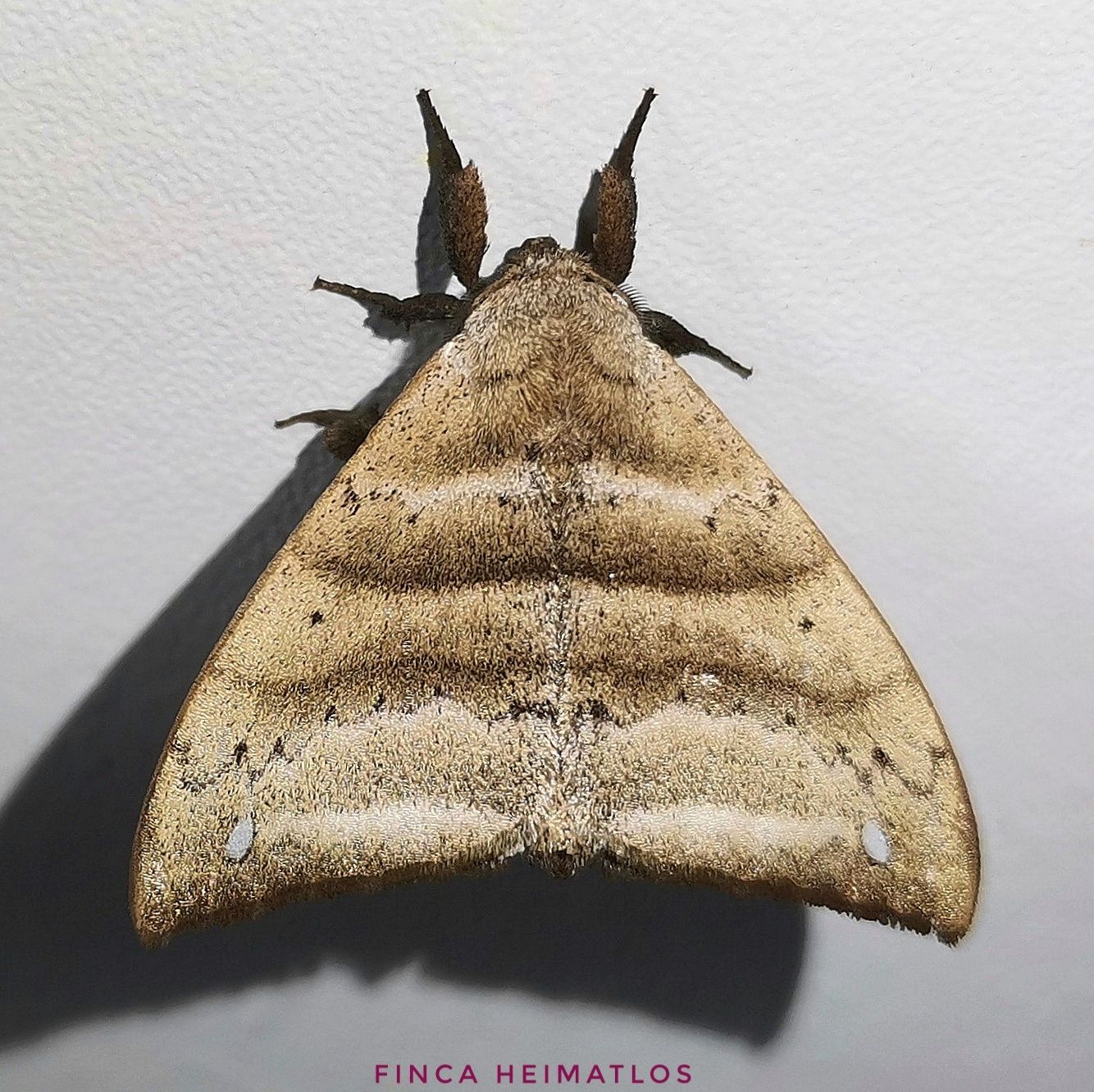
- Falcatelodes anava

Scientific classification
- Kingdom: Animalia
- Phylum: Arthropoda
- Clade: Pancrustacea
- Class: Insecta
- Order: Lepidoptera
- Family: Apatelodidae
- Genus: Falcatelodes; Draudt, 1929

= Falcatelodes =

Genus of moths

Falcatelodes is a genus of moths in the family Apatelodidae that was erected by Max Wilhelm Karl Draudt in 1929.

== Species ==
Two species are recognised in the genus Falcatelodes:

- Falcatelodes anava (Druce, 1890)
- Falcatelodes oriunda (Schaus, 1905)
