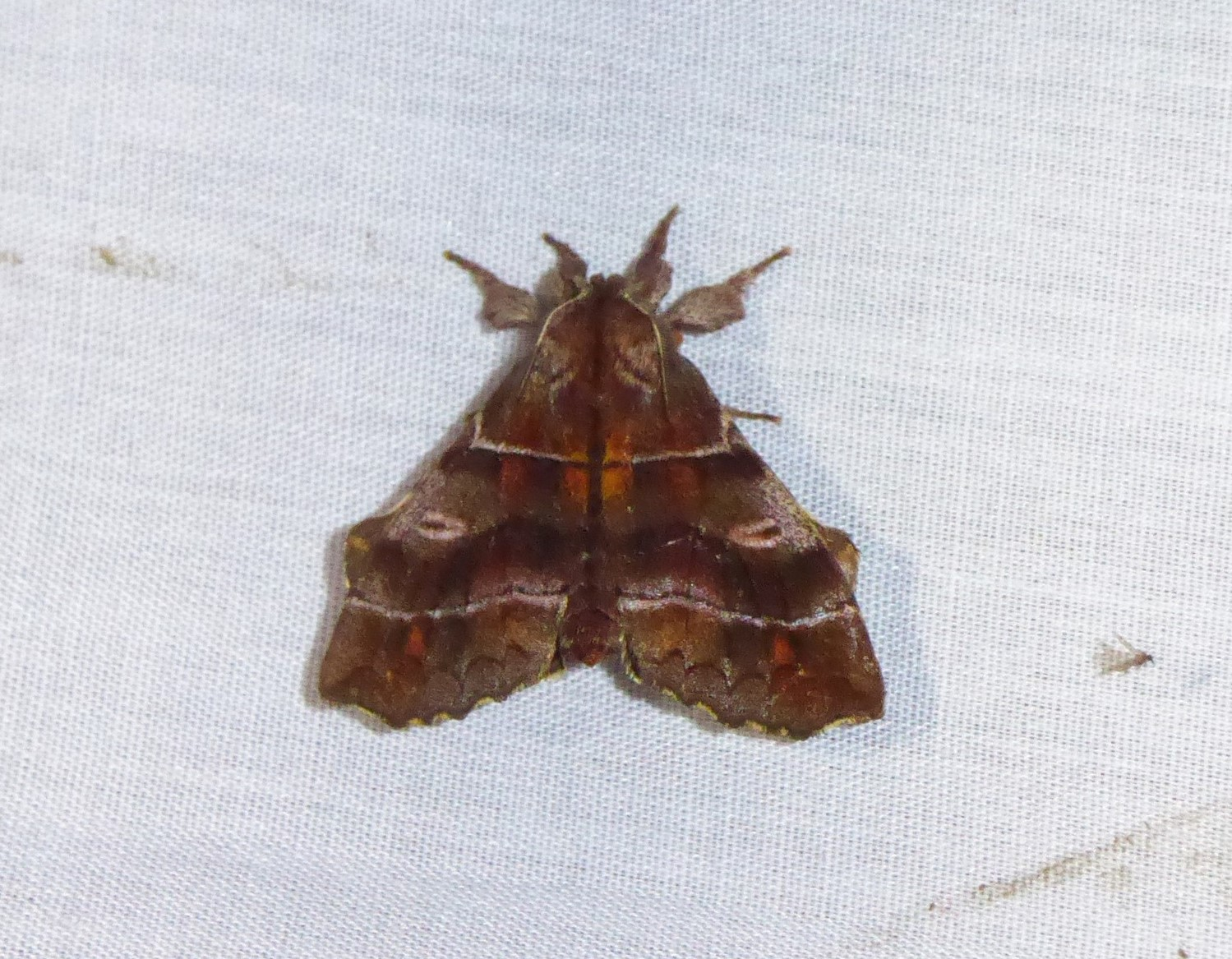

Scientific classification
- Kingdom: Animalia
- Phylum: Arthropoda
- Clade: Pancrustacea
- Class: Insecta
- Order: Lepidoptera
- Family: Apatelodidae
- Genus: Zanola; Walker, 1855

Synonyms
- Dorisia Möschler, 1883

= Zanola =

Genus of moths

Zanola is a genus of moths in the family Apatelodidae.

== Species ==
The following species are recognised in the genus Zanola:

- Zanola elongata Schaus, 1910
- Zanola hezia (Druce, 1899)
- Zanola lychnica Dognin, 1920
- Zanola poecila Draudt, 1929
- Zanola verago (Cramer, 1777)
- Zanola vivax (H. Edwards, 1884
