= Ephoria =

Ephoria may refer to:

- Ephoria (moth) Herrich-Schäffer, 1855, a genus of moths of the family Apatelodidae
- Ephoria Meyrick, 1892, a taxonymic synonym for Epholca, a genus of moths in the family Geometridae.
- An archaeological administrative district in Greece, overseen by an Ephor (archaeology)
