= Tamphana inferna =

Scientific classification
- Kingdom: Animalia
- Phylum: Arthropoda
- Class: Insecta
- Order: Lepidoptera
- Family: Bombycidae
- Genus: Tamphana
- Species: T. inferna

Binomial name
- Tamphana inferna Dognin, 1916

Species of moth

Tamphana inferna is a moth in the Bombycidae family. It was described by Paul Dognin in 1916. It is found in South America. The type location is Goldsberg.
