= Drepatelodes =

Scientific classification
- Kingdom: Animalia
- Phylum: Arthropoda
- Clade: Pancrustacea
- Class: Insecta
- Order: Lepidoptera
- Family: Apatelodidae
- Genus: Drepatelodes; Draudt, 1929

Genus of moths

Drepatelodes is a genus of moths of the family Apatelodidae.

== Species ==
Drepatelodes contains the following species:(after).

- Drepatelodes decaensi Herbin, 2024
- Drepatelodes friburgensis (Schaus, 1924)
- Drepatelodes hermieri Herbin, 2024
- Drepatelodes inexpectata Herbin, 2024
- Drepatelodes ostenta (Schaus, 1905)
- Drepatelodes parallela Herbin, 2024
- Drepatelodes quadrilineata (Schaus, 1920)
- Drepatelodes tanais (Druce, 1898)
- Drepatelodes trilineata (Dognin, 1912)
- Drepatelodes umbrillinea (Schaus, 1905)
- Drepatelodes zacki Herbin & Monzón, 2015
