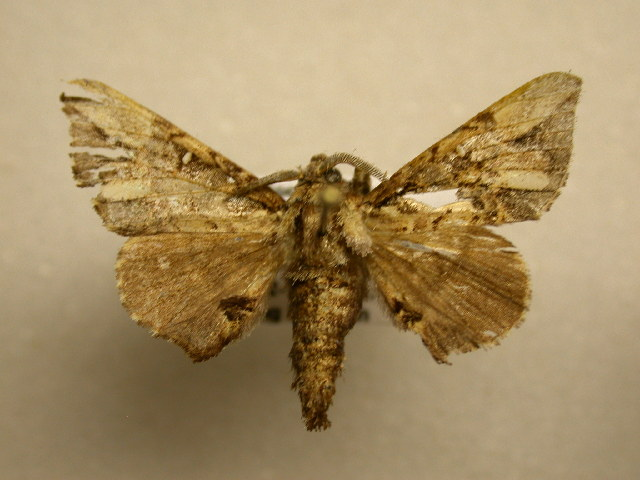
- Tamphana marmorea

Scientific classification
- Kingdom: Animalia
- Phylum: Arthropoda
- Clade: Pancrustacea
- Class: Insecta
- Order: Lepidoptera
- Family: Apatelodidae
- Genus: Tamphana; Schaus, 1892

= Tamphana =

Genus of moths

Tamphana is a genus of moths in the family Apatelodidae.

== Species ==
The following species are recognised in the genus Tamphana:

- Tamphana inferna Dognin, 1916
- Tamphana lojanara Schaus, 1929
- Tamphana marmorea Schaus, 1892
- Tamphana praecipua Schaus, 1905
