= Olceclostera ibar =

Scientific classification
- Domain: Eukaryota
- Kingdom: Animalia
- Phylum: Arthropoda
- Class: Insecta
- Order: Lepidoptera
- Family: Apatelodidae
- Genus: Olceclostera
- Species: O. ibar

Binomial name
- Olceclostera ibar (Schaus, 1927)

Synonyms
- Apatelodes ibar Schaus, 1927

Species of moth

Olceclostera ibar is a moth in the Apatelodidae family. It is found in Argentina.

The wingspan is about 29 mm. The forewings are light drab, suffused with light greyish olive. The hindwings are light cinnamon drab.
