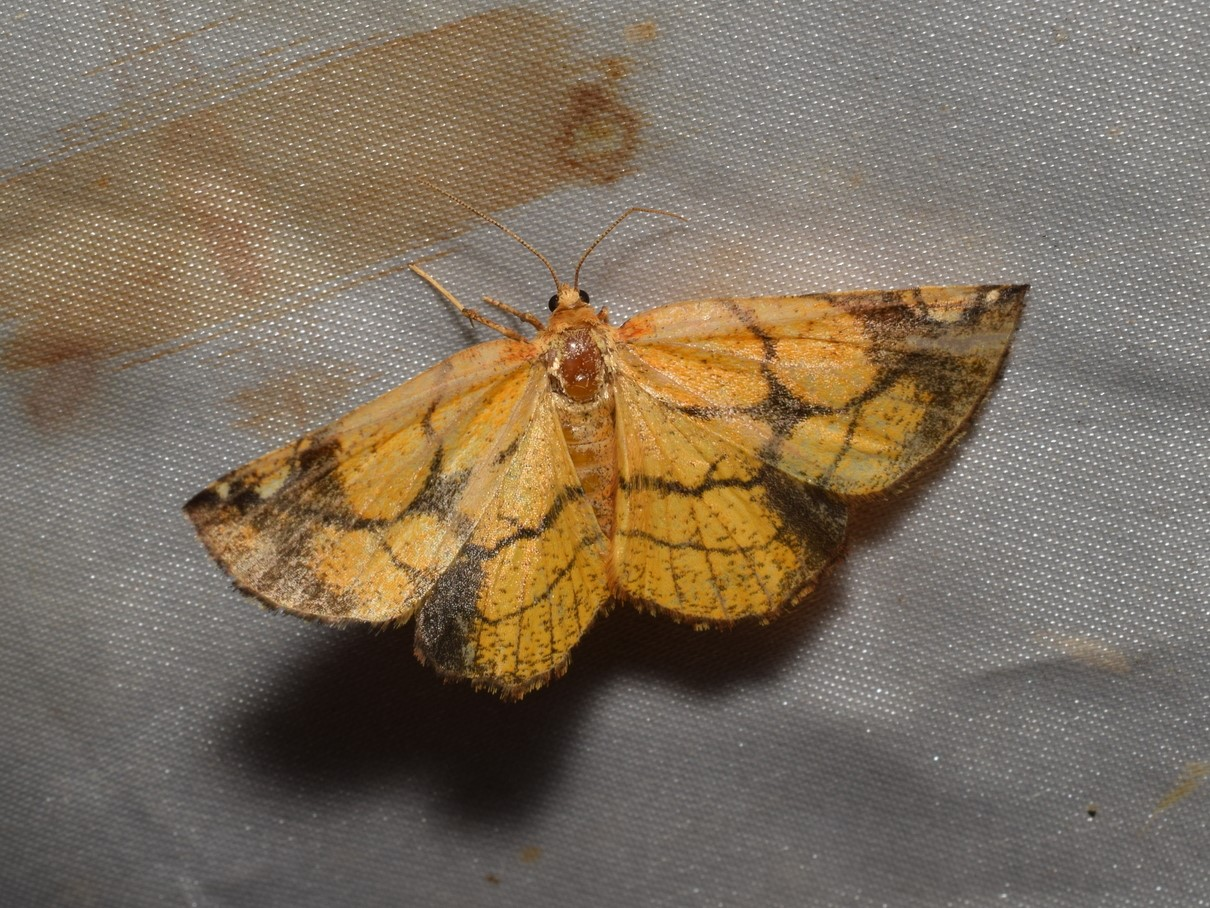
- Epholca arenosa

Scientific classification
- Kingdom: Animalia
- Phylum: Arthropoda
- Clade: Pancrustacea
- Class: Insecta
- Order: Lepidoptera
- Family: Geometridae
- Genus: Epholca; D. S. Fletcher, 1979

Synonyms
- Ephoria Meyrick, 1892

= Epholca =

Genus of moths

Epholca is a genus of moths in the family Geometridae. It was described by David Stephen Fletcher in 1979.

== Species ==
The following species are recognised in the genus Epholca:

- Epholca arenosa (Butler, 1878)
- Epholca auratilis (Prout, 1934)
- Epholca fractisriga (Alphéraky, 1892)
