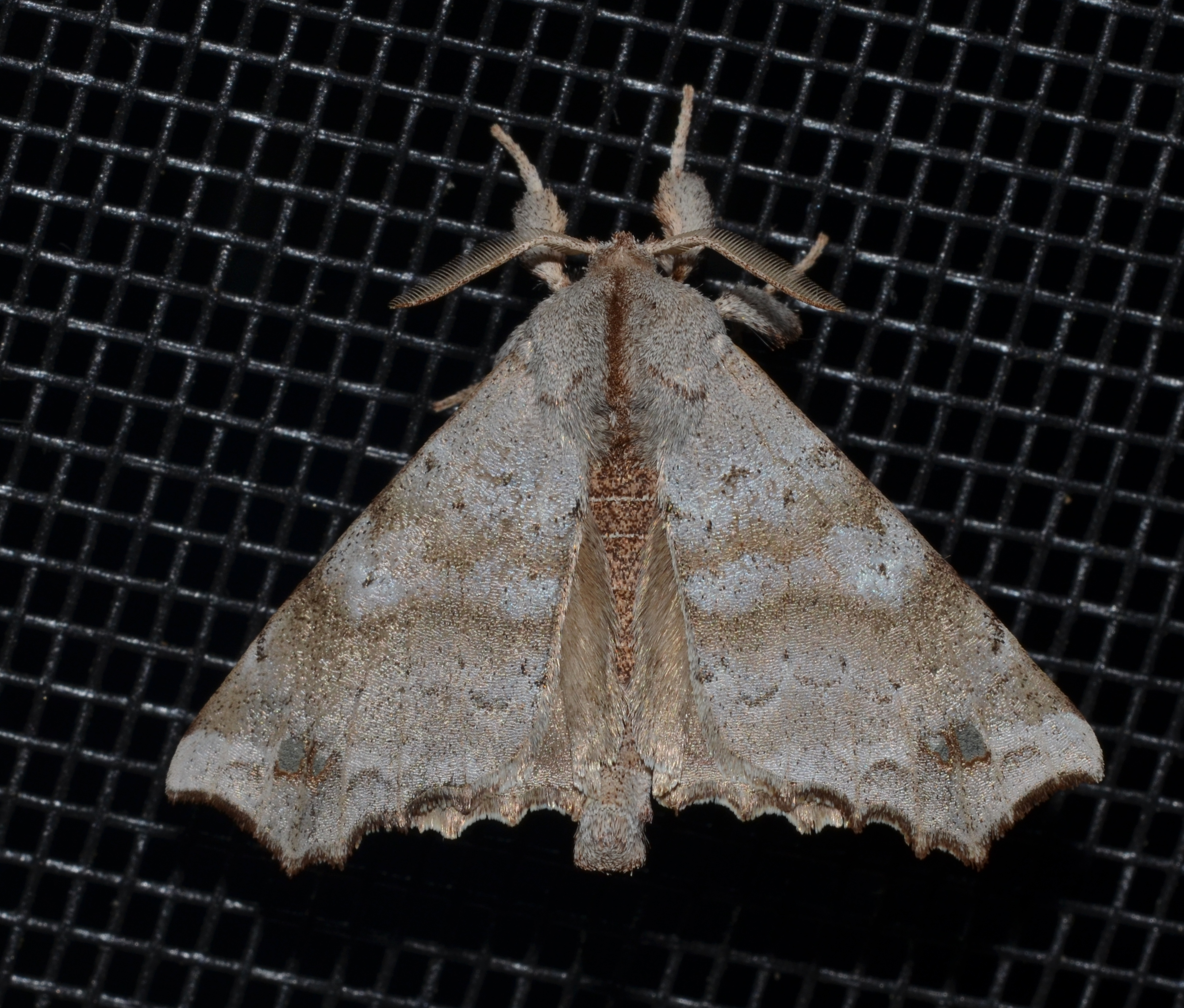
- Angel Moth (Olceclostera angelica)

Scientific classification
- Kingdom: Animalia
- Phylum: Arthropoda
- Clade: Pancrustacea
- Class: Insecta
- Order: Lepidoptera
- Family: Apatelodidae
- Genus: Olceclostera; Butler, 1878

= Olceclostera =

Genus of moths

Olceclostera is a genus of moths of the family Apatelodidae.

== Species ==
The following species are recognised in the genus Olceclostera:

- Olceclostera amelda Dyar, 1915
- Olceclostera amoria Druce, 1890
- Olceclostera angelica (Grote, 1864)
- Olceclostera avangareza Schaus, 1910
- Olceclostera azteca Schaus, 1894
- Olceclostera bifenestrata Schaus, 1912
- Olceclostera bilinea Schaus, 1900
- Olceclostera brama Schaus, 1920
- Olceclostera castrona Schaus, 1894
- Olceclostera cuyabata Draudt, 1929
- Olceclostera eburnea Herbin, 2018
- Olceclostera ibar (Schaus, 1927)
- Olceclostera indentata Schaus, 1910
- Olceclostera interniplaga Draudt, 1929
- Olceclostera irrorata (Butler, 1878)
- Olceclostera jairana Orlandin & Piovesan, 2023
- Olceclostera lepida Schaus, 1905
- Olceclostera leticiensis Herbin, 2021
- Olceclostera magniplaga Schaus, 1910
- Olceclostera maya Schaus, 1892
- Olceclostera microps (Walker, 1855)
- Olceclostera mutusca Schaus, 1892
- Olceclostera nigripuncta Schaus, 1910
- Olceclostera porioni Herbin & Mielke, 2018
- Olceclostera quilombola Orlandin, Piovesan & Carneiro, 2023
- Olceclostera reperta (Walker, 1865)
- Olceclostera seraphica (Dyar, 1906)
- Olceclostera tropea (Schaus, 1896)
- Olceclostera truncata (Walker, 1855)
- Olceclostera truvena (Schaus, 1896)
- Olceclostera wayana Herbin, Orlandin & Carneiro, 2023
- Olceclostera xeta Orlandin, Herbin & Carneiro, 2023
