= Thelosia =

Scientific classification
- Kingdom: Animalia
- Phylum: Arthropoda
- Clade: Pancrustacea
- Class: Insecta
- Order: Lepidoptera
- Family: Apatelodidae
- Genus: Thelosia; Schaus, 1896

Genus of moths

Thelosia is a genus of moths of the family Apatelodidae. It was first described in 1896 by William Schaus, containing at the time three species: Thelosia phalaena, T. camina and T. truvena. Since then, several additional species have been described.

== Species ==
The following species are recognised in the genus Thelosia:

- Thelosia camina Schaus, 1896
- Thelosia olaus (Schaus, 1924)
- Thelosia paulista (Jones, 1908)
- Thelosia phalaena Schaus, 1896
- Thelosia postflavida Draudt, 1929
- Thelosia signata (Druce, 1904)
