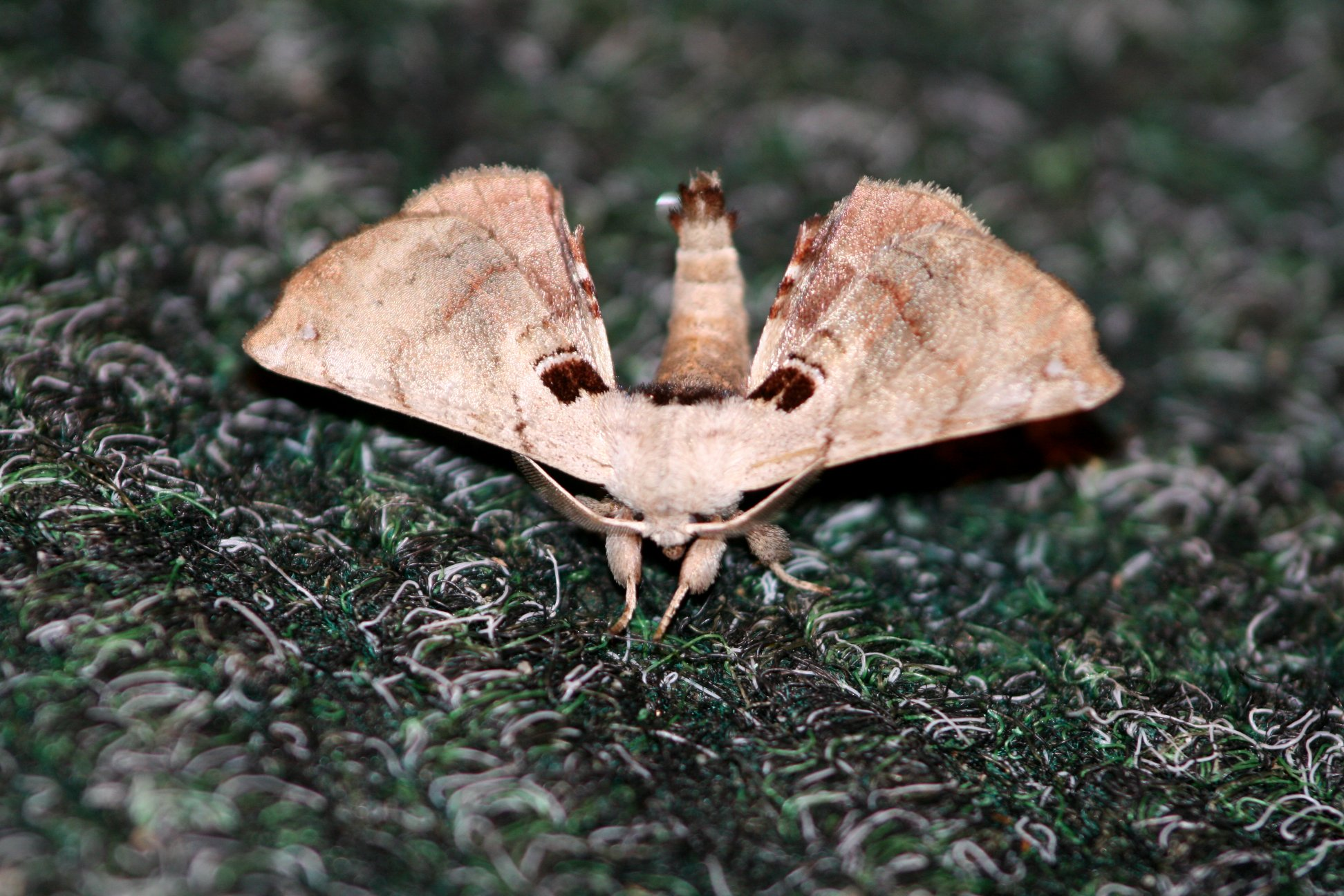
- Apatelodes torrefacta

Scientific classification
- Kingdom: Animalia
- Phylum: Arthropoda
- Clade: Pancrustacea
- Class: Insecta
- Order: Lepidoptera
- Superfamily: Bombycoidea
- Family: Apatelodidae; Neumoegen & Dyar, 1894

Synonyms
- Zanolidae Draudt & Schaus, 1929; Apatelodinae

= Apatelodidae =

Family of moths

Apatelodidae, the American silkworm moths, is a family of insects in the order Lepidoptera. They are a family within the superfamily Bombycoidea, though they have in the past been considered a subfamily of the family Bombycidae.

== Distribution ==
Species are found exclusively in the New World, with the highest diversity in the Neotropical realm.

== Diversity ==
Apatelodidae is undergoing taxonomic and phylogenetic revision, as a result of which the exact numbers of genera and species included have been subject to frequent change. "A global checklist of the Bombycoidea" (Kitching et al. 2018) lists twelve genera and 182 species for the family.

Not included in the checklist are taxonomic changes that occurred shortly before, or since, publication. Some examples of such changes are the addition of genera Arotros (transferred from Bombycidae in 2019) and Asocia (newly described in 2021) to Apatelodidae, the synonymization of Apatelodes florisa to Apatelodes schreiteri, or the description of several new species such as Apatelodes navarroi, Pantelodes camacana, and seven new species of Arotros.

== Taxonomy ==
Apatelodidae has historically been placed as subfamily Apatelodinae within the Bombycidae, alongside Phiditiinae and Epiinae. Recent revisions of the taxonomy of Bombycoidea have seen both Apatelodidae and Phiditiidae elevated to separate families within the superfamily, while Epiinae remains a subfamily of Bombycidae. During those taxonomical revisions, several genera formerly placed in Apatelodinae—such as Anticla and Quentalia—were transferred to Epiinae.

=== Genera ===
The following genera are recognised in the family Apatelodidae:

- Apatelodes Packard, 1864
- Arotros Schaus, 1892
- Asocia Herbin, 2021
- Aymara Orlandin, Piovesan & Carneiro, 2024
- Campesina Orlandin, Piovesan & Carneiro, 2024
- Caribas Orlandin, Piovesan & Carneiro, 2024
- Carnotena Walker, 1865
- Cecile Orlandin, Piovesan & Carneiro, 2024
- Crastolliana Herbin, 2024
- Drepatelodes Draudt, 1929
- Ephoria Herring-Schäffer, 1855
- Falcatelodes Draudt, 1929
- Hygrochroa Hübner, [1823]
- Kaweskar Orlandin, Piovesan & Carneiro, 2024
- Lempira Orlandin, Piovesan & Carneiro, 2024
- Misak Orlandin, Piovesan & Carneiro, 2024
- Mocambo Orlandin, Piovesan & Carneiro, 2024
- Nhanderu Orlandin, Piovesan & Carneiro, 2024
- Olceclostera Butler, 1878
- Pantelodes Herbin, 2017
- Peabiru Orlandin, Piovesan & Carneiro, 2024
- Prothysana Walker, 1855
- Raoni Orlandin, Piovesan & Carneiro, 2024
- Tamphana Schaus, 1892
- Tapuia Orlandin, Piovesan & Carneiro, 2024
- Thelosia Schaus, 1896
- Thyrioclostera Draudt, 1929
- Tibira Orlandin, Piovesan & Carneiro, 2024
- Tupac Orlandin, Piovesan & Carneiro, 2024
- Tuyvae Orlandin, Piovesan & Carneiro, 2024
- Zanola Walker, 1855
- Zapata Orlandin, Piovesan & Carneiro, 2024
