= List of moths of Canada (Drepanidae) =

Partial list of Canadian moths

This is a list of the moths of family Drepanidae that are found in Canada. It also acts as an index to the species articles and forms part of the full List of moths of Canada.

Following the species name, there is an abbreviation that indicates the Canadian provinces or territories in which the species can be found.

- Western Canada
  - BC = British Columbia
  - AB = Alberta
  - SK = Saskatchewan
  - MB = Manitoba
  - YT = Yukon
  - NT = Northwest Territories
  - NU = Nunavut
- Eastern Canada
  - ON = Ontario
  - QC = Quebec
  - NB = New Brunswick
  - NS = Nova Scotia
  - PE = Prince Edward Island
  - NF = Newfoundland
  - LB = Labrador

== Subfamily Drepaninae ==
- Drepana arcuata Walker, 1855 -NF, LB, NS, PE, NB, QC, ON, MB, SK, AB, BC, NT
- Drepana bilineata (Packard, 1864) -NF, NS, PE, NB, QC, ON, MB, SK, AB, BC
- Eudeilinia herminiata (Guenée, [1858]) -NF, NS, PE, NB, QC, ON, MB, SK, AB, BC
- Oreta rosea (Walker, 1855) -NF, NS, PE, NB, QC, ON, MB, SK, AB, BC

== Subfamily Thyatirinae ==
- Ceranemota albertae Clarke, 1938 -SK, AB, BC
- Ceranemota fasciata (Barnes & McDunnough, 1910)- BC
- Ceranemota improvisa (Edwards, 1873) -BC
- Habrosyne gloriosa (Guenée, 1852) -QC, ON
- Habrosyne scripta (Gosse, 1840) -NF, LB, NS, PE, NB, QC, ON, MB, SK, AB, BC
- Pseudothyatira cymatophoroides (Guenée, 1852) -NF, LB, NS, NB, QC, ON, MB, SK, AB, BC
- Euthyatira pudens (Guenée, 1852) -NB, QC, ON, MB, SK, AB, BC
- Euthyatira semicircularis (Grote, 1881) -BC
