= List of moths of Canada (Saturniidae) =

Partial list of Canadian moths

This is a list of the moths of family Saturniidae that are found in Canada. It also acts as an index to the species articles and forms part of the full List of moths of Canada.

Following the species name, there is an abbreviation that indicates the Canadian provinces or territories in which the species can be found.

- Western Canada
  - BC = British Columbia
  - AB = Alberta
  - SK = Saskatchewan
  - MB = Manitoba
  - YT = Yukon
  - NT = Northwest Territories
  - NU = Nunavut
- Eastern Canada
  - ON = Ontario
  - QC = Quebec
  - NB = New Brunswick
  - NS = Nova Scotia
  - PE = Prince Edward Island
  - NF = Newfoundland
  - LB = Labrador

== Subfamily Ceratocampinae ==
- Anisota finlaysoni Riotte, 1969-QC, ON
- Anisota manitobensis McDunnough, 1921-MB
- Anisota senatoria (Smith, 1797)-QC, ON
- Anisota stigma (Fabricius, 1775)-ON
- Anisota virginiensis (Drury, 1773)-NS, PE, NB, QC, ON, MB
- Dryocampa rubicunda (Fabricius, 1793)-NS, PE, NB, QC, ON
- Eacles imperialis (Drury, 1773)-QC, ON
- Syssphinx bicolor (Harris, 1841)-ON

== Subfamily Hemileucinae ==
- Automeris io (Fabricius, 1775)-QC, ON, MB
- Hemileuca eglanterina (Boisduval, 1852)-AB, BC
- Hemileuca hera (Harris, 1841)-SK, AB, BC
- Hemileuca nevadensis Stretch, 1872-MB, SK
- Hemileuca nuttalli (Strecker, 1875)-BC

== Subfamily Saturniinae ==
- Callosamia angulifera (Walker, 1855)-ON
- Callosamia promethea (Drury, 1773)-NB, QC, ON, MB
- Hyalophora cecropia (Linnaeus, 1758)-NS, PE, NB, QC, ON, MB, SK, AB
- Hyalophora columbia (Smith, 1865)-NS, PE, NB, QC, ON, MB, SK, AB, BC
- Hyalophora euryalus (Boisduval, 1855)-BC
- Samia cynthia (Drury, 1773)-ON
- Actias luna (Linnaeus, 1758)-NS, PE, NB, QC, ON, MB, SK
- Antheraea polyphemus (Cramer, 1776)-NS, PE, NB, QC, ON, MB, SK, AB, BC
