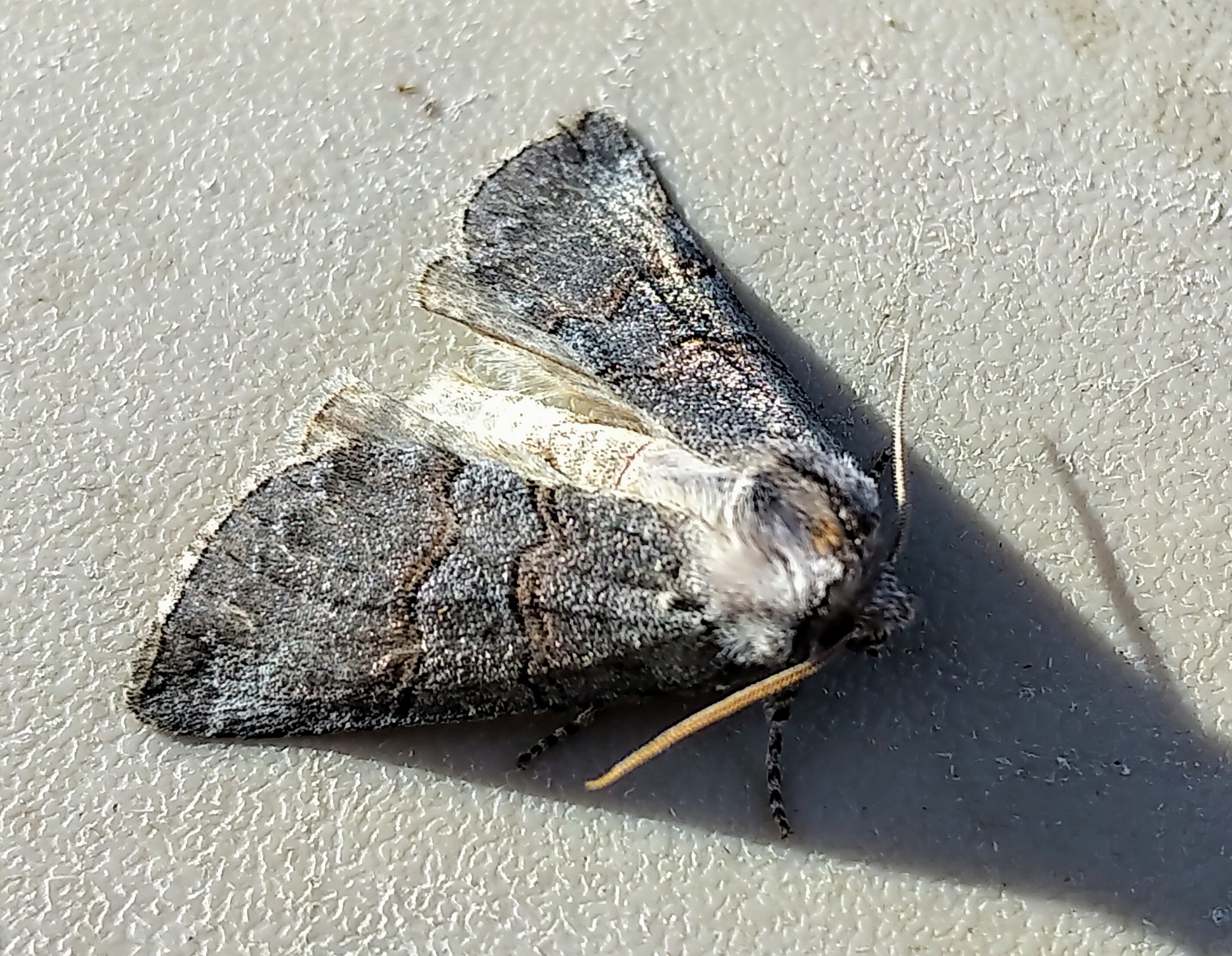

Scientific classification
- Domain: Eukaryota
- Kingdom: Animalia
- Phylum: Arthropoda
- Class: Insecta
- Order: Lepidoptera
- Family: Drepanidae
- Genus: Ceranemota
- Species: C. albertae

Binomial name
- Ceranemota albertae J. F. G. Clarke, 1938

= Ceranemota albertae =

Species of false owlet moth

Ceranemota albertae, commonly known as the Alberta lutestring, is a species of moth in the family Drepanidae that was first described by John Frederick Gates Clarke in 1938. It is found in western Canada, from south-central British Columbia east to south-eastern Saskatchewan. The habitat consists of dry open woodlands and shrub areas with wild cherry.

The wingspan is 32–39 mm. Adults are similar to Ceranemota tearlei and Ceranemota partida, but are darker and more silvery. Adults are on wing from August to September depending on the location.
