= Prionia =

Prionia may refer to:

- Prionia, Grevena, an Aromanian village in Greece
- Prionia (moth), a synonym of the moth genus Falcaria
