= Falcaria =

Falcaria may refer to:

- Falcaria (moth), an animal genus in the family Drepanidae
- Falcaria (plant), a plant genus in the family Apiaceae
