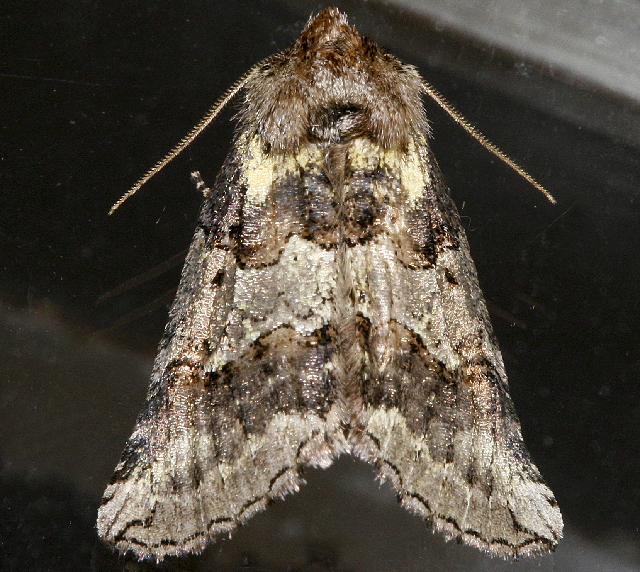
- Ceranemota improvisa

Scientific classification
- Domain: Eukaryota
- Kingdom: Animalia
- Phylum: Arthropoda
- Class: Insecta
- Order: Lepidoptera
- Family: Drepanidae
- Subfamily: Thyatirinae
- Genus: Ceranemota; Clarke, 1938

= Ceranemota =

Moth genus in family Drepanidae

Ceranemota is a genus of moths belonging to the subfamily Thyatirinae of the Drepanidae.

== Species ==
- Ceranemota improvisa Edwards, 1873
- Ceranemota fasciata Barnes & McDunnough, 1910
- Ceranemota crumbi Benjamin, 1938
- Ceranemota semifasciata Benjamin, 1938
- Ceranemota tearlei Edwards, 1888
- Ceranemota partida Clarke, 1938
- Ceranemota albertae Clarke, 1938
- Ceranemota amplifascia Clarke, 1938
