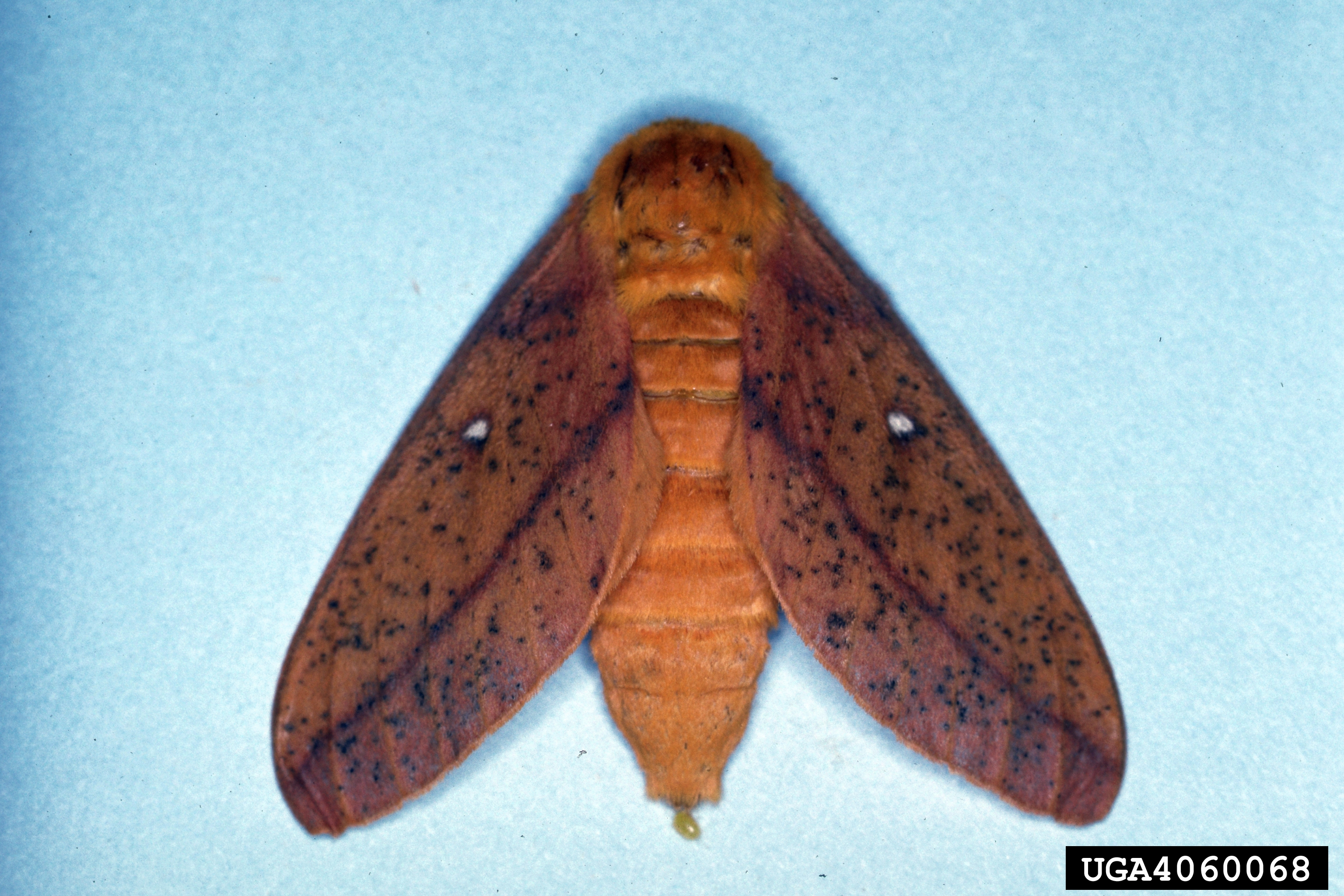

Scientific classification
- Kingdom: Animalia
- Phylum: Arthropoda
- Class: Insecta
- Order: Lepidoptera
- Family: Saturniidae
- Genus: Anisota
- Species: A. peigleri

Binomial name
- Anisota peigleri Riotte, 1975

= Anisota peigleri =

Species of moth

Anisota peigleri, the yellowstriped oakworm, is a moth of the family Saturniidae. The species was first described by Jules C. E. Riotte in 1975. It is found in the United States from south-eastern Kentucky, south-western Virginia, eastern Tennessee and western North Carolina south through western South Carolina and central Georgia through central Alabama into north-central Florida.

It was described as a species in 1975 and is similar to and was previously identified as Anisota senatoria (J.E. Smith, 1797).

The wingspan is 43–69 mm. Adults are on wing from mid July to late August in one generation. Adults are on wing during the day. Mating takes place from midmorning until midafternoon.

The larvae mainly feed on various oak species, including Quercus palustris. They feed in tight groups throughout their development. Fully grown caterpillars pupate and overwinter in shallow underground chambers. Adults do not feed.
