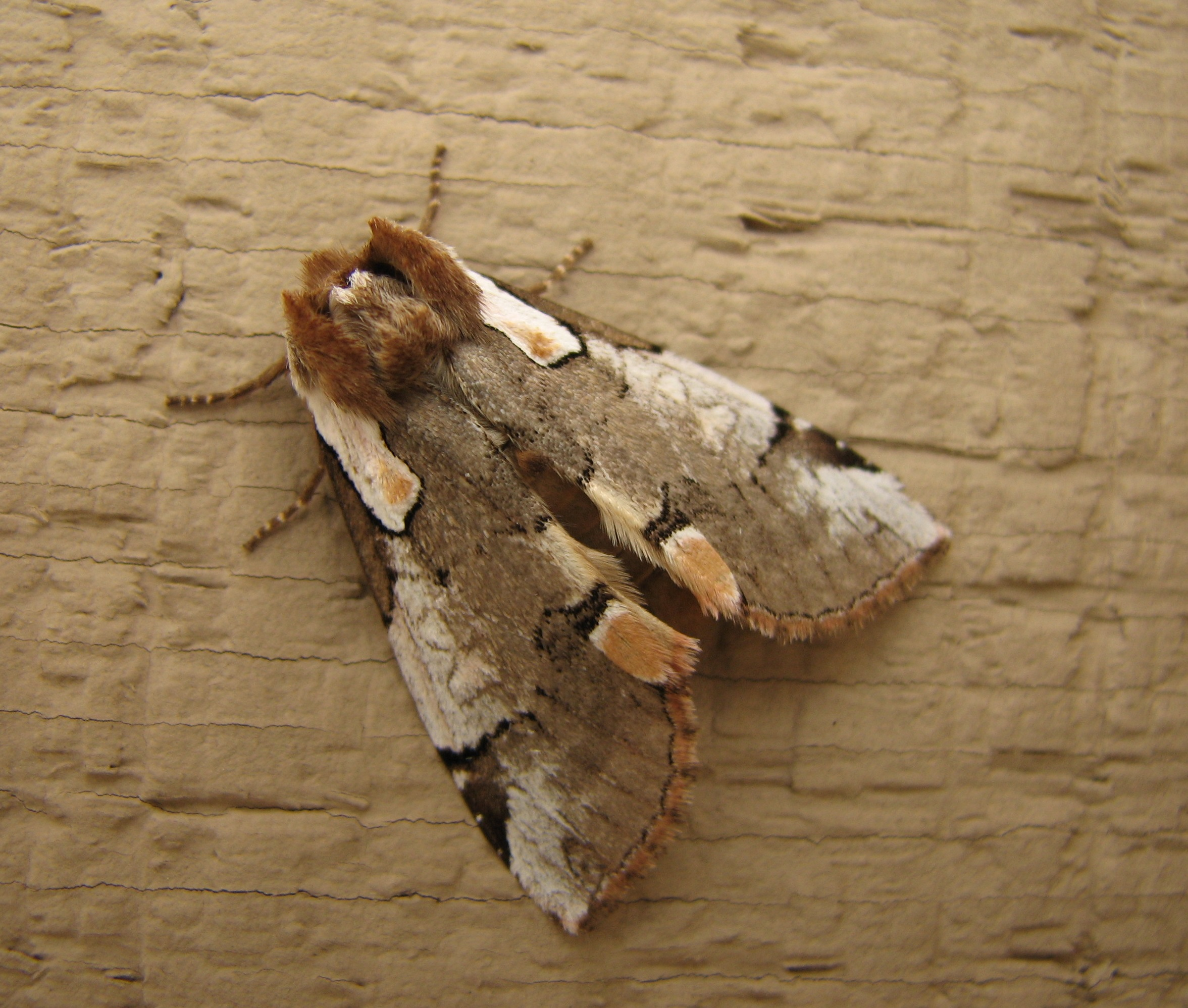

Scientific classification
- Kingdom: Animalia
- Phylum: Arthropoda
- Class: Insecta
- Order: Lepidoptera
- Family: Drepanidae
- Genus: Euthyatira
- Species: E. lorata

Binomial name
- Euthyatira lorata (Grote, 1881)

Synonyms
- Thyatira lorata Grote, 1881

= Euthyatira lorata =

Species of false owlet moth

Euthyatira lorata is a moth of the family Drepanidae. It is found in wet coastal forests in north-western North America, including Oregon and Washington.

The wingspan is about 44 mm. Adults are on wing from spring to early summer.

The larvae feed on the foliage of dogwoods (Cornus species).
