= Ceranemota semifasciata =

Scientific classification
- Domain: Eukaryota
- Kingdom: Animalia
- Phylum: Arthropoda
- Class: Insecta
- Order: Lepidoptera
- Family: Drepanidae
- Genus: Ceranemota
- Species: C. semifasciata

Binomial name
- Ceranemota semifasciata Benjamin, 1938

Species of false owlet moth

Ceranemota semifasciata is a moth in the family Drepanidae. It was described by Foster Hendrickson Benjamin in 1938. It is found in North America, where it has been recorded from northern California.
