= Euthyatira pryeri =

Scientific classification
- Domain: Eukaryota
- Kingdom: Animalia
- Phylum: Arthropoda
- Class: Insecta
- Order: Lepidoptera
- Family: Drepanidae
- Genus: Euthyatira
- Species: E. pryeri

Binomial name
- Euthyatira pryeri (Butler, 1881)

Synonyms
- Thyatira pryeri Butler, 1881; Monothyatira pryeri

Species of false owlet moth

Euthyatira pryeri is a moth in the family Drepanidae. It is found in Japan and possibly Shaanxi, China.
