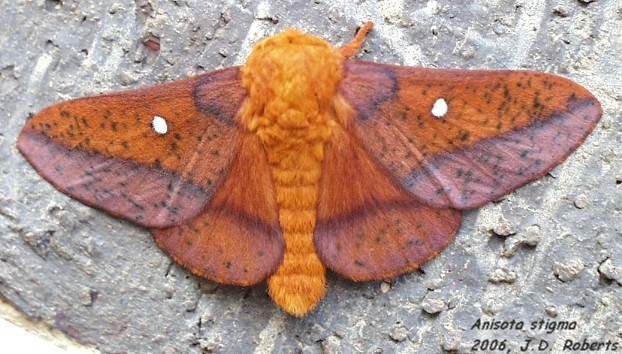
- Anisota stigma

Scientific classification
- Domain: Eukaryota
- Kingdom: Animalia
- Phylum: Arthropoda
- Class: Insecta
- Order: Lepidoptera
- Family: Saturniidae
- Subfamily: Ceratocampinae
- Genus: Anisota; Hübner, [1820]

Synonyms
- Adelocephala Duponchel, 1841; Adelocampa Packard, 1905

= Anisota =

Genus of moths

Anisota is a genus of moths in the family Saturniidae first described by Jacob Hübner in 1820. Their caterpillars are known commonly as oakworms. They are defoliators of oaks.

== Species ==
- Anisota assimilis (Druce, 1886)
- Anisota consularis Dryar, 1896
- Anisota dissimilis (Boisduval, 1872)
- Anisota finlaysoni Riotte, 1969
- Anisota kendallorum Lemaire, 1988
- Anisota leucostygma (Boisduval, 1872)
- Anisota manitobensis McDunnough, 1921
- Anisota oslari Rothschild, 1907 - Oslar's oakworm moth
- Anisota peigleri Riotte, 1975 - yellowstriped oakworm
- Anisota punctata Riotte & Peigler, 1982
- Anisota senatoria (Smith, 1797) - orangestriped oakworm
- Anisota stigma (Fabricius, 1775) - spiny oakworm moth
- Anisota virginiensis (Drury, 1773) - pink-striped oakworm moth
