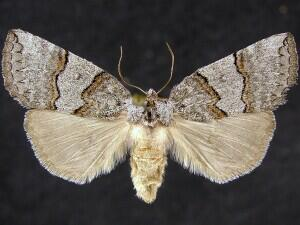
- Ceranemota crumbi shows off its soft forewings usually hidden underneath the bark-like hindwings.

Scientific classification
- Domain: Eukaryota
- Kingdom: Animalia
- Phylum: Arthropoda
- Class: Insecta
- Order: Lepidoptera
- Family: Drepanidae
- Genus: Ceranemota
- Species: C. crumbi

Binomial name
- Ceranemota crumbi Benjamin, 1938

= Ceranemota crumbi =

Species of false owlet moth

Ceranemota crumbi is a moth in the family Drepanidae. It was described by Foster Hendrickson Benjamin in 1938. It is found in North America, where it has been recorded from western Oregon and the Washington Cascade Range. Its habitat consists of coastal rainforests and mixed hardwood forests.

The length of ceranemota crumbi's forewings is 14–17 mm. Adults are on wing from late October to late November in one generation per year.

The larvae probably feed on hardwood species.
