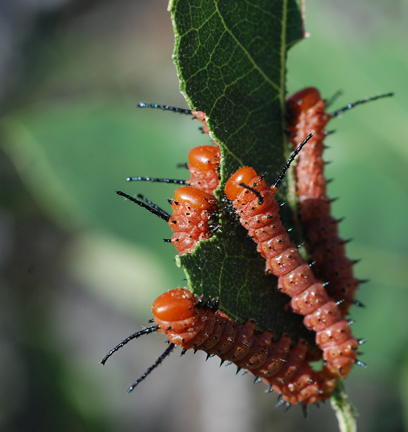
- Larvae

Scientific classification
- Domain: Eukaryota
- Kingdom: Animalia
- Phylum: Arthropoda
- Class: Insecta
- Order: Lepidoptera
- Family: Saturniidae
- Genus: Anisota
- Species: A. oslari

Binomial name
- Anisota oslari Rothschild, 1907

Synonyms
- Anisota skinneri Biederman, 1908; Anisota neomexicana Brehme, 1909

= Anisota oslari =

Oslar's oakworm moth

Species of moth

Anisota oslari, or Oslar's oakworm moth, is a moth of the family Saturniidae. It is found from south-western Colorado south through New Mexico and south-eastern Arizona to far western Texas and Mexico.

The wingspan is 50–86 mm. Adults are day fliers and are on wing from July to August in one generation per year. Adults do not feed.

The larvae feed on various Quercus (oak) species, including Quercus oblongifolia and Quercus turbinella. Young larvae are gregarious, but become solitary as they grow. Fully grown larvae pupate and overwinter in shallow underground chambers.
