= List of moths of Canada (Lasiocampidae) =

Partial list of Canadian moths

This is a list of the moths of family Lasiocampidae that are found in Canada. It also acts as an index to the species articles and forms part of the full List of moths of Canada.

Following the species name, there is an abbreviation that indicates the Canadian provinces or territories in which the species can be found.

- Western Canada
  - BC = British Columbia
  - AB = Alberta
  - SK = Saskatchewan
  - MB = Manitoba
  - YT = Yukon
  - NT = Northwest Territories
  - NU = Nunavut
- Eastern Canada
  - ON = Ontario
  - QC = Quebec
  - NB = New Brunswick
  - NS = Nova Scotia
  - PE = Prince Edward Island
  - NF = Newfoundland
  - LB = Labrador

== Subfamily Lasiocampinae ==
- Heteropacha rileyana Harvey, 1874 -ON
- Phyllodesma americana (Harris, 1841) -NS, PE, NB, QC, ON, MB, SK, AB, BC, YT
- Malacosoma americana (Fabricius, 1793) -NS, PE, NB, QC, ON, MB, SK, AB
- Malacosoma californica (Packard, 1864) -QC, ON, MB, SK, AB, BC, NT
- Malacosoma disstria Hübner, 1820 -NS, PE, NB, QC, ON, MB, SK, AB, BC

== Subfamily Macromphaliinae ==
- Tolype dayi Blackmore, 1921 -BC
- Tolype laricis (Fitch, 1856) -NS, PE, NB, QC, ON, MB, SK, AB, BC
- Tolype notialis Franclemont, 1973 -ON
- Tolype velleda (Stoll, 1791) -NS, NB, QC, ON
