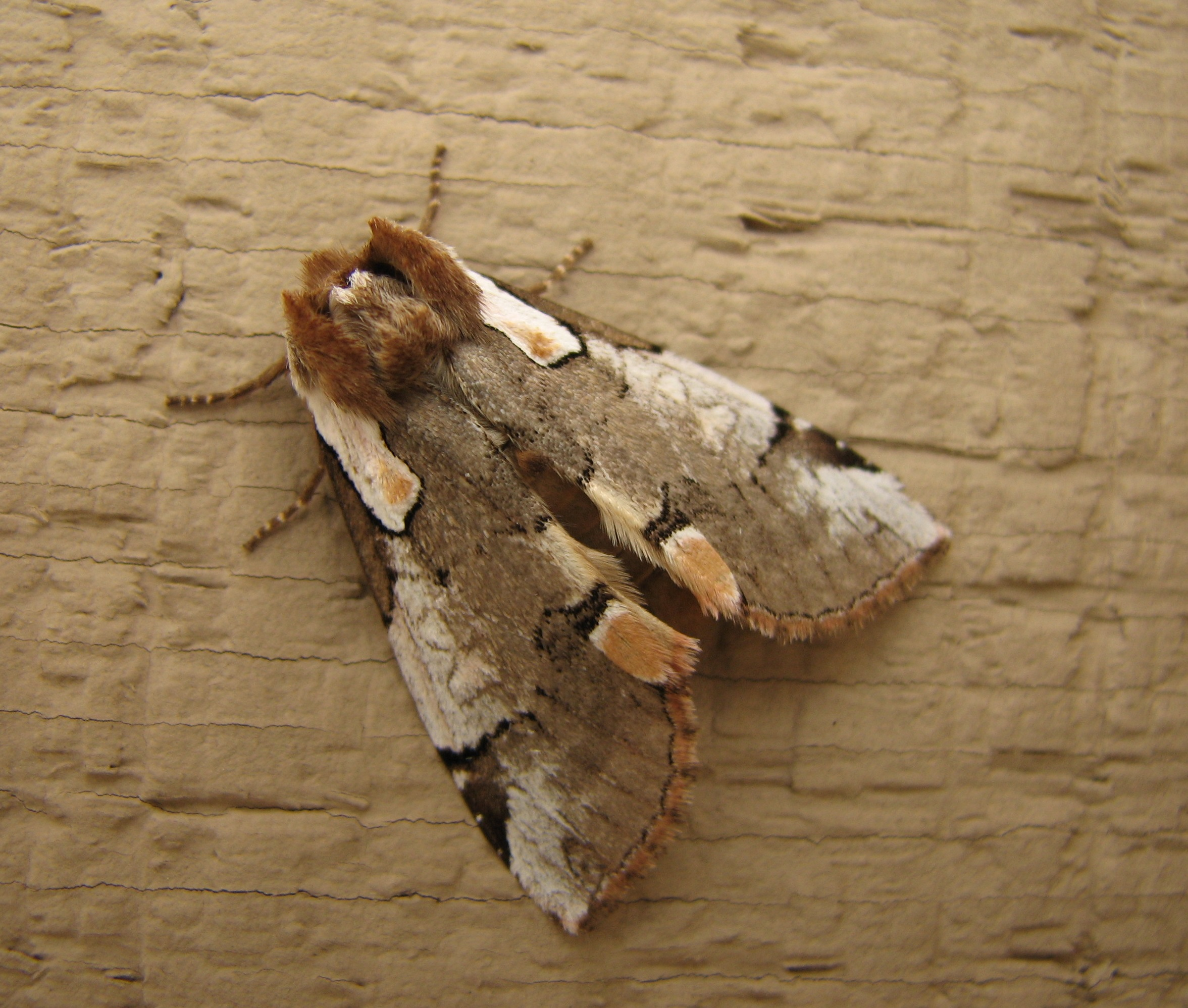
- Euthyatira lorata

Scientific classification
- Domain: Eukaryota
- Kingdom: Animalia
- Phylum: Arthropoda
- Class: Insecta
- Order: Lepidoptera
- Family: Drepanidae
- Subfamily: Thyatirinae
- Genus: Euthyatira; Smith, 1891

Synonyms
- Persiscota Grote, 1895; Monothyatira Werny, 1966

= Euthyatira =

Moth genus in family Drepanidae

Euthyatira is a genus of moths in the subfamily Thyatirinae. It was first described by Smith in 1891.

== Species ==
- Euthyatira lorata (Grote, 1881)
- Euthyatira pryeri (Butler, 1881)
- Euthyatira pudens (Guenée, 1852)
- Euthyatira semicircularis (Grote, 1881)
