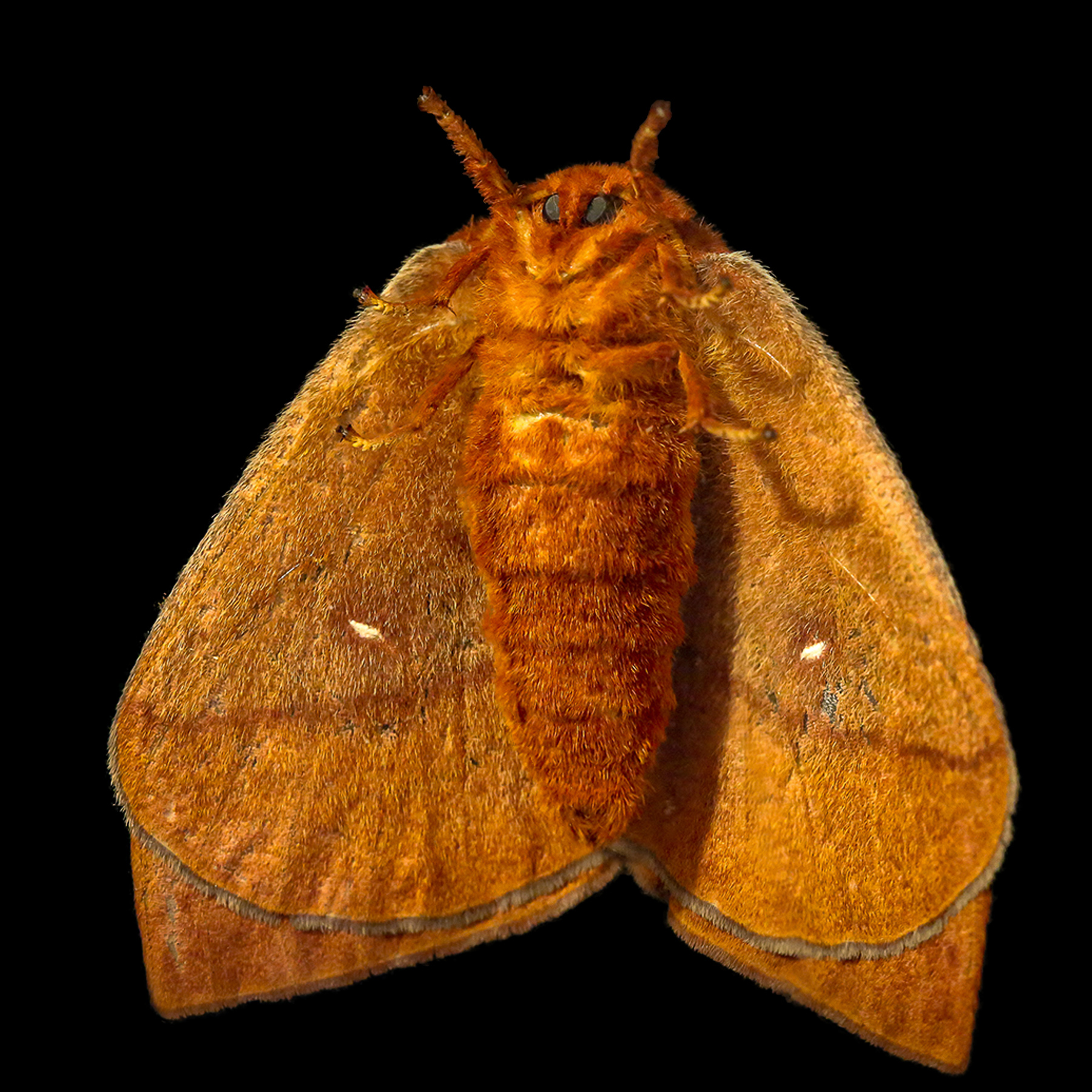

Scientific classification
- Kingdom: Animalia
- Phylum: Arthropoda
- Clade: Pancrustacea
- Class: Insecta
- Order: Lepidoptera
- Family: Saturniidae
- Genus: Anisota
- Species: A. consularis

Binomial name
- Anisota consularis Dyar, 1896

= Anisota consularis =

Species of moth

Anisota consularis, the Florida oakworm moth or consular oakworm moth, is a moth in the family Saturniidae. The species was first described by Harrison Gray Dyar Jr. in 1896. It is found in North America.
