= List of moths of Canada =

Canadian biota list

This page provides links to detailed lists of moth species that have been recorded in Canada. The lists are sorted by family.

As of 2019, 5405 Lepidoptera species, across 81 families, were known to occur in Canada.

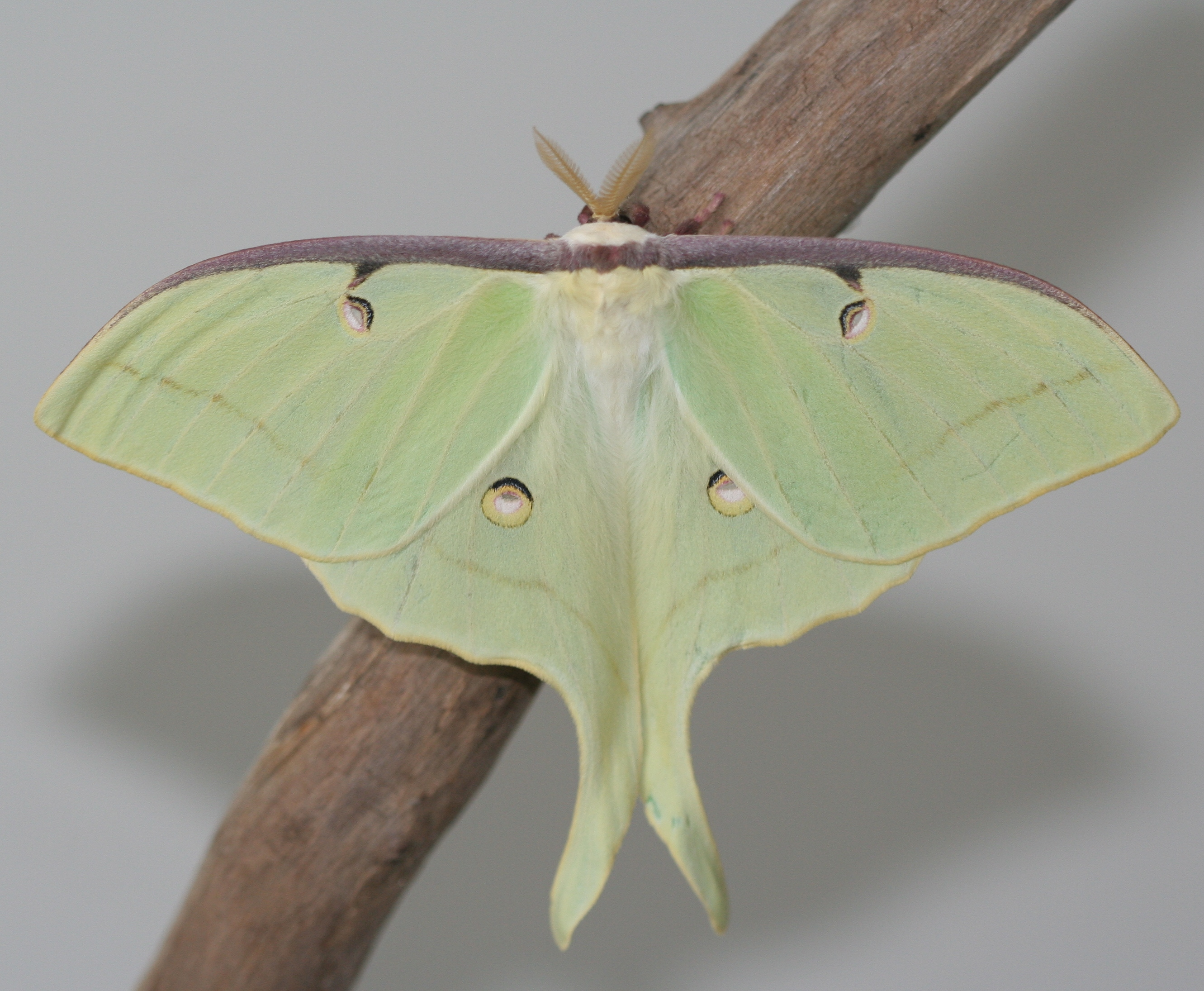
Luna moth (Actias luna)

== Mimallonoidea ==
- Mimallonidae

== Lasiocampoidea ==
- Lasiocampidae

== Bombycoidea ==
- Bombycidae
- Saturniidae
- Sphingidae

== Noctuoidea ==
- subfamily Arctiinae
- subfamily Lymantriinae
- Noctuidae
- Nolidae
- Notodontidae
- Thaumetopoeidae

== Drepanoidea ==
- Drepanidae

== Geometroidea ==
- Geometridae
- Uraniidae

== Cossoidea ==
- Cossidae
- Sesiidae

== Zygaenoidea ==
- Limacodidae
- Zygaenidae

== Microlepidoptera ==
- Micromoths

== See also ==
- List of butterflies of Canada
- List of damselflies of Canada
- List of dragonflies of Canada
