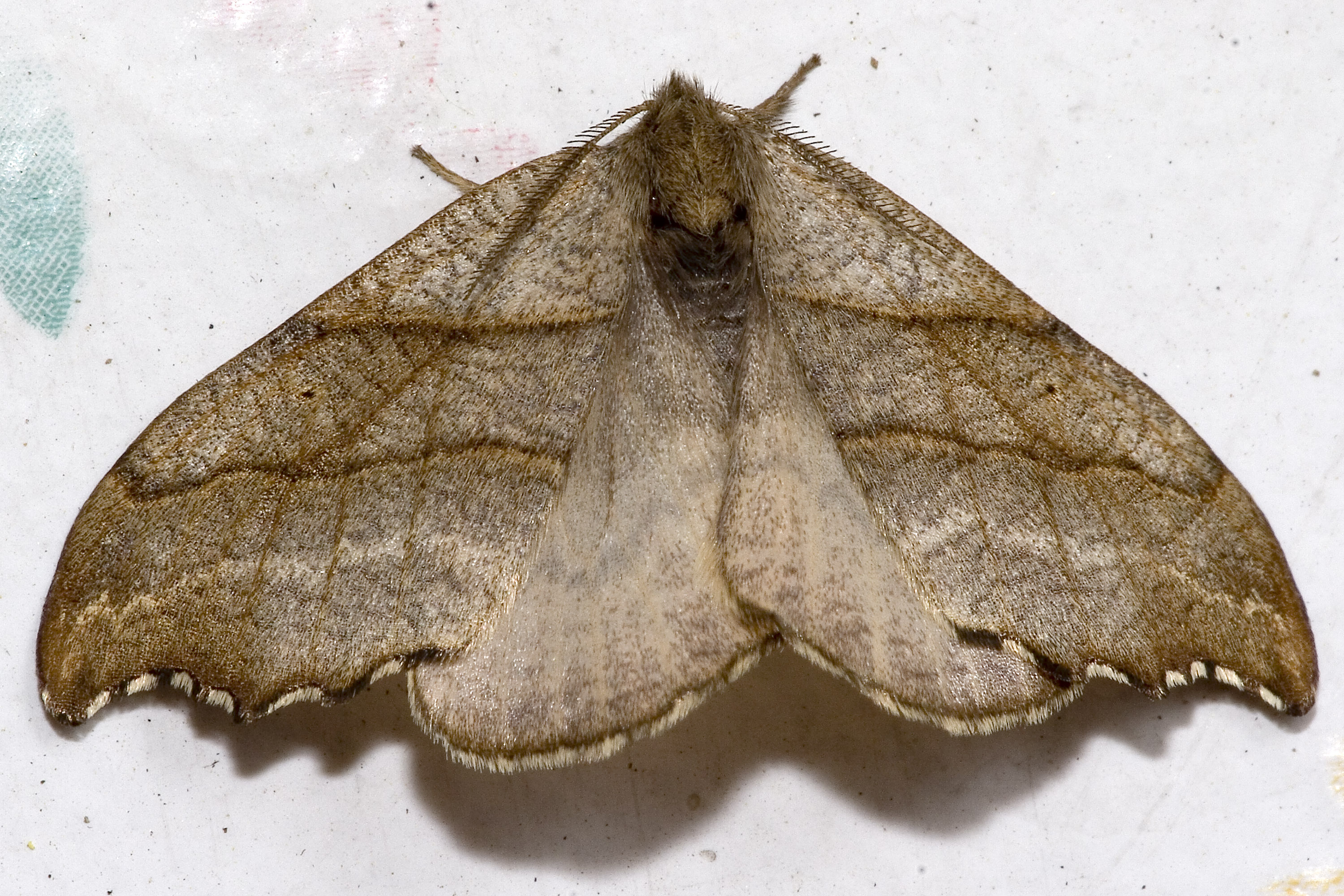

Scientific classification
- Kingdom: Animalia
- Phylum: Arthropoda
- Class: Insecta
- Order: Lepidoptera
- Family: Drepanidae
- Genus: Falcaria
- Species: F. lacertinaria

Binomial name
- Falcaria lacertinaria (Linnaeus, 1758)

Synonyms
- Phalaena lacertinaria Linnaeus, 1758; Bombyx lacertula Denis & Schiffermüller, 1775; Geometra dentaria Thunberg, 1784; Drepana scincula Hübner, 1800; Drepana curvula Haworth, 1809; Drepana aestiva Rebel, 1910; Drepana brykaria Schulze, 1912; Drepana takoraria Schulze, 1912; Falcaria lacertinaria f. erosula Laspeyres, 1803; Drepana dimidiata Tengström, 1869; Falcaria lacertinaria ab. interpres Schulze, 1912; Falcaria lacertinaria ab. fasciata Lempke, 1938; Falcaria lacertinaria ab. impuncta Lempke, 1938; Falcaria lacertinaria ab. conjuncta Richardson, 1952; Falcaria lacertinaria f. approximata Lempke, 1960; Falcaria lacertinaria f. obscura Lempke, 1960

= Falcaria lacertinaria =

Species of hook-tip moth

Falcaria lacertinaria, the scalloped hook-tip, is a moth of the family Drepanidae. The species was first described by Carl Linnaeus in his 1758 10th edition of Systema Naturae It is found in Europe and Anatolia then east to Eastern Siberia.

== Description ==
The wingspan is 27–35 mm. The forewings are ochreous, mixed and strigulated with dark fuscous. The veins are darker. The first and second lines are dark fuscous, nearly straight and parallel. There is a black discal dot and the wing apex is suffused with ochreous-brown. The termen is irregularly dentate. The cilia are blackish, spotted with white. The hind wings are whitish- ochreous, fuscous -sprinkled and posteriorly brownish -tinged with a faint grey postmedian line and a dark fuscous discal dot. The larva is ochreous-brown, darker marked. The dorsal line is anteriorly pale, dark-edged, posteriorly dark and interrupted. There are two blackish dorsal marks on segment 6, preceded by a pale area and pairs of tubercular prominences on 3, 4, and 12. The first generation may be more silvery-grey, the second generation smaller and lighter brown.

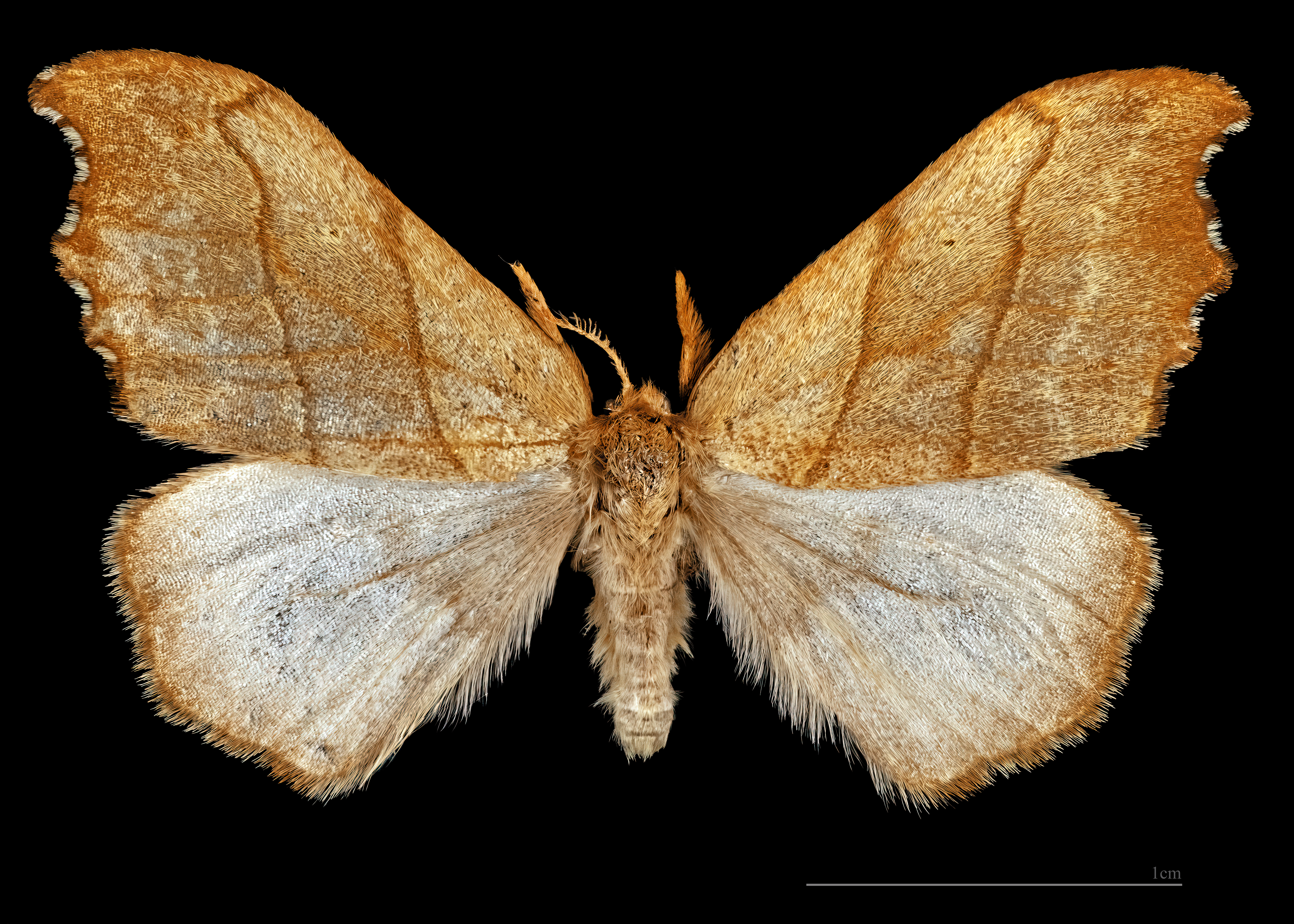
♂

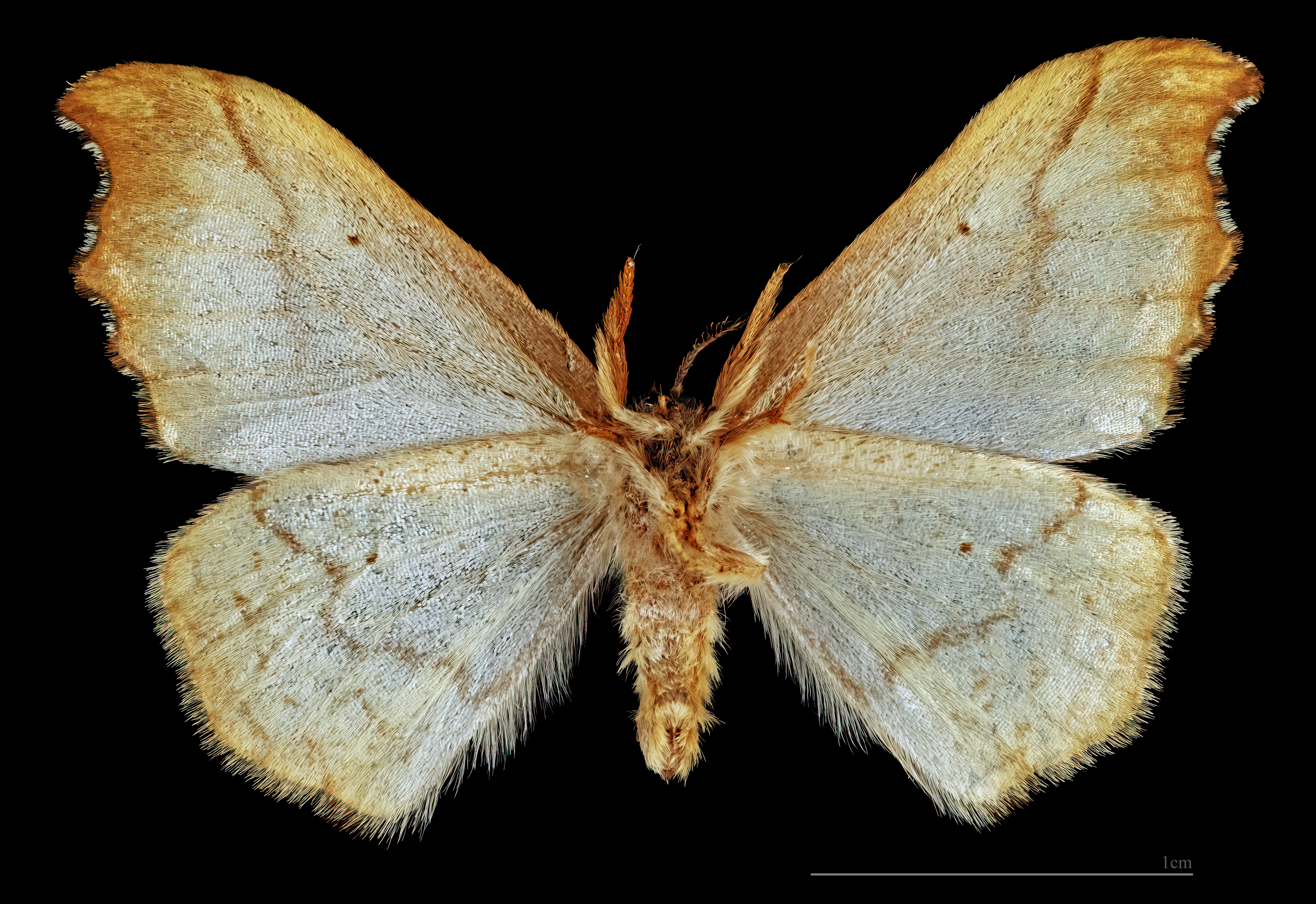
♂ △

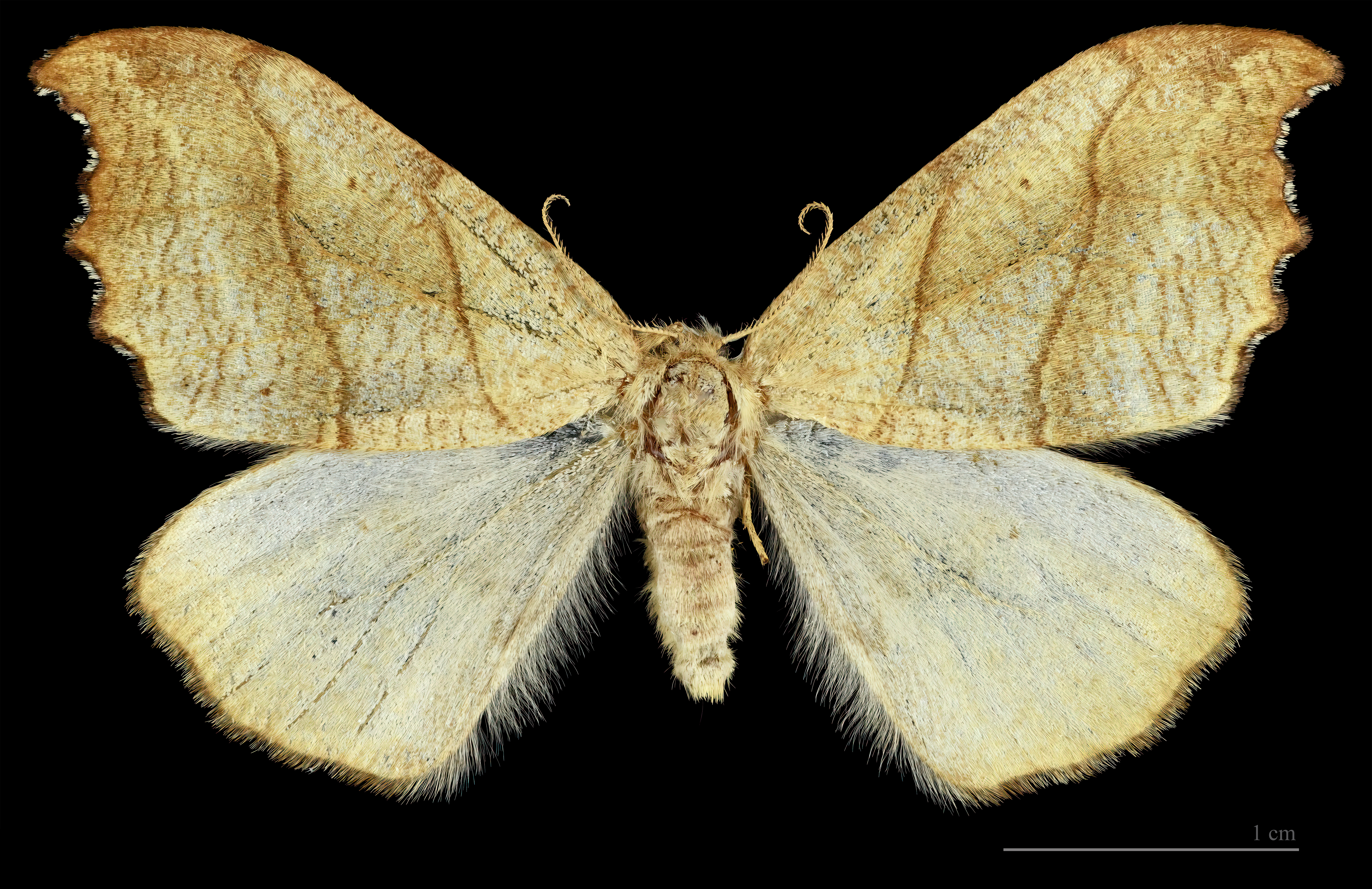
♀

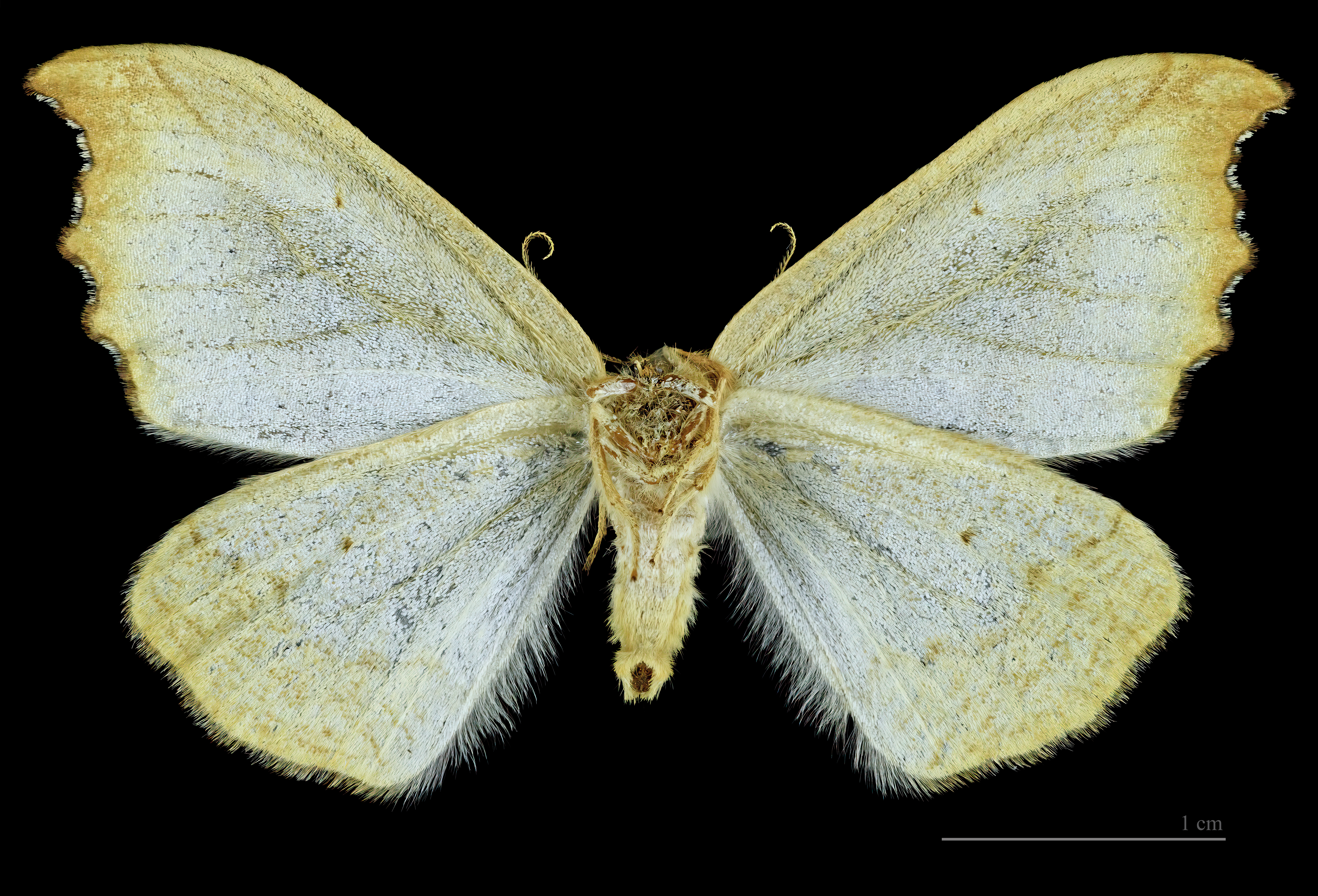
♀ △

== Biology ==
The moth flies from April to August in two generations depending on the location.

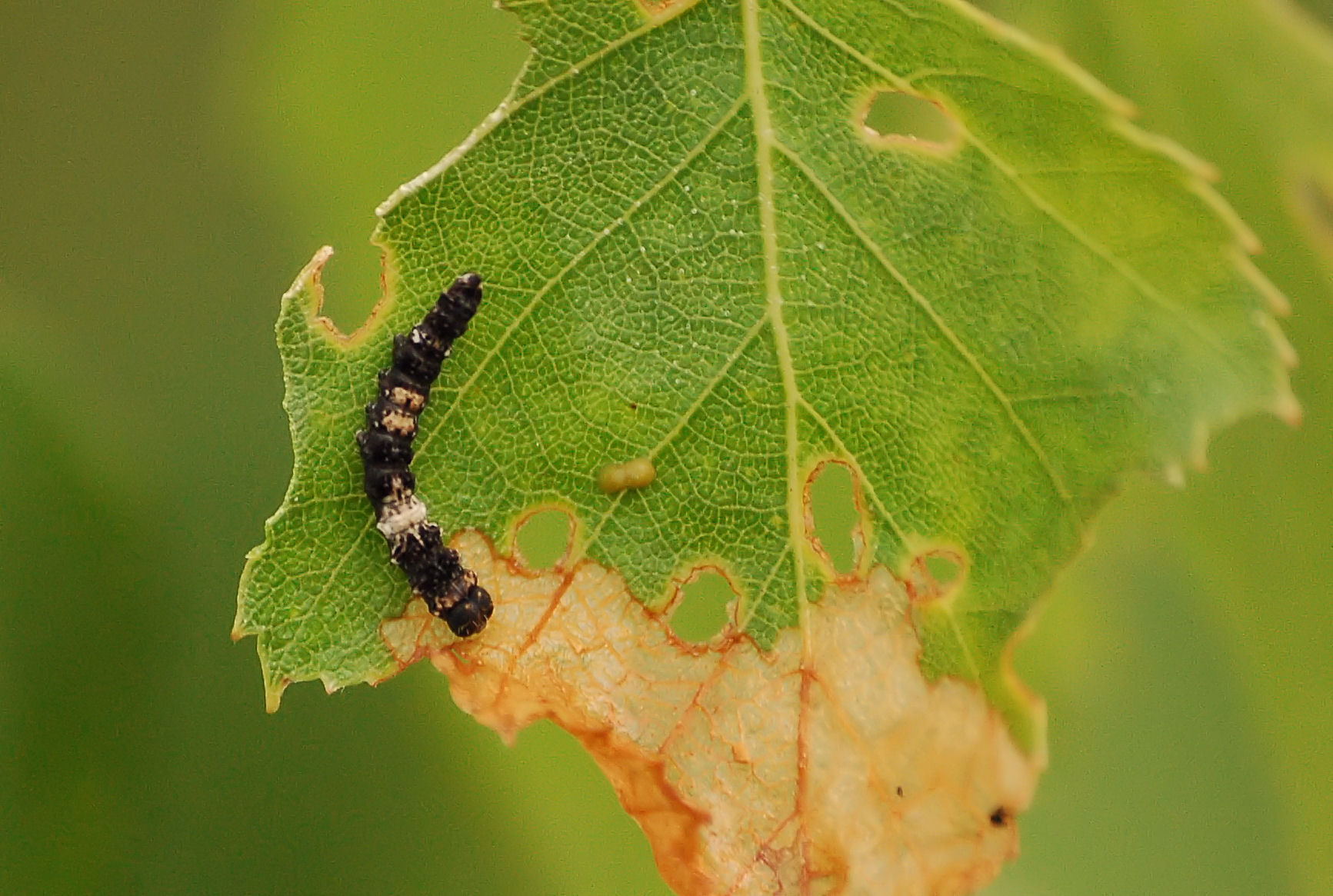
Caterpillar

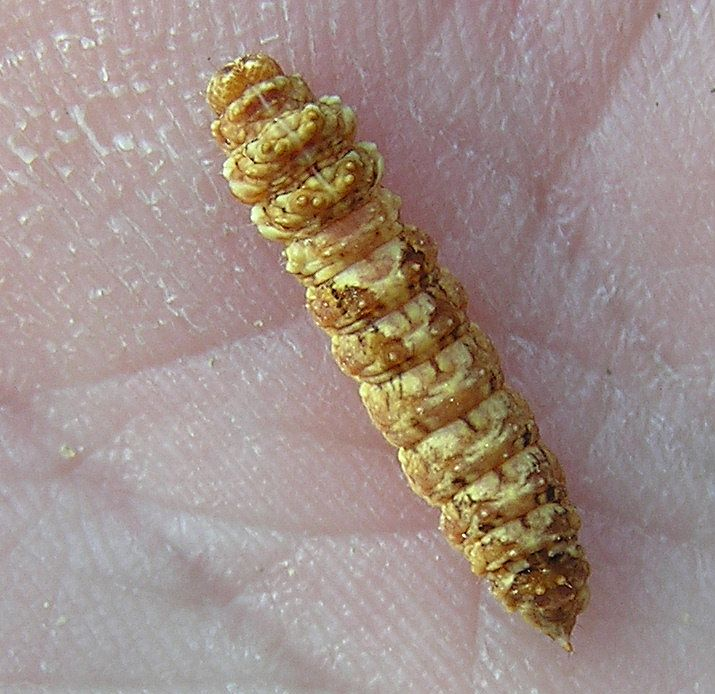

The larvae feed on birch and alder.
