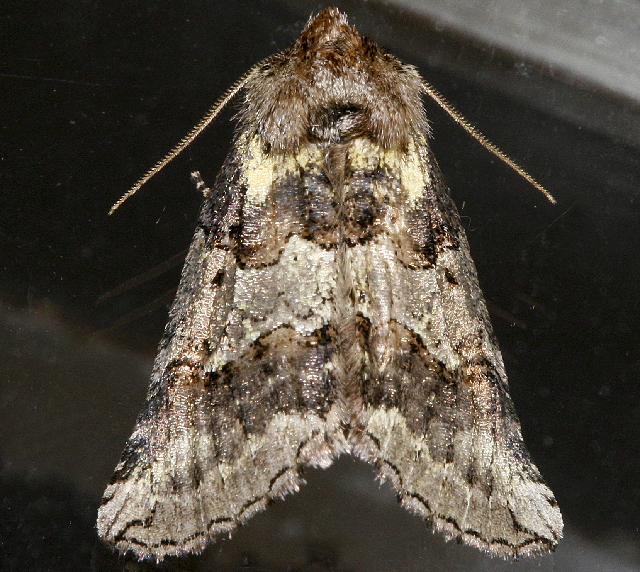

Scientific classification
- Domain: Eukaryota
- Kingdom: Animalia
- Phylum: Arthropoda
- Class: Insecta
- Order: Lepidoptera
- Family: Drepanidae
- Genus: Ceranemota
- Species: C. improvisa

Binomial name
- Ceranemota improvisa (H. Edwards, 1873)

Synonyms
- Cymatophora improvisa H. Edwards, 1873

= Ceranemota improvisa =

Species of false owlet moth

Ceranemota improvisa is a moth in the family Drepanidae. It was described by Henry Edwards in 1873. It is found in North America, where it has been recorded from northern California, western Oregon, western Washington and south-western British Columbia. Adults are on wing from late September to November in one generation per year.

The larvae feed on Crataegus douglasii and Prunus species.
