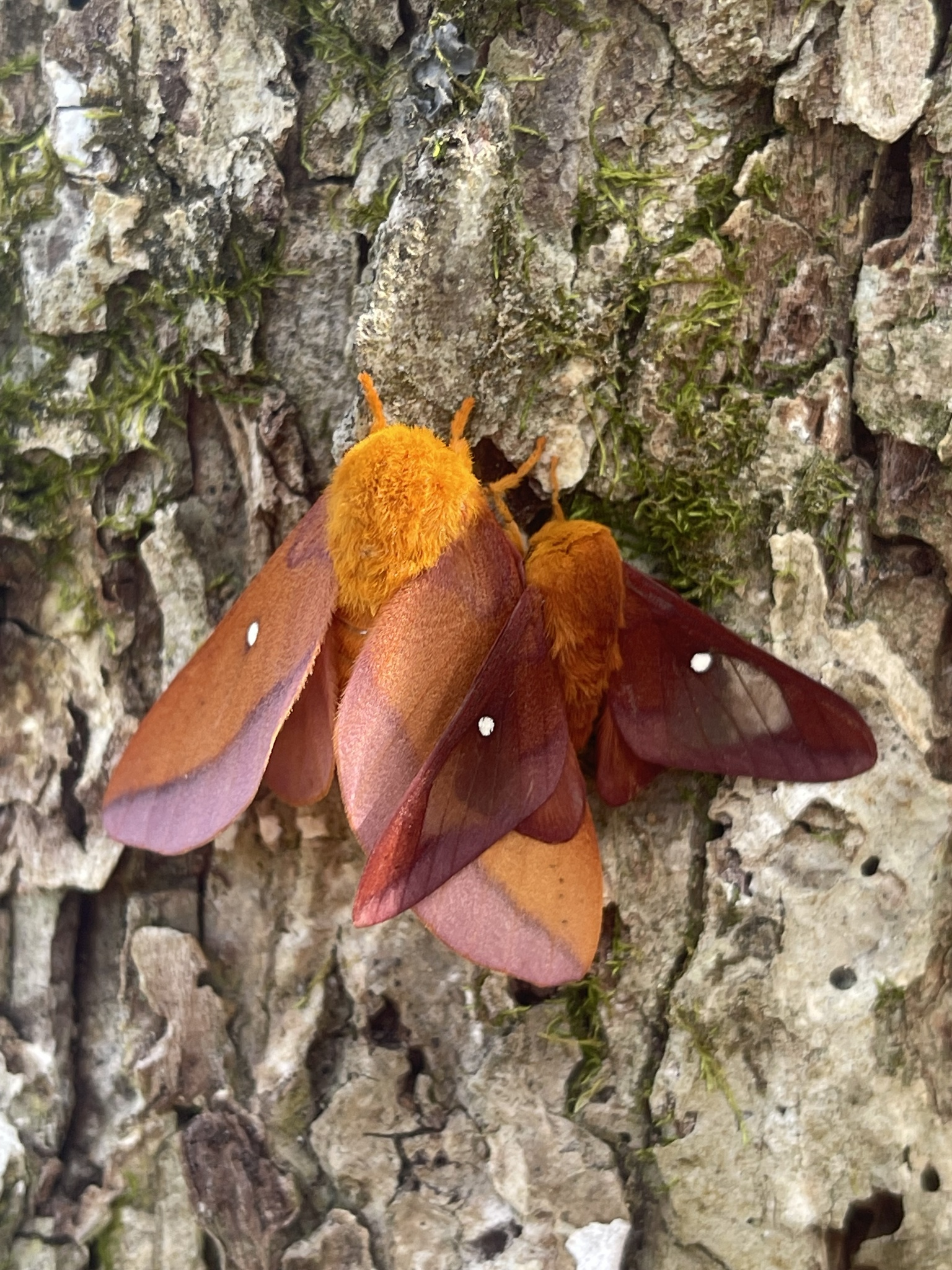
- Southern pink-striped oakworm moth, female (left) and male

Conservation status
- Secure (NatureServe)

Scientific classification
- Kingdom: Animalia
- Phylum: Arthropoda
- Clade: Pancrustacea
- Class: Insecta
- Order: Lepidoptera
- Family: Saturniidae
- Genus: Anisota
- Species: A. virginiensis

Binomial name
- Anisota virginiensis (Drury, 1773)

Synonyms
- Phalaena virginiensis Drury, 1773; Phalaena pellucida Smith, 1797; Anisota sinulis Riotte, 1970; Anisota virginiensis pellucida (Smith, 1797); Anisota virginiensis discolor Ferguson, 1971

= Anisota virginiensis =

Species of moth

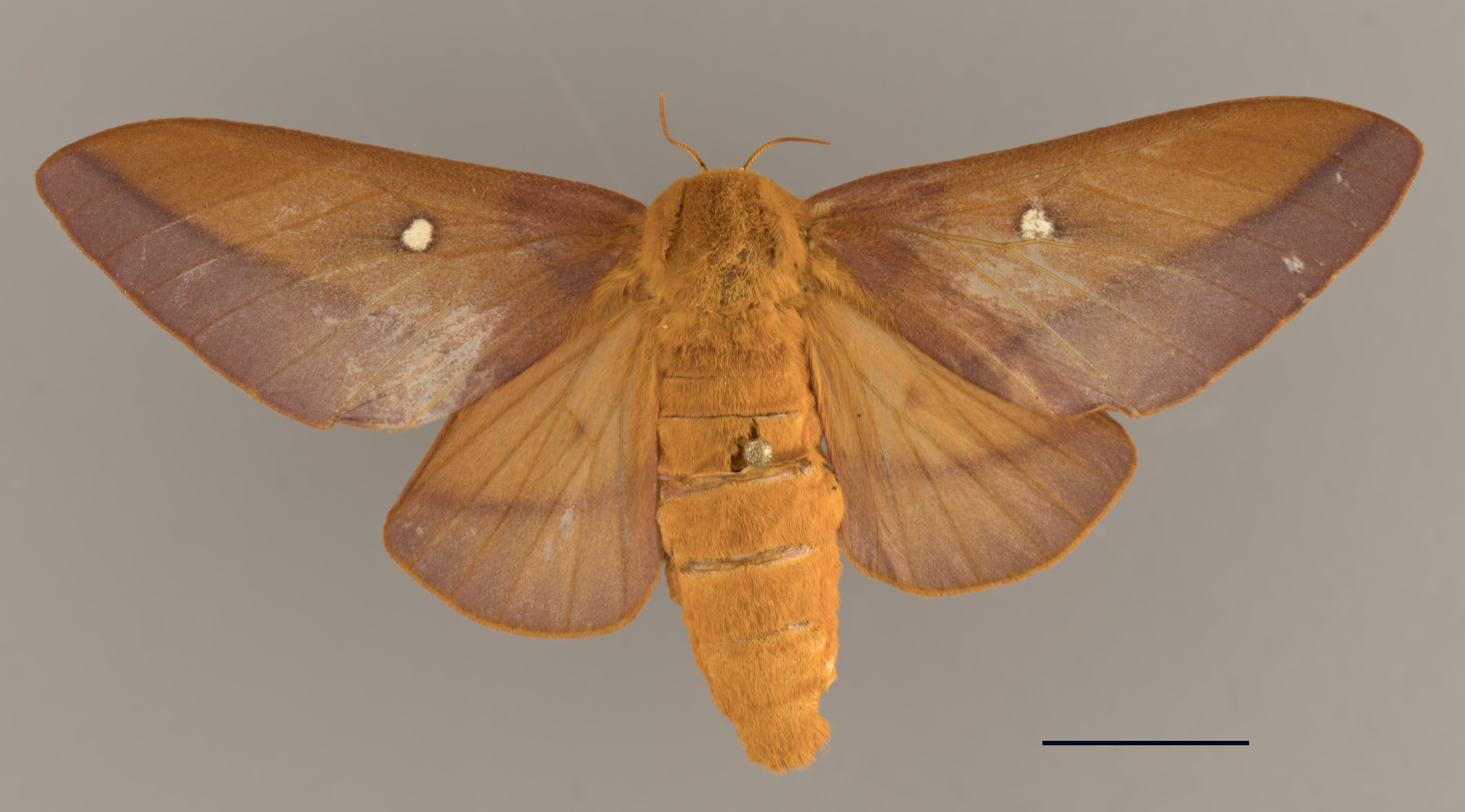
Anisota viginiensis (Drury, 1773), the southern pink-striped oakworm moth, collected outside of doctor's office in Eatonton, GA. Scale bar represents 0.5 cm.

Anisota virginiensis, the pink-striped oakworm moth, is a species of silk moth of the family Saturniidae.

== Description ==
The female's wings are purplish red with ochre-yellow. They have thin scales and are almost transparent. The male's wings are purplish brown with a large transparent space in the middle. The female is larger than the male. The wing span is 4.2 to 6.6 centimeters.

== Habitat ==
The moth can be found across Canada from Nova Scotia to southeastern Manitoba, and in the United States. It lives in deciduous woodlands and suburbs.

== Biology ==
Females release a pheromone which attracts males that swarm around her like bees. Mating occurs during the morning. It is a rapid process. The male and female stay together for the rest of the day and then the female finds a place to lay eggs, usually under oak leaves. Such mating swarms have been observed at carrion, where host plants may be higher quality due to the influx of nutrients associated with decomposition.

The caterpillars are gray or greenish with dull brownish yellow or rosy stripes. There are scales on each segment and two long spines on the mesothorax. The caterpillars pupate for a short time. They feed on the foliage of oak trees, maples, birches, and hazels. The caterpillar overwinters in the soil as a pupa. Caterpillars that are newly hatched or are in the middle of growing feed in groups while those that are mature or nearly so feed separately. The caterpillar is about an eighth of an inch long. The head is large in proportion to the body. The inside of the mouth is yellow. The legs are semi-translucent.

== Ecology ==
Conservation regimes are not required for this species. It is considered a pest of forests because it defoliates trees. Outbreaks can be treated with an arsenical spray.

== Life cycle gallery ==
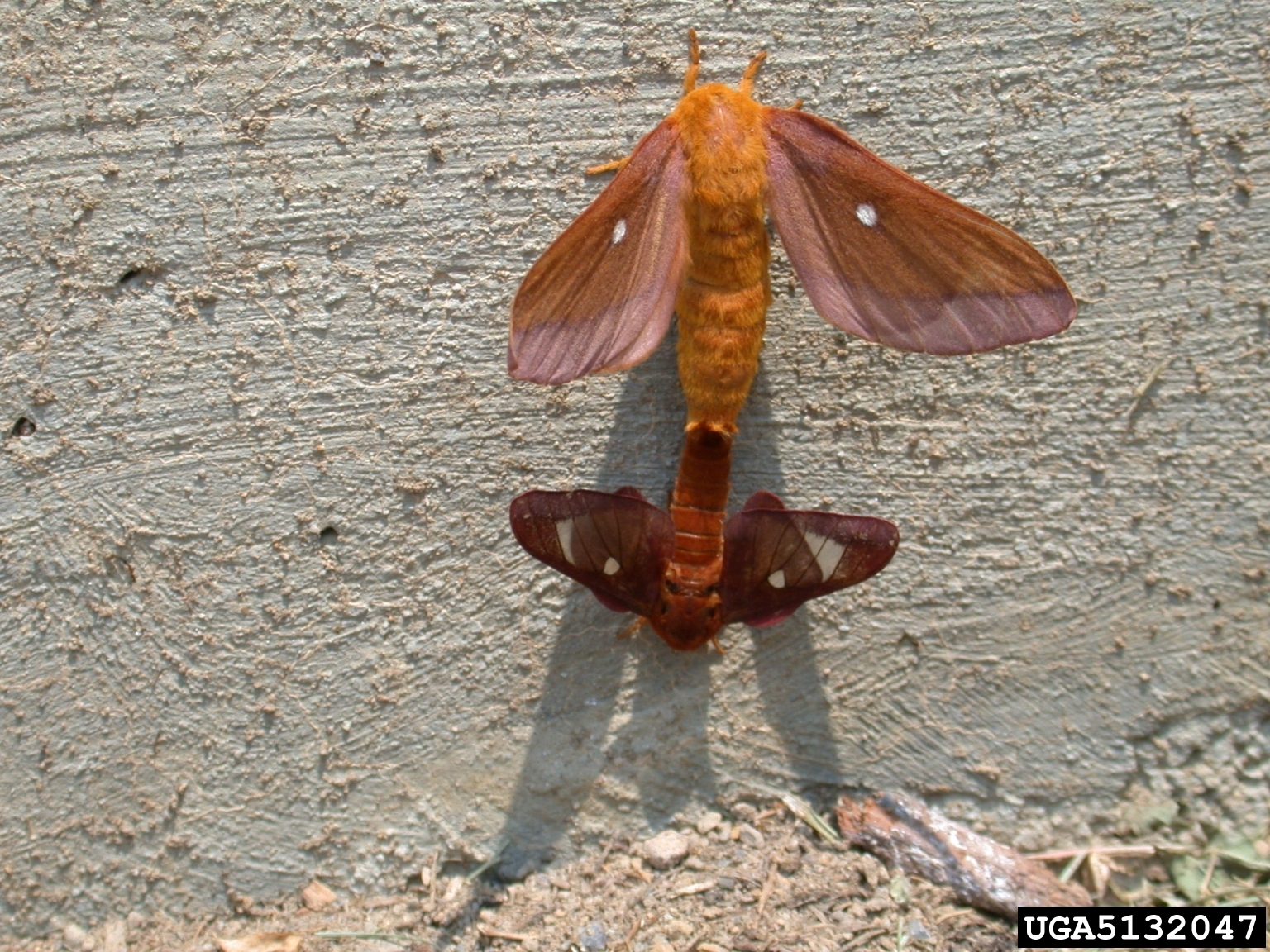
Mating

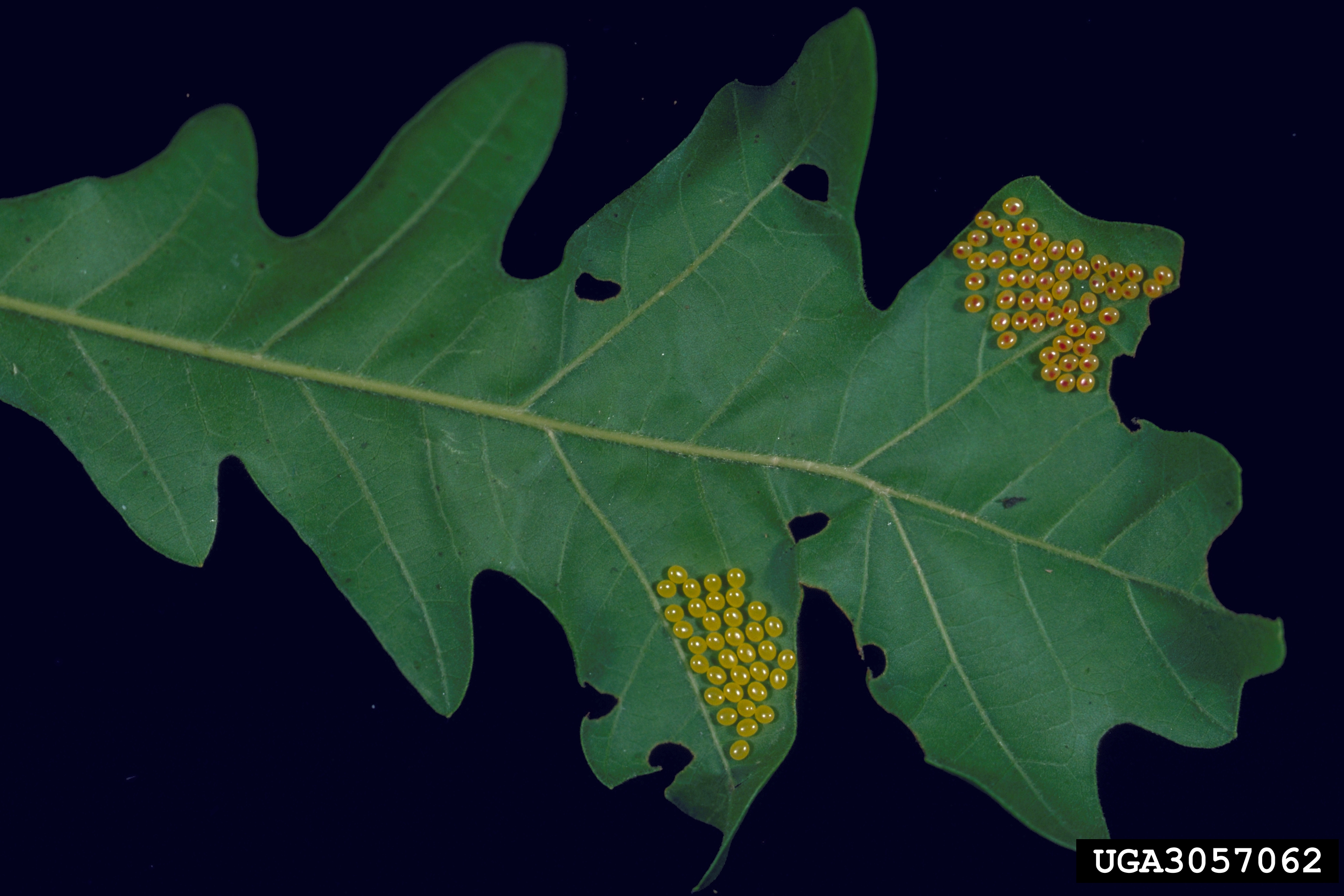
Eggs

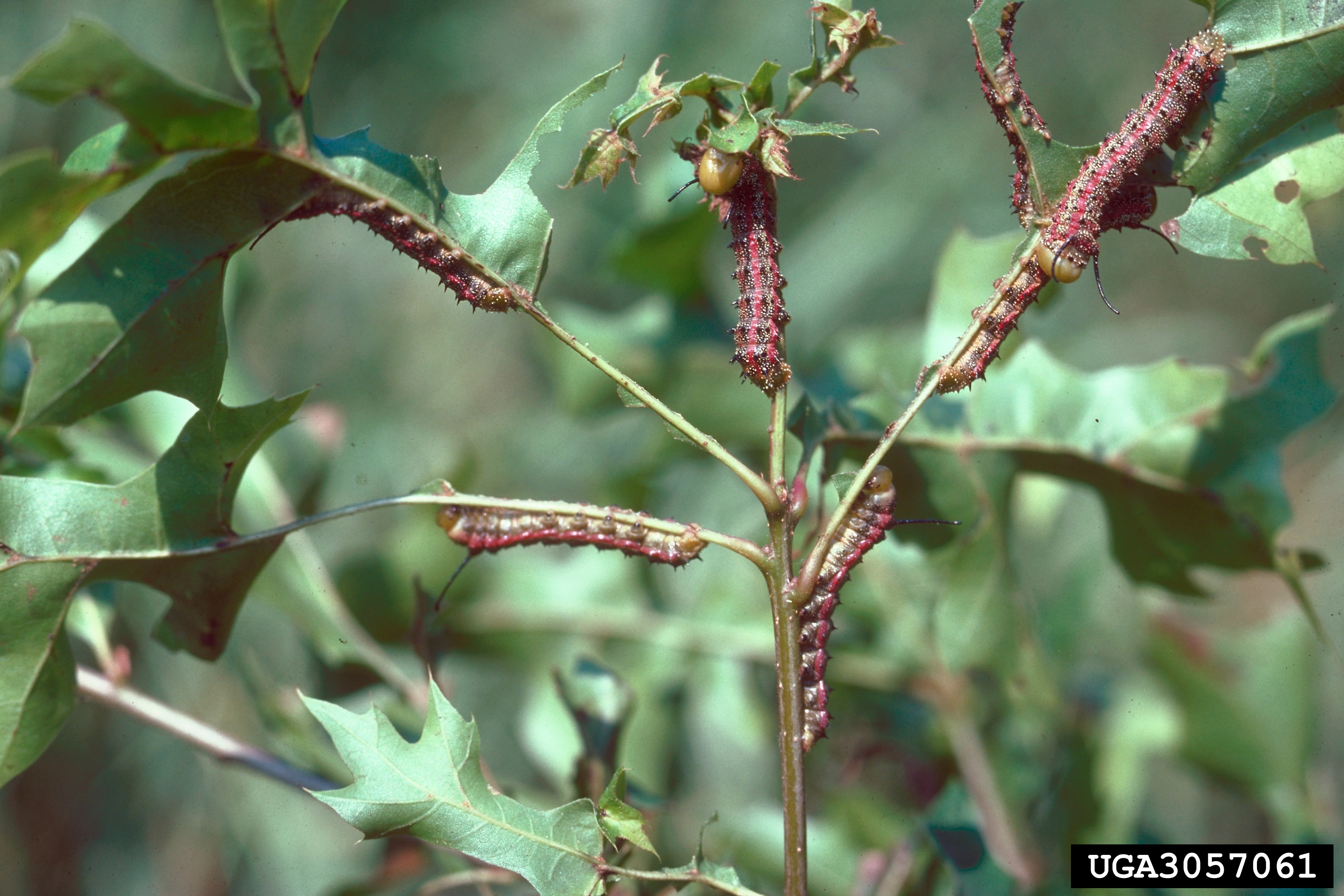
Larvae feeding on Quercus texana

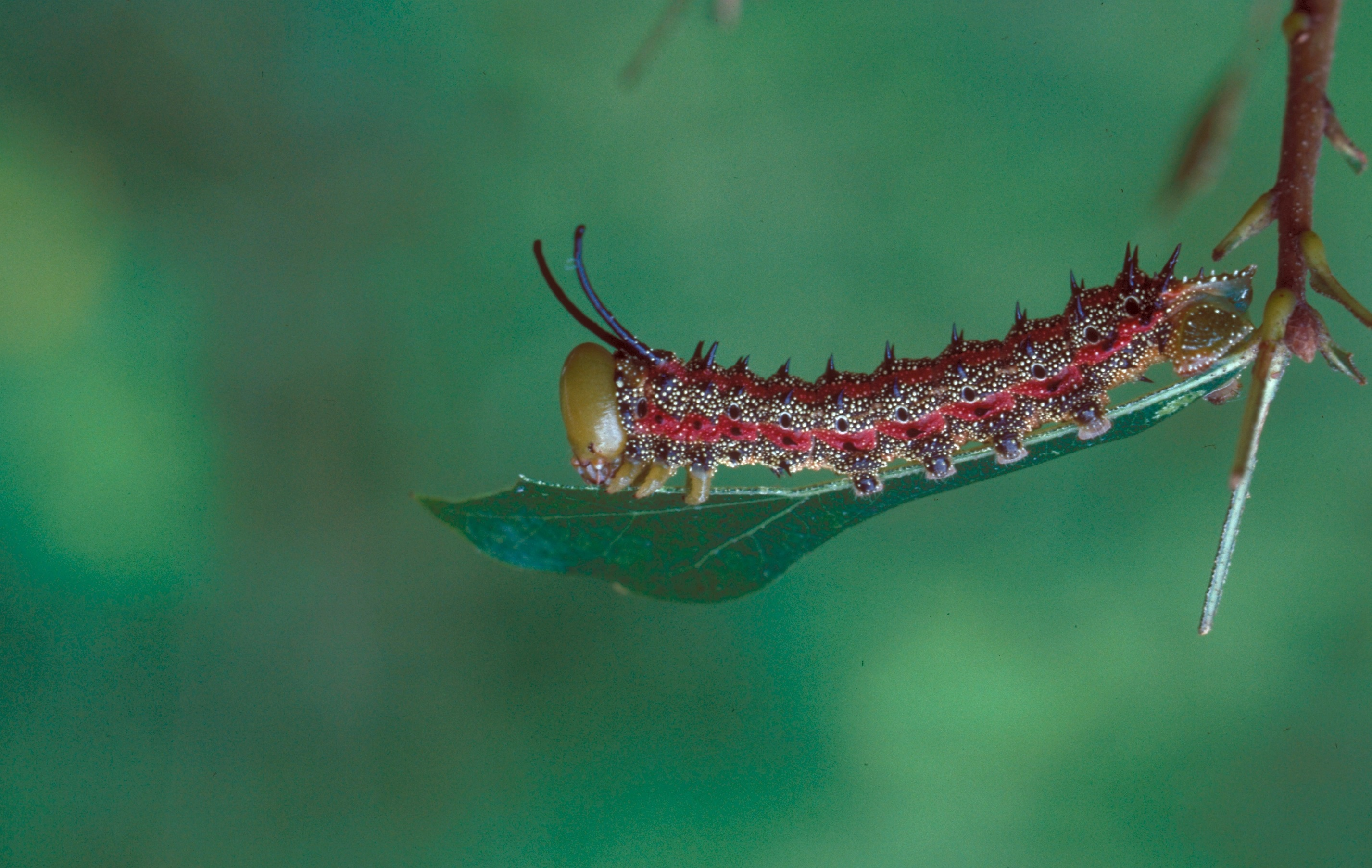
Larva

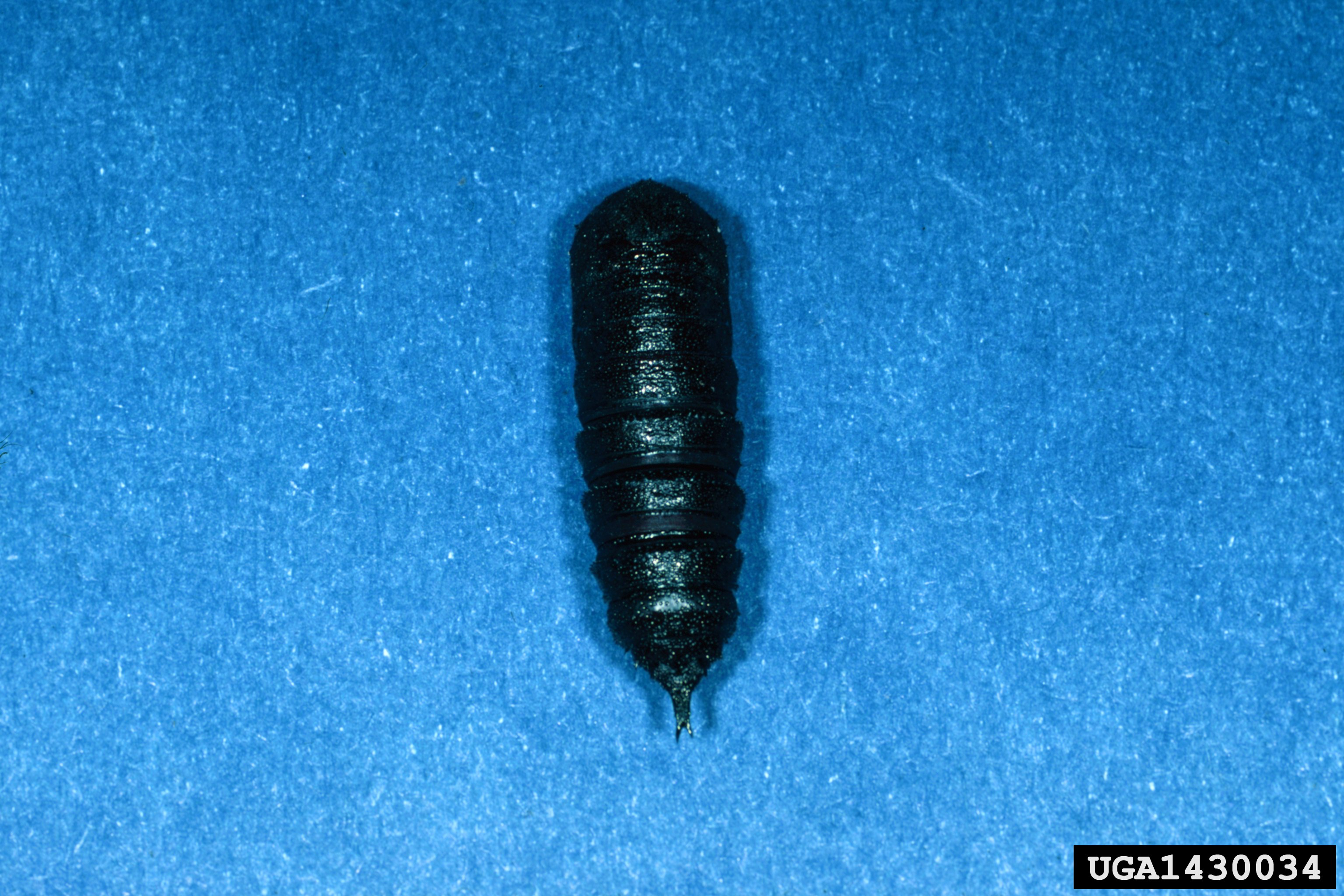
Pupa
