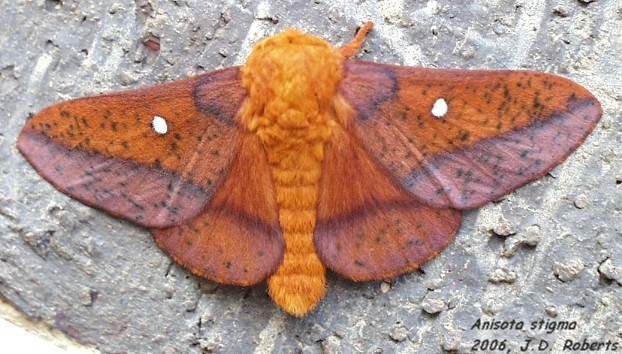

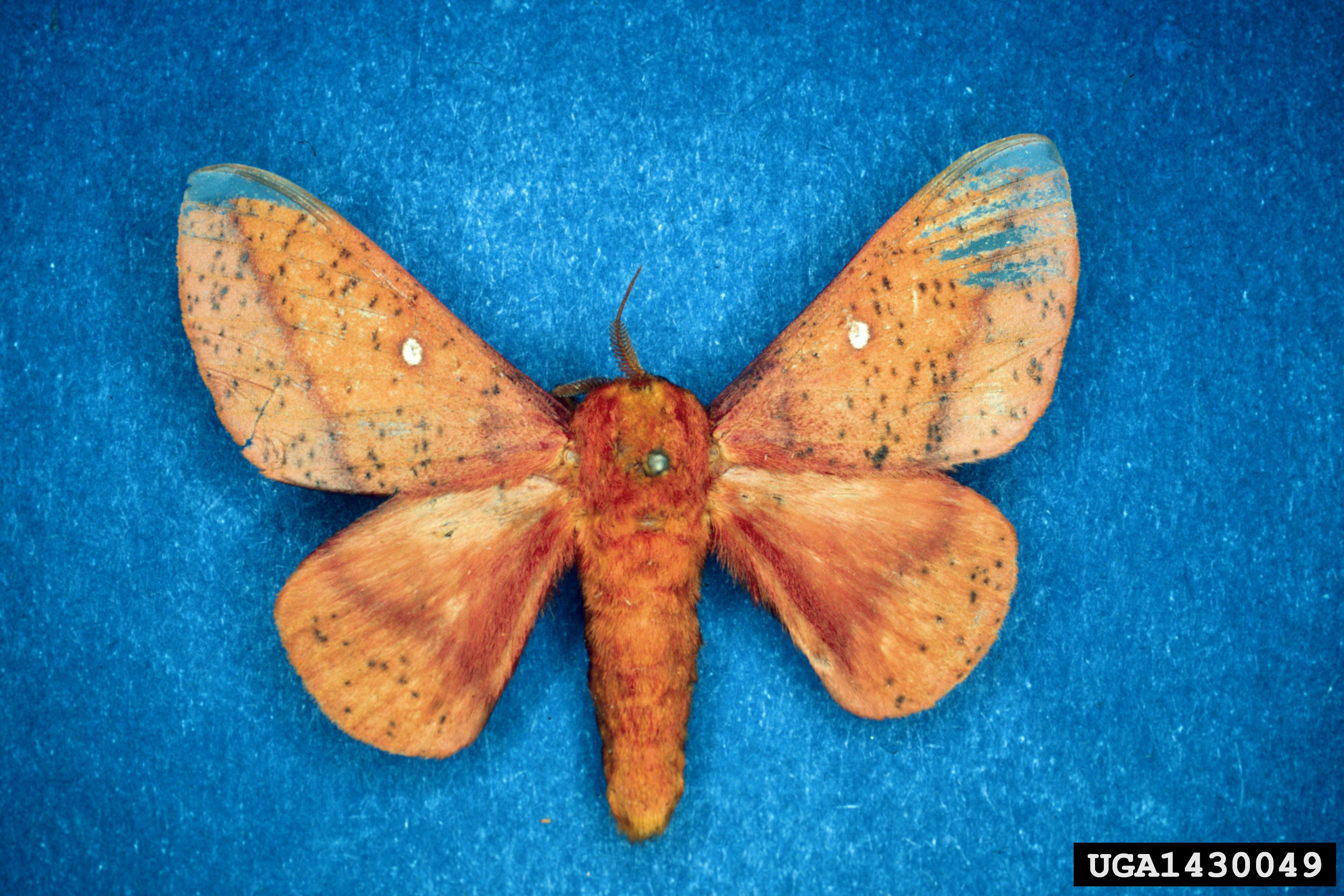

Scientific classification
- Domain: Eukaryota
- Kingdom: Animalia
- Phylum: Arthropoda
- Class: Insecta
- Order: Lepidoptera
- Family: Saturniidae
- Genus: Anisota
- Species: A. stigma

Binomial name
- Anisota stigma (Fabricius, 1775)

Synonyms
- Bombyx stigma Fabricius, 1775

= Anisota stigma =

Spiny oakworm moth

Species of moth

Anisota stigma, the spiny oakworm moth, is a moth of the family Saturniidae. The species was first described by Johan Christian Fabricius in 1775. It is found in North America from Massachusetts and southern Ontario to Florida, west to Minnesota, Kansas and Texas.

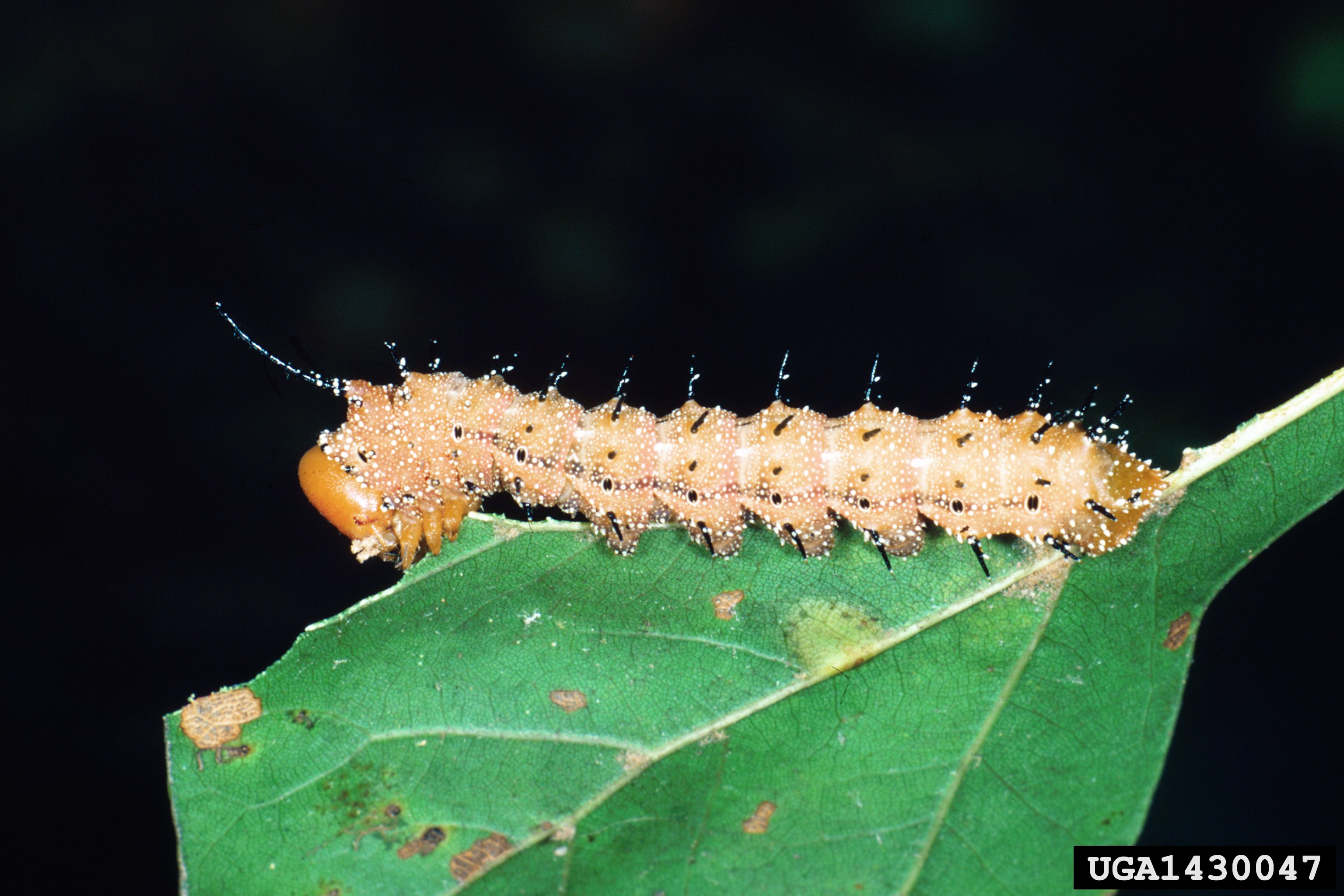
Larva

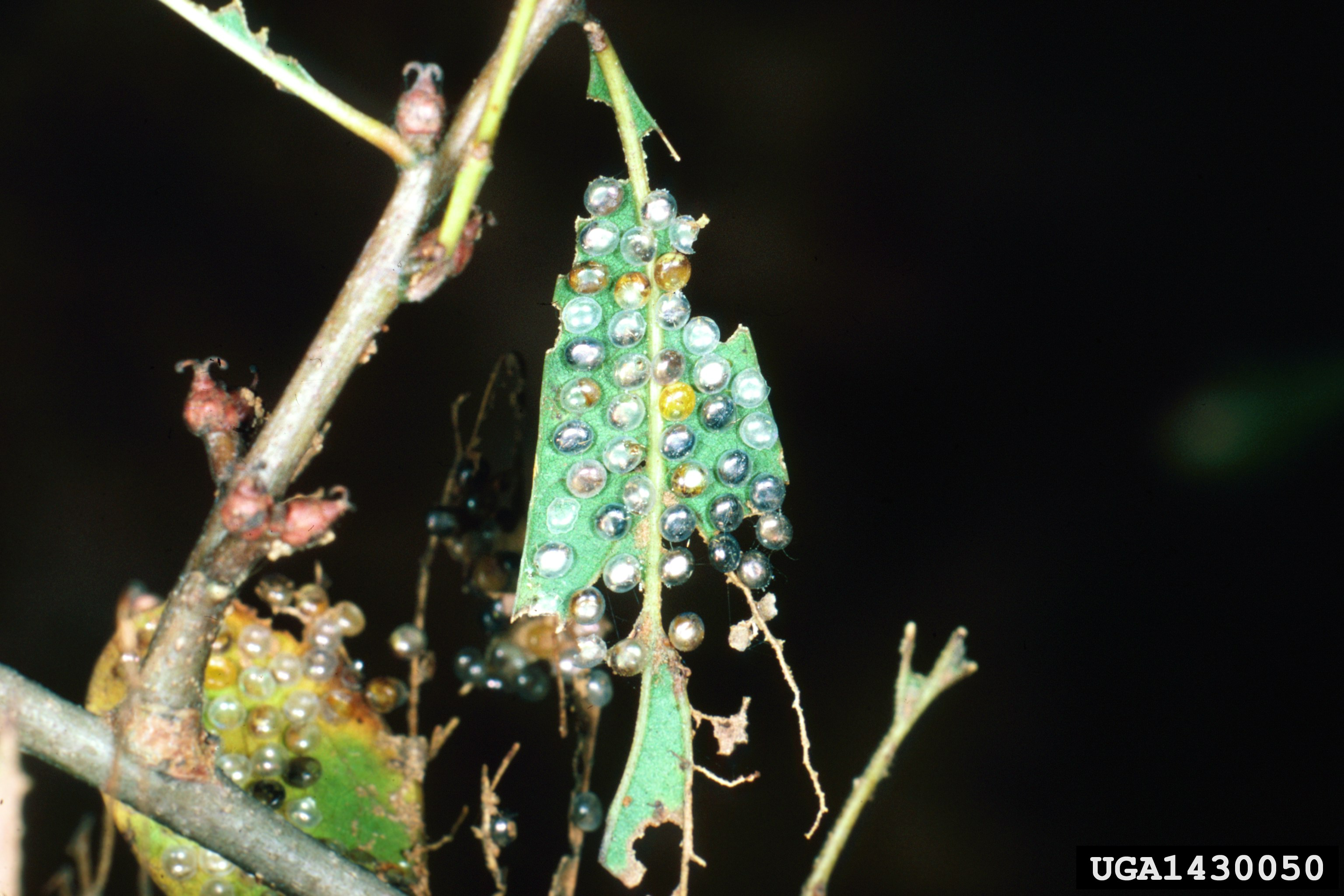
Eggs

The wingspan is about 45 millimetres (2 in).

The larvae mainly feed on oak, but have also been reported on hazel and basswood. Anisota stigma is the only Anisota species with males known to be attracted to light.
