= Anisota manitobensis =

Conservation status
- Critically Imperiled (NatureServe)

Scientific classification
- Kingdom: Animalia
- Phylum: Arthropoda
- Clade: Pancrustacea
- Class: Insecta
- Order: Lepidoptera
- Family: Saturniidae
- Genus: Anisota
- Species: A. manitobensis

Binomial name
- Anisota manitobensis McDunnough, 1921

Species of moth

Anisota manitobensis, the Manitoba oakworm moth, is a species of royal moth in the family Saturniidae. It is found in North America, primarily Manitoba.

Early instar caterpillars are highly gregarious. They feed on Quercus macrocarpa.
