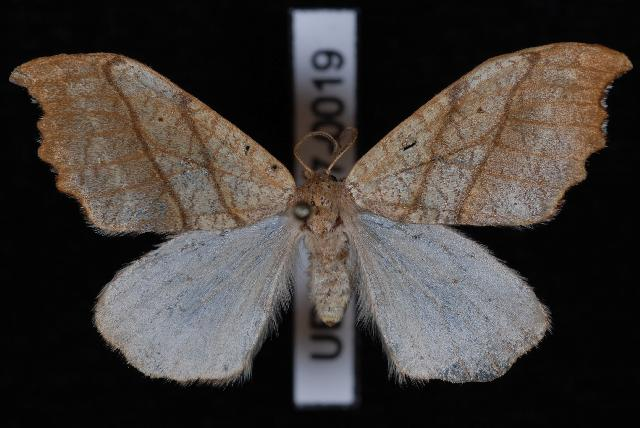

Scientific classification
- Kingdom: Animalia
- Phylum: Arthropoda
- Clade: Pancrustacea
- Class: Insecta
- Order: Lepidoptera
- Family: Drepanidae
- Genus: Falcaria
- Species: F. bilineata

Binomial name
- Falcaria bilineata (Packard, 1864)

Synonyms
- Edapteryx bilineata Packard, 1864; Drepana bilineata; Prionia levis Hudson, 1893; Drepana bilineata rampartensis Barnes & Benjamin, 1922; Drepana hudsoni Barnes & Benjamin, 1922

= Falcaria bilineata =

Species of hook-tip moth

Falcaria bilineata, the two-lined hooktip moth, is a moth in the family Drepanidae, that was first described by Packard in 1864. It is found in North America, where it has been recorded from Newfoundland to New Jersey, west to Oregon and north to British Columbia. The habitat consists of deciduous woodlands.

The wingspan is 28–33 mm. Adults are on wing from April to September in two generations per year.

The larvae feed on the leaves of Alnus and Betula species.

== Subspecies ==
- Falcaria bilineata bilineata
- Falcaria bilineata rampartensis (Barnes & Benjamin, 1922)
