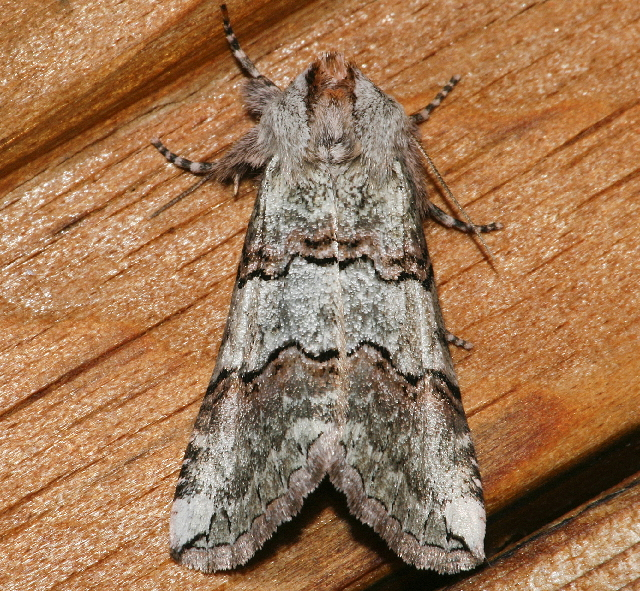

Scientific classification
- Domain: Eukaryota
- Kingdom: Animalia
- Phylum: Arthropoda
- Class: Insecta
- Order: Lepidoptera
- Family: Drepanidae
- Genus: Ceranemota
- Species: C. fasciata

Binomial name
- Ceranemota fasciata (Barnes & McDunnough, 1910)

Synonyms
- Bombycia fasciata Barnes & McDunnough, 1910

= Ceranemota fasciata =

Species of false owlet moth

Ceranemota fasciata is a moth in the family Drepanidae. It was described by William Barnes and James Halliday McDunnough in 1910. It is found in North America, where it has been recorded from British Columbia to northern California. It is also present in coastal southern Alaska. The habitat consists of coastal rainforests, mixed hardwood forests and montane riparian areas.

The larvae feed on Amelanchier alnifolia and Prunus species, including Prunus ilicifolia and Prunus virginiana.
