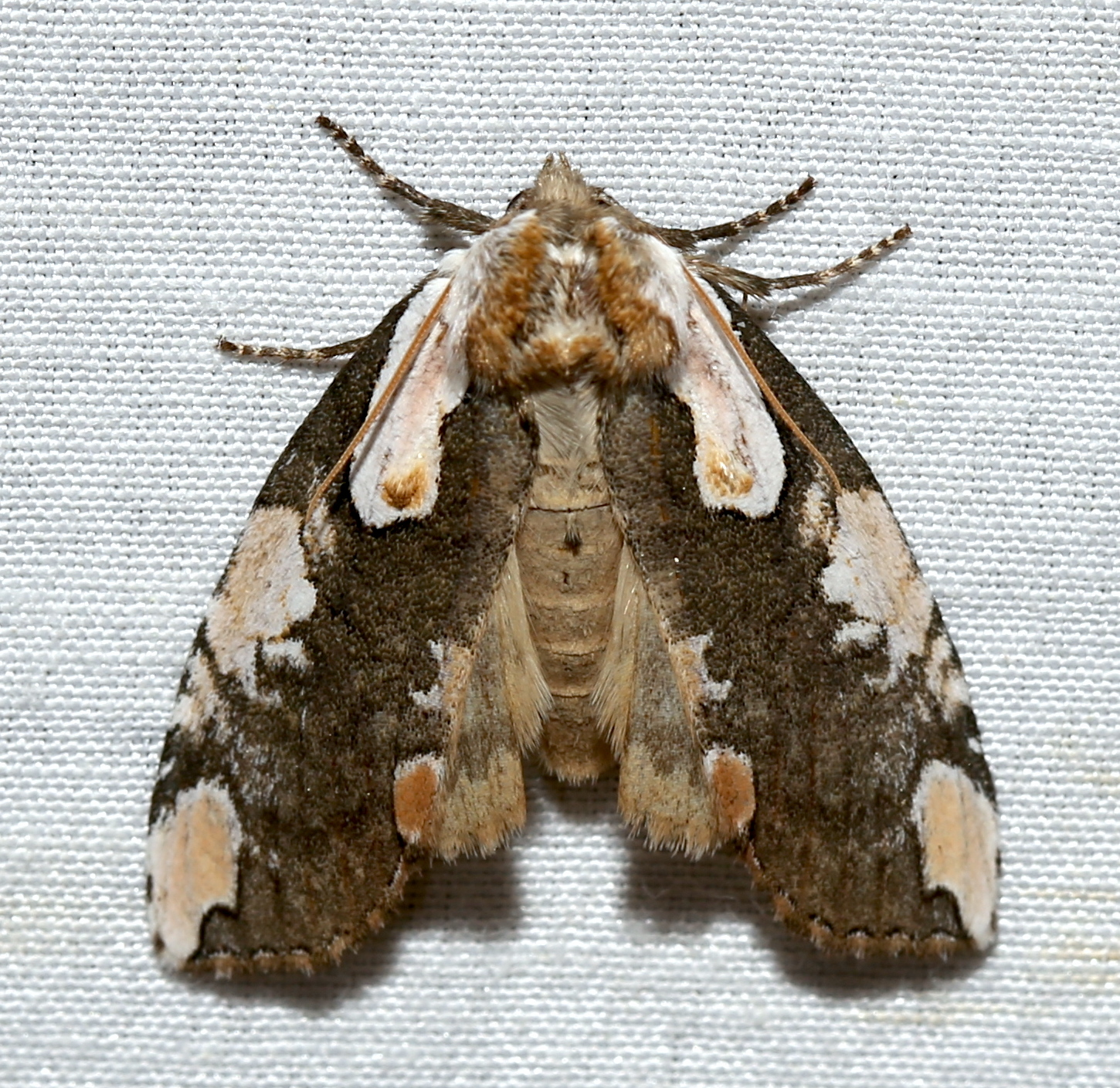

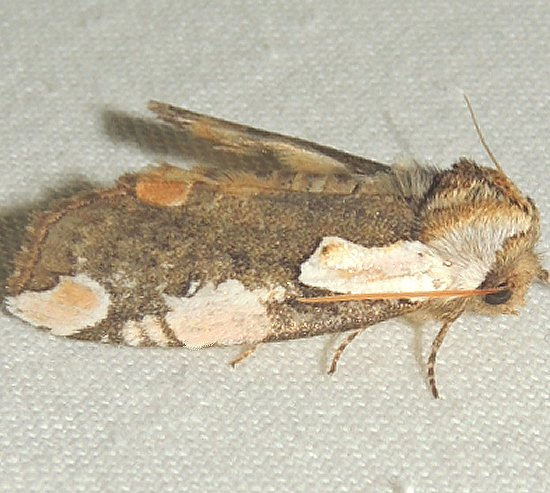

Scientific classification
- Kingdom: Animalia
- Phylum: Arthropoda
- Class: Insecta
- Order: Lepidoptera
- Family: Drepanidae
- Genus: Euthyatira
- Species: E. pudens

Binomial name
- Euthyatira pudens (Guenée, 1852)

Synonyms
- Thyatira pudens Guenée, 1852; Thyatira anticostiensis Grote, 1886; Euthyatira pennsylvanica Smith, 1902

= Euthyatira pudens =

Species of false owlet moth

Euthyatira pudens, the dogwood thyatirid moth or peach-blossom moth, is a moth of the family Drepanidae. The species was first described by Achille Guenée in 1852. It is found in North America, where it ranges across southern Canada, south to the Gulf of Mexico. The habitat consists of moist forests and riparian zones along creeks at low to middle elevations.

The wingspan is 40–45 mm.

The larvae feed on Cornus species.
