= Ceranemota partida =

Scientific classification
- Domain: Eukaryota
- Kingdom: Animalia
- Phylum: Arthropoda
- Class: Insecta
- Order: Lepidoptera
- Family: Drepanidae
- Genus: Ceranemota
- Species: C. partida

Binomial name
- Ceranemota partida J. F. G. Clarke, 1938

Species of false owlet moth

Ceranemota partida is a moth in the family Drepanidae. It was described by John Frederick Gates Clarke in 1938. It is found in North America, where it has been recorded from northern Colorado.

The wingspan is 36–41 mm. Adults have been recorded on wing in July, September and October.
