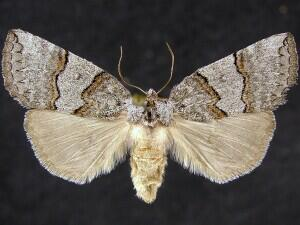

Scientific classification
- Domain: Eukaryota
- Kingdom: Animalia
- Phylum: Arthropoda
- Class: Insecta
- Order: Lepidoptera
- Family: Drepanidae
- Genus: Ceranemota
- Species: C. tearlei

Binomial name
- Ceranemota tearlei H. Edwards, 1888

Synonyms
- Gluphisia tearlei H. Edwards, 1873; Bombycia tearlei

= Ceranemota tearlei =

Species of false owlet moth

Ceranemota tearlei is a moth in the family Drepanidae. It was described by Henry Edwards in 1888. It is found in North America, where it has been recorded from British Columbia and central Alberta south to central California in the west and to Utah and Colorado in the Rocky Mountains. The hindwings are lighter grey with somewhat darker markings. Adults are on wing from late August to October in one generation per year.

The larvae feed on Amelanchier alnifolia, Sorbus scopulina and Salix species.
