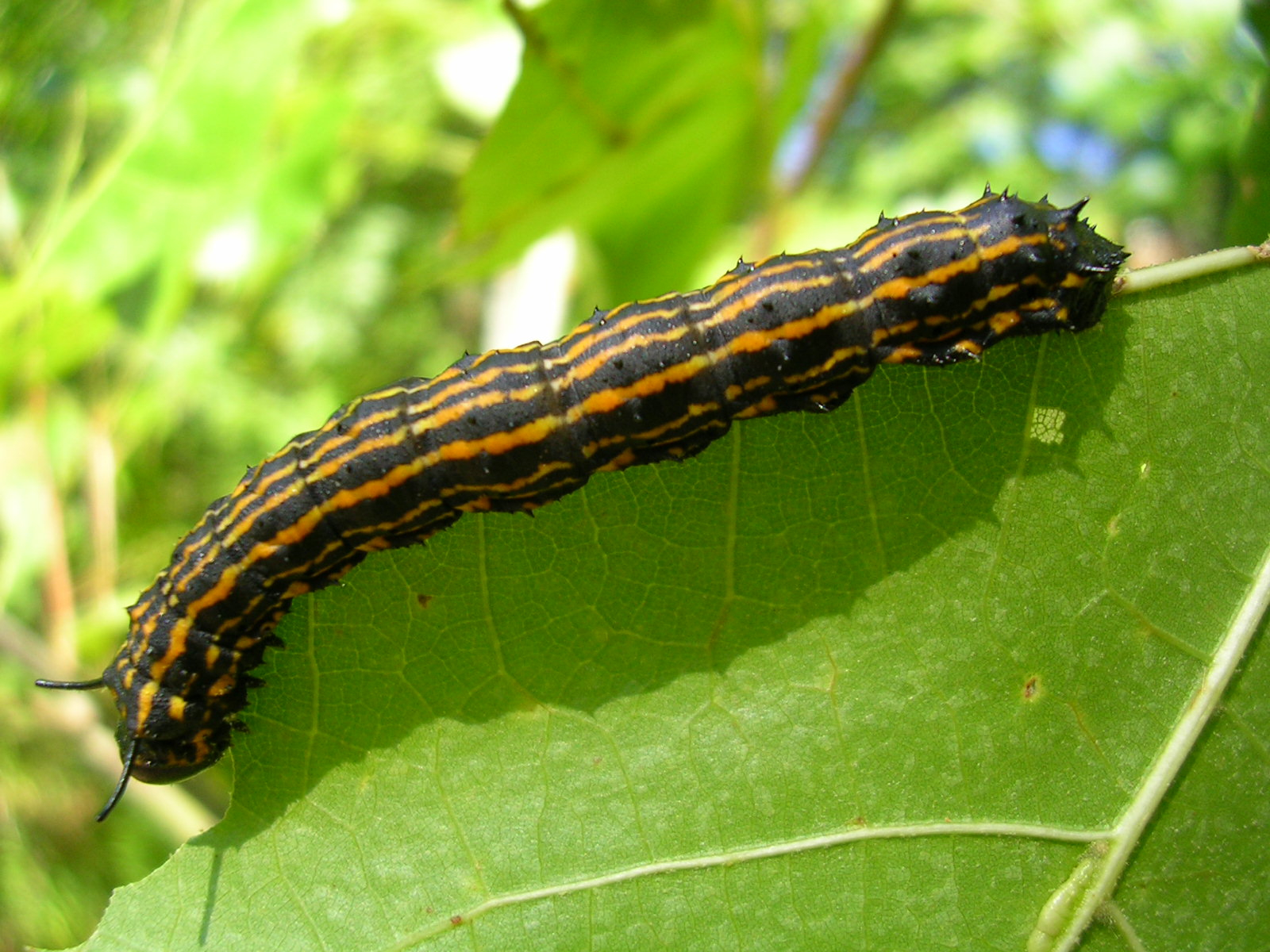
- Caterpillar
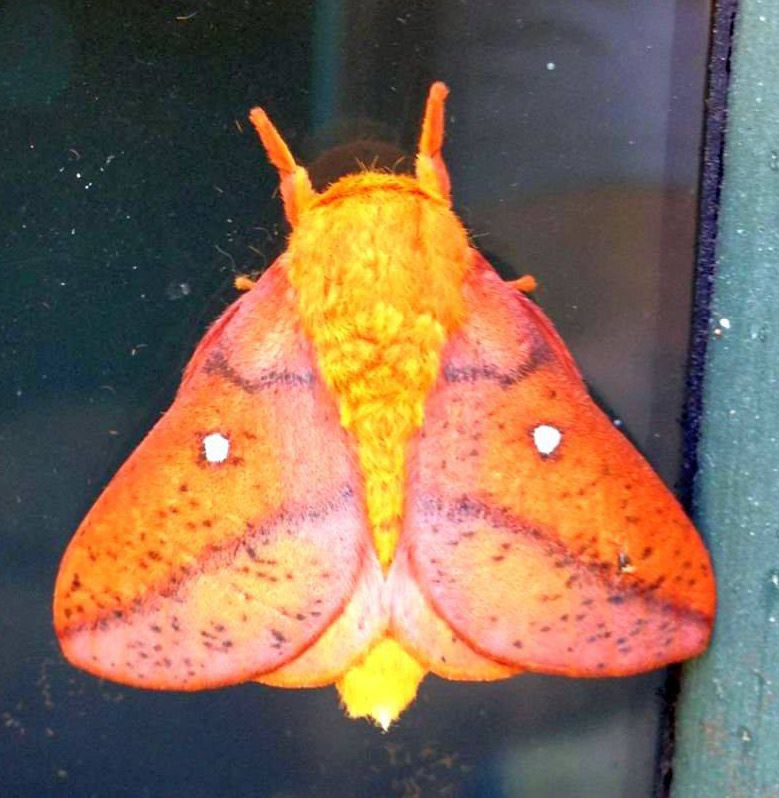
- Adult female

Conservation status
- Secure (NatureServe)

Scientific classification
- Kingdom: Animalia
- Phylum: Arthropoda
- Clade: Pancrustacea
- Class: Insecta
- Order: Lepidoptera
- Family: Saturniidae
- Genus: Anisota
- Species: A. senatoria

Binomial name
- Anisota senatoria (J. E. Smith, 1797)

Synonyms
- Phalaena senatoria Smith, 1797

= Anisota senatoria =

Orangestriped oakworm

Species of moth

Anisota senatoria, the orangestriped oakworm, also known as the orange-tipped oakworm, is a Nearctic moth of the family Saturniidae and subfamily Ceratocampinae. It is one of the more common Saturniids, reaching pest status occasionally in the northern parts of its range. As they are late-season feeders, however, they do little lasting damage to their hosts (most of the has been stored already). It is very similar to A. finlaysoni in southern Ontario and A. peigleri in the southern US. The species was first described by James Edward Smith in 1797.

== Range ==
The species lives in eastern North America, from the edge of the Great Plains to the east coast and from southern Ontario to central Georgia, Alabama and eastern Texas. They are found in northern Florida, but are more common in the north.

== Life cycle ==
There is only one brood a year.

=== Egg ===
Eggs are laid on the underside of leaves in large clusters. They take one to two weeks to hatch.

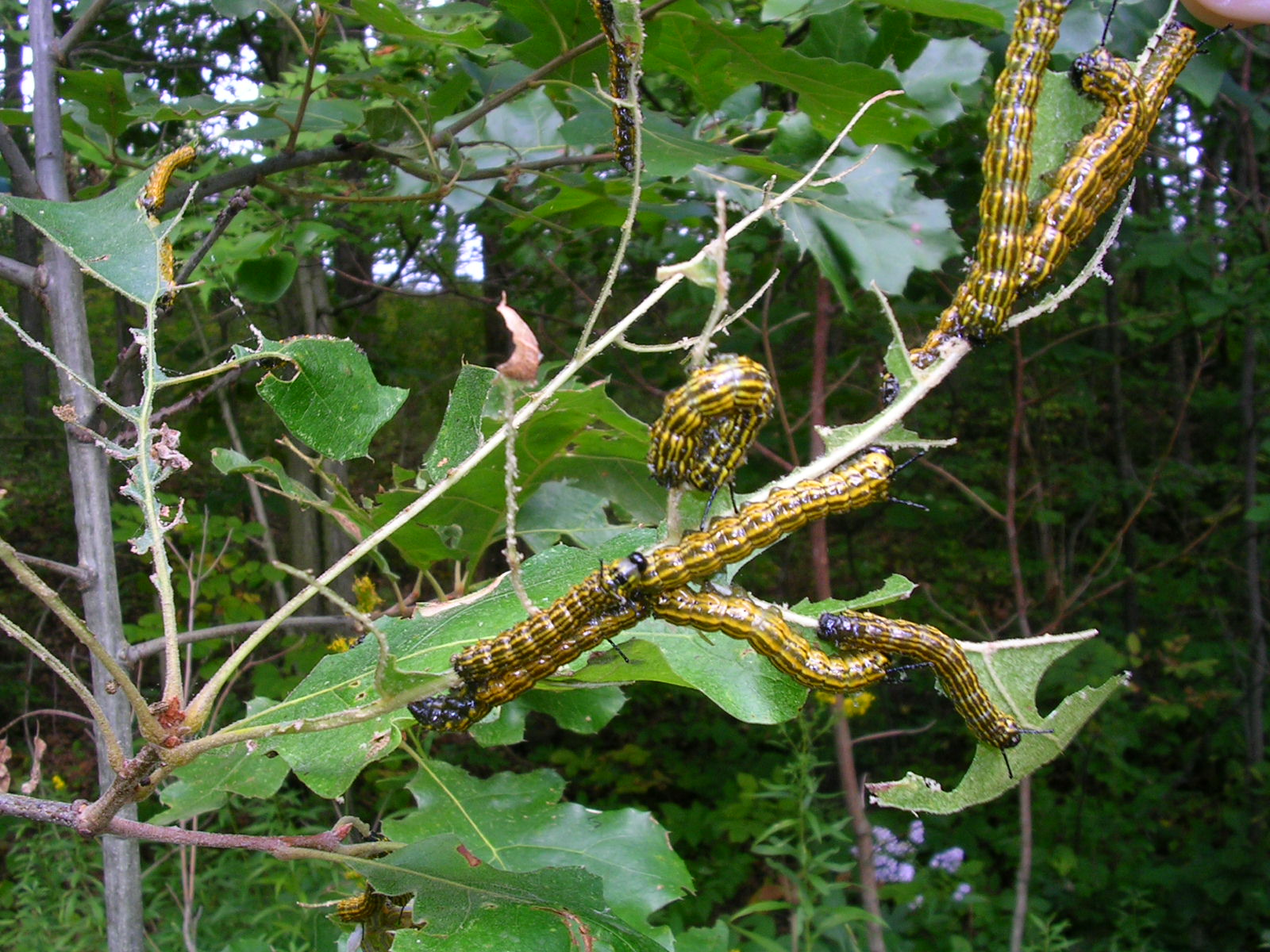
Cluster of larvae

=== Larva ===
Larvae are gregarious in the early instars and often do not disperse much in the late instars. The fifth instar is black with yellow-orange stripes on its side, and prominent spiny horns on the second segment of the thorax, about 5 cm long. Smaller spikes occur on the remaining segments. They feed on oaks in August and September.

=== Pupa ===
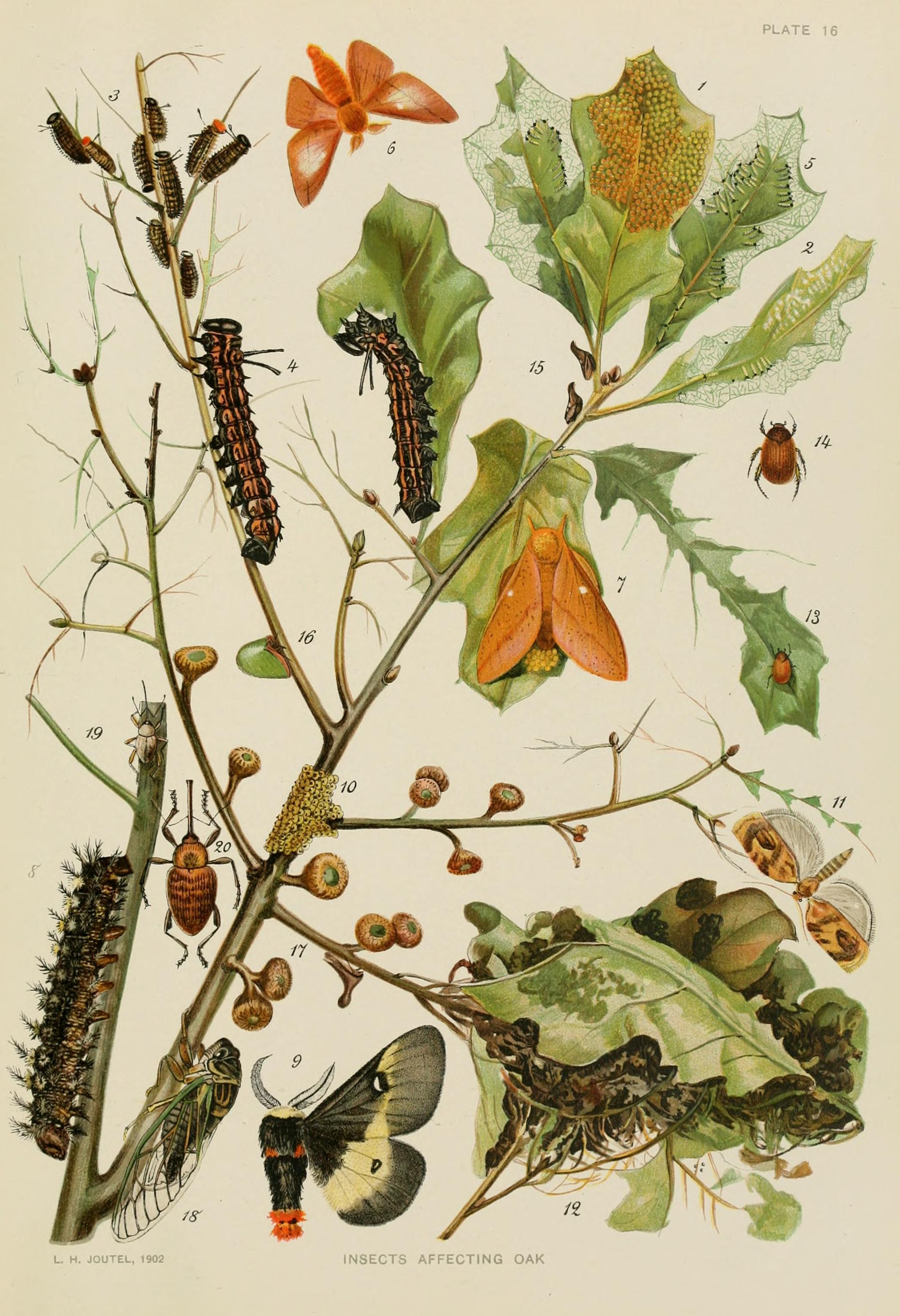
#1-7

As with most of this subfamily, when the caterpillars are ready to pupate, they burrow underground. Just before that, they may be seen wandering to locate pupation sites.

=== Adult ===
Adults emerge once a year to mate, in mid-June to mid-July. Mating occurs in the middle of the day, and females lay eggs late in the day. As with all of Saturniidae, the adults do not feed. Their mouthparts have been reduced. Females are stout bodied, yellow orange with a silver-white spot and faint black line across the forewing. There is also a line across the hindwing. Males are much smaller, and red brownish, but also have the white spot and pale lines. Both are speckled with black spots. Wingspan 3–5 cm.

== Food plants ==
Oaks, Quercus species, especially red oaks (Tuskes et al. 1996). Wagner (2005) also reports chestnut, birch, hazel, hickory and maple.
