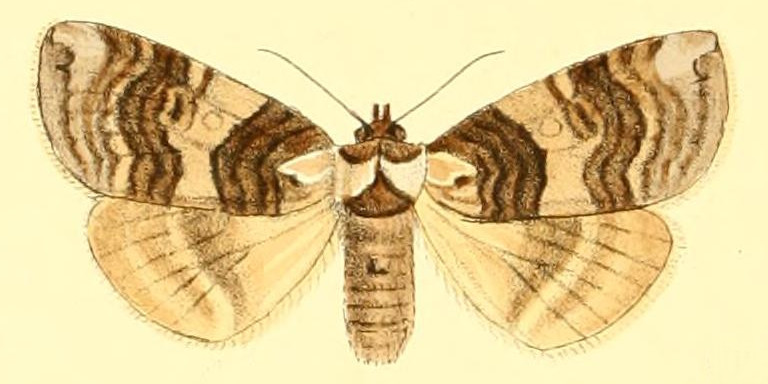

Scientific classification
- Domain: Eukaryota
- Kingdom: Animalia
- Phylum: Arthropoda
- Class: Insecta
- Order: Lepidoptera
- Family: Drepanidae
- Genus: Euthyatira
- Species: E. semicircularis

Binomial name
- Euthyatira semicircularis (Grote, 1881)

Synonyms
- Bombycia semicircularis Grote, 1881; Euthyatira tema Strecker, 1898; Bombycia griseor Barnes & McDunnough, 1910

= Euthyatira semicircularis =

Species of false owlet moth

Euthyatira semicircularis is a moth in the family Drepanidae. It is found in North America, where it has been recorded from British Columbia to California, east to Utah. The habitat consists of coastal rainforests and boreal forests.

The wingspan is 39–45 mm. Adults are on wing from May to July.
