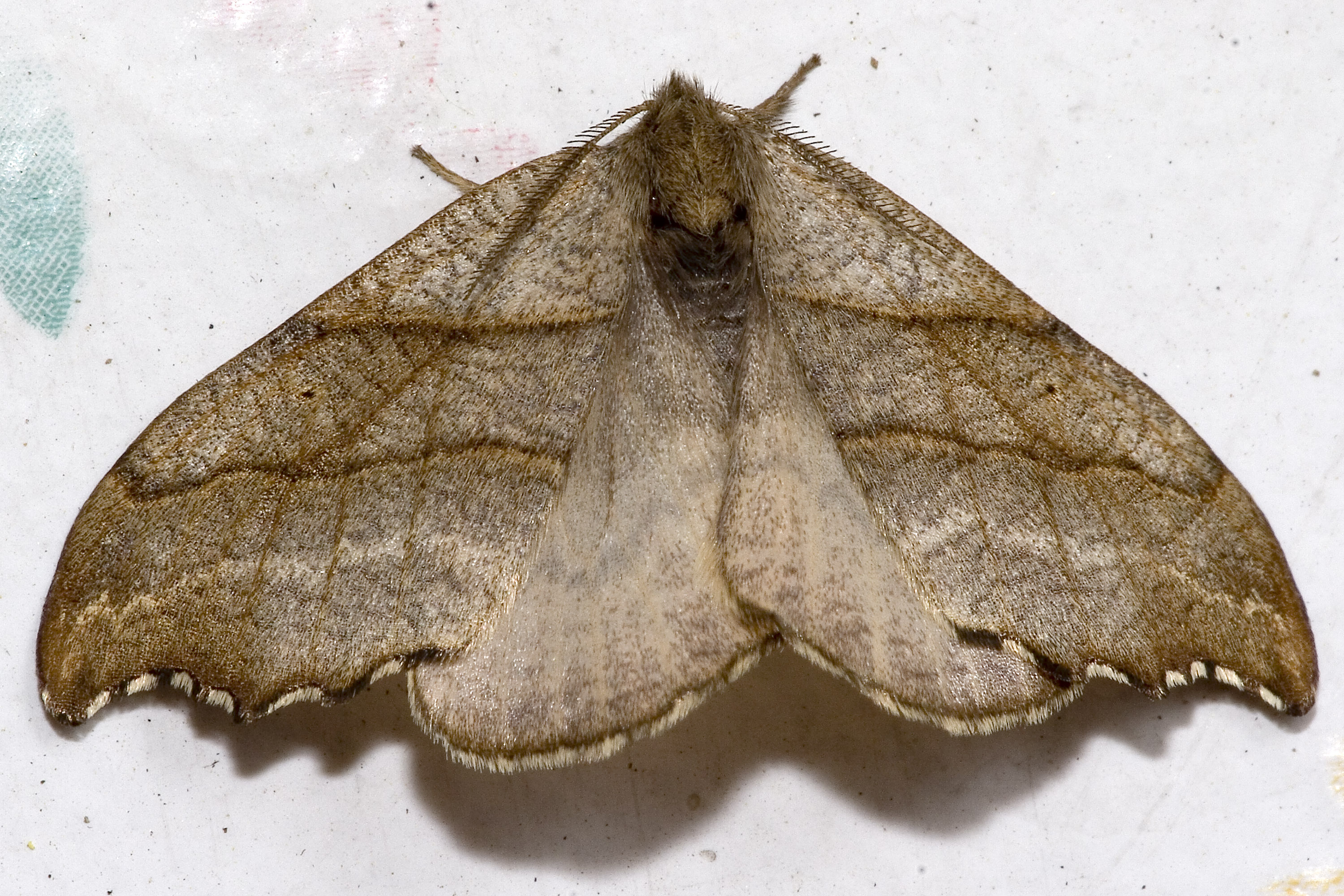
- Falcaria lacertinaria

Scientific classification
- Kingdom: Animalia
- Phylum: Arthropoda
- Clade: Pancrustacea
- Class: Insecta
- Order: Lepidoptera
- Family: Drepanidae
- Subfamily: Drepaninae
- Genus: Falcaria; Haworth, 1809

Synonyms
- Prionia Hübner, [1819]; Edapteryx Packard, 1864

= Falcaria (moth) =

Moth genus in family Drepanidae

Falcaria is a genus of moths belonging to the subfamily Drepaninae. It was first described by Adrian Hardy Haworth in 1809.

== Description ==
Its palpi are slender and do not reach beyond the frons. Antennae bipectinate (comb like on both sides) in both sexes to near the apex, the branches longer in the male than the female. The hind tibia is not dilated. Forewings produced at the apex. The outer margin usually excurved at middle. Vein 3 from close to angle of cell. Veins 7 to 9 stalked from before upper angle and vein 11 anastomosing (fusing) with vein 12. Hindwings with vein 3 from before angle of cell.

== Species ==
- Falcaria lacertinaria Linnaeus, 1758
- Falcaria bilineata Packard, 1864
