= Forest College and Research Institute, Hyderabad =

Educational institute in India

- Type: UG and PG College
- Established: 2016; 10 years ago
- Affiliations: Sri Konda Laxman Telangana State Horticultural University
- Dean: Dr. S. J. Asha, IFS
- Location: Mulugu, Siddipet Rd, Hyderabad, Telangana, 502279, India; 17.7170°N 78.6271°E
- Campus: Residential, co-educational
- Language: English
- Joint Director: Sri. B. VENKATESWAR RAO, ACF.
- Deputy Director: Smt. N. Kavitha, ACF
- Website: www.fcrits.in

The Forest College and Research Institute (FCRI) is an forestry research institute in Hyderabad, Telangana, India. Established in 2016 under Chief Minister of Telangana, the institute has trained students in the fields of forestry, biological sciences, environmental studies, social sciences, and Management sciences.

== History ==
FCRI was established in 2016 in India and has provided training for forestry students. The institute is organized into several departments, each specializing in a key aspect of forestry education and research:

== Dean ==
Dr. S. J. Asha, IFS Dean, FCRI Hyderabad

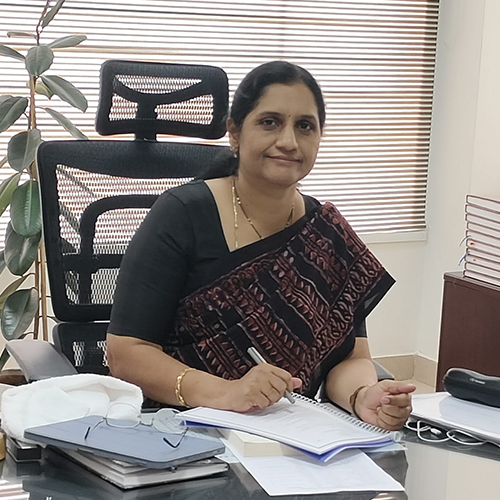
Dr. S. J. Asha, IFS Dean, FCRI Hyderabad

- Pursued B.Sc with botany, zoology and chemistry.
- Pursued M.Sc (anthropology) from Andhra University, Visakhapatnam
- Pursued Ph.D (Tribal Development and Poverty alleviation Programmes) from Andhra University, Visakhapatnam
- Joined in Forest Department as assistant conservator of forests during 1999. Later Got promotions as deputy conservator of forests, conservator forests and present working in the capacity as chief conservator of forests.
- Worked in different districts in the capacity of district forest officer, like in Khammam, Guntur, Viskhapatnam, Karimnagar, Sircilla etc.
- Worked as chief conservator of forests, Warangal Circle/ Warangal Zone.
- Worked as special commissioner, Haritha Haram in Rural Development Department for 4 and half Years. While working as special commissioner, HH, initiated a programme ‘One Gram Panchayat- One Nursery”. As result, we have 12,751 Nurseries in Telangana in all 12,751 Gram Panchayats.
- At present working as director, TS Forest Academy

== Awards and recognition ==
FCRI was recognized as A+ category institute in India. The following teaching and non-teaching staff were awarded certificates and cash prize for their meritorious service by the Telangana State Forest Department on 15th Aug 2020 – Dr. Kapil Sihag, assistant professor, Department of Forest Products & Utilization; Ms. P. Nikitha, assistant professor, Department of Basic and Social Sciences; Mr. Raghu, FSO; Mr. Murali Similarly, two other faculty members Mrs. NS Srinidhi, assistant professor (environmental sciences), Department of Forest Ecology and Climate Sciences and Dr. B. Sreedhar, associate professor, Department of Basic and Social Science have received meritorious certificates on the occasion of Republic day, i.e., on January 26, 2021.

== Departments ==
- Silviculture and Agroforestry
- Natural Resource Management and Conservation
- Wildlife and Habitat Management
- Basic & Social Sciences
- Forest Products & Utilization
- Tree Breeding & Improvement
- Forest Ecology & Climate Science
