= Monilia =

Monilia may refer to:

- an old spelling of Monilinia, a genus of fungus which may cause crop diseases, such as brown rot of fruit
- Moniliophthora roreri, a pathogen of cocoa and other species in or related to the genus Theobroma
- Candida albicans, a pathogenic yeast in humans and other mammals
- Strepsicrates, a genus of moth
- Monilia (Greece), an island group west of Euboea
