= Strepsiceros =

Strepsiceros may refer to:

- Strepsiceros, a genus of moths in the family Tortricidae, synonym of Strepsicrates
- Strepsiceros Rafinesque, 1815, a genus of mammals in the family Bovidae, synonym of Tragelaphus
- Strepsiceros Smith, 1827, a genus of mammals in the family Bovidae, synonym of Tragelaphus
