= Apatelodes cerrita =

Scientific classification
- Kingdom: Animalia
- Phylum: Arthropoda
- Class: Insecta
- Order: Lepidoptera
- Family: Apatelodidae
- Genus: Apatelodes
- Species: A. cerrita

Binomial name
- Apatelodes cerrita Draudt, 1929

Synonyms
- Apatelodes cessita

Species of moth

Apatelodes cerrita is a moth in the family Apatelodidae. It is found in Minas Gerais, Brazil.

The larvae have been recorded feeding on Eucalyptus urophylla.
