= Daripalli Ramaiah =

Indian social worker (1937–2025)

Darepalli Ramaiah
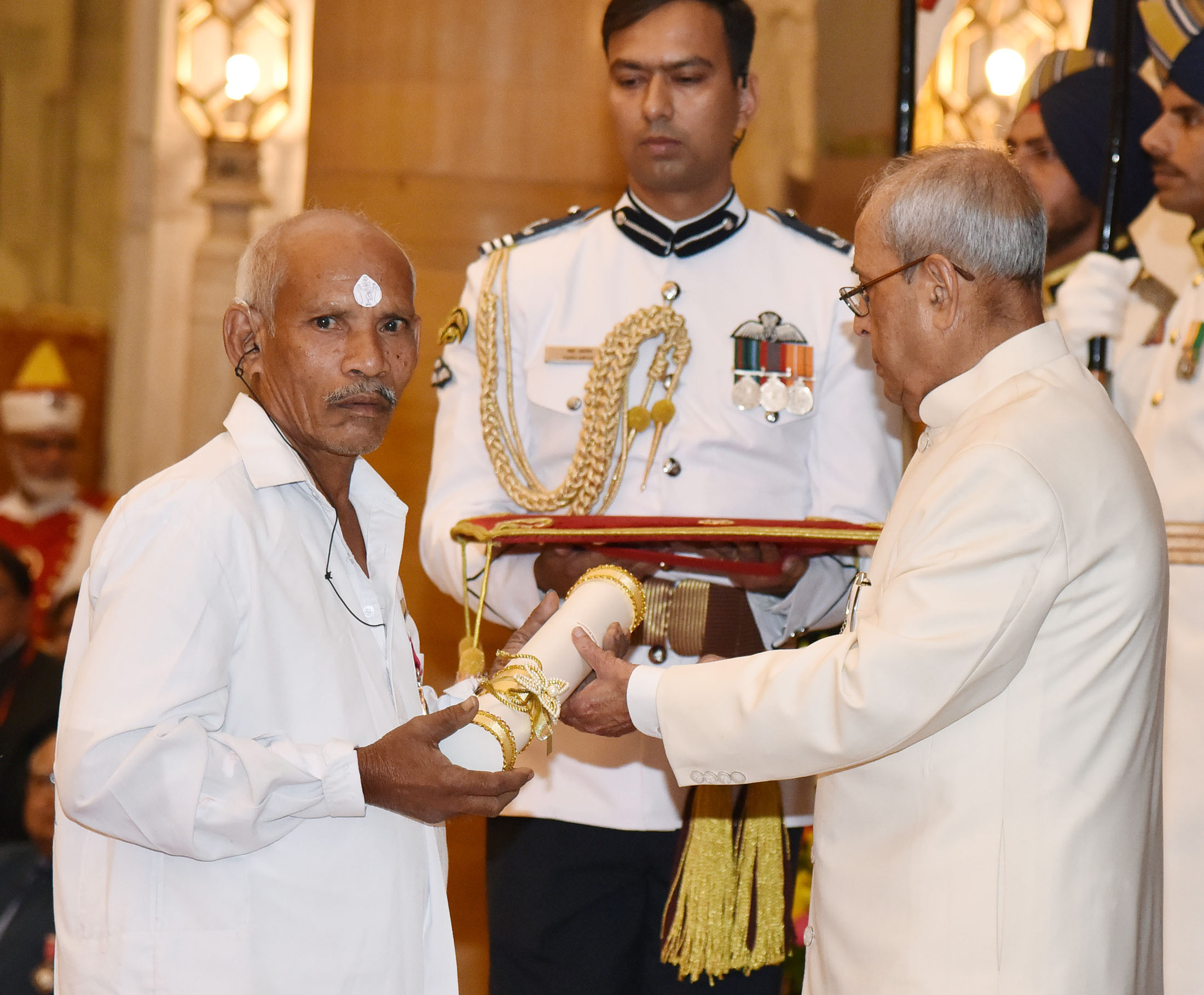
- The President, Shri Pranab Mukherjee presenting the Padma Shri Award to Shri Daripalli Ramaiah, at a Civil Investiture Ceremony, at Rashtrapati Bhavan, in New Delhi on March 30, 2017.
- Born: 1 July 1937; Reddypally, Khammam district, Hyderabad State, India
- Died: 12 April 2025 (aged 87); Khammam, Telangana, India
- Other names: Chetla Ramaiah; Vanajeevi Ramaiah
- Occupation: Tree conservationist
- Known for: Tree conservation

Daripalli Ramaiah (also known as Chetla Ramaiah, Vanajeevi Ramaiah; 1 July 1937 – 12 April 2025) was an Indian social worker known for his social forestry initiatives. He is the recipient of the Padma Shri award for the year 2017, for his invaluable contribution to extending tree cover. He is locally known as 'Chetla Ramaiah', (transl. Trees Ramaiah). On a mission to bring back the green cover, he is estimated to have planted more than 100 thousand saplings in and around Khammam district with a thrust on trees that provide shade, fruit-bearing plants, and biodiesel plants with assured benefit to future generations.

== Background ==
Ramaiah was born in Reddypally village in Khammam district, Hyderabad State (now in Telangana). He had schooling till 10th standard.

Ramaiah died from heart failure at his residence in Khammam, Telangana, on 12 April 2025, at the age of 87.

== Career ==
=== Social forestry campaign ===
As a campaigner of social forestry for more than five decades, Ramaiah himself could not recall when it all started exactly. He remembered vaguely that as a child, he often saw his mother saving the seeds of vegetable plants for the next growing season. Ever since he was a child, he was collecting seeds of native trees such as Sandalwood, Albizia saman, Ficus religiosa, Aegle marmelos, Neolamarckia cadamba and many more in his mission to cover every barren land with trees.

Ramaiah believed in seed as the solution to human well-being. "Of all the species that consider the Earth as their home, the most exalted is the human being. He supposedly has intellect, can think, can do and can get things done. Nature has bestowed her choicest blessings on this form of life. Therefore, we have a duty towards nature. Protect the nature; protect everything created by God, for the posterity", said Ramaiah. He sold his 3 acres of land to buy more saplings and seeds.

=== Modus operandi ===
Ramaiah planted trees and saplings in various locations. He transported saplings by bicycle and carried seeds. He was accompanied at times by his wife and students from local schools. Although he had no formal education, Ramaiah read books regarding trees and the planting process.

== Recognition and awards ==
The government of Andhra Pradesh gave him special recognition for his relentless drive and contribution towards the country. After the formation of Telangana, he continued to receive support from the Chief Minister Kalvakuntla Chandrashekar Rao's flagship programmes such as Telangana Ku Haritha Hāram (Green Garland). The objective of Haritha Hāram scheme is to increase the green cover from present 24% to 33% of the total geographical area of the state.

Year	Award
1995	Seva Award
2005	Vanamitra Award
2015	National Innovations and Outstanding Traditional Knowledge Award
2017	Padma Shri
