= Genetically modified tree =

Tree whose DNA has been modified using genetic engineering techniques

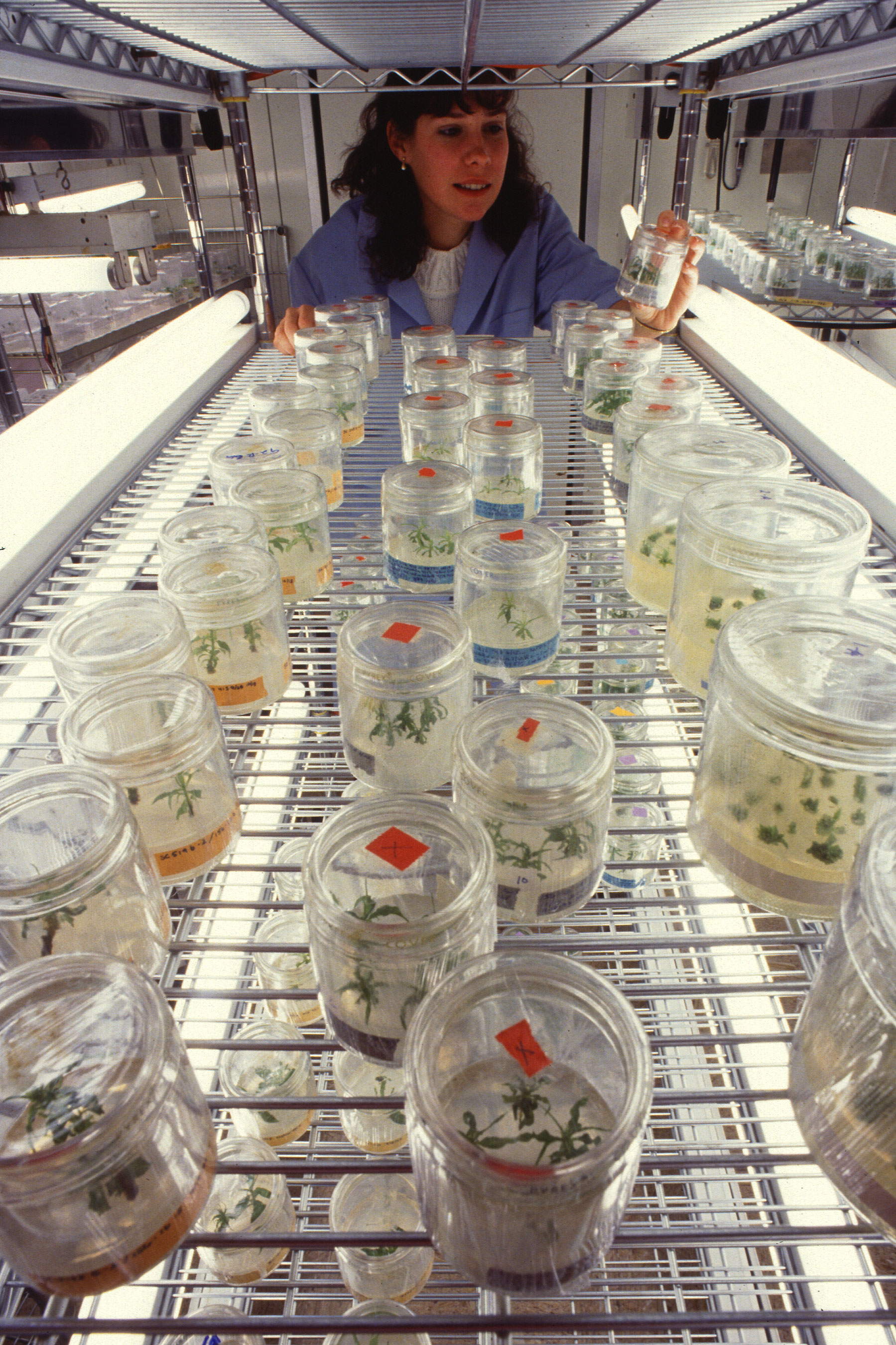
Technician checks on genetically modified peach and apple "orchards". Each dish holds experimental trees grown from lab-cultured cells to which researchers have given new genes. Source: USDA.

A genetically modified tree (GMt, GM tree, genetically engineered tree, GE tree or transgenic tree) is a tree whose DNA has been modified using genetic engineering techniques. In most cases the aim is to introduce a novel trait to the plant which does not occur naturally within the species. Examples include resistance to certain pests, diseases, environmental conditions, and herbicide tolerance, or the alteration of lignin levels in order to reduce pulping costs.

Genetically modified forest trees are not yet approved ("deregulated") for commercial use with the exception of insect-resistant poplar trees in China and genetically modified eucalyptus in Brazil. Several genetically modified forest tree species are undergoing field trials for deregulation, and much of the research is being carried out by the pulp and paper industry, primarily with the intention of increasing the productivity of existing tree stock. Certain genetically modified orchard tree species have been deregulated for commercial use in the United States including the papaya and plum. The development, testing and use of GM trees remains at an early stage in comparison to GM crops.

== Research ==
Research into genetically modified trees has been ongoing since 1988. Concerns surrounding the biosafety implications of releasing genetically modified trees into the wild have held back regulatory approval of GM forest trees. This concern is exemplified in the Convention on Biological Diversity's stance:

The Conference of the Parties, Recognising the uncertainties related to the potential environmental and socio-economic impacts, including long term and trans-boundary impacts, of genetically modified trees on global forest biological diversity, as well as on the livelihoods of indigenous and local communities, and given the absence of reliable data and of capacity in some countries to undertake risk assessments and to evaluate those potential impacts, recommends parties to take a precautionary approach when addressing the issue of genetically modified trees.

A precondition for further commercialization of GM forest trees is likely to be their complete sterility. Plantation trees remain phenotypically similar to their wild cousins in that most are the product of no more than three generations of artificial selection, therefore, the risk of transgene escape by pollination with compatible wild species is high. One of the most credible science-based concerns with GM trees is their potential for wide dispersal of seed and pollen. The fact that pine pollen travels long distances is well established, moving up to 3,000 kilometers from its source. Additionally, many tree species reproduce for a long time before being harvested. In combination these factors have led some to believe that GM trees are worthy of special environmental considerations over GM crops. Ensuring sterility for GM trees has proven elusive, but efforts are being made. While tree geneticist Steve Strauss predicted that complete containment might be possible by 2020, many questions remain.

== Proposed uses ==
GM trees under experimental development have been modified with traits intended to provide benefit to industry, foresters or consumers. Due to high regulatory and research costs, the majority of genetically modified trees in silviculture consist of plantation trees, such as eucalyptus, poplar, and pine.

=== Lignin alteration ===
Several companies and organizations (including ArborGen, GLBRC, ...) in the pulp and paper industry are interested in utilizing GM technology to alter the lignin content of plantation trees (particularly eucalyptus and poplar trees). It is estimated that reducing lignin in plantation trees by genetic modification could reduce pulping costs by up to $15 per cubic metre. Lignin removal from wood fibres conventionally relies on costly and environmentally hazardous chemicals. By developing low-lignin GM trees it is hoped that pulping and bleaching processes will require fewer inputs, therefore, mills supplied by low-lignin GM trees may have a reduced impact on their surrounding ecosystems and communities. However, it is argued that reductions in lignin may compromise the structural integrity of the plant, thereby making it more susceptible to wind, snow, pathogens and disease, which could necessitate pesticide use exceeding that on traditional plantations. This has proven correct, and an alternative approach followed by the University of Columbia was developed. This approach was to introduce chemically labile linkages instead (by inserting a gene from the plant Angelica sinensis), which allows the lignin to break down much more easy. Due to this new approach, the lignin from the trees not only easily breaks apart when treated with a mild base at temperatures of 100 degrees C, but the trees also maintained their growth potential and strength.

=== Frost tolerance ===
Genetic modification can allow trees to cope with abiotic stresses such that their geographic range is broadened. Freeze-tolerant GM eucalyptus trees for use in southern US plantations are currently being tested in open air sites with such an objective in mind. ArborGen, a tree biotechnology company and joint venture of pulp and paper firms Rubicon (New Zealand), MeadWestvaco (US) and International Paper (US) is leading this research. Until now the cultivation of eucalyptus has only been possible on the southern tip of Florida, freeze-tolerance would substantially extend the cultivation range northwards.

=== Reduced vigour ===
Orchard trees require a rootstock with reduced vigour to allow them to remain small. Genetic modification could allow the elimination of the rootstock, by making the tree less vigorous, hence reducing its height when fully mature. Research is being done into which genes are responsible for the vigour in orchard trees (such as apples, pears, ...).

=== Wood volume and accelerated growth ===
Scientists are developing trees that can accumulate more biomass and grow faster. In 2015, a genetically modified eucalyptus variety, the event H421, which provides greater wood volume and accelerated growth, received regulatory approval in Brazil for commercial release. The event, developed by FuturaGene, a biotechnology company owned by Suzano, a Brazilian pulp and paper company, was created in 2000 through the Agrobacterium tumefaciens mediated recombination technique, in which the cel1 gene, originating from the plant Arabidopsis thaliana, was inserted into the genome of a hybrid Eucalyptus grandis × E. urophylla. This gene encodes the enzyme endo-(1,4)-β-glucanase Cel1, whose function is related to cell wall remodeling during growth. Endoglucanases act by breaking bonds in regions of non-crystalline cellulose and in xyloglucans, structural components of the plant cell wall. This process reduces the cross-linking between these fibers, increasing the flexibility of the cell wall matrix and facilitating cell expansion and elongation. In A. thaliana, the Cel1 enzyme is highly expressed in rapidly growing young tissues and is essential for cell elongation. When transferred to eucalyptus, this mechanism provided greater cell wall plasticity, allowing the cells to expand further and accumulate more biomass. Stanley Hirsch, chief executive of FuturaGene has stated: "Our trees grow faster and thicker. We are ahead of everyone. We have shown we can increase the yields and growth rates of trees more than anything grown by traditional breeding."

Researchers at the University of Manchester's Faculty of Life Sciences modified two genes in poplar trees, called PXY and CLE, which are responsible for the rate of cell division in tree trunks. As a result, the trees are growing twice as fast as normal, and also end up being taller, wider and with more leaves.

=== Disease resistance ===
Ecologically motivated research into genetic modification is underway. There are ongoing schemes that aim to foster disease resistance in trees such as the American chestnut (see Chestnut blight) and the English elm (see Dutch elm disease) for the purpose of their reintroduction to the wild. Specific diseases have reduced the populations of these emblematic species to the extent that they are mostly lost in the wild. Genetic modification is being pursued concurrently with traditional breeding techniques in an attempt to endow these species with disease resistance.

=== Insect resistance ===
Bt eucalyptus is a GM variety developed to resist insect attacks, particularly from defoliating lepidopterans. These pests can significantly reduce productivity, with losses of up to 40% per year, in addition to compromising wood quality and pulp production. The company FuturaGene inserted into eucalyptus three genes from the bacterium Bacillus thuringiensis (Bt). This bacterium produces insecticidal proteins called Cry, which specifically target the intestines of certain caterpillars. In the case of Bt eucalyptus, the genes Cry1Ab, Cry1Bb, and Cry2Aa were introduced, ensuring broad protection against defoliators. The Bt event 1521K059 was approved by CTNBio in 2023.

=== Herbicide tolerance ===
FuturaGene developed and obtained approval in Brazil for the commercial use of genetically modified eucalyptus tolerant to the herbicide glyphosate. These GM events received the cp4-epsps gene, which expresses a version of the enzyme 5-enolpyruvylshikimate-3-phosphate synthase (EPSPS), associated with the synthesis of the essential amino acids phenylalanine, tyrosine, and tryptophan, from the CP4 strain of the bacterium Agrobacterium tumefaciens, which is not inhibited by glyphosate.

== Current uses ==
=== Poplars in China ===
In 2002 China's State Forestry Administration approved GM poplar trees for commercial use. Subsequently, 1.4 million Bt (insecticide) producing GM poplars were planted in China. They were planted both for their wood and as part of China's 'Green Wall' project, which aims to impede desertification. Reports indicate that the GM poplars have spread beyond the area of original planting and that contamination of native poplars with the Bt gene is occurring. There is concern with these developments, particularly because the pesticide producing trait may impart a positive selective advantage on the poplar, allowing it a high level of invasiveness.

=== GM Eucalyptus in Brazil ===
In 2015, a genetically modified eucalyptus variety, the event H421, which provides greater wood volume, received regulatory approval in Brazil for commercial release by the National Technical Commission on Biosafety (CTNBio), becoming the first genetically modified eucalyptus approved in the world. Subsequently, other GM eucalyptus varieties were also approved in the country, incorporating traits of pest resistance and herbicide tolerance.

==== Stacked traits ====
FuturaGene developed GM varieties that combine multiple traits of interest. In 2024, CTNBio approved event H421 × 955P082 × 1521K059, obtained through conventional crossing of these respective varieties, which combines higher productivity, glyphosate herbicide tolerance, and insect resistance.

== See also ==
- Genetically modified crops
- Genetically modified food
- Genetically modified organisms
- Plantations
- Regulation of the release of genetic modified organisms
- Tree breeding
