= Genetically modified eucalyptus =

Genetically modified tree

A genetically modified eucalyptus (GM eucalyptus) is an eucalyptus whose genetic material has been altered through genetic engineering techniques, conferring desirable traits such as increased biomass, accelerated growth, pest resistance, and herbicide tolerance. In 2015, a GM eucalyptus variety, event H421, which provides higher wood volume and faster growth, received regulatory approval in Brazil for commercial release by the National Technical Biosafety Commission (CTNBio), becoming the first genetically modified eucalyptus approved in the world. Subsequently, other GM eucalyptus varieties have also been approved, incorporating traits for pest resistance and herbicide tolerance. While other countries conduct research on genetically modified trees, Brazil is the only one to have released them for commercial-scale cultivation.

== Examples of transgenic eucalyptus ==
=== H421 eucalyptus ===
In 2015, a genetically modified eucalyptus variety, the event H421, which provides greater wood volume and accelerated growth, received regulatory approval in Brazil for commercial release. The event, developed by FuturaGene, a biotechnology company owned by Suzano, a Brazilian pulp and paper company, was created in 2000 through the Agrobacterium tumefaciens mediated recombination technique, in which the cel1 gene, originating from the plant Arabidopsis thaliana, was inserted into the genome of a hybrid Eucalyptus grandis × E. urophylla. This gene encodes the enzyme endo-(1,4)-β-glucanase Cel1, whose function is related to cell wall remodeling during growth. Endoglucanases act by breaking bonds in regions of non-crystalline cellulose and in xyloglucans, structural components of the plant cell wall. This process reduces the cross-linking between these fibers, increasing the flexibility of the cell wall matrix and facilitating cell expansion and elongation. In A. thaliana, the Cel1 enzyme is highly expressed in rapidly growing young tissues and is essential for cell elongation. When transferred to eucalyptus, this mechanism provided greater cell wall plasticity, allowing the cells to expand further and accumulate more biomass. GM eucalyptus can increase wood productivity by 30 to 40% and reduce the harvest cycle from seven to about five and a half years, in addition to expanding the use of biomass for paper, bioenergy, biofuels, and other products.

=== Glyphosate-tolerant eucalyptus ===
FuturaGene developed and obtained approval in Brazil for the commercial use of genetically modified eucalyptus tolerant to the herbicide glyphosate. These GM events received the cp4-epsps gene, which expresses a version of the enzyme 5-enolpyruvylshikimate-3-phosphate synthase (EPSPS), associated with the synthesis of the essential amino acids phenylalanine, tyrosine, and tryptophan, from the CP4 strain of the bacterium Agrobacterium tumefaciens, which is not inhibited by glyphosate. The 751K032 characterized the first event of this type, approved in Brazil in 2021.

=== Bt eucalyptus ===
Bt eucalyptus is a GM variety developed to resist insect attacks, particularly from defoliating lepidopterans. These pests can significantly reduce productivity, with losses of up to 40% per year, in addition to compromising wood quality and pulp production. The company FuturaGene inserted into eucalyptus three genes from the bacterium Bacillus thuringiensis (Bt). This bacterium produces insecticidal proteins called Cry, which specifically target the intestines of certain caterpillars. In the case of Bt eucalyptus, the genes Cry1Ab, Cry1Bb, and Cry2Aa were introduced, ensuring broad protection against defoliators. The Bt event 1521K059 was approved by CTNBio in 2023.

=== Frost tolerance eucalyptus ===
Freeze-tolerant GM eucalyptus trees for use in southern US plantations are currently being tested in open air sites with such an objective in mind. ArborGen, a tree biotechnology company and joint venture of pulp and paper firms Rubicon (New Zealand), MeadWestvaco (US) and International Paper (US) is leading this research. Until now the cultivation of eucalyptus has only been possible on the southern tip of Florida, freeze-tolerance would substantially extend the cultivation range northwards.

=== Stacked traits ===
FuturaGene developed GM varieties that combine multiple traits of interest. In 2024, CTNBio approved event H421 × 955P082 × 1521K059, obtained through conventional crossing of these respective varieties, which combines higher productivity, glyphosate herbicide tolerance, and insect resistance.

== Controversy ==
Genetically modified eucalyptus developed in Brazil exhibit a biosafety profile equivalent to that of conventional varieties. The introduced proteins, such as Cry proteins, have shown high specificity against lepidopteran pests and did not exhibit relevant toxicity or allergenicity in conducted tests. Trials with non-target organisms, including bees, earthworms, springtails, and aquatic invertebrates, also indicated no adverse effects. Comparative analyses have shown that genetically modified varieties behave similarly to conventional ones, providing productive benefits without introducing significant new risks to human or animal health or the environment. However, the introduction of glyphosate tolerance requires careful attention, as intensive herbicide use can accelerate the selection of resistant weeds, necessitating integrated management strategies.

Studies on gene flow in genetically modified eucalyptus indicate that fertilization of other eucalyptus trees at distances greater than 600 meters is unlikely. Thus, there is no significant risk of long-distance gene transfer due to pollen dispersal by wind. Silva et al. (2017) monitored an experimental field between 2010 and 2014 and did not observe any natural emergence of seedlings from seeds produced by the trees without human intervention, reinforcing the understanding that eucalyptus has low invasiveness potential in competitive tropical environments. In the same study, pollen-mediated gene flow was observed to be more intense at short distances (up to 16% between 3 and 15 m), decreasing rapidly to about 3% at 240 m and remaining at low levels up to 650 m. Silva and Abrahão (2020) evaluated pollen dispersal over greater distances, up to 1,592 m, and found transgenic offspring in very low proportions beyond 300 m (only two individuals, at 400 and 857 m), with zero rates beyond that. Although they confirmed effective crossings in compatible trees with synchronized flowering, they also did not detect the natural emergence of seedlings.

Bees and eucalyptus maintain a close, long-standing, and well-known relationship. Toxicological studies conducted in both laboratory and field settings have assessed the impact of genetically modified eucalyptus pollen on bees. The results show that modified eucalyptus does not affect the organization, morphology, or mortality of Apis bees, nor the mortality of native bees. Furthermore, analyses of honey, pollen, and propolis found no differences in the quality of products from areas cultivated with modified eucalyptus compared to conventional eucalyptus.

Critics oppose genetically modified crops for various reasons, including ecological concerns and economic issues arising from the fact that these organisms are subject to intellectual property law. The detection of transgenes in honey can have socioeconomic impacts for honey farmers, preventing them from labeling their products as organic or agroecological and increasing the risk of trade barriers for export. Field studies indicate that genetically modified eucalyptus does not consume more water than conventional eucalyptus. Research on soil arthropod diversity and microbiota has shown no significant differences between areas with modified and conventional eucalyptus. Since the abundance of these organisms depends on the physical, chemical, and hydrological properties of the soil, the results suggest that transgenic eucalyptus does not alter soil hydrology nor negatively impact indicator organisms.
