= Strepsicrates rhothia =

Scientific classification
- Kingdom: Animalia
- Phylum: Arthropoda
- Class: Insecta
- Order: Lepidoptera
- Family: Tortricidae
- Genus: Strepsicrates
- Species: S. rhothia

Binomial name
- Strepsicrates rhothia (Meyrick, 1910)

Synonyms
- Spilonota rhothia Meyrick, 1910; Spilonota rhotia Viette, 1951

Species of moth

Strepsicrates rhothia is a species of moth of the family Tortricidae first described by Edward Meyrick in 1910. It is found in Taiwan, Sri Lanka, India, the Democratic Republic of the Congo, Ghana, Madagascar, Mauritius and South Africa.

== Larval food plants ==
The caterpillar is a pest on several economically important plant crops of several families.

- Psidium guajava
- Psidium cattleianum
- Syzygium cumini
- Eugenia parkeri
- Eugenia jambolana
- Callistemon citrinus
- Coriaria nepalensis
- Woodfordia fruticosa
- Eucalyptus citriodora
- Eucalyptus alba
- Eucalyptus camaldulensis
- Eucalyptus deglupta
- Eucalyptus grandis
- Eucalyptus eremophylla
- Eucalyptus paniculata
- Eucalyptus propinqua
- Eucalyptus raveretiana
- Eucalyptus robusta
- Eucalyptus saligna
- Eucalyptus tereticornis
- Eucalyptus torelliana
- Eucalyptus urophylla
- Mangifera indica
- Melaleuca cajuputi
- Melaleuca leucadendra
- Melaleuca species
- Derris species
