= Apatelodes bruckneri =

Scientific classification
- Kingdom: Animalia
- Phylum: Arthropoda
- Clade: Pancrustacea
- Class: Insecta
- Order: Lepidoptera
- Family: Apatelodidae
- Genus: Apatelodes
- Species: A. bruckneri

Binomial name
- Apatelodes bruckneri Draudt, 1929

Synonyms
- Apatelodes brückneri Draudt, 1929; Apatelodes brueckneri Draudt, 1929; Hygrochroa brueckneri (Draudt, 1929)

Species of moth

Apatelodes bruckneri is a species of moth in the family Apatelodidae.
