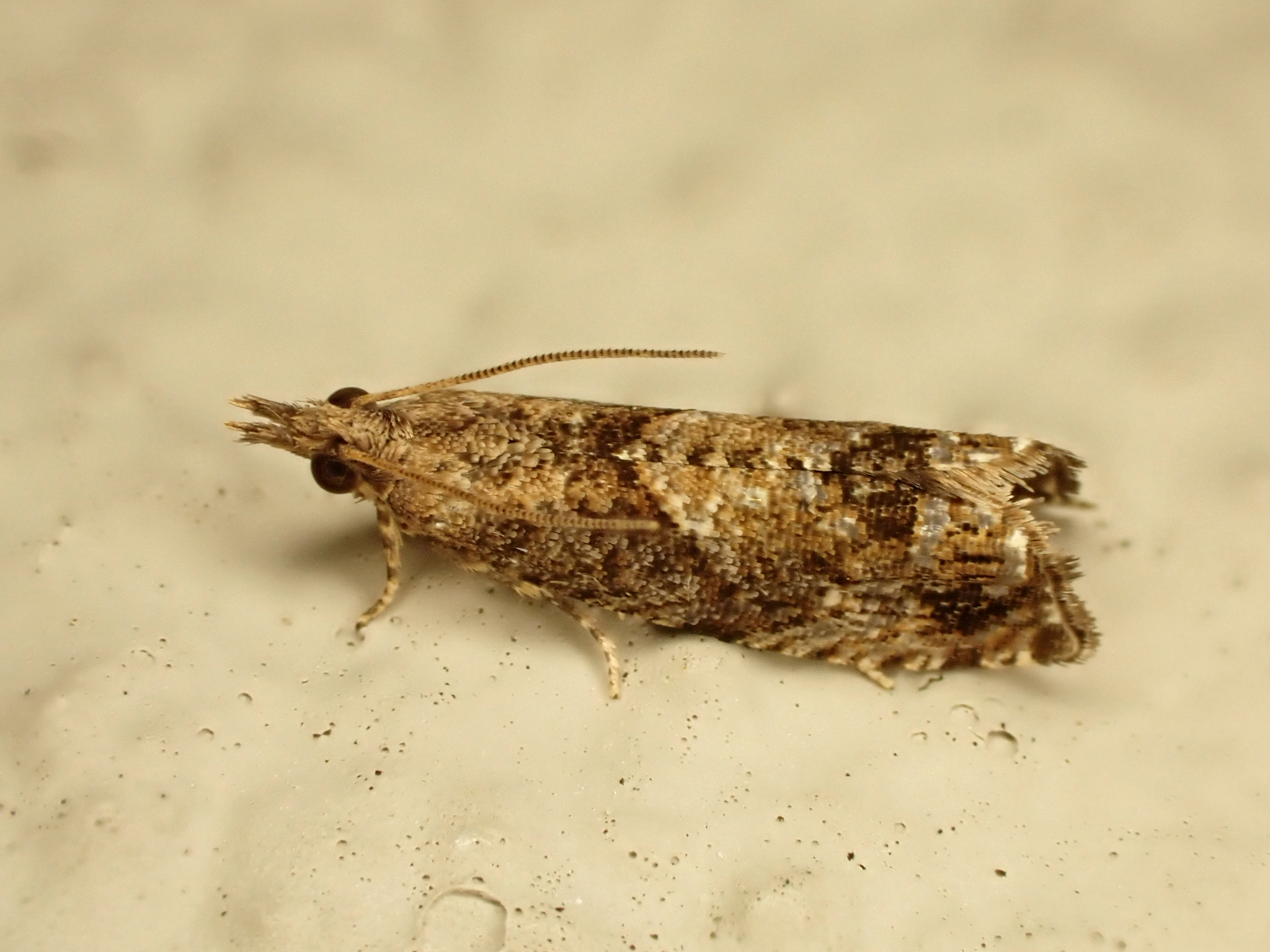

Scientific classification
- Kingdom: Animalia
- Phylum: Arthropoda
- Class: Insecta
- Order: Lepidoptera
- Family: Tortricidae
- Genus: Strepsicrates
- Species: S. sideritis

Binomial name
- Strepsicrates sideritis (Meyrick, 1905)

Synonyms
- Noteraula sideritis Meyrick, 1905; Strepsicrates chaophila Meyrick, 1909

= Strepsicrates sideritis =

Species of moth endemic to New Zealand

Strepsicrates sideritis is a species of moth in the family Tortricidae first described by Edward Meyrick in 1905. This species is endemic to New Zealand. The classification of this moth within the genus Strepsicrates is regarded as unsatisfactory and in need of revision. As such this species is currently also known as Strepsicrates (s.l.) sideritis.

== Host species ==
The larval hosts of this species of moth is likely dry leaf litter.
