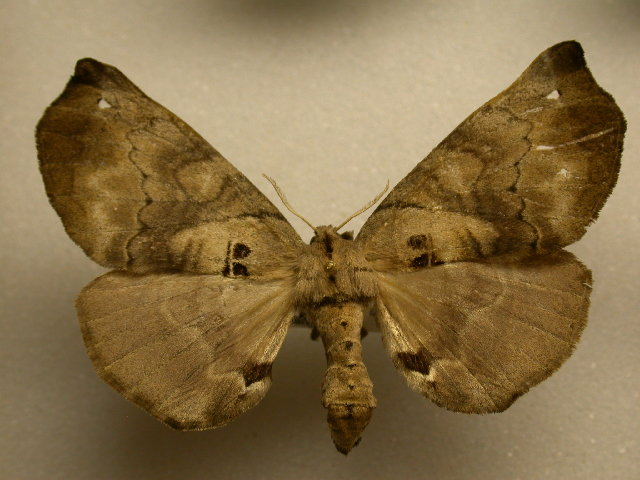

Scientific classification
- Kingdom: Animalia
- Phylum: Arthropoda
- Class: Insecta
- Order: Lepidoptera
- Family: Apatelodidae
- Genus: Apatelodes
- Species: A. palma

Binomial name
- Apatelodes palma H. Druce, 1900

Synonyms
- Hygrochroa palma

= Apatelodes palma =

Species of moth

Apatelodes palma is a moth in the family Apatelodidae first described by Herbert Druce in 1900. It is found in Costa Rica and Mexico.
