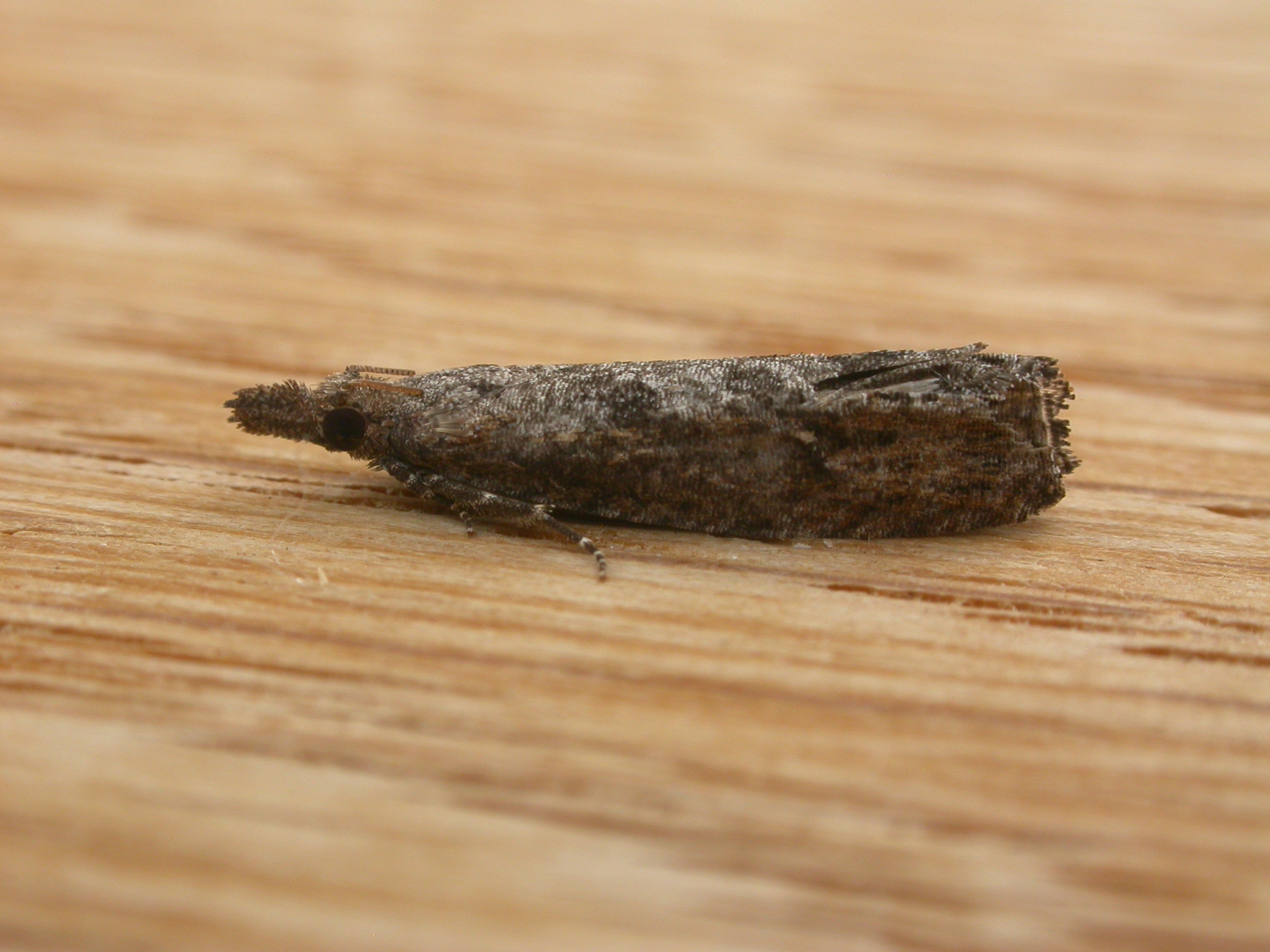
- Strepsicrates infensa

Scientific classification
- Domain: Eukaryota
- Kingdom: Animalia
- Phylum: Arthropoda
- Class: Insecta
- Order: Lepidoptera
- Family: Tortricidae
- Tribe: Eucosmini
- Genus: Strepsicrates; Meyrick, 1888

Synonyms
- Monilia Walker, 1866; Phthenolophus Busck, 1910; Phthinolophus Dyar, 1903; Sterpsiceros Razowski, 1977 (misspelling); Strepsiceros Meyrick, 1881 (preoccupied)

= Strepsicrates =

Genus of tortrix moths

Strepsicrates is a genus of moths belonging to the subfamily Olethreutinae of the family Tortricidae.

Some species have been moved between this genus and Stictea.

== Species ==
- Strepsicrates brachytycha (Turner, 1946)
- Strepsicrates ebenocosma (Turner, 1946)
- Strepsicrates holotephras (Meyrick, 1924)
- Strepsicrates infensa (Meyrick, 1911)
- Strepsicrates melanotreta (Meyrick, 1910)
- Strepsicrates penechra (Diakonoff, 1989)
- Strepsicrates poliophora Bradley, 1962
- Strepsicrates prolongata (Meyrick, 1932)
- Strepsicrates rhothia (Meyrick, 1910)
- Strepsicrates semicanella (Walker, 1866)
- Strepsicrates sideritis (Meyrick, 1905)
- Strepsicrates smithiana Walsingham, 1891
- Strepsicrates tetropsis (Busck, 1913)
- Strepsicrates thyellopis (Meyrick, 1926)
- Strepsicrates transfixa (Turner, 1946)
- Strepsicrates trimaura Diakonoff, 1985

== See also ==
- List of Tortricidae genera
