= Apatelodes gladys =

Scientific classification
- Kingdom: Animalia
- Phylum: Arthropoda
- Class: Insecta
- Order: Lepidoptera
- Family: Apatelodidae
- Genus: Apatelodes
- Species: A. gladys

Binomial name
- Apatelodes gladys Dyar, 1918

Species of moth

Apatelodes gladys is a moth in the family Apatelodidae. It is found in Mexico.
