= Apatelodes lacetania =

Scientific classification
- Kingdom: Animalia
- Phylum: Arthropoda
- Class: Insecta
- Order: Lepidoptera
- Family: Apatelodidae
- Genus: Apatelodes
- Species: A. lacetania

Binomial name
- Apatelodes lacetania H. Druce, 1898

Synonyms
- Apatelodes hiantha Dyar

Species of moth

Apatelodes lacetania is a moth in the family Apatelodidae. It is found in Mexico.
