= Seed orchard =

Site where forest seeds are produced

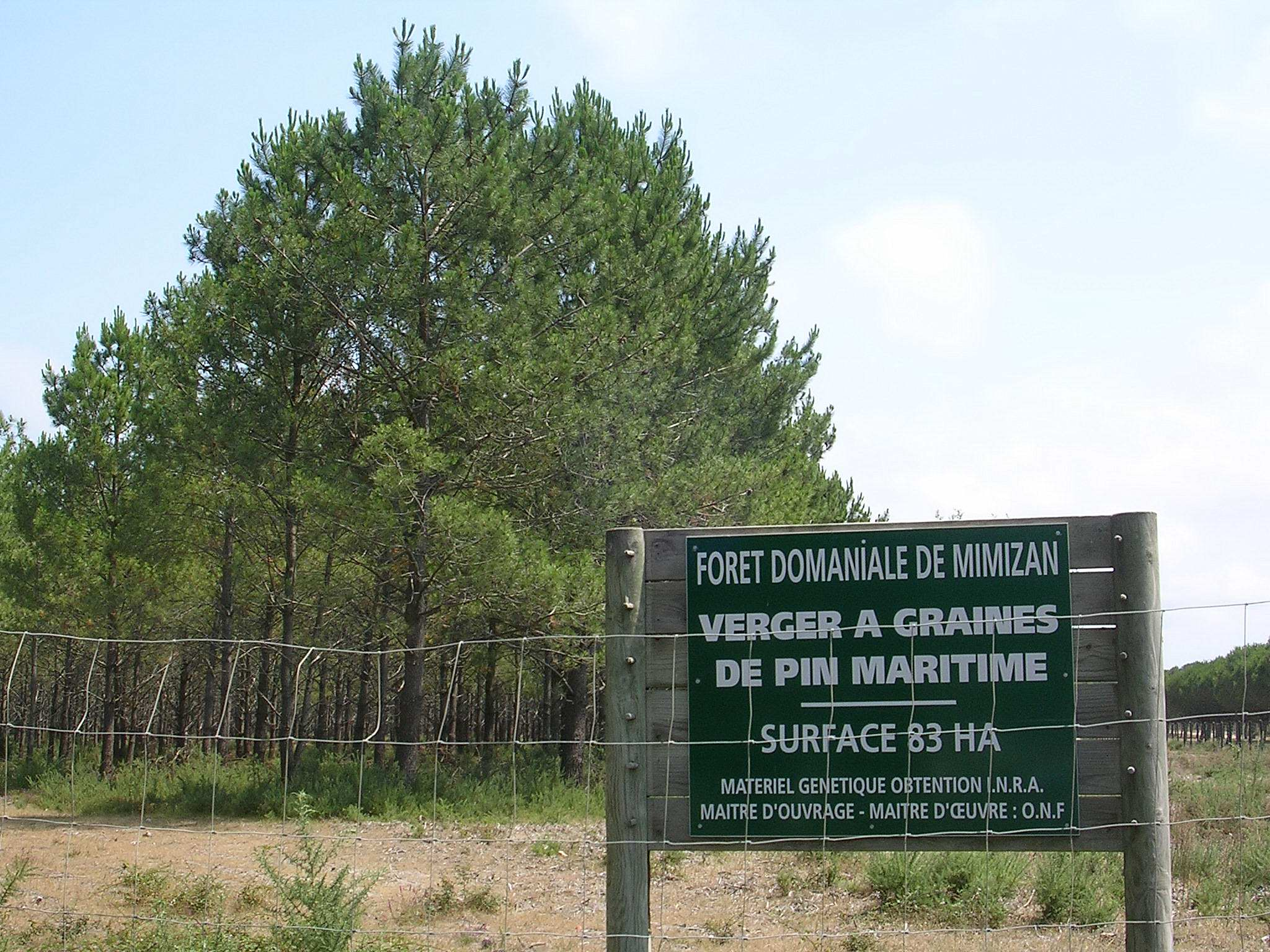
Seed orchard in Mimizan, Landes, France

A seed orchard is an intensively-managed plantation of specifically arranged trees for the mass production of genetically improved seeds to create plants, or seeds for the establishment of new forests.

== General ==
Seed orchards are a common method of mass-multiplication for transferring genetically improved material from breeding populations to production populations (forests) and in this sense are often referred to as "multiplication" populations. A seed orchard is often composed of grafts (vegetative copies) of selected genotypes, but seedling seed orchards also occur mainly to combine orchard with progeny testing.

Seed orchards are the strong link between breeding programs and plantation establishment. They are designed and managed to produce seeds of superior genetic quality compared to those obtained from seed production areas, seed stands, or unimproved stands.

== Material and connection with breeding population ==
In first generation seed orchards, the parents usually are phenotypically selected trees. In advanced generation seed orchards, the seed orchards are harvesting the benefits generated by tree breeding and the parents may be selected among the tested clones or families. It is efficient to synchronise the productive live cycle of the seed orchards with the cycle time of the breeding population. In the seed orchard, the trees can be arranged in a design to keep the related individuals or cloned copies apart from each other. Seed orchards are the delivery vehicle for genetic improvement programs where the trade-off between genetic gain and diversity is the most important concern. The genetic gain of seed orchard crops depends primarily on the genetic superiority of the orchard parents, the gametic contribution to the resultant seed crops, and pollen contamination from outside seed orchards.

== Genetic diversity of seed orchard crops ==
Seed production and gene diversity is an important aspect when using improved materials like seed orchard crops. Seed orchards crops derive generally from a limited number of trees. But if it is a common wind-pollinated species much pollen will come from outside the seed orchard and widen the genetic diversity. The genetic gain of the first generation seed orchards is not great and the seed orchard progenies overlap with unimproved material. Gene diversity of the seed crops is greatly influenced by the relatedness (kinship) among orchard parents, the parental fertility variation, and the pollen contamination.

== Management and practical examples ==
Seed orchards are usually managed to obtain sustainable and large crops of seeds of good quality. To achieve this, the following methods are commonly applied: orchards are established on flat surface sites with southern exposure (better conditions for orchard maintenance and for seed production), no stands of the same species in close proximity (avoid strong pollen contamination), sufficient area to produce and be mainly pollinated with their own pollen cloud, cleaning the corridors between the rows, fertilising, and supplemental pollination. The genetic quality of seed orchards can be improved by genetic thinning and selective harvesting. In plantation forestry with southern yellow pines in the United States, almost all plants originate from seed orchards and most plantations are planted in family blocks, thus the harvest from each clone is kept separate during seed processing, plant production and plantation.

== Recent seed orchard research ==
- The optimal balance between the effective number of clones (diversity, status number, gene diversity) and genetic gain is achieved by making clonal contributions (number of ramets) proportional (linearly dependent) to the genetic value ("linear deployment"). This is dependent on several assumptions, one of them that the contribution to the seed orchard crop is proportional to the number of ramets. But the more ramets the larger the share of the pollen is lost depending on ineffective self-pollination. But even considering this, the linear deployment is a very good approximation. It was thought that increasing the gain is always accompanied by a loss in effective number of clones, but it has shown that both can be obtained in the same time by genetic thinning using the linear deployment algorithm if applied to some rather unbalanced seed orchards. Relatedness among clones is more critical for diversity than inbreeding.
- The clonal variation in expected seed set has been compiled for 12 adult clonal seed orchards of Scots pine. The seed set ability is not that drastic among clones as has been shown in other investigations which are probably less relevant for actual seed production of Scots pine.
- The correlations of cone set for Scots pine in a clonal archive was not well correlated with that of the same clones in seed orchards. Thus it does not seem meaningful to increase seed set by choosing clones with a good seed set.
- As supporting tree breeding make advances, new seed orchards will be genetically better than old ones. This is a relevant factor for the economic lifetime of a seed orchard. Considerations for Swedish Scots pine suggested an economic lifetime of 30 years, which is less than the current lifetime.
- Seed orchards for important wind pollinated species start to produce seeds before the seed orchard trees start to produce much pollen. Thus all or most of the pollen parents are outside the seed orchard. Calculations indicates that seed orchard seeds are still to be expected to a superior alternative to older and more mature seed orchards or stand seeds. Advantage of early seeds like absence of selfing or related matings and high diversity are positive factors in the early seeds.
- Swedish conifers orchards with tested clones could have 20–25 clones with more ramets from the better and less from the worse so effective ramet number is 15–18. Higher clone number results in unneeded loss of genetic gain. Lower clone numbers can still be better than existing alternatives. For southern pines in United States it may be optimal with half as many clones.
- When forest tree breeding proceeds to advanced generations the candidates to seed orchards will be related and the question to what degree related clones can be tolerated in seed orchards become urgent. Gene diversity seems to be a more important consideration than inbreeding. If the number of candidates have at least eight times as much diversity (status number) as required for the seed orchard relations are not limiting and clones can be deployed as usual but restricting for half and full sibs, but if the candidate population has a lower diversity more sophisticated algorithms are needed.

== See also ==
- Double-pair mating
- Grafting
- Plant nursery
