= Stictea coriariae =

Scientific classification
- Domain: Eukaryota
- Kingdom: Animalia
- Phylum: Arthropoda
- Class: Insecta
- Order: Lepidoptera
- Family: Tortricidae
- Genus: Stictea
- Species: S. coriariae

Binomial name
- Stictea coriariae (Oku, 1974)

Synonyms
- Strepsicrates coriariae Oku, 1974

Species of moth

Stictea coriariae is a species of moth of the family Tortricidae. It is found in China (Henan, Fujian, Hubei, Hunan, Guangdong, Guangxi, Guizhou, Gansu, Sichuan), Russia and Japan.

The wingspan is 15–18 mm.

The larvae feed on Eucalyptus robusta, Melaeuca leucadendra, Melaeuca quinqueneruia, Tristania conferta, Fristania conferta, Rhodomytus tomentosa and Coriaria japonica.

== Subspecies ==
- Stictea coriariae coriariae (Japan, China: Henan, Fujian, Hubei, Hunan, Guangdong, Guangxi, Guizhou, Gansu)
- Stictea coriariae grisescens Kuznetsov, 1979 (Russia, China: Sichuan)
