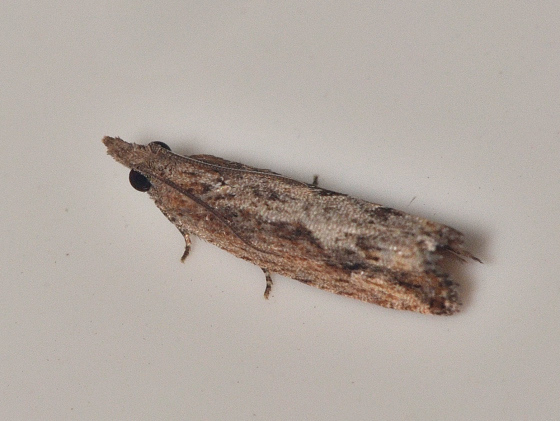

Scientific classification
- Domain: Eukaryota
- Kingdom: Animalia
- Phylum: Arthropoda
- Class: Insecta
- Order: Lepidoptera
- Family: Tortricidae
- Genus: Strepsicrates
- Species: S. smithiana

Binomial name
- Strepsicrates smithiana Walsingham, 1891

Synonyms
- Phthinolophus indentanus Dyar, 1903; Spilonota imminens Meyrick, 1917

= Strepsicrates smithiana =

Smith's strepsicrates moth

Species of insect

Strepsicrates smithiana, the bayberry leaftier moth or Smith's strepsicrates moth, is a moth of the family Tortricidae. It was first described by Lord Walsingham in 1891. It is native to southern North America, south to South America, including Florida, Texas, Georgia, Dominican Republic, Puerto Rico, Cuba and the Galapagos Islands. It was introduced to Oahu, Hawaii, in 1955 to aid in the control of Myrica faya.

The wingspan is 14–15 mm.

The larvae feed on Myrica cerifera, Myrica faya and Psidium guajava. They roll the leaves of their host plant.
