= Apatelodes princeps =

Scientific classification
- Kingdom: Animalia
- Phylum: Arthropoda
- Clade: Pancrustacea
- Class: Insecta
- Order: Lepidoptera
- Family: Apatelodidae
- Genus: Apatelodes
- Species: A. princeps

Binomial name
- Apatelodes princeps Dognin, 1911

Species of moth

Apatelodes princeps is a moth in the family Apatelodidae. It is found in Colombia.
