= Apatelodes verena =

Scientific classification
- Kingdom: Animalia
- Phylum: Arthropoda
- Class: Insecta
- Order: Lepidoptera
- Family: Apatelodidae
- Genus: Apatelodes
- Species: A. verena

Binomial name
- Apatelodes verena H. Druce, 1898

Synonyms
- Apatelodes horina Schaus, 1920

Species of moth

Apatelodes verena is a moth in the family Apatelodidae. It was first described by Herbert Druce in 1898. It is found in Veracruz, Mexico.
