= Apatelodes milma =

Scientific classification
- Kingdom: Animalia
- Phylum: Arthropoda
- Class: Insecta
- Order: Lepidoptera
- Family: Apatelodidae
- Genus: Apatelodes
- Species: A. milma

Binomial name
- Apatelodes milma Dyar, 1912

Species of moth

Apatelodes milma is a moth in the family Apatelodidae. It is found in Mexico (Veracruz).
