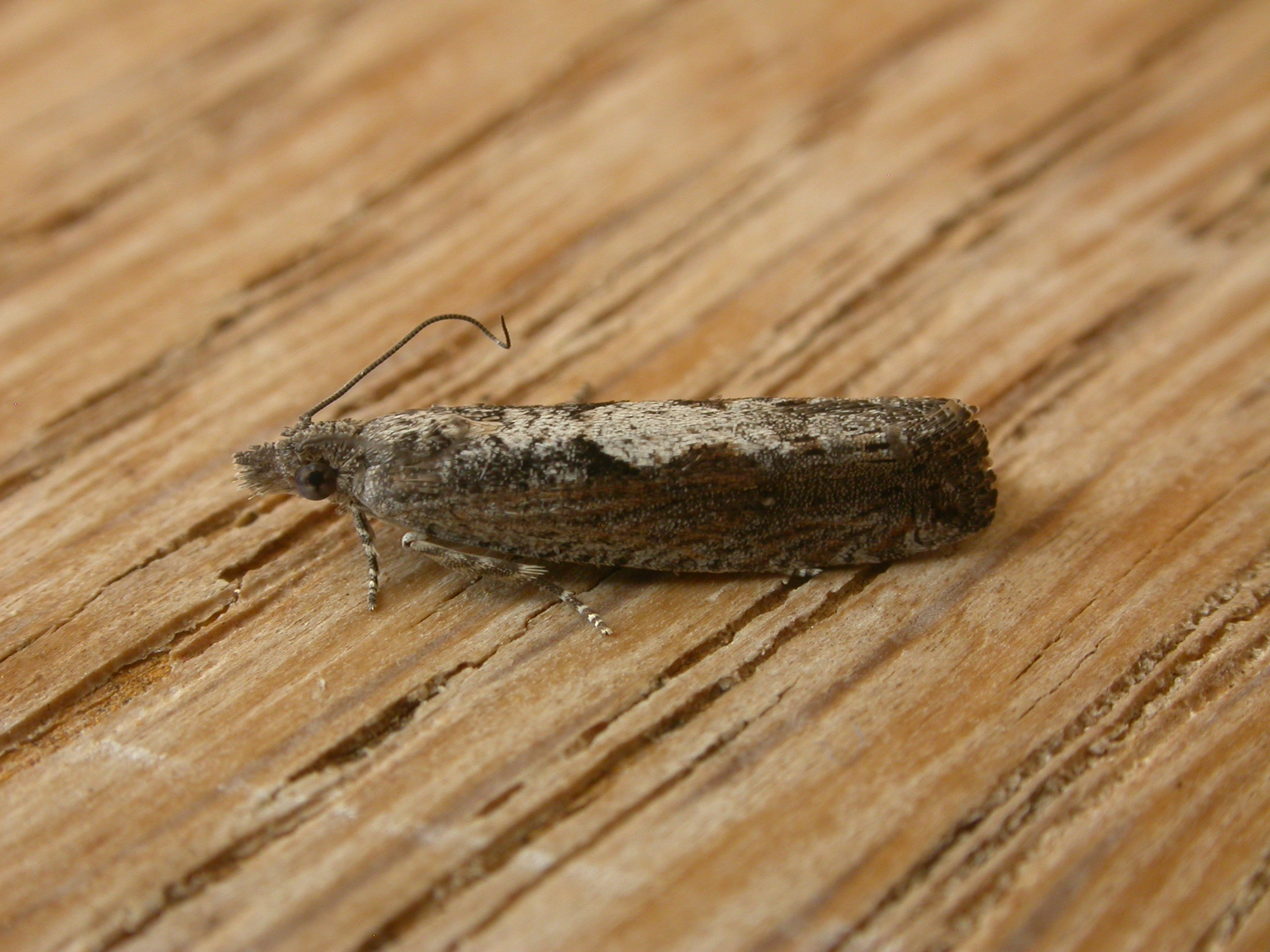

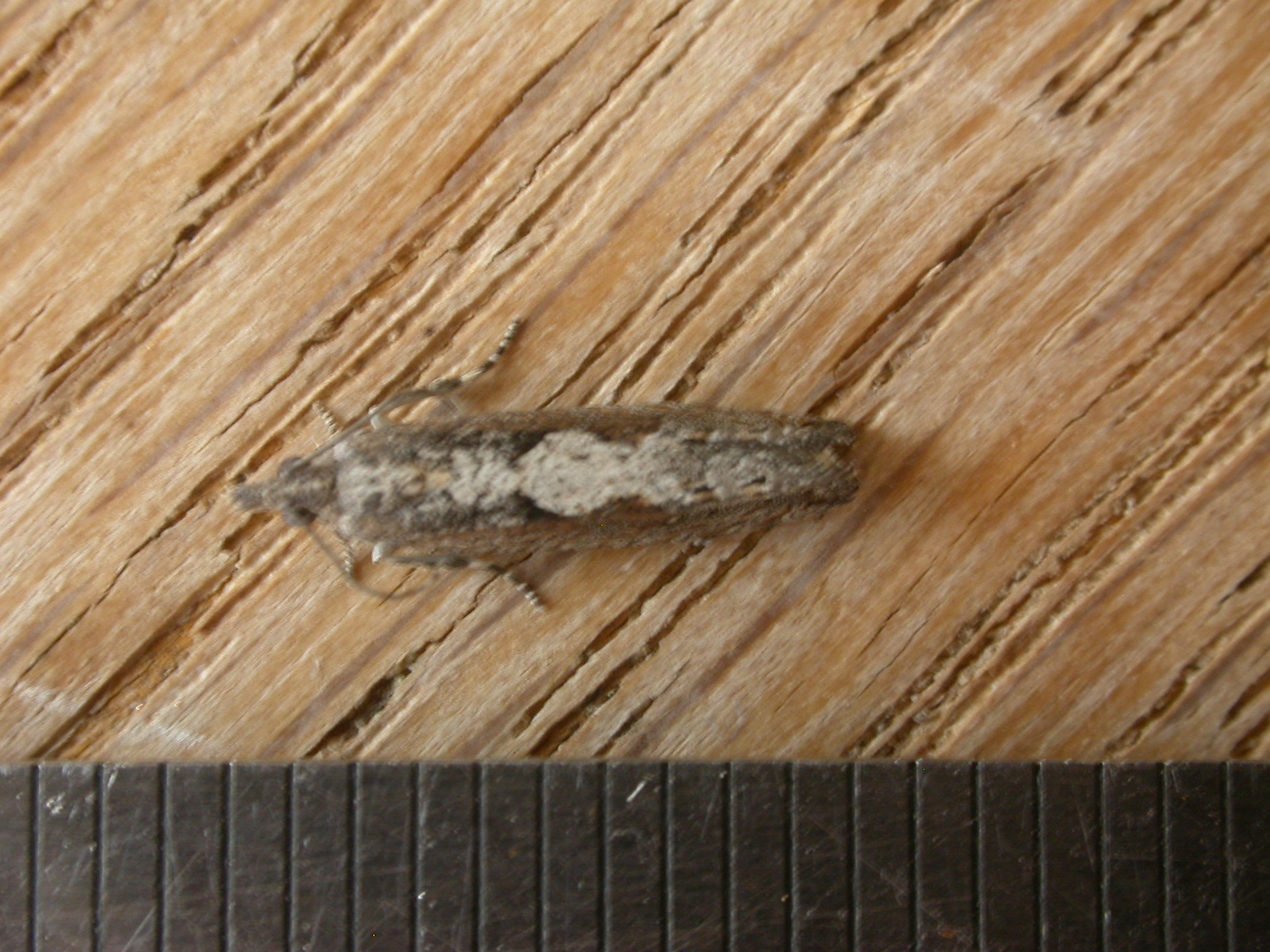

Scientific classification
- Kingdom: Animalia
- Phylum: Arthropoda
- Class: Insecta
- Order: Lepidoptera
- Family: Tortricidae
- Genus: Stictea
- Species: S. macropetana

Binomial name
- Stictea macropetana (Meyrick, 1881)

Synonyms
- Strepsiceros macropetana Meyrick, 1881; Strepsicrates macropetana (Meyrick, 1881); Spilonota macropetana (Meyrick, 1881)

= Stictea macropetana =

Species of moth

Stictea macropetana, the eucalyptus leafroller, is a moth of the family Tortricidae. It is native to Australia, but is an introduced species in New Zealand, where it was first recorded in 1921. It was first described by Edward Meyrick in 1881.

The wingspan is 13–19 mm.

The larvae feed on the leaves, buds and developing flowers of young eucalypts, including Eucalyptus microcorys, Eucalyptus nitens, Eucalyptus fastigata, Eucalyptus saligna, Eucalyptus cladocalyx, Eucalyptus baxteri, Eucalyptus muelleriana, Eucalyptus obliqua, Eucalyptus globoidea, and Eucalyptus regnans.
