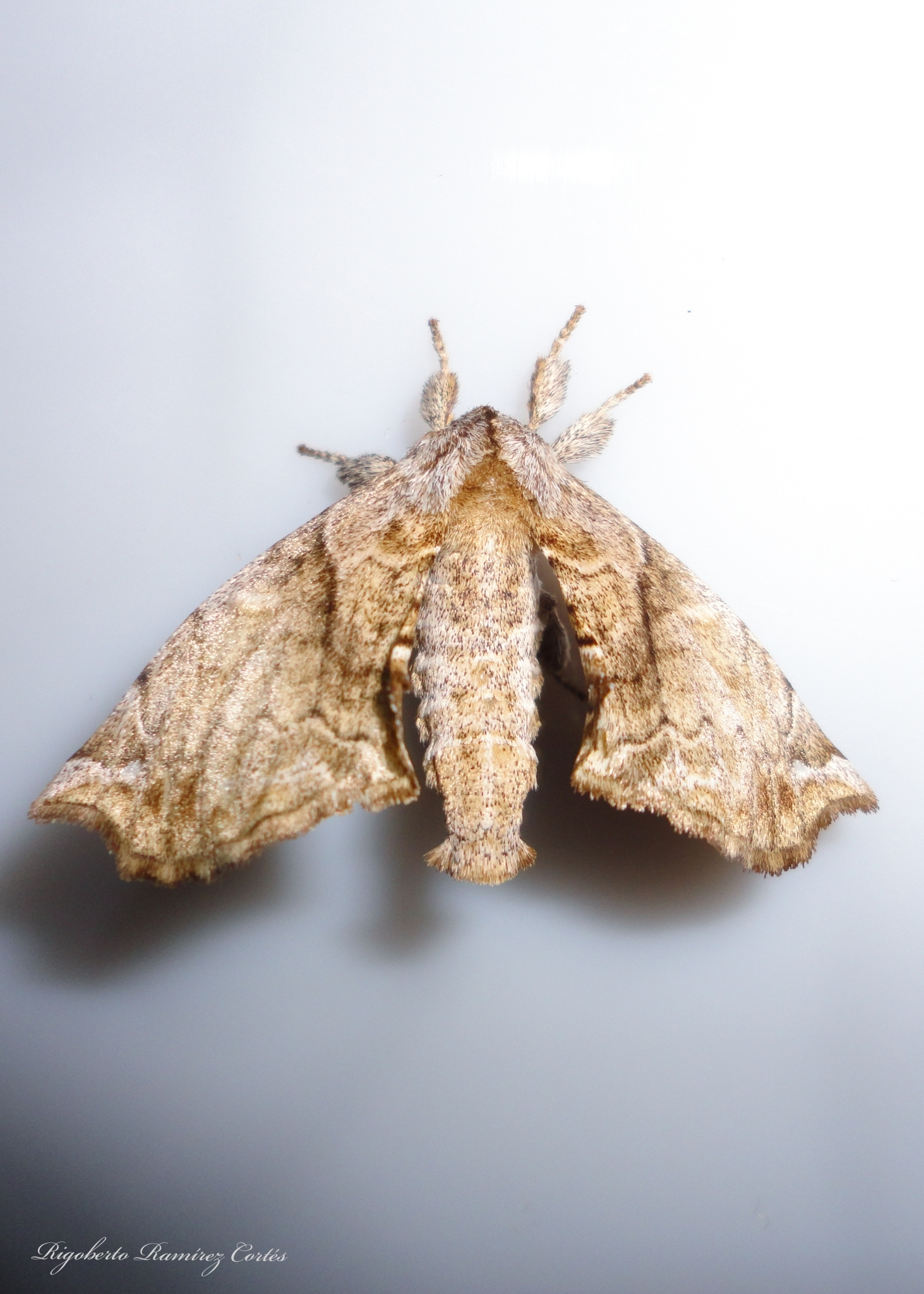
- In Oaxaca, Mexico

Scientific classification
- Kingdom: Animalia
- Phylum: Arthropoda
- Class: Insecta
- Order: Lepidoptera
- Family: Apatelodidae
- Genus: Apatelodes
- Species: A. heptaloba

Binomial name
- Apatelodes heptaloba H. Druce, 1887

= Apatelodes heptaloba =

Species of moth

Apatelodes heptaloba is a moth in the family Apatelodidae first described by Herbert Druce in 1887. It is found in Guatemala.
