= Apatelodes adrastia =

Scientific classification
- Kingdom: Animalia
- Phylum: Arthropoda
- Class: Insecta
- Order: Lepidoptera
- Family: Apatelodidae
- Genus: Apatelodes
- Species: A. adrastia

Binomial name
- Apatelodes adrastia H. Druce, 1887

Synonyms
- Apatelodes diffidens Edwards; Apatelodes costaricensis Draudt, 1929

Species of moth

Apatelodes adrastia is a moth in the family Apatelodidae first described by Herbert Druce in 1887. It is found in Mexico, Costa Rica and Panama.
