= Apatelodes mehida =

Scientific classification
- Kingdom: Animalia
- Phylum: Arthropoda
- Class: Insecta
- Order: Lepidoptera
- Family: Apatelodidae
- Genus: Apatelodes
- Species: A. mehida

Binomial name
- Apatelodes mehida H. Druce, 1904

Species of moth

Apatelodes mehida is a moth in the family Apatelodidae first described by Herbert Druce in 1904. It is found in south-eastern Peru.

The forewings are greyish brown with darker brown veins and a large brown spot, edged with white, on the outer side close to the apex. There is a dark brown elongated spot on the inner margin near the base and a straight brown line crosses the wing from the apex to the anal angle, between it and the base are two narrow curved lines extending from the costal to the inner margin. The hindwings are reddish brown, crossed about the middle from the costal to the inner margin by a pale greyish-brown waved band, which is darkest on the inner margin.
