= Apatelodes batima =

Scientific classification
- Kingdom: Animalia
- Phylum: Arthropoda
- Class: Insecta
- Order: Lepidoptera
- Family: Apatelodidae
- Genus: Apatelodes
- Species: A. batima

Binomial name
- Apatelodes batima Dyar, 1912

Synonyms
- Hygrochroa batima Dyar, 1912

Species of moth

Apatelodes batima is a moth in the family Apatelodidae. It is found in Mexico (Guerrero).
