= Apatelodes merlona =

Scientific classification
- Kingdom: Animalia
- Phylum: Arthropoda
- Class: Insecta
- Order: Lepidoptera
- Family: Apatelodidae
- Genus: Apatelodes
- Species: A. merlona

Binomial name
- Apatelodes merlona Schaus, 1939

Synonyms
- Hygrochroa merlona

Species of moth

Apatelodes merlona is a moth in the family Apatelodidae. It is found in Guatemala.
