= Apatelodes sublunulata =

Scientific classification
- Kingdom: Animalia
- Phylum: Arthropoda
- Class: Insecta
- Order: Lepidoptera
- Family: Apatelodidae
- Genus: Apatelodes
- Species: A. sublunulata

Binomial name
- Apatelodes sublunulata Schaus, 1920

Species of moth

Apatelodes sublunulata is a moth in the family Apatelodidae. It is found in Mexico.
