= Apatelodes diana =

Scientific classification
- Kingdom: Animalia
- Phylum: Arthropoda
- Class: Insecta
- Order: Lepidoptera
- Family: Apatelodidae
- Genus: Apatelodes
- Species: A. diana

Binomial name
- Apatelodes diana Dognin, 1916

Species of moth

Apatelodes diana is a moth in the family Apatelodidae. It is found in Colombia.
