= Apatelodes jessica =

Scientific classification
- Kingdom: Animalia
- Phylum: Arthropoda
- Class: Insecta
- Order: Lepidoptera
- Family: Apatelodidae
- Genus: Apatelodes
- Species: A. jessica

Binomial name
- Apatelodes jessica Dyar, 1926

Synonyms
- Apatelodes Jessica f. floramia Dyar, 1926; Apatelodes Jessica f. maudamia Dyar, 1926

Species of moth

Apatelodes jessica is a moth in the family Apatelodidae. It is found in Mexico.
