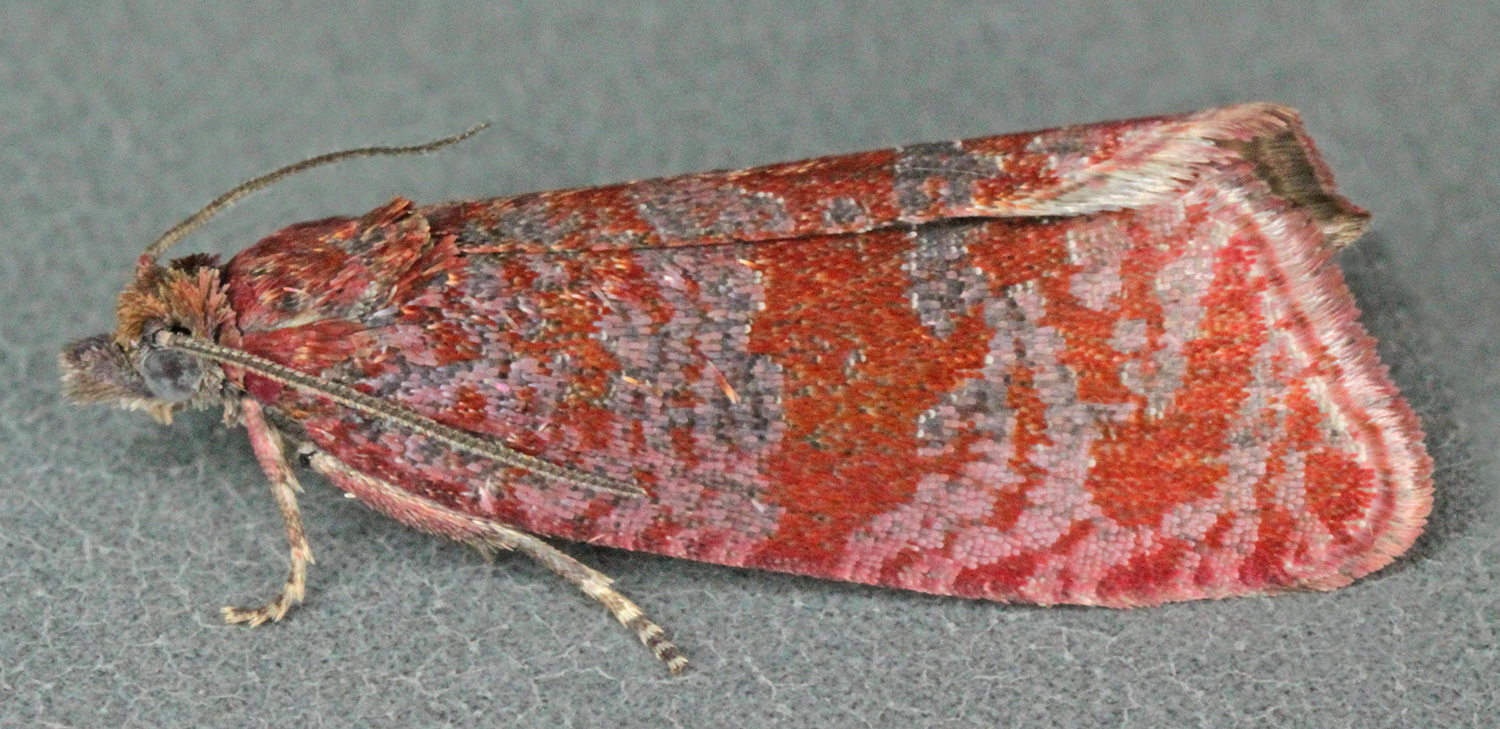
- Stictea mygindiana

Scientific classification
- Domain: Eukaryota
- Kingdom: Animalia
- Phylum: Arthropoda
- Class: Insecta
- Order: Lepidoptera
- Family: Tortricidae
- Subfamily: Olethreutinae
- Tribe: Olethreutini
- Genus: Stictea; Guenée, 1845

= Stictea =

Genus of tortrix moths

Stictea is a genus of moths belonging to the subfamily Olethreutinae of the family Tortricidae.

Delimitation of this genus versus Strepsicrates is not fully resolved, and some species now listed here were formerly placed there.

== Species ==
- Stictea coriariae (Oku, 1974)
- Stictea cryptosema (Diakonoff, 1983)
- Stictea dilacerata (Meyrick, 1929)
- Stictea discobola (Diakonoff, 1968)
- Stictea dyselia (Turner, 1946)
- Stictea ejectana (Walker, 1863) (= S. holotephras)
- Stictea fenestrata (Walsingham, 1907)
- Stictea glaucothoe (Meyrick, 1927)
- Stictea infensa (Meyrick, 1911)
- Stictea inobtrusa (Diakonoff, 1968)
- Stictea limnephilana (Meyrick, 1881)
- Stictea macropetana (Meyrick, 1881)
- Stictea mygindiana ([Denis & Schiffermuller], 1775)
- Stictea sphenophora (Turner, 1946)

== See also ==
- List of Tortricidae genera
