= Apatelodes dianita =

Scientific classification
- Kingdom: Animalia
- Phylum: Arthropoda
- Class: Insecta
- Order: Lepidoptera
- Family: Apatelodidae
- Genus: Apatelodes
- Species: A. dianita

Binomial name
- Apatelodes dianita Dognin, 1921

Species of moth

Apatelodes dianita is a moth in the family Apatelodidae. It is found in Bolivia.
