= Strepsicrates melanotreta =

Scientific classification
- Kingdom: Animalia
- Phylum: Arthropoda
- Class: Insecta
- Order: Lepidoptera
- Family: Tortricidae
- Genus: Strepsicrates
- Species: S. melanotreta

Binomial name
- Strepsicrates melanotreta (Meyrick, 1910)

Synonyms
- Spilonota melanotreta Meyrick, 1910

Species of moth endemic to New Zealand

Strepsicrates melanotreta is a species of moth in the family Tortricidae first described by Edward Meyrick in 1905. This species is endemic to New Zealand.
