= Seed production and gene diversity =

Major classical genetics consideration in seeds and forest crops

Genetic diversity is often a major consideration in e g forest crops.

== Group coancestry of a population ==
Consider the gene pool of a seed orchard crop or other source of seeds with parents. The gene pool is large as there are many seeds in a seed crop, so there is no genetic drift. The probability that the first gene originates from genotype i in the seed orchard is p_{i}, and the probability that the second originates from genotype j is p_{j}. The probability that these two genes originate from the orchard genotypes i and j are identical by descent (IBD) is θ_{ij}. This is the Malecot's method of coancestry (or "coefficient of kinship"; "coefficient of relationship" is a similar measure which can be computed) between genotype i and j. The probability that any pair of genes is IBD, Θ, can be found by adding over all possible pairs of genes from N parents. The formula for the group coancestry (from which gene diversity can be obtained) of seed orchard crops is:

Θ=$\sum_{i=1}^N \sum_{j=1}^N$ p_{i}p_{j}θ_{ij}.

The group coancestry of a seed orchard crop can be divided in two terms, one for self-coancestry and one for cross-coancestry:

Θ=$\sum_{i=1}^N$ p_{i}^{2}(1+F_{i})/2 + $\sum_{i=1}^N$ $\sum_{j=1}^N$ p_{i}p_{j}θ_{ij}, the last summation excluding j=i.

Let’s consider a simple case. If the seed orchard genotypes are unrelated the second term is zero, if there is no inbreeding, the first term becomes simple. For no relatedness and no inbreeding, status number (N_{S}, effective number of parents) becomes:

N_{S} = 1/$\sum_{i=1}^N$ p_{i}^{2}

Similar but less developed expressions has been used many times before, it has similarities to the concept of effective population size as defined by A. Robertson in 1961.
