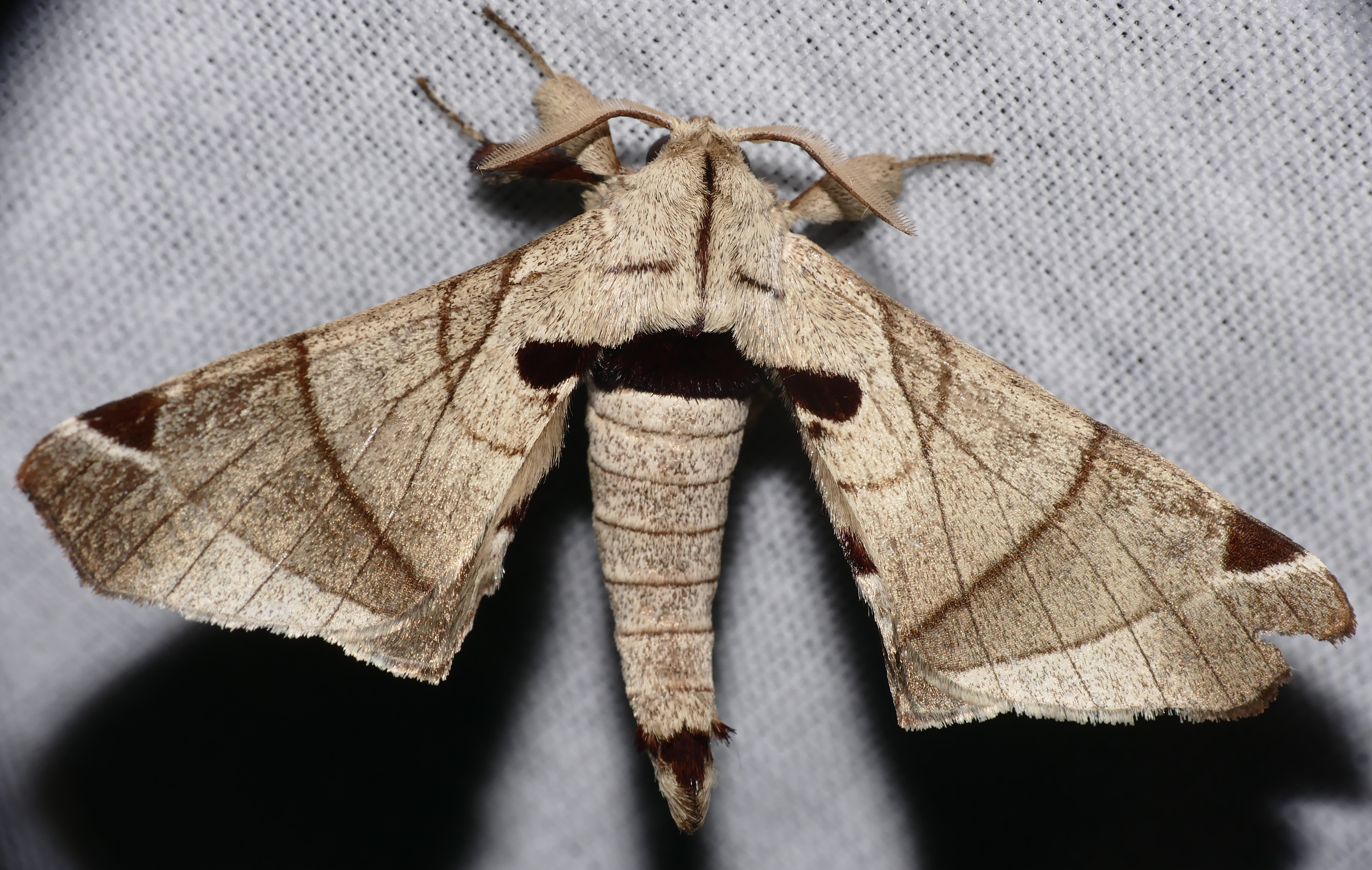

Scientific classification
- Kingdom: Animalia
- Phylum: Arthropoda
- Clade: Pancrustacea
- Class: Insecta
- Order: Lepidoptera
- Family: Apatelodidae
- Genus: Apatelodes; Packard, 1864

Synonyms
- Astasia Harris, 1841

= Apatelodes =

Genus of moths

Apatelodes is a genus of moths of the family Apatelodidae erected by Alpheus Spring Packard in 1864.

== Species ==
The following species are recognised in the genus Apatelodes:

- Apatelodes adrastia Druce, 1887
- Apatelodes amaryllis Dyar, 1907
- Apatelodes auduboni Wagner & Knudson, 2014
- Apatelodes batima Dyar, 1912
- Apatelodes bruckneri Draudt, 1929
- Apatelodes cerrita Draudt, 1929
- Apatelodes costaricensis Draudt, 1929
- Apatelodes diana Dognin, 1916
- Apatelodes dianita Dognin, 1921
- Apatelodes floramia Dyar, 1926
- Apatelodes gaveta (Dognin, 1894)
- Apatelodes gladys Dyar, 1918
- Apatelodes heptaloba Druce, 1887
- Apatelodes horina Schaus, 1920
- Apatelodes jessica Dyar, 1926
- Apatelodes lacetania Druce, 1898
- Apatelodes lescamia Dyar, 1912
- Apatelodes mehida Druce, 1904
- Apatelodes merlona Schaus, 1939
- Apatelodes milma Dyar, 1912
- Apatelodes palma Druce, 1900
- Apatelodes princeps Dognin, 1911
- Apatelodes pudefacta Dyar, 1904
- Apatelodes schusteri Herbin & Monzon, 2015
- Apatelodes sublunulata Schaus, 1920
- Apatelodes torrefacta Smith, 1797
- Apatelodes turrialba Schaus, 1910
- Apatelodes verena Druce, 1898
