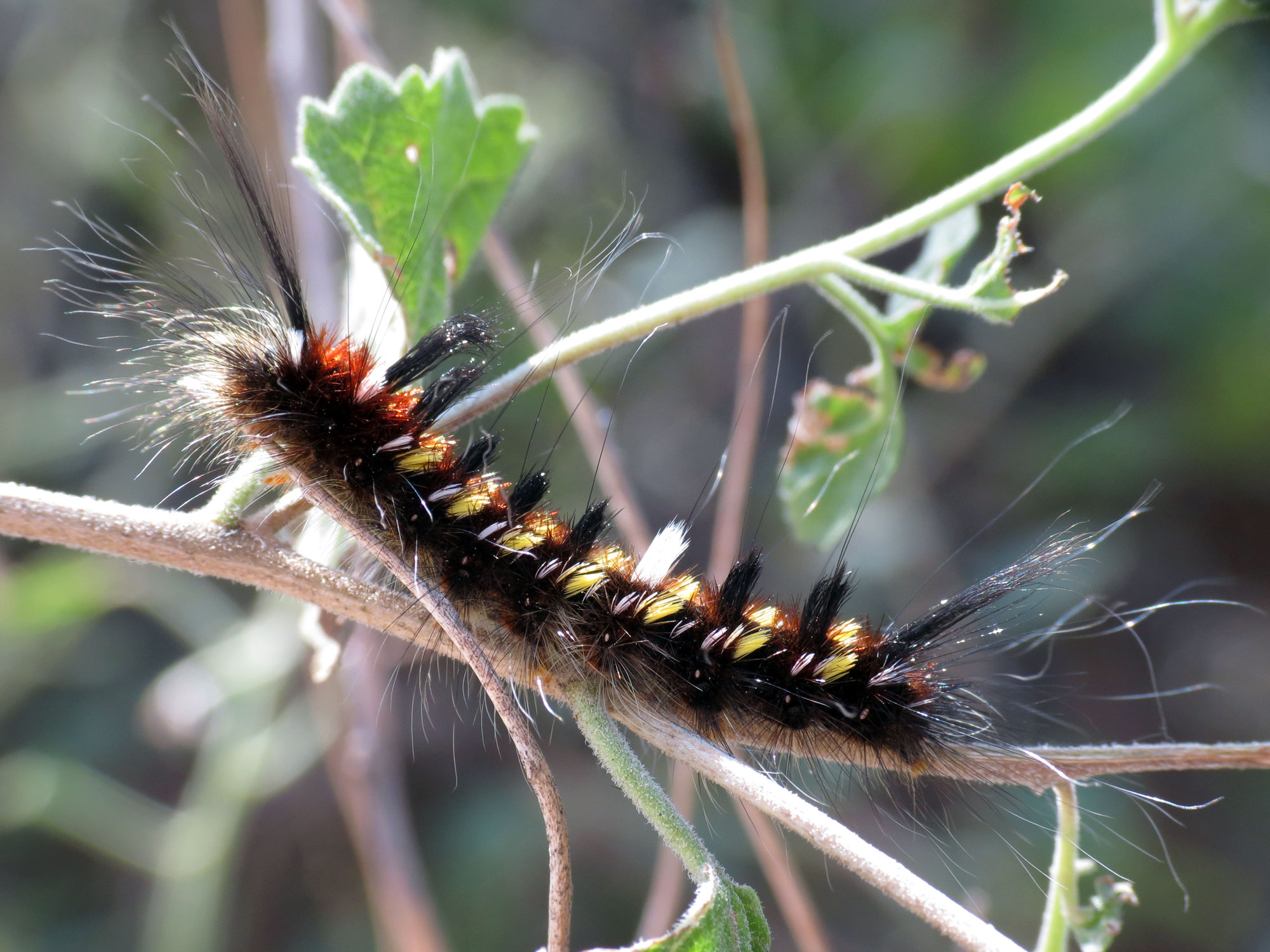

Scientific classification
- Kingdom: Animalia
- Phylum: Arthropoda
- Clade: Pancrustacea
- Class: Insecta
- Order: Lepidoptera
- Family: Apatelodidae
- Genus: Apatelodes
- Species: A. pudefacta

Binomial name
- Apatelodes pudefacta Dyar, 1904

Synonyms
- Apatelodes uvada Barnes, 1904

= Apatelodes pudefacta =

Species of moth

Apatelodes pudefacta, the pudefacted apatelodes moth, is a moth in the family Apatelodidae first described by Harrison Gray Dyar Jr. in 1904. It is found in the US state of Arizona and Mexico.

The length of the forewings is 17–18 mm.

The larvae feed on Baccharis bigelovii. Pupation takes place in a cell in the soil.
