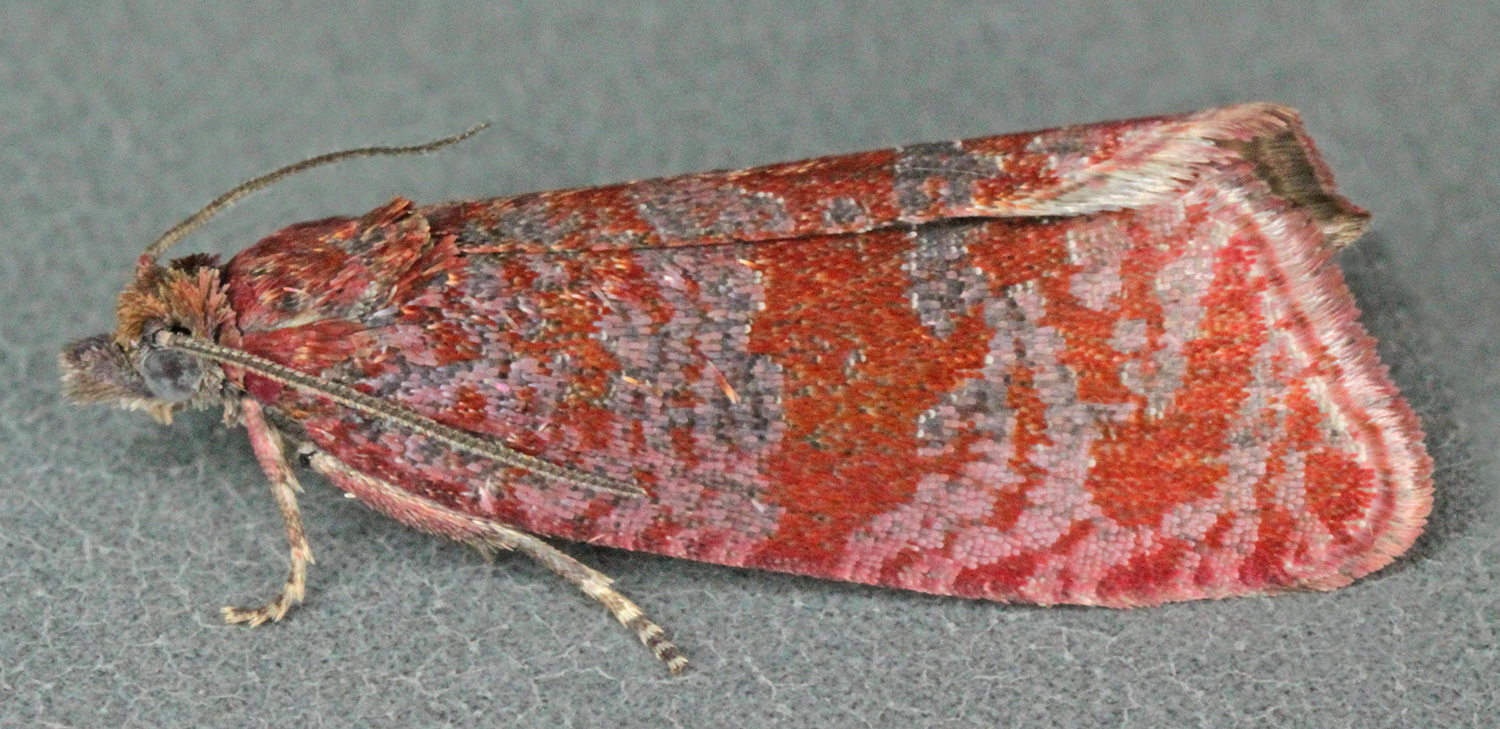

Scientific classification
- Kingdom: Animalia
- Phylum: Arthropoda
- Class: Insecta
- Order: Lepidoptera
- Family: Tortricidae
- Genus: Stictea
- Species: S. mygindiana

Binomial name
- Stictea mygindiana (Denis & Schiffermüller, 1775)

= Stictea mygindiana =

Species of moth

Stictea mygindiana is a moth belonging to the family Tortricidae. The species was first described by Michael Denis and Ignaz Schiffermüller in 1775.

It is native to Europe.

The wingspan is 15-20mm. The ground colour of the forewings is warm brownish-red, with silvery cross stripes and a brown-red mesh pattern. The hindwings are brownish-white.

The larvae feed on Vaccinium vitis-idaea, Arctostaphylos uva-ursi and Myrica gale. The species flies in May–June on moors and in coniferous forests where these plants grow.
