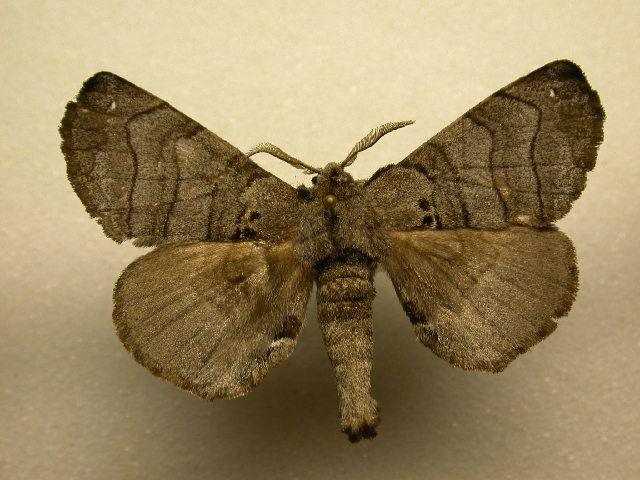

Scientific classification
- Kingdom: Animalia
- Phylum: Arthropoda
- Class: Insecta
- Order: Lepidoptera
- Family: Apatelodidae
- Genus: Apatelodes
- Species: A. turrialba

Binomial name
- Apatelodes turrialba Schaus, 1910

= Apatelodes turrialba =

Species of moth

Apatelodes turrialba is a moth in the family Apatelodidae. It is found in Costa Rica.
