= Apatelodes amaryllis =

Scientific classification
- Kingdom: Animalia
- Phylum: Arthropoda
- Class: Insecta
- Order: Lepidoptera
- Family: Apatelodidae
- Genus: Apatelodes
- Species: A. amaryllis

Binomial name
- Apatelodes amaryllis Dyar, 1907

Species of moth

Apatelodes amaryllis is a moth in the family Apatelodidae. It is found in Mexico (Distrito Federal).
