= Strepsicrates semicanella =

Scientific classification
- Kingdom: Animalia
- Phylum: Arthropoda
- Class: Insecta
- Order: Lepidoptera
- Family: Tortricidae
- Genus: Strepsicrates
- Species: S. semicanella

Binomial name
- Strepsicrates semicanella (Walker, 1866)

Synonyms
- Monilia semicanella Walker, 1866; Spilonota euploca Turner, 1946; Strepsiceros lasiophora Lower, 1908

Species of moth

Strepsicrates semicanella is a species of moth of the family Tortricidae first described by Francis Walker in 1866. It is found in south-east Asia (including Seram Island) and in New Caledonia, Australia (where it has been recorded from Queensland, Western Australia, the Northern Territory and New South Wales) and Japan. The habitat consists of alluvial forests.
