= Apatelodes gaveta =

Scientific classification
- Kingdom: Animalia
- Phylum: Arthropoda
- Class: Insecta
- Order: Lepidoptera
- Family: Apatelodidae
- Genus: Apatelodes
- Species: A. gaveta

Binomial name
- Apatelodes gaveta Dognin, 1894

Synonyms
- Hygrochroa gaveta

Species of moth

Apatelodes gaveta is a moth in the family Apatelodidae.
