= Strepsicrates penechra =

Scientific classification
- Domain: Eukaryota
- Kingdom: Animalia
- Phylum: Arthropoda
- Class: Insecta
- Order: Lepidoptera
- Family: Tortricidae
- Genus: Strepsicrates
- Species: S. penechra

Binomial name
- Strepsicrates penechra (Diakonoff, 1989)

Synonyms
- Spilonota penechra Diakonoff, 1989

Species of moth

Strepsicrates penechra is a moth of the family Tortricidae.

It is known from Madagascar and La Réunion.

The wingspan of this species is 14 mm.
