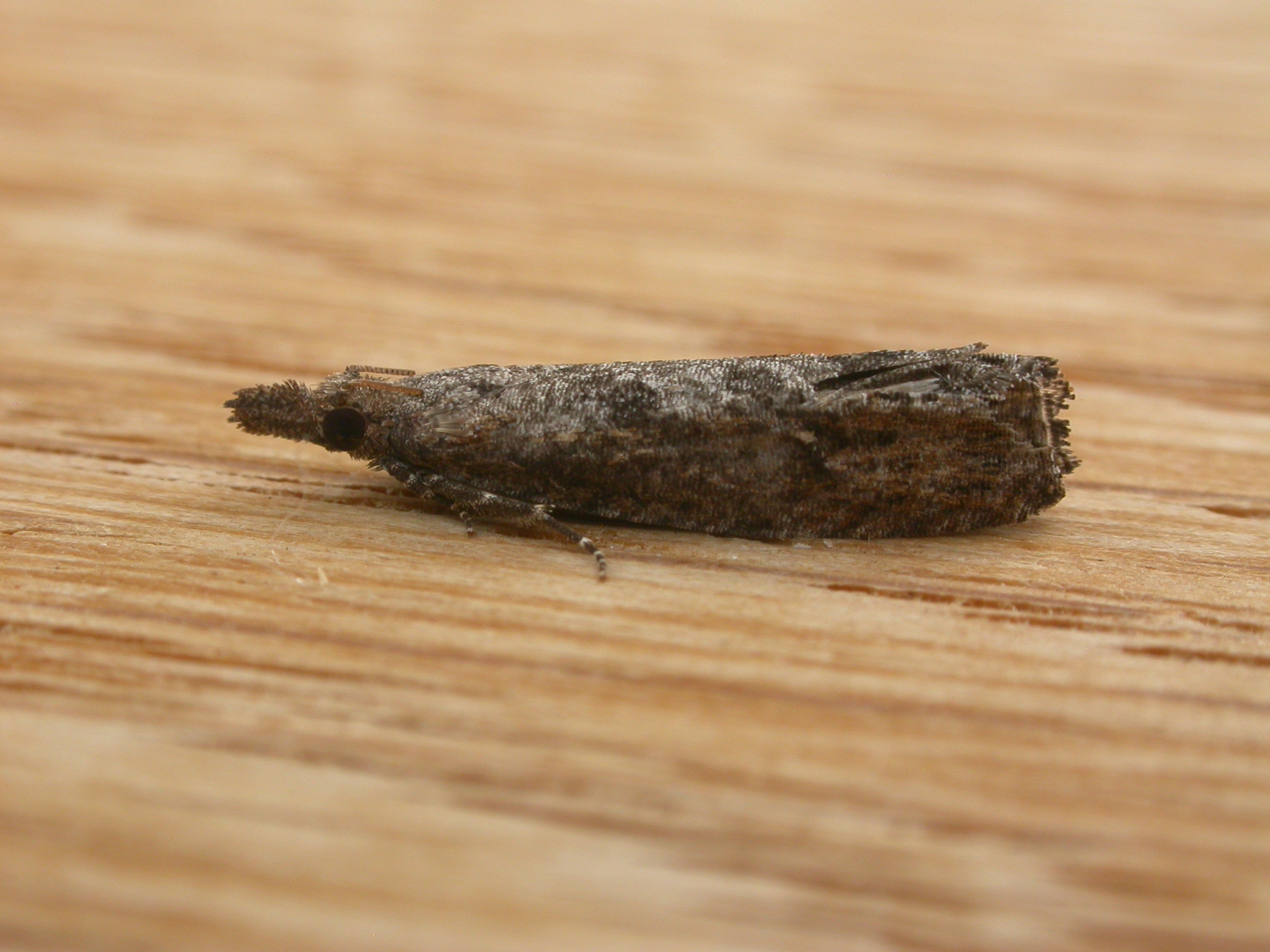

Scientific classification
- Kingdom: Animalia
- Phylum: Arthropoda
- Class: Insecta
- Order: Lepidoptera
- Family: Tortricidae
- Genus: Stictea
- Species: S. infensa

Binomial name
- Stictea infensa (Meyrick, 1911)

Synonyms
- Spilonota infensa Meyrick, 1911; Strepsicrates infensa

= Stictea infensa =

Species of moth

Stictea infensa is a moth of the family Tortricidae. It is known from Australia, including Queensland and New South Wales. It is also found in New Zealand.

The wingspan is about 19 mm.

The larvae feed on Eucalyptus species.
