= Tree breeding =

Aspect of forestry/silviculture

Tree breeding is the application of genetic, reproductive biology and economics principles to the genetic improvement and management of forest trees. In contrast to the selective breeding of livestock, arable crops, and horticultural flowers over the last few centuries, the breeding of trees, with the exception of fruit trees, is a relatively recent occurrence.

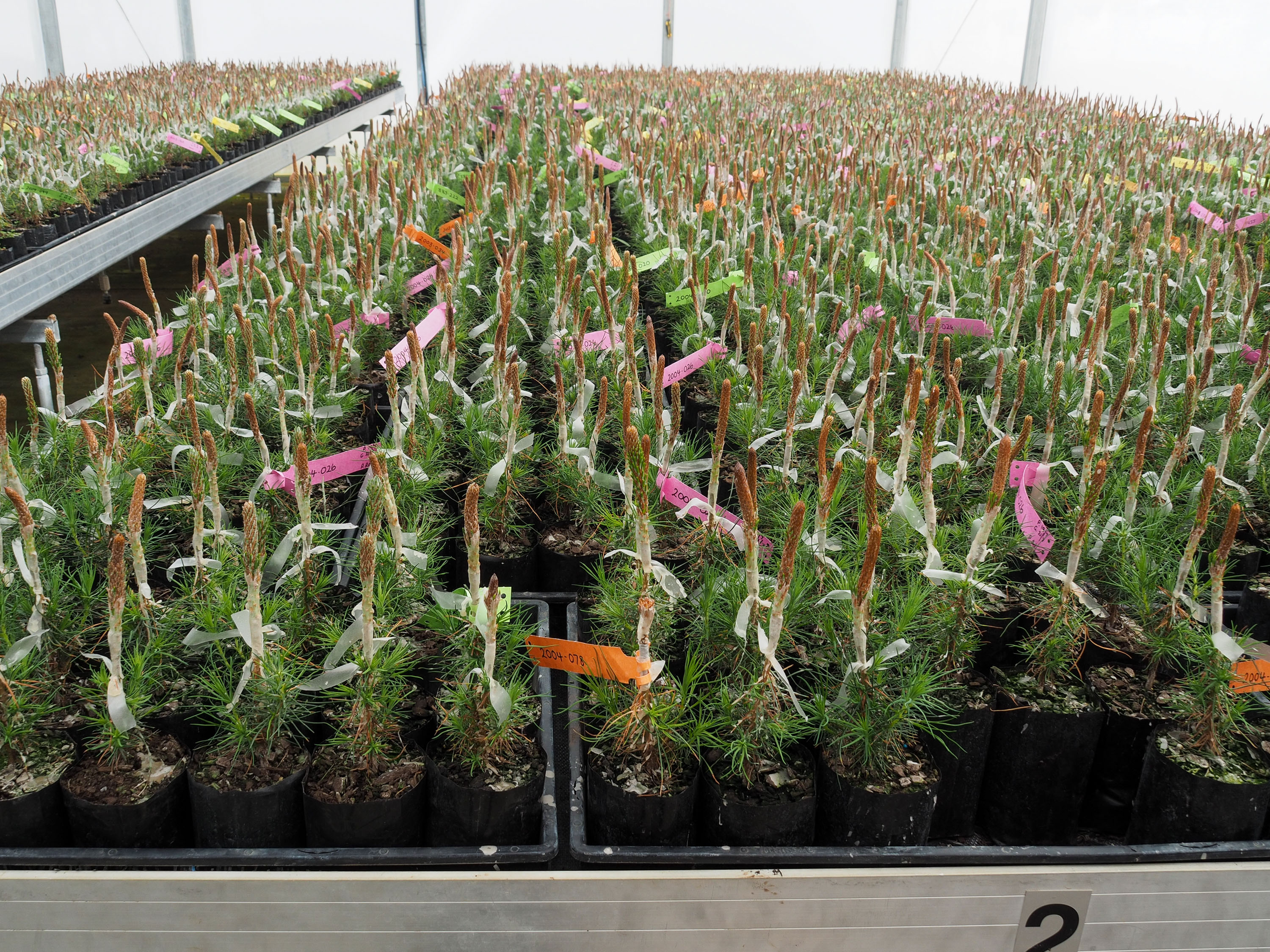
Pinus radiata grafts in preparation for the establishment of a seed orchard in New Zealand

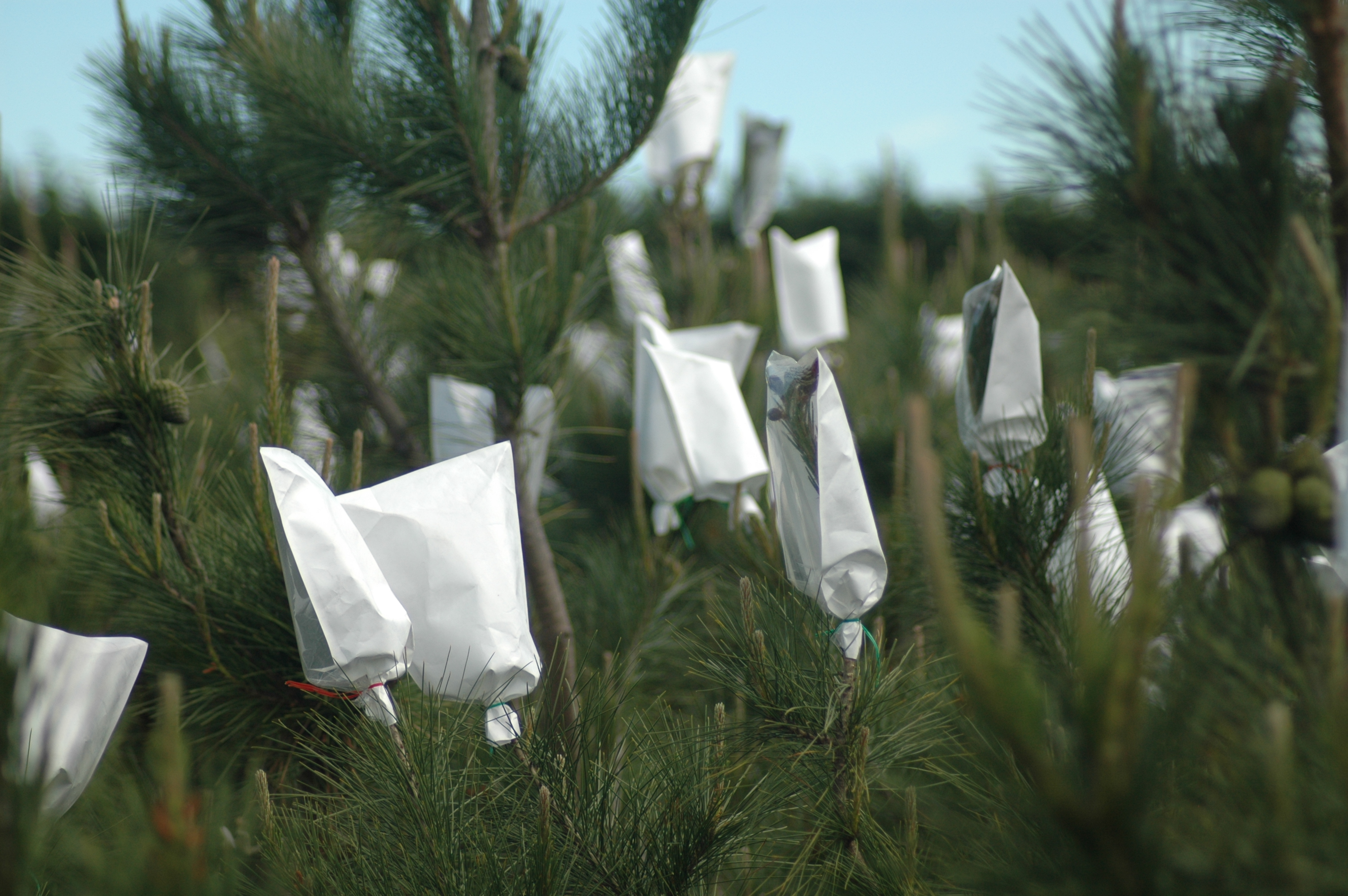
Isolation bags for controlled pollination in a Pinus radiata seed orchard.

A typical forest tree breeding program starts with selection of superior phenotypes (plus trees) in a natural or planted forest, often based on growth rate, tree form and site adaptation traits. This application of mass selection improves the mean performance of the forest. Offspring is obtained from selected trees and grown in test plantations that act as genetic trials. Based on such tests the best genotypes among the parents can be selected. Selected trees are typically propagated either by seeds or by grafting, and seed orchards are established when the preferred output is improved seed. Alternatively, the best genotypes can be directly propagated by cuttings or in-vitro methods and used directly in clonal plantations. The first system is frequently used for pines and other conifers, while the second is typical in some broadleaves (poplars, eucalypts and others). The objectives of a tree breeding program range from yield improvement and adaptation to particular conditions, to pest- and disease-resistance, wood properties, etc. Currently, tree breeding is starting to take advantage of the fast development in plant genetics and genomics.

== Optimisation ==
Tree breeders try to improve their operation's efficiency by optimising tree breeding. Scientists develop tools aimed at improving the efficiency of tree breeding programmes. Optimising can mean adapting strategies and methods to certain species, groups of populations, structures of genetic variation and modes of inheritance of the important traits to obtain the highest benefit per unit of time. Optimising is usually carried out at the following levels:

- breeding strategy (appropriate intensity of breeding, breeding population structure and size, plan for maintenance of genetic diversity),
- breeding methods (mating type, testing and selection methods, testing population size and time) and
- deployment methods of the genetically improved material (seed orchards and clonal forestry: genetic contribution, size).

Computer simulations, based on defined algorithms, are frequently used: either incorporating random variations (stochastic) or not (deterministic).

Selection strategies have been compared for annual progress in long-term breeding at a given annual cost considering genetic gain, gene diversity, cost components, and time components. For Norway spruce it seems favourable to clone full sib families and then select based on clonal performance while for Scots pine a two-stage strategy seems best, first phenotypic pre-selection and then progeny-testing the selections.

== Tree improvement ==
A genetically variable population and a method of selecting genetically superior individuals provide the basis for tree improvement by breeding. In essence, a tree improvement program sets out to isolate and evaluate the genetic component of variation in one or more characters of interest. In the simplest procedure, cycles of selection reduce the available population in a particular direction to enhance desirable traits, then breeding from selections to expand the population with improved characteristics. Breeding strategies vary with species and objectives, but all use mating designs to generate information and new material. Choice of a suitable breeding strategy and mating design is a key decision in any breeding program. Kiss (1986) used a 2-level design in British Columbia to study variation within and between separate populations of white spruce, both within British Columbia and from eastern North America.

The breeding program for white spruce initiated in 1986 by the Canadian Forestry Service in the Maritimes employed 2 kinds of mating: polycross, to test clones for general combining ability; and pair-mating, to generate material for second generation selections (Fowler et al. 1988).

Newton's (2003) systematic review of yield responses of white spruce and 3 other North American conifers to forest tree improvement practices indicated that correct provenance-progeny selection could yield juvenile height growth gains of about 12% at 20 years for white spruce, and corresponding merchantable productivity (mean annual merchantable volume increment) gains of 26% at 50 years for plantations established at nominal initial densities on medium-to-good quality sites. Also, preliminary estimates derived from individual case studies indicated that first generational selection strategies for white spruce could increase merchantable productivity by approximately 20% at 45 years.

== See also ==
- Genetically modified tree
- Selection

== Selected bibliography ==
- White, T.L., Adams, W.T. and Neale, D.B. 2007. Forest Genetics, CABI. ISBN 978-0-85199-348-5
- 2007 Gösta Eriksson, Inger Ekberg and David Clapham. An Introduction to Forest Genetics. ISBN 91-576-7190-7
- 1984. Applied Forest Tree Improvement. Bruce Zobel, John Talbert, North Carolina State University, John Wiley and Sons, Inc, ISBN 0-471-09682-2
