= Stictea ejectana =

Guava bud moth

Scientific classification
- Kingdom: Animalia
- Phylum: Arthropoda
- Clade: Pancrustacea
- Class: Insecta
- Order: Lepidoptera
- Family: Tortricidae
- Genus: Stictea
- Species: S. ejectana

Binomial name
- Stictea ejectana Walker, 1863

Synonyms
- Strepsicrates ejectana; Eucosma eumarodes Meyrick, 1924; Spilonota holotephras Meyrick, 1924; Strepsicrates igniferana McQuillan, 1992; Sciaphila infimana Walker, 1864; Conchylis ligniferana Walker, 1863; Spilonota mesosticha Turner, 1946; Spilonota metabola Turner, 1946; Sciaphila saxana Walker, 1863; Sciaphila servilisana Walker, 1863; Spilonota sphenophora Turner, 1946; Spilonota subpallida Turner, 1946; Spilonota zophotypa Turner, 1946

Species of moth

Stictea ejectana, the guava bud moth, is a moth of the family Tortricidae. It was described by Francis Walker in 1863. It is found on Fiji, Samoa, the Marquesas Archipelago, Tahiti, Rapa Iti, the southern Mariana Islands, the Philippines and in New Caledonia, New Zealand and Australia (New South Wales, Tasmania and Western Australia).

The wingspan is about 20 mm. Adults are brown with a complex pattern on the forewings.

The larvae feed on Thryptomene calycina, Psidium guajava, Psidium littorale, Syzygium jambos, Eugenia uniflora, Calluna vulgaris, and Metrosideros collina.

Adults are attracted to light and have been collected via a mercury vapour light trap.
