= Telangana Ku Haritha Hāram =

Telangana government tree-planting programme

Haritha Haram
- Type of project: Green cover
- Location: Telangana, India
- Founder: Government of Telangana
- Chief Minister: K. Chandrashekar Rao
- Key people: Dr. Priyankaa Varghese, IFS (OSD to CM & Project Director)
- Established: 3 July 2015
- Budget: ₹550crores
- Status: Active
- Website: http://harithaharam.telangana.gov.in/

Telangana Ku Haritha Hāram is the afforestation program undertaken by the Telangana government. Haritaharam 2015 was officially inaugurated by Telangana State Chief Minister Kalvakuntla Chandrasekhar Rao on 3 July 2015 at Chilukur Balaji Temple. The Telangana Government has designed this program with the objective of planting trees and greening the whole of Telangana (33% of Telangana land area). 46 crore saplings were planted in 2016 alone.

== History ==
The program was launched by the Chief Minister of Telangana, Mr K. Chandrashekar Rao on 3 July 2015. It is one of the Telangana Flagship programmes to rejuvenate degraded forests, protecting these forests from threats such as smuggling, encroachment, fire and grazing. It adopted intensive soil and moisture conservation measures based on a watershed approach.

In the areas outside the existing forest, massive planting activities were to be taken up in areas such as; road-side avenues, river, and canal banks, barren hills and foreshore areas, institutional premises, religious places, housing colonies, community lands, municipalities and industrial parks. The National Forest Policy of India envisages a minimum of 33% of the total geographical area under forest cover to maintain environmental stability and ecological balance

== Planning and implementation ==
Specific duties and responsibilities are assigned to different committees to ensure the implementation of the program in a well-designed way. These committees do regular field inspections and monitor the ongoing plantation and nursery works. The committees are the State-Level Steering Committee and the District-Level Monitoring and Coordination Committee.

At the village level, Haritha Rakshana Committees were formed to monitor the program under the Chairmanship of Gram Sarpanch.

The seedlings are monitored through geo-tagging. The Forest Department posts survival percentage details on the Department.

== Planting models ==
The program uses multiple planting models:

- Avenue Plantation – Plants will be planted along National Highway roads, State Highway roads, and streets of villages and towns. Species include silver oak, kanuga, yapaa(neem), raavi, marri, neredu, rain tree, Gulmohar, and spathodia.
- Block Plantation – Planting will be attempted in wastelands, common lands, and panchayat lands. These plantations will be raised in the vicinity of villages to meet the fuel, fodder, and MFP needs. Species include albizia, acacia, sisso, neredu, sundra, chinduga, river tamarind (Leucaena leucocephala) and gliricidia. Planting will be performed by the concerned departments. After planting the plantations will be handed over to the gram panchayat for maintenance.
- Institutional Plantation – Planting will be done at schools, colleges, government institutions, hospitals, graveyards, and private institutions and industries. Species include neem, kanuga, neredu, maredu, rela, gulmohar, raintree, badam and peltophorum. Planting will be performed by the concerned departments. Protection and watering will be the responsibility of the best institute.
- Tank Fore Shore Plantation – Planting will be at Tank Fore Shores. Species include nalla thumma, kanuga, neredu, and arjuna. Planting will be taken up by the departments in charge of the mandal. After planting the plantations will be handed over to the gram panchayat for maintenance.
- Homestead Plantation – Planting will be around the houses and colonies to meet household needs. Species include Neredu, Seethaphal, Usiri, Pappaya, Guava, Neem, Maredu, Soapnut, Badam, Munaga, and medicinal plants. Planting and maintenance will be performed by the residents.
- Agro-Forestry Plantation – Planting will be on farmland. Species include teak, red sanders, tamarind, munaga, bombax, eucalyptus, bamboo, and subabool. Farmers will do the planting and maintenance.
- Barren hill – Planting will be on barren hillocks. Species include hardy plants such as sissoo, acacia, nemali nara and kanuga. Planting will be by the concerned departments. Maintenance will be performed by gram panchayats.

== Achievements of the Forest Department ==
In this programme, it is proposed to plant and rejuvenate 230 crore seedlings as follows:

- Outside Forests areas – 130 crores (including 10.00 Crs. in HMDA and GHMC areas)
- 100 crores within Forest areas (20.00 Crs through plantations and 80.00) Crs through rejuvenation.

Block plantations are taken up in the forest areas where old eucalyptus plantations are harvested, in the retrieved encroached areas, and in the open areas. These block plantations are taken up in a semi-mechanical method (SMM) and labour intensive method (LI). Total achievements as of 2016-17 are 18920 Ha.

Planting achievements:

- 2015-16: 15.86 crores plants
- 2016-17: 31.67 crores plants
- 2017-18: 15.10 crores plants

== Urban lung spaces ==
Forest blocks adjacent to major cities and towns are under development as urban parks, acting as urban "lung" spaces.The vegetation in urban open spaces acts as a sink for carbon dioxide. They reduce pollution and produce oxygen. They allow rainwater percolation and groundwater recharge in addition to facilitating stormwater drainage and flood attenuation. Other advantages provided by them to human societies include social and psychological benefits, recreation, better health, reduced stress levels, and reduced depression. The air we breathe and the water we drink are the two primary elements that decide the quality of our life. Thus when the open spaces shrink the quality of life of the people also degrade. Studies are proving that people who use public open spaces enhance their physical activity and gain better physical and mental health benefits. As of 2016, 24 urban blocks had been developed.

== Recognition ==
To encourage competition and to recognize successful implementation, the Government established the "Telangana Haritha Mithra Awards" to award stakeholders including individuals, public representatives, NGOs, Government organizations, and Corporate, Rural, and Urban bodies. The first awards were distributed on 15 August 2016. The Government established the "Telangana State Excellence Award (T-Ex Awards)" to recognize exemplary public service rendered by civil servants. The state Government proposed "Telangana Haritha Mitra Award" for the following categories:

- Individuals- General, People's representatives, Forest Department, Rural Development Department, other Government departments
- Institutions/organizations- Best District, Best Gram Panchayats, Best Municipality, Best Corporation, Best Mandal, Best Elementary School, Best High School, Best Junior College, Bëst Degree College, Best Technical College, Best University, Best Corporate Body, GHMC -1st, 2nd and 3rd Best Wards, Best Govt. Department

The awards are given at state and district levels every year in each category.

== Criticism ==
The afforestation program has faced severe criticism by tribals and environment activists.

=== Displacement v/s Afforestation ===
One of the major criticisms has been the regular displacement of indigenous tribal families from their own lands since 2015. There has been a demand for the involvement of tribals in the management of existing forests and in the implementation of this afforestation program itself.

In the recent eviction attempt, in July 2020, by the Forest Department of tribal farmers from Satyaranarayanam of Ganugapadu in Bhadradri Khotagudem district of Telangana, women and men were assaulted by the police. It was reported that large police & CRPF forces are taken along during such drives by the Forest Department.

In 2019, the tribals in Sasarla, Kagaznagar revenue division, resisted the afforestation program on lands that they cultivate and this led to unrest and clashes between the forest officials and the tribals. Counter FIRs were filed as the Forest Range Officer was attacked.

=== 'More harm than good' ===
The program only managed to increase green cover by only 163 square kilometres in two years revealed the India State of Forest Report-2019 (IFSR). Telangana was lagging behind 7 other states despite positive claims made by the government.

It was reported that since the goals are illogically high, forest officials who are supposed to be guarding the existing forests were engaged in tree plantation drives. For example, in 2016, when animal carcasses were reported, the Divisional Forest Officer couldn't reach on time busy with Haritha Haram work.
