= Coelolepida =

Coelolepida Temporal range: Mid Early Cretaceous – present

Scientific classification
- Kingdom: Animalia
- Phylum: Arthropoda
- Clade: Pancrustacea
- Class: Insecta
- Order: Lepidoptera
- Suborder: Glossata
- Clade: Coelolepida; Nielsen & Kristensen, 1996

Subdivisions
- Infraorder Acanthoctesia; Infraorder Lophocoronina; Clade Myoglossata; Infraorder Neopseustina; Clade Neolepidoptera; Infraorder Exoporia; Infraorder Heteroneura

Clade of insects

Coelolepida is a clade of insects in the lepidopteran order, containing the infraorders Acanthoctesia, Lophocoronina, Neopseustina, Exoporia and Heteroneura, with the latter three grouped in clade Myoglossata.

Coelolepida comprise all non-eriocraniid Glossata. They have scales on their wings and on the first thoracic spiracle. They do not have ocelli.

Fossils of Coelolepida have been found in the mid Early Cretaceous Series.

== See also ==
- Taxonomy of the Lepidoptera#Suborder Glossata
