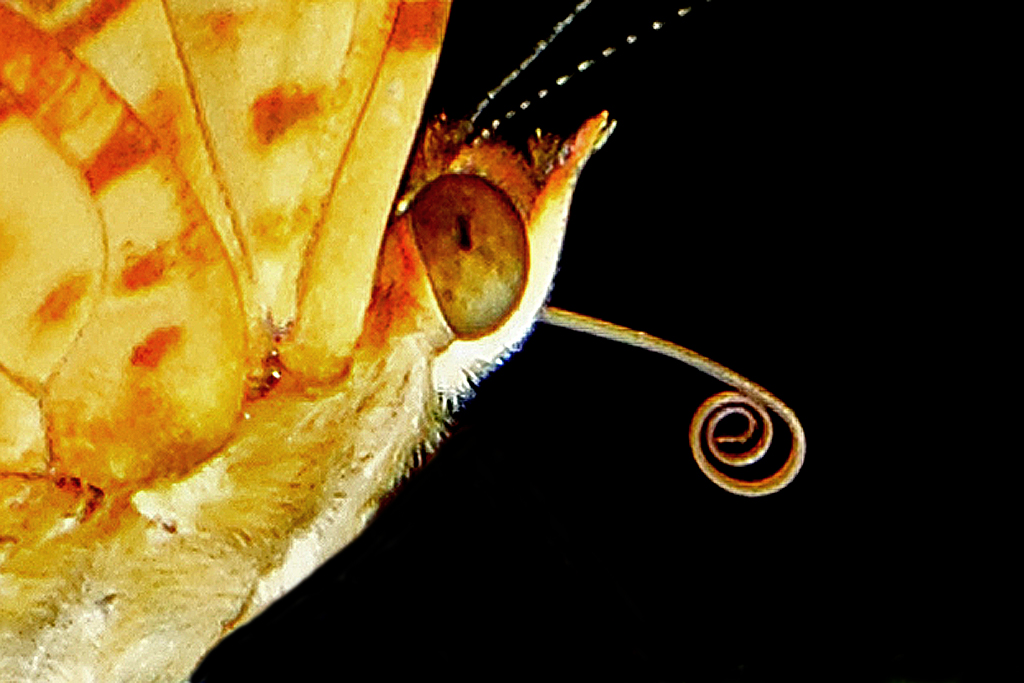
- The coiled proboscis of a butterfly

Scientific classification
- Kingdom: Animalia
- Phylum: Arthropoda
- Clade: Pancrustacea
- Class: Insecta
- Order: Lepidoptera
- Suborder: Glossata (Fabricius, 1775)

Subdivisions
- Infraorder Dacnonypha; Clade Coelolepida; Infraorder Acanthoctesia; Infraorder Lophocoronina; Clade Myoglossata; Infraorder Neopseustina; Clade Neolepidoptera; Infraorder Exoporia; Infraorder Heteroneura

= Glossata =

Suborder of moths and butterflies

Glossata (Fabricius, 1775) is a suborder of the Lepidoptera, containing all members that have a coilable proboscis; i.e., it includes all butterflies and the vast majority of moth species. The only non-Glossatan moths are in the suborders Aglossata, Heterobathmiina, and Zeugloptera.

== Taxonomy ==
Glossata contains the following six Infraorders:

- Acanthoctesia, a small family of primitive moths
- Dacnonypha, a family of moths restricted to the Holarctic region
- Exoporia, a clade of moths with a unique female reproductive system
- Heteroneura, a clade comprising 99% of all butterflies and moths
- Lophocoronina, a superfamily of moths restricted to a single genus in Australia
- Neopseustina, a small family of archaic bell moths
