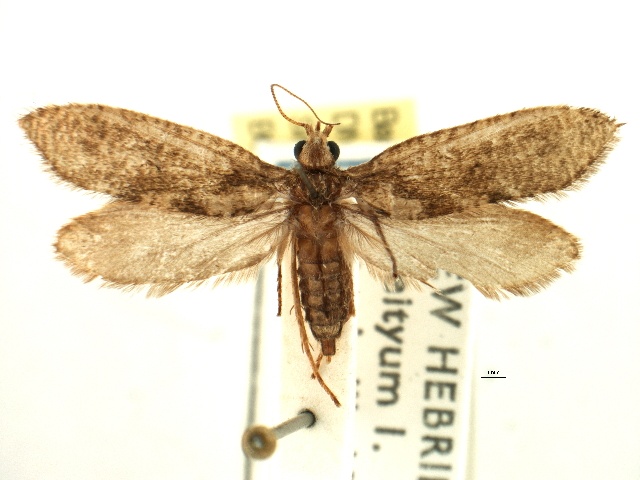

Scientific classification
- Kingdom: Animalia
- Phylum: Arthropoda
- Class: Insecta
- Order: Lepidoptera
- Family: Agathiphagidae
- Genus: Agathiphaga
- Species: A. vitiensis

Binomial name
- Agathiphaga vitiensis Dumbleton, 1952

= Agathiphaga vitiensis =

Fiji kauri moth

Species of moth

Agathiphaga vitiensis, or the Fiji kauri moth, is a moth of the family Agathiphagidae. It is found from Fiji to Vanuatu and Solomon Islands.

== Description ==
The length of the forewings is about 4 mm.

The larvae feed on Agathis vitiensis. The full-grown larva is about 6 mm long and 2.5 mm wide.

== Sensilla Morphology ==
A. vitiensis, like its relative A. queenslandensis, possesses ten different types of sensilla, which include: Bohm's bristles, Chaetica I and II, Squamiformia, Trichodea, Biforked basiconica, short basiconica, and Coeloconica I, II, and III. Both sexes of A. vitiensis possess all ten types of these sensilla, and the size of each is relatively similar in size with the exception of Chaetica I (longer in females by an average of 12.8 μm) and Trichodea (longer in males by an average of 7.8 μm).
