= Myoglossata =

Scientific classification
- Kingdom: Animalia
- Phylum: Arthropoda
- Class: Insecta
- Order: Lepidoptera
- Clade: Coelolepida
- Clade: Myoglossata; Kristensen and Nielsen, 1981

Subdivisions
- Infraorder Neopseustina; Clade Neolepidoptera; Infraorder Exoporia; Infraorder Heteroneura

Clade of butterflies and moths

Myoglossata is a clade within suborder Glossata within order Lepidoptera, the butterflies and moths. It contains the family Neopseustidae and the clade Neolepidoptera. Myoglossata is considered a clade, that is, a group of organisms made up of a single common ancestor and all of its descendants. They are distinguished by "intrinsic mouthparts". These added intrinsic galeal muscles are unique to the Myoglossata and developed after the galeae changed to form sucking parts.
