= Lophocorona pediasia =

Scientific classification
- Kingdom: Animalia
- Phylum: Arthropoda
- Clade: Pancrustacea
- Class: Insecta
- Order: Lepidoptera
- Family: Lophocoronidae
- Genus: Lophocorona
- Species: L. pediasia

Binomial name
- Lophocorona pediasia Common, 1973

Moth species in family Lophocoronidae

Lophocorona pediasia is a moth of the family Lophocoronidae. It was described by Ian Francis Bell Common in 1973 and is endemic to the arid inland areas of the southern half of Australia.

The wingspan is about 10 mm.
