= Andesiana similis =

Scientific classification
- Domain: Eukaryota
- Kingdom: Animalia
- Phylum: Arthropoda
- Class: Insecta
- Order: Lepidoptera
- Family: Andesianidae
- Genus: Andesiana
- Species: A. similis

Binomial name
- Andesiana similis Gentili, 1989

Species of moth

Andesiana similis is a moth of the Andesianidae family. It is known from Argentina (Neuquén Province).

The length of the forewings is 17.4–18.2 mm for males and about 21 mm for females. Adults fly from late October to mid-December in Nothofagus dombeyi forests with an understory of Chusquea culeou. They occur at altitudes between 640 and 950 meters.
