= Lophocorona astiptica =

Scientific classification
- Domain: Eukaryota
- Kingdom: Animalia
- Phylum: Arthropoda
- Class: Insecta
- Order: Lepidoptera
- Family: Lophocoronidae
- Genus: Lophocorona
- Species: L. astiptica

Binomial name
- Lophocorona astiptica Common, 1973

Moth species in family Lophocoronidae

Lophocorona astiptica is a species of moth of the family Lophocoronidae. It was described by Ian Francis Bell Common in 1973, and is endemic to Western Australia.
