= Agathiphaga queenslandensis =

Scientific classification
- Kingdom: Animalia
- Phylum: Arthropoda
- Clade: Pancrustacea
- Class: Insecta
- Order: Lepidoptera
- Family: Agathiphagidae
- Genus: Agathiphaga
- Species: A. queenslandensis

Binomial name
- Agathiphaga queenslandensis Dumbleton, 1952

Species of moth

Agathiphaga queenslandensis is a moth of the family Agathiphagidae. It is found along the north-eastern coast of Queensland, Australia.

The wingspan is about 13 mm.

In both the male and female A. queenslandensis, there are ten types of sensilla: Böhm's bristles, Chaetica I, Chaetica II, Squamiformia, Trichodea, Biforked basiconica, Short basiconica, Coeloconica I, Coeloconica II, and Coeloconic III.

In the female A. queenslandensis they have forty-seven segments, such as the scapes and pedicel on their antenna, which measures to be 3.84 mm long. The two segments are known to be covered in scales in the front and back of their bodies.

The larvae feed on Agathis robusta.
