= Andesiana brunnea =

Scientific classification
- Domain: Eukaryota
- Kingdom: Animalia
- Phylum: Arthropoda
- Class: Insecta
- Order: Lepidoptera
- Family: Andesianidae
- Genus: Andesiana
- Species: A. brunnea

Binomial name
- Andesiana brunnea Gentili, 1989

Species of moth

Andesiana brunnea is a moth of the Andesianidae family. It is known from a single specimen from Argentina (Isla Victoria, Nahuel Huapi Lake, Neuquen).

The single specimen was caught in early October.
