= Lophocorona robinsoni =

Scientific classification
- Kingdom: Animalia
- Phylum: Arthropoda
- Clade: Pancrustacea
- Class: Insecta
- Order: Lepidoptera
- Family: Lophocoronidae
- Genus: Lophocorona
- Species: L. robinsoni

Binomial name
- Lophocorona robinsoni Nielsen & Kristensen, 1996

Moth species in family Lophocoronidae

Lophocorona robinsoni is a moth of the family Lophocoronidae. It was described by Nielsen and Kristensen in 1996, and is only known from New South Wales.
