= Lophocorona melanora =

Scientific classification
- Kingdom: Animalia
- Phylum: Arthropoda
- Clade: Pancrustacea
- Class: Insecta
- Order: Lepidoptera
- Family: Lophocoronidae
- Genus: Lophocorona
- Species: L. melanora

Binomial name
- Lophocorona melanora Common, 1973

Moth species in family Lophocoronidae

Lophocorona melanora is a moth of the family Lophocoronidae. It was described by Ian Francis Bell Common in 1973. It is only known from the Australian Alps in the Australian Capital Territory.
