= Andesiana lamellata =

Scientific classification
- Domain: Eukaryota
- Kingdom: Animalia
- Phylum: Arthropoda
- Class: Insecta
- Order: Lepidoptera
- Family: Andesianidae
- Genus: Andesiana
- Species: A. lamellata

Binomial name
- Andesiana lamellata Gentili, 1989

Species of moth

Andesiana lamellata is a moth of the Andesianidae family. It is known from Argentina (Neuquen and Rio Negro) and Chile (Malleco and Valdivia).

The length of the forewings is 15.7–26.1 millimetres (0.62–1.03 in) for males and 21.5–26.1 mm (0.85–1.03 in) for females.

Adults fly from late September to mid January, with isolated records in February and April in Nothofagus pumilio and Nothofagus antarctica forests. They occur on altitudes of 100–1,750 metres (330–5,740 ft).
