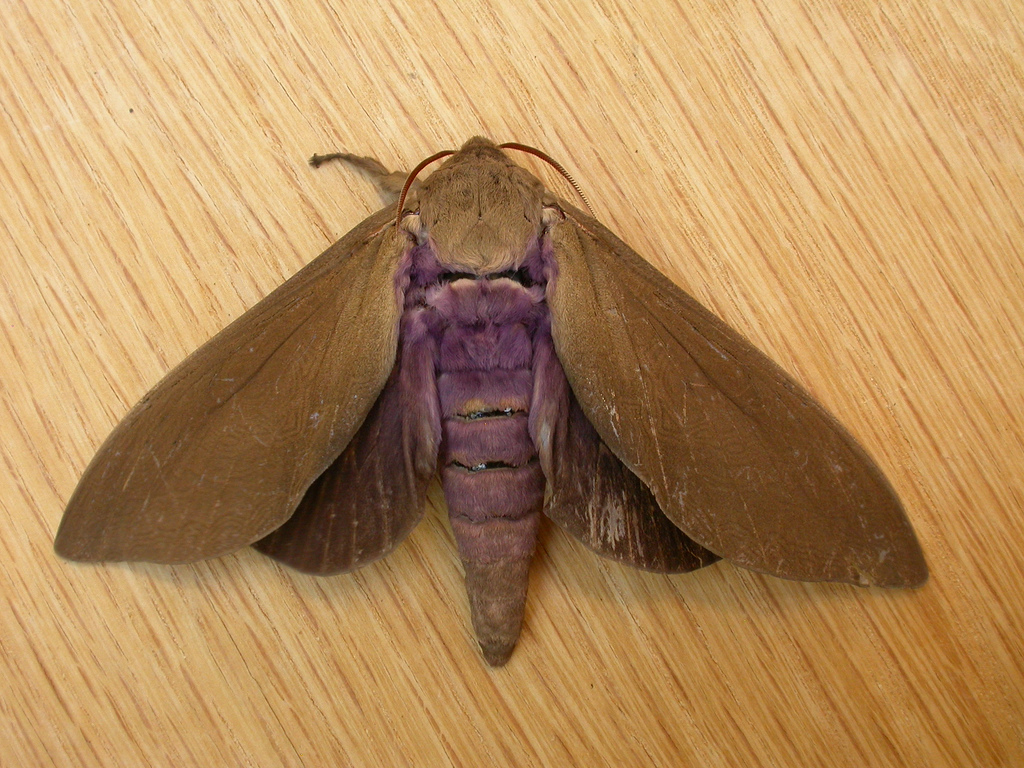
- A specimen of Abantiades hyalinatus

Scientific classification
- Kingdom: Animalia
- Phylum: Arthropoda
- Clade: Pancrustacea
- Class: Insecta
- Order: Lepidoptera
- Clade: Myoglossata
- Clade: Neolepidoptera

Subdivisions
- Infraorder Exoporia; Infraorder Heteroneura

= Neolepidoptera =

Clade of butterflies and moths

Neolepidoptera (/ˌniː.oʊˌlɛpɪˈdɒptərə/) is a clade within Myoglossata in suborder Glossata of order Lepidoptera, the butterflies and moths. They differ from other Myoglossata in the larval stage abdominal prolegs, pupal morphology, and the mandibles are reduced in area. They also differ in their reproductive systems. The prolegs have muscles and apical hooklets. The reproductive organs have two openings. There are also differences in the wing structure. The pupae are "incomplete or obtect."
