= Andesiana =

Scientific classification
- Kingdom: Animalia
- Phylum: Arthropoda
- Clade: Pancrustacea
- Class: Insecta
- Order: Lepidoptera
- Infraorder: Heteroneura
- Clade: Eulepidoptera
- Clade: Incurvariina
- Superfamily: Andesianoidea; Davis and Gentili, 2003
- Family: Andesianidae; Davis and Gentili, 2003
- Genus: Andesiana; Gentili, 1989

Type species
- Andesiana lamellata Gentili, 1989

Species
- Andesiana lamellata Gentili, 1989; Andesiana brunnea Gentili, 1989; Andesiana similis Gentili, 1989

Diversity
- 1 genus and 3 species

Genus of moths

Andesiana is a genus representing its own family Andesianidae and superfamily Andesianoidea, the "Andean endemic moths". It contains three species with a wingspan up to 5.4 cm. in female A. similis and 3.5 cm. in males. This far surpasses in size any previously known monotrysian moth. These large Microlepidoptera are restricted to Andean South America, from where they were described originally in 1989 in the family Cossidae by their discoverer Patricia Gentili.

== Systematics ==
The vein "R2" in the hindwing is two-branched, suggesting that the family Andesianidae is basal to the superfamily Nepticulidae, but the way the wings are coupled suggests it had a later origination within the Monotrysia, where it can be placed based on characters of the female reproductive system. The relationships of Andesiana with representatives of other lepidopteran superfamilies is currently under investigation using DNA sequences .

== Morphology and identification ==
The labial palpi have an elongated second segment, the tibia of the male hindleg has a "hairpencil" contained in a pouch on the femur, and the antennae are "bipectinate" in the male and "filiform" in the female; the proboscis is much reduced.

== Distribution ==
The genus is found in Nothofagus forests of Andean Chile and Argentina.

== Nomenclatural notes ==
Lepindex accessed March 2007 incorrectly places the species "neurotenes Turner 1932" from Queensland in the genus "Andesiana, Gentili, 1986" of which the database suggests Archaeoses Turner, 1932 (a cossid )is a junior subjective synonym. Presumably this is not to be confused with an Oecophoridae moth of the same name neurotenes described by Turner in the genus Antiopala in 1939 and currently placed in the genus Prepalla
