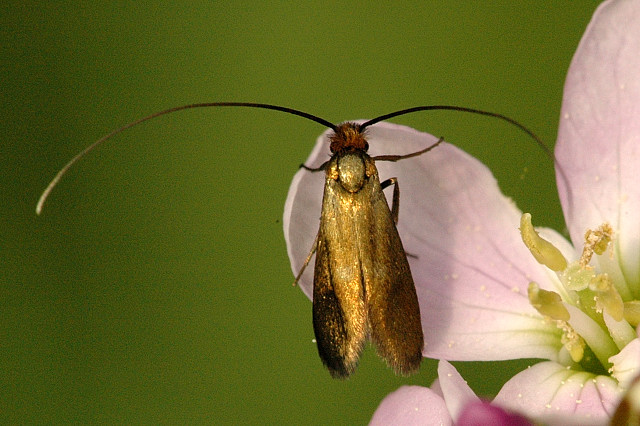
- Cuckoo flower longhorn moth, Cauchas rufimitrella

Scientific classification
- Kingdom: Animalia
- Phylum: Arthropoda
- Clade: Pancrustacea
- Class: Insecta
- Order: Lepidoptera
- Infraorder: Heteroneura
- (unranked): Monotrysia

Superfamilies
- Monotrysia (Börner, 1939): Adeloidea; Andesianoidea; Palaephatoidea; Tischerioidea; Nepticuloidea

= Monotrysia =

Group of moths

The Monotrysia are a group of moths in the lepidopteran order, not currently considered to be a natural group or clade. The group is so named because the female has a single genital opening for mating and laying eggs, in contrast to the rest of the Lepidoptera (Ditrysia), which have two female reproductive openings. Later classifications used Monotrysia in a narrower sense for the nonditrysian Heteroneura, but this group was also found to be paraphyletic with respect to Ditrysia. Apart from the recently discovered family Andesianidae, most of the group consists of small, relatively understudied species.

== See also ==
- Lepidoptera § History of study
