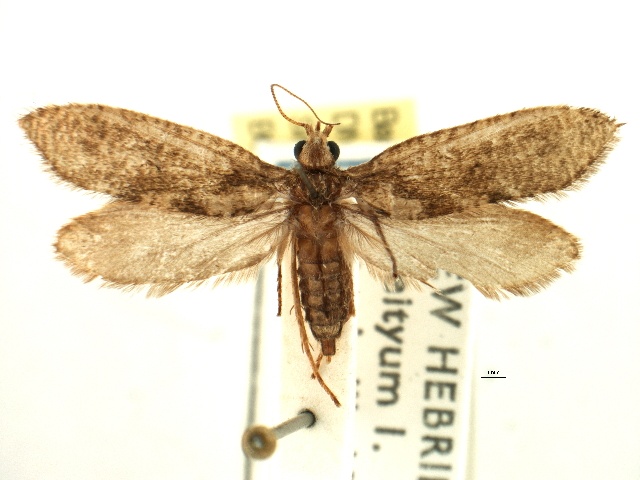
- Agathiphaga vitiensis

Scientific classification
- Kingdom: Animalia
- Phylum: Arthropoda
- Clade: Pancrustacea
- Class: Insecta
- Order: Lepidoptera
- Suborder: Aglossata; Speidel, 1977
- Superfamily: Agathiphagoidea; N. P. Kristensen, 1967
- Family: Agathiphagidae; N. P. Kristensen, 1967
- Genus: Agathiphaga; Dumbleton, 1952

Species
- A. queenslandensis Dumbleton, 1952; A. vitiensis Dumbleton, 1952

= Agathiphaga =

Genus of moths

Agathiphaga is a genus of moths, known as kauri moths, and is the only living genus in the family Agathiphagidae. This caddisfly-like lineage of moths was first reported by Lionel Jack Dumbleton in 1952, as a new genus of Micropterigidae.

The genus Agathiphaga (family Agathiphagidae) belongs to one of the most 'basal' clades of Lepidoptera, lacking a functional proboscis – an ancestral trait shared with Micropterigoidea (representing the earliest known divergence among living Lepidoptera) and the genus Heterobathmia (family Heterobathmiidae). Agathiphagidae form the sister group to a clade encompassing Heterobathmiidae and Glossata (the proboscis-bearing butterflies and moths). The caterpillars feed exclusively on the sapwood of kauri trees (Agathis spp.) The larvae have been reported to be able to survive for 12 years in diapause, durability possibly a prerequisite to its possible dispersion around the Pacific islands in the seeds of Agathis.

Dumbleton described two species. Agathiphaga queenslandensis is found along the north-eastern coast of Queensland, Australia, and its larvae feed on Agathis robusta. Agathiphaga vitiensis is found from Fiji to Vanuatu and the Solomon Islands, and its larvae feed on Agathis vitiensis.

A fossil member of Agathiphagidae, Agathiphagama, is known from the Burmese amber of Myanmar, dating to the early Cenomanian stage of the Late Cretaceous, approximately 99 million years ago.
