= Transverse orientation =

Keeping a fixed angle on a distant source of light for orientation

Transverse orientation, keeping a fixed angle on a distant source of light for orientation, is a proprioceptive response displayed by some insects such as moths.

By maintaining a constant angular relationship to a bright celestial light, such as the moon, they can fly in a straight line. Celestial objects are so far away that, even after travelling great distances, the change in angle between the moth and the light source is negligible; further, the moon will always be in the upper part of the visual field, or on the horizon. When a moth encounters a much closer artificial light and uses it for navigation, the angle changes noticeably after only a short distance, in addition to being often below the horizon. The moth instinctively attempts to correct by turning toward the light, resulting in a spiral flight path that gets closer and closer to the light source.
