= Beondegi =

Korean silkworm pupae street food dish

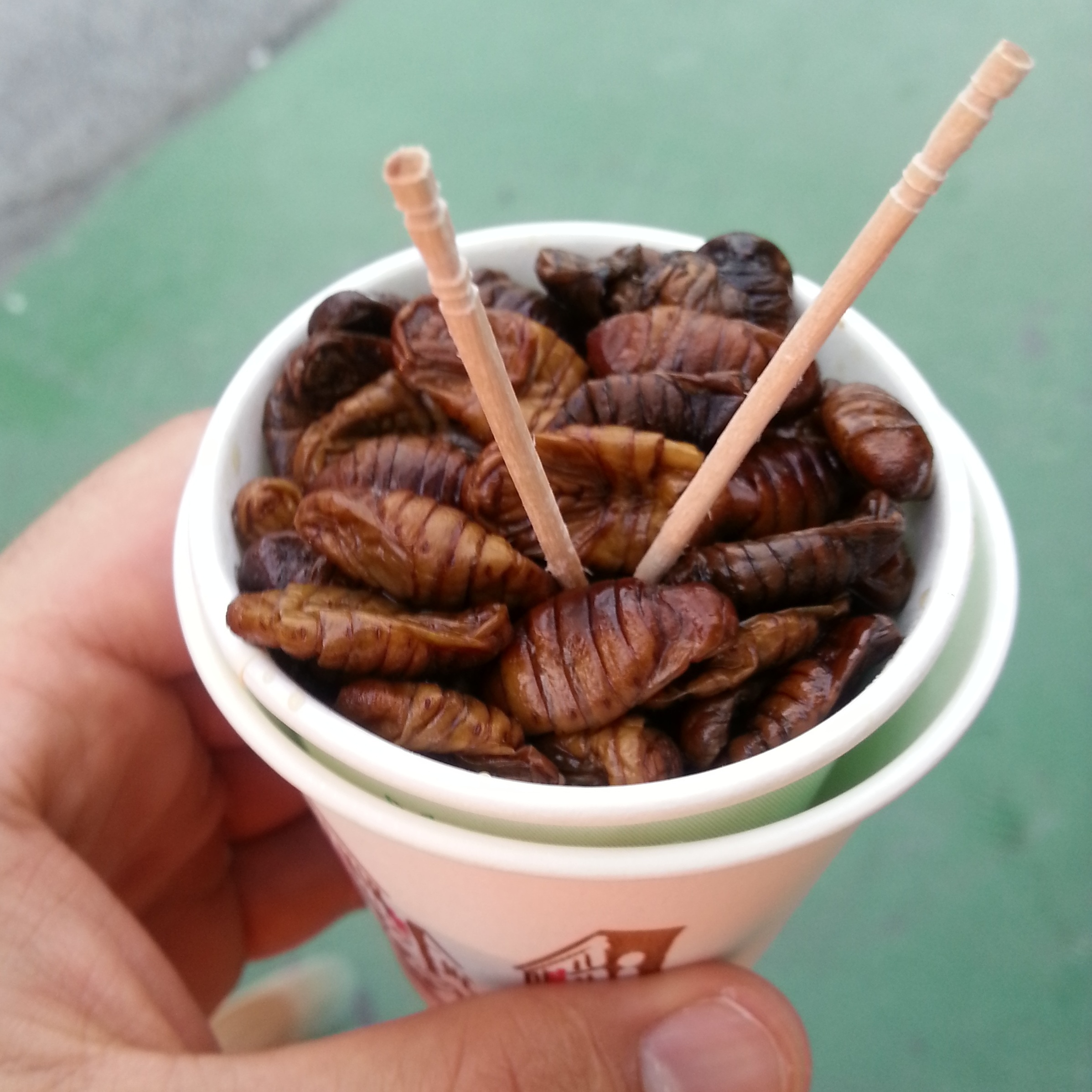
- Beondegi in a cup, with toothpicks as utensils
- Course: Street food
- Associated cuisine: Korean cuisine
- Main ingredients: Silkworm pupae
- Similar dishes: Nhộng tằm

Korean name
- Hangul: 번데기
- RR: beondegi
- MR: pŏndegi
- IPA: pʌn.de.ɡi

Beondegi (Korean: 번데기), literally "pupa", is a Korean insect-based street food made with silkworm pupae. Silkworm pupae are a by-product of sericulture, an agricultural practice for the production of silk. The consumption of Beondegi was historically popular in silk producing areas, but in recent years has been widely consumed as a street food across South Korea.

== Production and preparation ==
The boiled or steamed snack food is served in paper cups with toothpick skewers. Its aroma has been described as "nutty, shrimp-like, and a bit like canned corn" and the canned-type smells very much "like tire rubber", while the texture is firm and chewy. Beondegi is also served in soup form as beondegi-tang. This soup is flavoured with soy sauce, chili, garlic, green onions and red pepper powder. It is typically served as an anju (food consumed with alcohol) at pubs. Canned beondegi and beondegi-tang can also be found in supermarkets and convenience stores.

== History ==
Although sericulture in Korea dates back 4,000 years, consumption of silkworm pupae—a byproduct of extracting the raw silk fiber from the cocoon—is a relatively recent addition to Korean cuisine. While silkworm pupae were consumed in silk-farming villages at least as far back as the 1920s, widespread consumption in South Korea began after the Korean War. After the war, the government heavily promoted raw silk production as an export industry with low technological or capital barriers to entry, and leftover pupae served as a partial remedy to the widespread poverty and food insecurity of the time.

By the 1970s, the overflow of the byproduct provided a cheap source of protein before economic growth allowed broader access to meat supply.

== Nutrition ==
Silkworm pupae are a nutrient-dense food, containing approximately 55–60% protein by dry weight, along with significant levels of unsaturated fatty acids, iron, zinc, and B vitamins. They provide a high-quality protein source comparable to beef or fish, making them a valuable dietary component in contexts of food insecurity.
