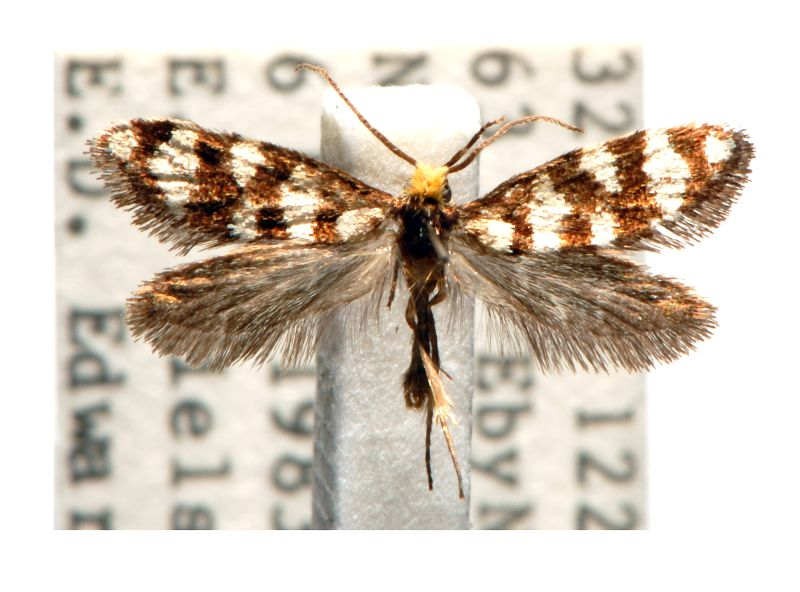
- Lophocorona commoni

Scientific classification
- Kingdom: Animalia
- Phylum: Arthropoda
- Clade: Pancrustacea
- Class: Insecta
- Order: Lepidoptera
- Clade: Coelolepida
- Infraorder: Lophocoronina; Common, 1990
- Superfamily: Lophocoronoidea; Common, 1973
- Family: Lophocoronidae; Common, 1973
- Genus: Lophocorona; Common, 1973

Species
- Lophocorona astiptica Common, 1973; Lophocorona commoni Nielsen & Kristensen, 1996; Lophocorona flavicosta Nielsen & Kristensen, 1996; Lophocorona melanora Common, 1973; Lophocorona pediasia Common, 1973; Lophocorona robinsoni Nielsen & Kristensen, 1996

Diversity
- about 6 species

= Lophocoronoidea =

Lophocoronoidea Temporal range: Cenomanian–Recent

Monogeneric superfamily of moths

Lophocoronoidea is a superfamily of insects in the order Lepidoptera. There is a single extant genus, Lophocorona, in the family Lophocoronidae. These are small, primitive nocturnal moths restricted to Australia whose biology is largely unknown (Common, 1990; Kristensen and Nielsen, 1996; Kristensen, 1999).

A fossil genus Acanthocorona is known from the Burmese amber of Myanmar, dating to the early Cenomanian stage of the Late Cretaceous, approximately 99 million years ago.

== Fossil species ==
- Acanthocorona Mey, Léger & Lien, 2021
  - A. skalskii (type)
  - A. muelleri
  - A. bowangi
  - A. wichardi
  - A. kuranishii
  - A. sattleri
  - A. spinifera

== Sources ==
- Firefly Encyclopedia of Insects and Spiders, edited by Christopher O'Toole, ISBN 1-55297-612-2, 2002
