= Lionel Jack Dumbleton =

New Zealand entomologist

Lionel Jack Dumbleton (1905 – 25 September 1976) was a New Zealand entomologist. He was born in Hampden, New Zealand and was a founding member of the Entomological Society of New Zealand. Dumbleton was one of the entomologists studying insects on the 1949 New Zealand American Fiordland Expedition.

One of his most remarkable biological discoveries was a new genus of caddis-fly-like primitive moths that he described as Agathiphaga and which has been subsequently raised to superfamily level as the second most primitive known living lineage of moths, Agathiphagoidea.

Shortly before retiring, Dumbleton survived a stroke.

In 1998 a new genus of hepialid moths was named Dumbletonius in his honour, and Hort Research has a building in Auckland named after him.
