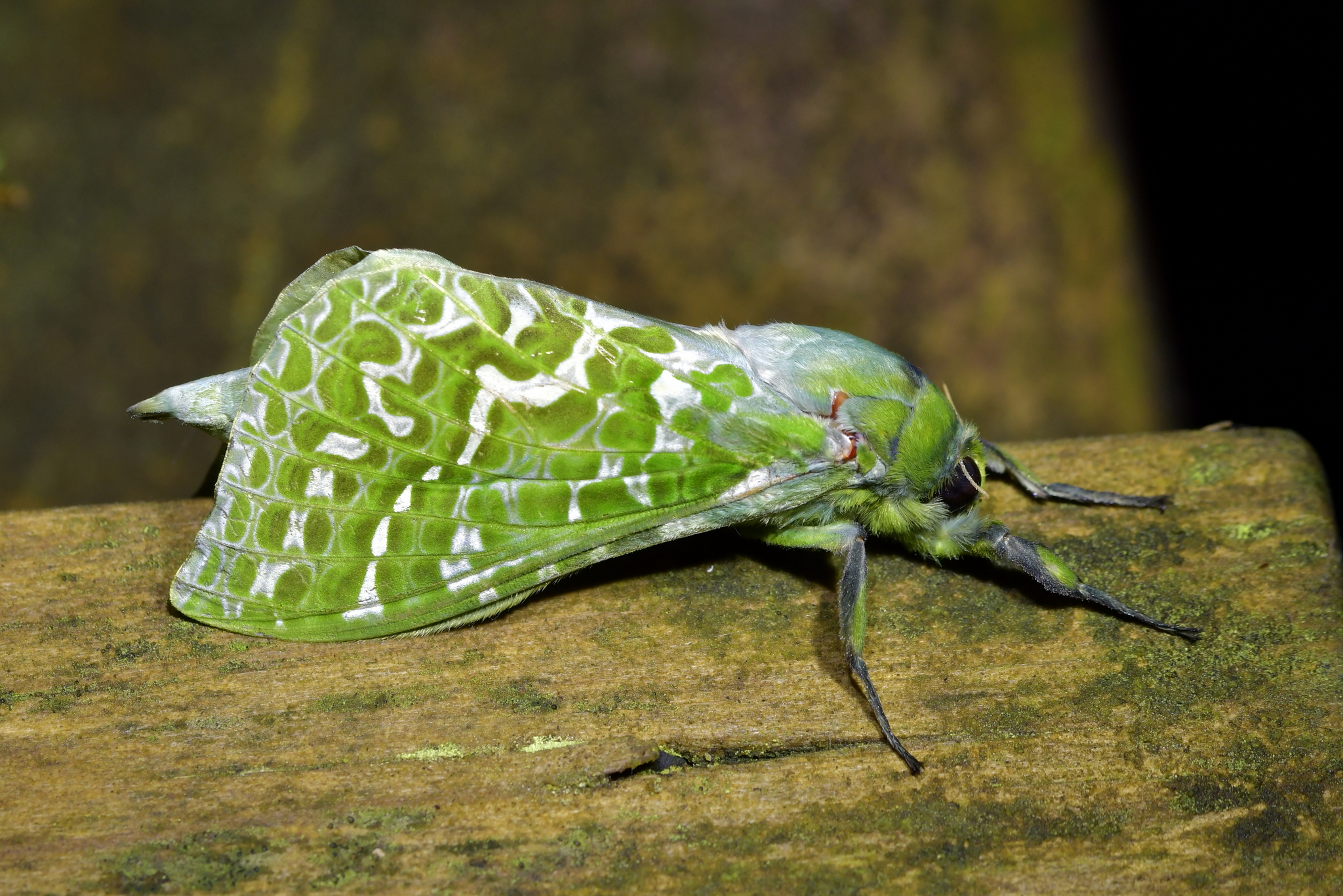
- Aenetus virescens

Scientific classification
- Domain: Eukaryota
- Kingdom: Animalia
- Phylum: Arthropoda
- Class: Insecta
- Order: Lepidoptera
- Clade: Neolepidoptera
- Infraorder: Exoporia

Superfamilies
- Mnesarchaeoidea; Hepialoidea

Diversity
- 68 genera and at least 625 species

= Exoporia =

Clade of moths

The Exoporia are a group of primitive Lepidoptera comprising the superfamilies Mnesarchaeoidea and Hepialoidea. They are a natural group or clade. Exoporia is the sister group of the lepidopteran infraorder Heteroneura. They are characterised by their unique female reproductive system which has an external groove between the ostium bursae and the ovipore by which the sperm is transferred to the egg rather than having the mating and egg-laying parts of the abdomen with a common opening (cloaca) as in other nonditrysian moths, or with separate openings linked internally by a "ductus seminalis" as in the Ditrysia. See Kristensen (1999: 57) for other exoporian characteristics.

== See also ==
- Ditrysia
- Heteroneura
- Monotrysia
