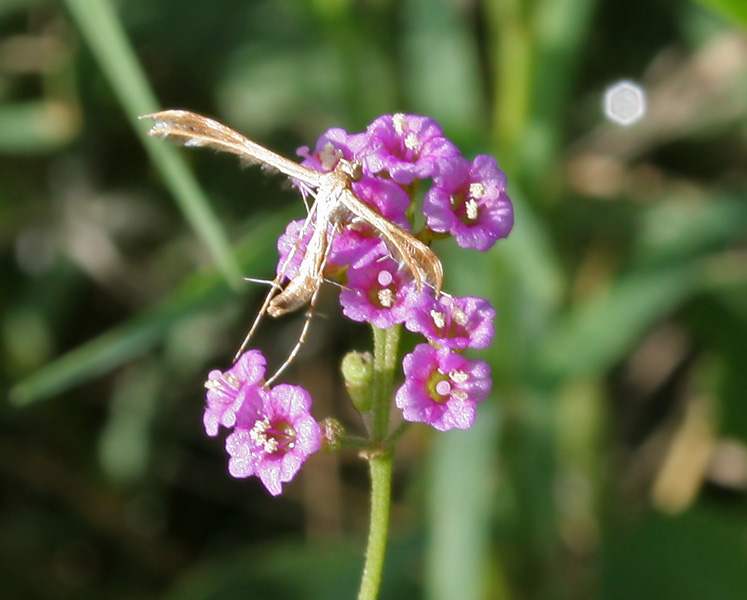
- Plume moth from family Pterophoridae on Boerhavia diffusa in Hyderabad, India.

Scientific classification
- Kingdom: Animalia
- Phylum: Arthropoda
- Clade: Pancrustacea
- Class: Insecta
- Order: Lepidoptera
- Clade: Neolepidoptera
- Infraorder: Heteroneura

Subdivisions
- Nepticulina; Superfamily Nepticuloidea; Eulepidoptera; Incurvariina; Superfamily Andesianoidea; Superfamily Adeloidea; Etimonotrysia; Superfamily Palaephatoidea; Superfamily Tischerioidea; Ditrysia

= Heteroneura =

Clade of butterflies and moths

Heteroneura is a clade in the insect order Lepidoptera that comprises over 99% of all butterflies and moths. Its monophyly has been strongly supported by molecular evidence. Heteroneura is the sister group to the infraorder Exoporia (swift moths and their relatives), and is characterised by wing venation which is not similar— i.e., homoneurous— in both pairs of wings.

Though early patterns of divergence within the Heteroneura have not yet been ascertained with much confidence, the leaf-mining Nepticuloidea appear to be the sister group to all other members of the clade. Species in this subgroup include some of the smallest lepidopterans identified.
