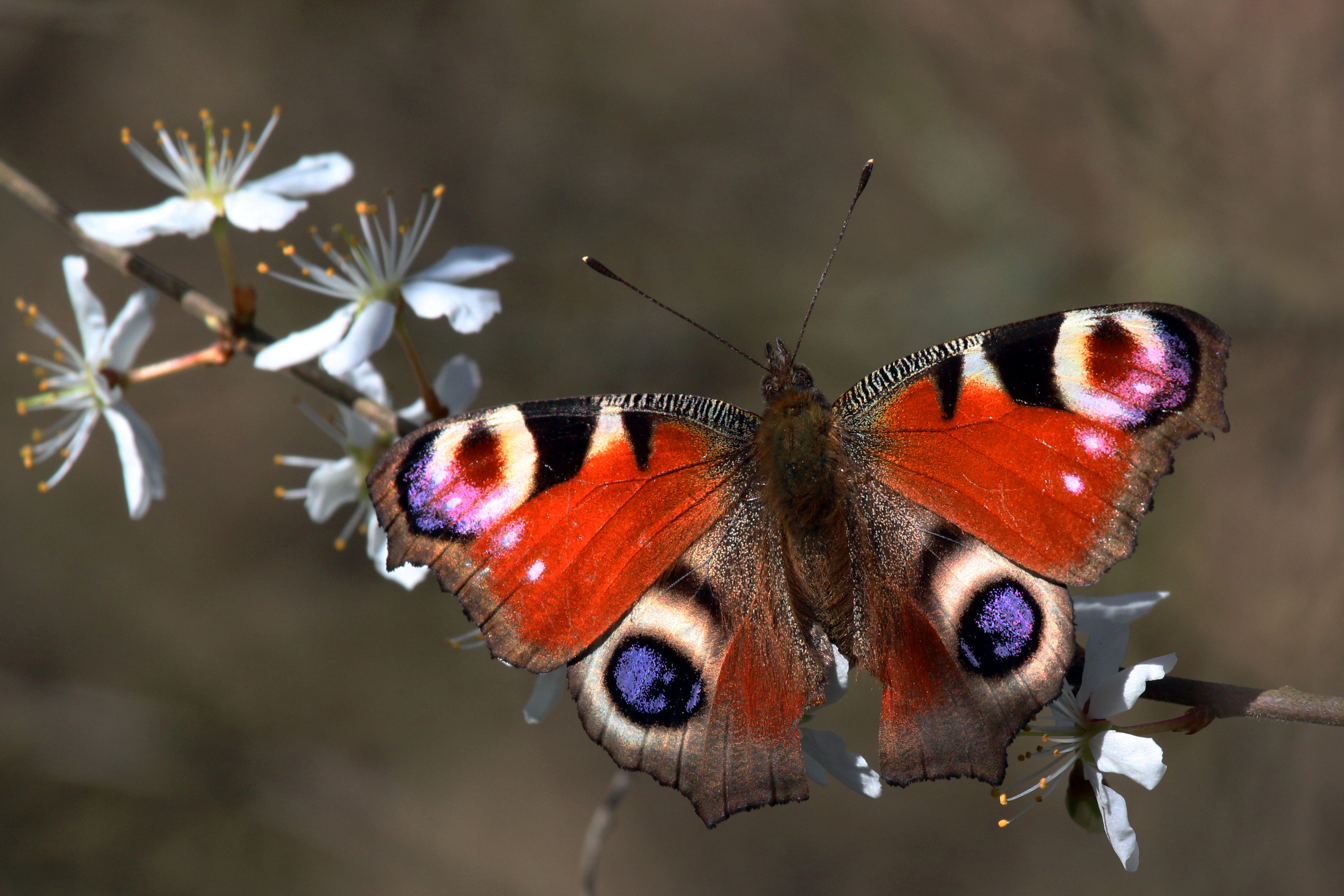
- Peacock butterfly (Aglais io)
- Elephant hawk moth (Deilephila elpenor)

Scientific classification
- Kingdom: Animalia
- Phylum: Arthropoda
- Clade: Pancrustacea
- Class: Insecta
- Clade: Amphiesmenoptera
- Order: Lepidoptera; Linnaeus, 1758

Subdivisions
- Aglossata; Glossata; Heterobathmiina; Zeugloptera

= Lepidoptera =

Lepidoptera Temporal range: Early Jurassic–Present, 200–0 Ma Possible Late Triassic records

Order of insects including moths and butterflies

Lepidoptera (/ˌlɛpɪˈdɒptərə/ LEP-ih-DOP-tər-ə) or lepidopterans are an order of winged insects which include butterflies and moths. About 180,000 species of the Lepidoptera have been described, representing 8.6% of the total described species of living organisms, making it the second largest insect order (behind Coleoptera) with 133 families and 43 superfamilies, and one of the most widespread and widely recognizable insect orders in the world.

Lepidopterans have several distinctive features, especially colored scales that cover their bodies, large triangular wings, and a proboscis for drinking nectar. Almost all species have membranous wings. Mating and egg-laying are normally near or on host plants for the larvae. Butterflies and moths undergo complete metamorphosis. The larva is called a caterpillar; it has a cylindrical body with a well-developed head, chewing mouthparts, three pairs of legs and up to five pairs of prolegs. As it grows, it changes in appearance, going through a series of stages called instars. Once mature, it develops into a pupa. A few butterflies and many moth species spin a silk casing or cocoon for protection prior to pupating, while others just go underground. A butterfly pupa, called a chrysalis, has a hard skin, usually with no cocoon. In the pupa, metamorphosis occurs, and a sexually mature adult emerges.

Lepidopterans first appeared in the fossil record at the Triassic-Jurassic boundary. They have coevolved with flowering plants since the angiosperm boom in the Cretaceous. They have evolved a wide range of wing patterns ranging from camouflaged moths to the vivid displays of butterflies. A person who studies this order is called a lepidopterist.

Butterflies and moths are mostly herbivorous as caterpillars and nectar-feeding as adults. They serve as economically useful pollinators; conversely, caterpillars are often pests in agriculture, as they can quickly consume large quantities of leaves. Females often produce up to 600 eggs.

== Etymology ==
The term Lepidoptera was used in 1746 by Carl Linnaeus in his Fauna Svecica. The word is derived from Greek λεπίς lepís, gen. λεπίδος lepídos ("scale") and πτερόν ("wing"). The word "butterfly" is from Old English buttorfleoge, possibly from the pale butter color of some species' wings. The word "moth" is from Old English moððe from Common Germanic and German Motte meaning "moth". The word "caterpillar" is from Middle English catirpel, catirpeller, probably an alteration of Old North French catepelose (from Latin cattus, "cat" + pilosus, "hairy").

== Distribution and diversity ==
The Lepidoptera are among the most successful groups of insects. They are found on all continents, except Antarctica, and inhabit all terrestrial habitats ranging from desert to rainforest, from lowland grasslands to mountain plateaus, but almost always associated with higher plants, especially angiosperms (flowering plants). Among the most northern dwelling species of butterflies and moths is the Siberian Apollo (Parnassius arcticus), found in the Arctic Circle in northeastern Yakutia, at an altitude of 1,500 metres (4,900 ft) above sea level. In the Himalayas, Apollo species such as Parnassius epaphus occur up to an altitude of 6,000 metres (20,000 ft).

Some species are commensal or parasitic, inhabiting the bodies of organisms rather than the environment. Coprophagous pyralid moths, called sloth moths, such as Bradipodicola hahneli and Cryptoses choloepi, are unusual in that they are exclusively found in the fur of sloths. Two species of Tinea moths feed and breed on the horns of cattle. The larva of Zenodochium coccivorella is an internal parasite of Kermes scale insects. Many species breed in materials such as owl pellets, bat caves, honeycombs or diseased fruit.

As of 2007, there were roughly 174,250 lepidopteran species described, with butterflies estimated to comprise around 17,950, and moths making up the rest. The vast majority live in the tropics, but substantial diversity exists on most continents. North America has over 700 species of butterflies and over 11,000 species of moths, while Australia has about 400 species of butterflies and 14,000 species of moths. The diversity in each faunal region has been estimated by John Heppner in 1991 based partly on actual counts from the literature, partly on the card indices in the Natural History Museum (London) and the National Museum of Natural History (Washington), and partly on estimates:

Diversity of Lepidoptera in each faunal region
| | Palearctic | Nearctic | Neotropic | Afrotropic | Indo-Australian (comprising Indomalayan, Australasian, and Oceanian realms) |
| Estimated number of species | 22,465 | 11,532 | 44,791 | 20,491 | 47,287 |

== External morphology ==
Parts of an adult butterfly

A – head, B – thorax, C – abdomen, 1 – prothoracic shield, 2 – spiracle, 3 – true legs, 4 – midabdominal prolegs, 5 – anal proleg, 6 – anal plate, 7 – tentacle, a – eye, b – stemmata (ocelli), c – antenna, d – mandible, e – labrum, f – frontal triangle.

Lepidoptera are morphologically distinguished from other orders by the presence of scales on the body and appendages, especially the wings. Butterflies and moths vary in size from microlepidoptera only a few millimeters long, to conspicuous animals with a wingspan greater than 25 centimetres (9.8 in), such as Queen Alexandra's birdwing and Atlas moth.

=== Head ===
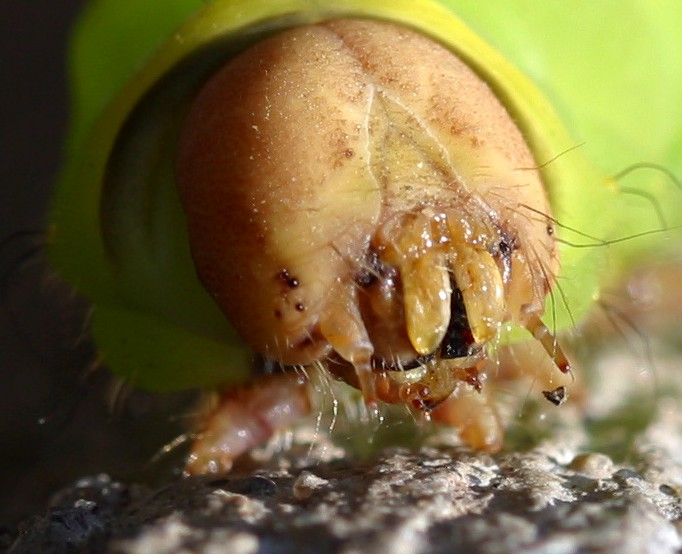
Face of a caterpillar with the mouthparts showing

The head houses sensing organs and mouthparts. Like the adult, the larva has a toughened, or sclerotized head capsule. Here, two compound eyes, and chaetosema, clusters of sensory bristles unique to Lepidoptera, occur, though many taxa have lost one or both of these clusters. The antennae vary widely in form among species and between the sexes. The antennae of butterflies are usually club-shaped, those of the skippers are hooked, while those of moths have segments variously enlarged or branched.

The maxillary galeae are modified to form an elongated proboscis. It consists of one to five segments, kept coiled up under the head by small muscles when it is not being used to suck up nectar from flowers.

The larvae, called caterpillars, have a toughened head capsule. Caterpillars lack the proboscis and have separate chewing mouthparts. These mouthparts, called mandibles, are used to chew up the plant matter that the larvae eat. The lower jaw, or labium, is weak, but may carry a spinneret, an organ used to create silk. The head is made of large lateral lobes, each having a group of up to six simple eyes.

=== Thorax ===
The thorax is made of three fused segments, the prothorax, mesothorax, and metathorax, each with a pair of legs. In some males of the butterfly family Nymphalidae, the forelegs are greatly reduced and are not used for walking or perching. Lepidoptera have olfactory organs on their feet, which help them to "taste" or "smell" their food.

The two pairs of wings are on the middle and third segments, or mesothorax and metathorax, respectively. In the more recent genera, the wings of the second segment are much more pronounced, while some more primitive forms have similarly sized wings of both segments. The wings are covered in scales arranged like shingles, which form an extraordinary variety of colors and patterns. The mesothorax has more powerful muscles to propel the moth or butterfly through the air, with the wing of this segment (forewing) having a stronger vein structure. The largest superfamily, the Noctuoidea, has its wings modified as hearing organs.

The caterpillar has an elongated, soft body that may have hair-like scales, three pairs of true legs, with none to 11 pairs of abdominal prolegs (usually eight) with hook-like spines for gripping called crochets. The thorax usually has a pair of legs on each segment. The thorax is also lined with many spiracles on both the mesothorax and metathorax, except for a few aquatic species, which instead have a form of gills.

=== Abdomen ===
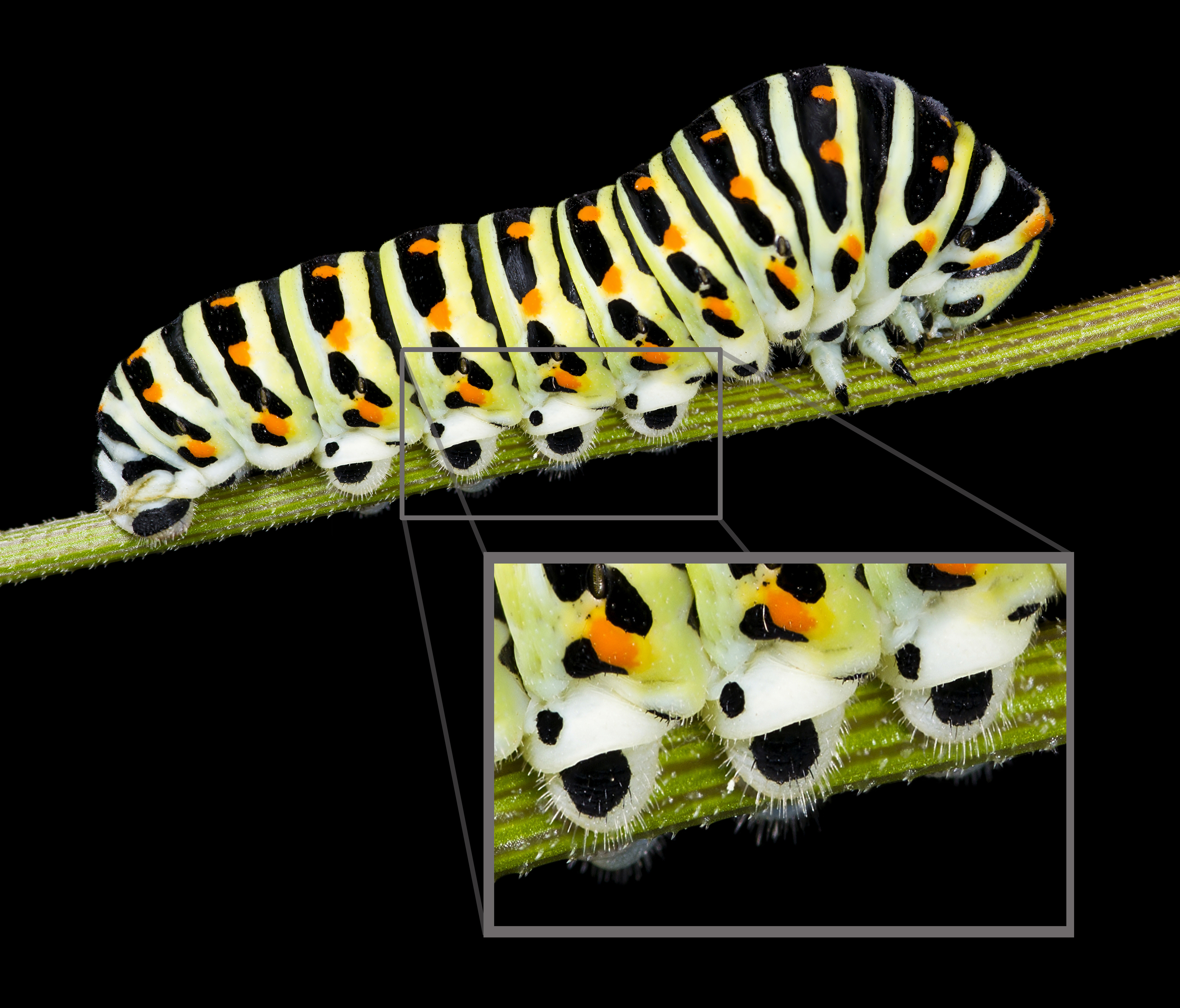
Caterpillar prolegs on Papilio machaon

The abdomen, less sclerotized than the thorax, consists of 10 segments, the first sometimes reduced. The last two segments form the external genitalia. The genitalia are highly varied, and distinguish the species. The females of basal moths have only one sex organ, which is used for copulation and as an ovipositor, or egg-laying organ. About 98% of moth species have a separate organ for mating, and an external duct that carries the sperm from the male.

The abdomen of the caterpillar has four pairs of prolegs, normally located on the third to sixth segments of the abdomen, and a separate pair of prolegs by the anus, which have a pair of tiny hooks called crotchets. These aid in gripping and walking, especially in species that lack many prolegs (e. g. larvae of Geometridae). In some basal moths, these prolegs may be on every segment of the body, while prolegs may be completely absent in other groups more adapted to boring (e. g., Prodoxidae) or living in sand (e.g. Nepticulidae).

=== Scales ===
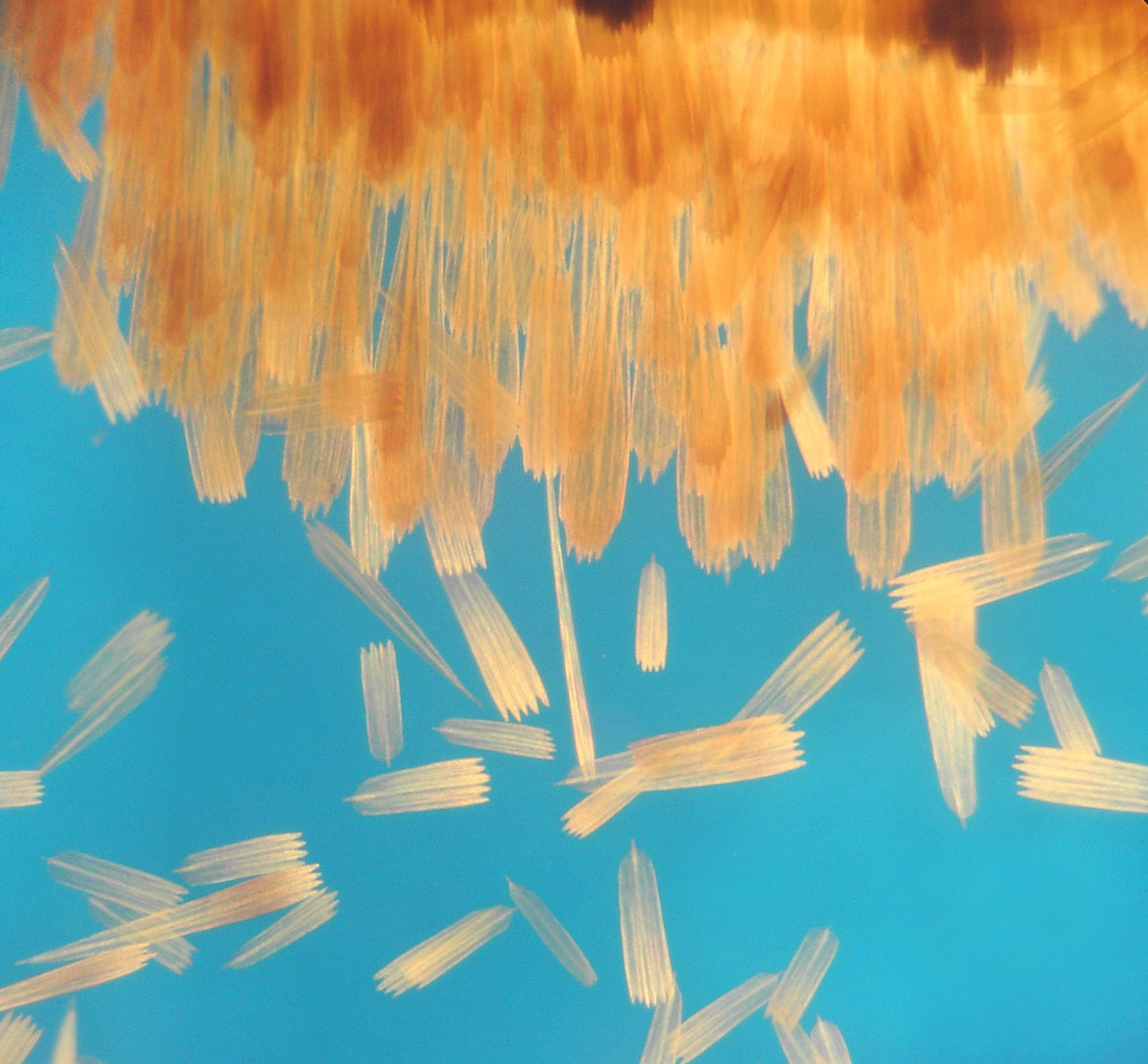
Wing scales form the color and pattern on wings. The scales shown here are lamellar. The pedicel can be seen attached to a few loose scales.

Much of the body is covered with minute scales. Most are lamellar, or blade-like, and attached with a pedicel. The surface of the lamella has a complex structure. It gives color through structural coloration, and may also be pigmented. Scales function in insulation, thermoregulation, producing pheromones (in males only), and aiding gliding flight, but the most important is the large diversity of patterns they create, enabling camouflage, mimicry, signalling to rivals, and potential mates. Hair-like (filamentous) scales around the head and abdomen are common, especially in moths.

== Internal morphology ==
=== Reproductive system ===
In the reproductive system of butterflies and moths, the male genitalia are complex. In females the three types of genitalia are named for the associated moth clades: 'monotrysian', 'exoporian', and 'ditrysian'. In the monotrysian type there is an opening on the fused segments of the sterna 9 and 10, which allows insemination and oviposition. In the exoporian type (in Hepialoidea and Mnesarchaeoidea) there are separate places for insemination and oviposition, both on the same sterna as the monotrysian type, i.e. 9 and 10. The ditrysian groups have an internal duct that carries sperm, with separate openings for copulation and egg-laying. In most species, the genitalia are flanked by two soft lobes, although they may be specialized and sclerotized in some species for ovipositing in areas such as crevices and inside plant tissue. The glands that produce hormones drive development as the insects go through their life cycles. The first insect hormone prothoracicotropic hormone (PTTH) operates the species life cycle and diapause. It is produced by corpora allata and corpora cardiaca, where it is stored.

=== Digestive system ===
In the digestive system, the front of the foregut is modified to form a pharyngeal sucking pump for feeding on liquids such as nectar. The esophagus leads to the posterior of the pharynx and in some species forms a form of crop. The midgut is short and straight, while the hindgut is longer and coiled. Ancestral lepidopterans, stemming from Hymenoptera, had midgut ceca, not present in current butterflies and moths. Instead, digestive enzymes, other than initial digestion, are immobilized at the surface of the midgut cells. In larvae, long-necked and stalked goblet cells are found in the anterior and posterior midgut regions, respectively. The goblet cells excrete positive potassium ions, absorbed from leaves ingested by the larvae. Most lepidopterans display the usual digestive cycle, sometimes adapted for specialised diets. Some, like the luna moth, exhibit no digestive system whatsoever; they survive as adults from stored energy consumed as larvae and live for no longer than 7–10 days.

Internal morphology of adult male in the family Nymphalidae, showing most of the major organ systems, with characteristic reduced forelegs of that family: The corpora include the corpus allatum and the corpus cardiaca.

=== Circulatory system ===
The circulatory system uses hemolymph, insect blood, for thermoregulation, taking heat from the muscles and transferring it to the rest of the body. In lepidopteran species, hemolymph is circulated through the veins in the wings by some form of pulsating organ, either by the heart or by the intake of air into the trachea.

=== Respiratory system ===
The respiratory system takes in air through spiracles along the sides of the abdomen and thorax, supplying the tracheae with oxygen. Three different tracheae supply and diffuse oxygen throughout the species' bodies. The dorsal tracheae supply oxygen to the dorsal musculature and vessels, while the ventral tracheae supply the ventral musculature and nerve cord, and the visceral tracheae supply the guts, fat bodies, and gonads.

== Polymorphism ==
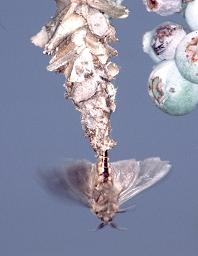
Sexually dimorphic bagworm moths (Thyridopteryx ephemeraeformis) mating: The female is flightless.

Polymorphism is the appearance of forms or morphs which differ in color and other attributes within a species. In Lepidoptera, polymorphism can be seen both between individuals and between the sexes as sexual dimorphism, between geographically separated populations, and between generations flying at different seasons of the year (seasonal polymorphism or polyphenism). Polymorphism can be limited to one sex, typically the female.

Environmental polymorphism, in which traits are not inherited, is often termed polyphenism, commonly seen in seasonal morphs, especially in the butterfly families of Nymphalidae and Pieridae. An Old World pierid butterfly, the common grass yellow (Eurema hecabe) has a darker summer adult morph, triggered by a day of over 13 hours, while a shorter day induces a paler morph after the monsoon. Polyphenism also occurs in caterpillars, as in the peppered moth, Biston betularia.

Geographical isolation causes a divergence of a species into different morphs. A good example is the Indian white admiral Limenitis procris, which has five forms, each geographically separated from the other by large mountain ranges. A more dramatic showcase of geographical polymorphism is the Apollo butterfly (Parnassius apollo). Because the Apollos live in small local populations, with no contact with each other, interbreeding between populations practically never occurs. They therefore form over 600 different morphs, with the size of spots on the wings varying greatly.

Seasonal diphenism in the common grass yellow, Eurema hecabe

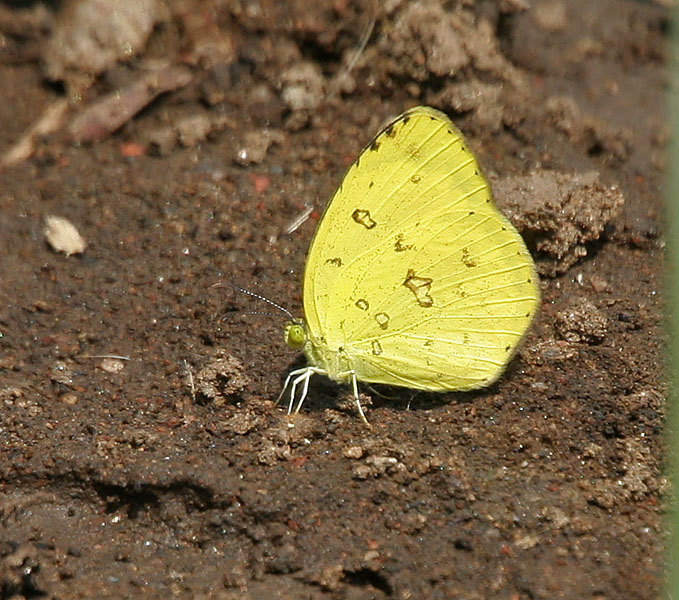
Dry-season form

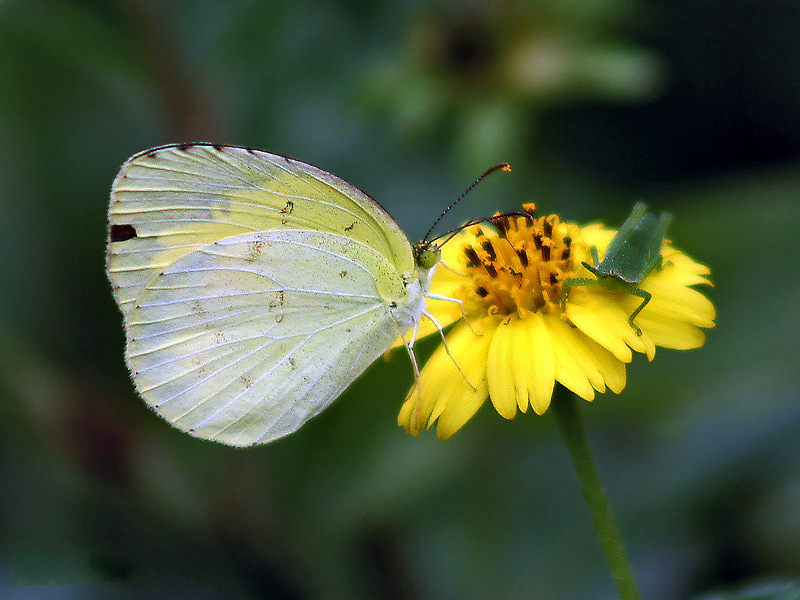
Wet-season form

Sexual dimorphism is the occurrence of differences between males and females. In Lepidoptera, it is widespread and almost completely set genetically. It is present in all families of the Papilionoidea and more prominent in the Lycaenidae, Pieridae, and some of the Nymphalidae. Apart from color variation, secondary sexual characteristics may be present. Different genotypes may be expressed at the same time. Polymorphic and/or mimetic females occur in some taxa in the Papilionidae to obtain a level of protection not available to the male of their species. The most distinct case of sexual dimorphism is that of adult females of many Psychidae which have only vestigial wings, legs, and mouthparts, whereas the adult males that are strong fliers with well-developed wings and feathery antennae.

== Reproduction and development ==
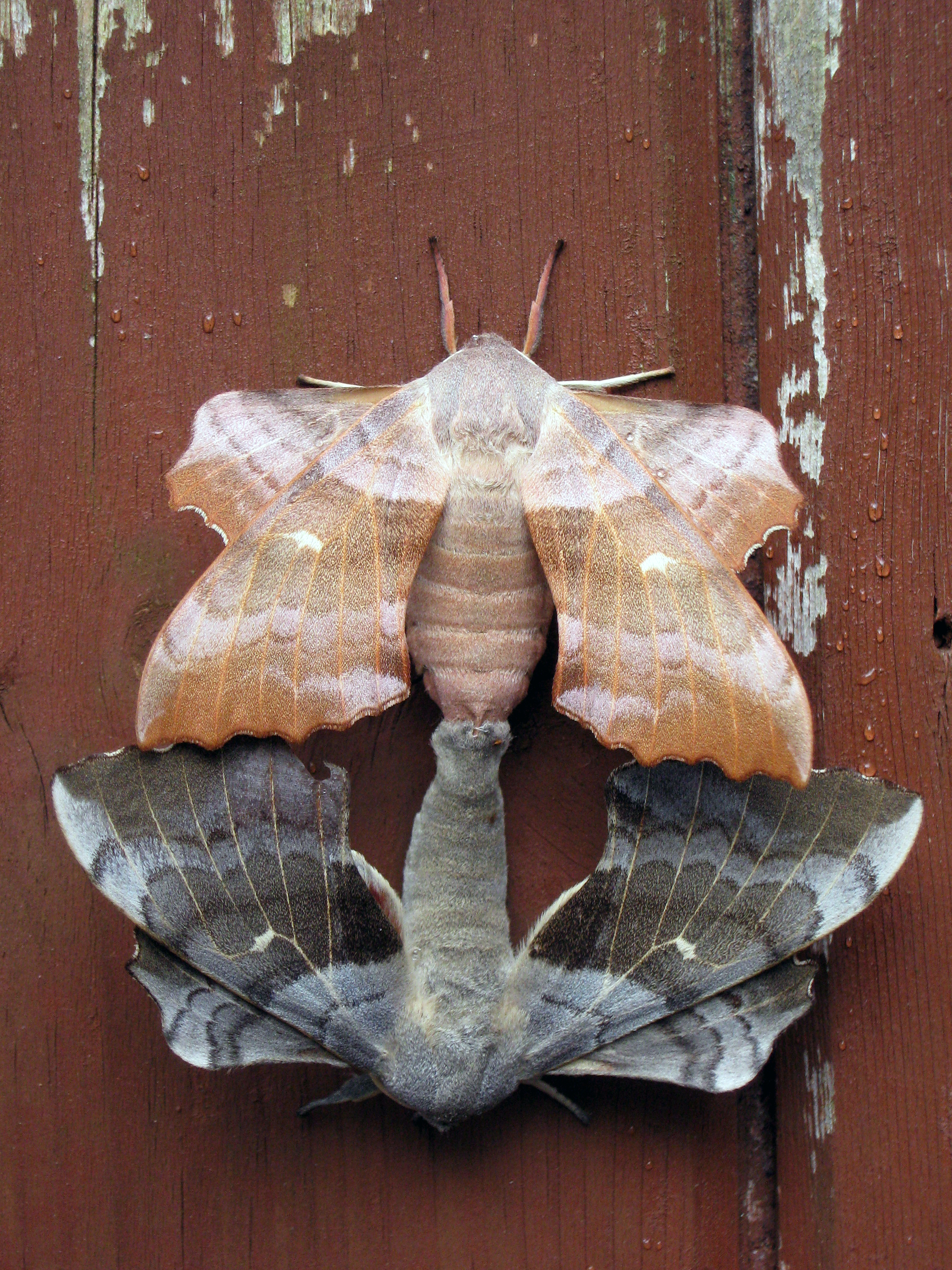
Mating pair of Laothoe populi (poplar hawk-moth) showing two different color variants

Species of Lepidoptera undergo holometabolism or "complete metamorphosis". Their life cycle normally consists of an egg, a larva, a pupa, and an imago or adult. The polypod larvae are commonly called caterpillars; the pupae of moths encapsulated in silk are called cocoons, while the uncovered pupa of butterflies is called a chrysalis (plural: chrysalides).

=== Mating ===
Males usually start eclosion (emergence) earlier than females and peak in numbers before females. Both of the sexes are sexually mature by the time of eclosion. Butterflies and moths are relatively asocial, except for migrating species. Mating begins with an adult attracting a mate, normally using visual stimuli, especially in diurnal species like most butterflies. However, the females of most nocturnal species, including almost all moth species, use pheromones to attract males, sometimes from long distances. Some species attract mates using sound, as in the polka-dot wasp moth, Syntomeida epilais.

Adaptations include having one, two or several seasonal generations, called voltinism. Most lepidopterans in temperate climates are univoltine, while in tropical climates most have two seasonal broods. Others may mate at any time of year. These adaptations are controlled by hormones, with delays in reproduction called diapause. Many species die soon after mating and laying their eggs, having only lived for a few days after eclosion. Others may still be active for several weeks, overwinter in diapause, and become active again when the weather becomes more favorable.

=== Life cycle ===
The four stages of the life cycle of an anise swallowtail

==== Eggs ====
Lepidoptera usually reproduce sexually and are oviparous (egg-laying), though some give birth to live young (ovoviviparity). Some species with larvae that can eat a variety of plants simply drop their eggs in flight, as in hepialids. Most lay their eggs near or on the host, the plant on which the larvae feed. The number of eggs laid varies from a few to several thousand. The females select the host plant instinctively, primarily by chemical cues.

The eggs are derived from materials ingested as a larva and in some species, from the spermatophores received from males during mating. An egg can only be 1/1000 the mass of the female, yet she may lay up to her own mass in eggs. Females lay smaller eggs as they age. Larger females lay larger eggs. The egg is covered by a hard-ridged protective outer layer of shell, called the chorion. It is lined with a thin coating of wax, which prevents the egg from drying out. Each egg has micropyles, tiny funnel-shaped openings at one end, to allow sperm to enter and fertilize the egg. Butterfly and moth eggs vary greatly in size between species, but they are all either spherical or ovate.

The egg stage lasts a few weeks in most butterflies, but eggs laid prior to winter, especially in temperate regions, go through diapause and hatching is delayed until spring. Other temperate region butterflies lay their eggs in the spring and have them hatch in the summer (e. g. Nymphalis antiopa).

==== Larvae ====
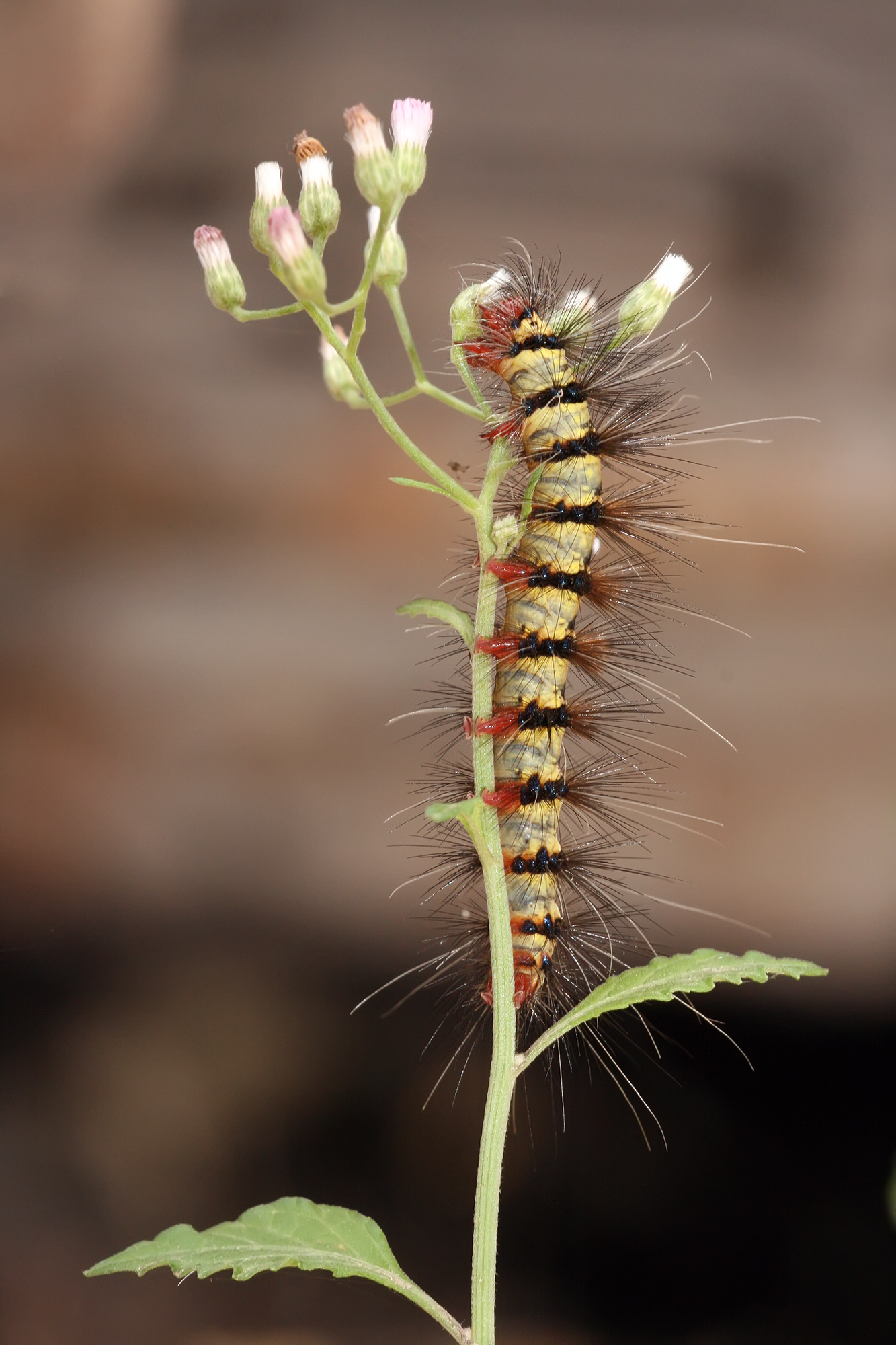
Lepidopteran larvae typically live and feed on plants.

The larvae or caterpillars are the first stage in the life cycle after hatching. Caterpillars are "characteristic polypod larvae with cylindrical bodies, short thoracic legs, and abdominal prolegs (pseudopods)". They have a sclerotized head capsule, mandibles (mouthparts) for chewing, and a soft tubular body. The body has three pairs of true legs, and up to five pairs of prolegs; there may be hairs or other projections. The body consists of thirteen segments, of which three are thoracic and ten are abdominal. Most larvae are herbivores, but a few are carnivores or detritivores.

Different herbivorous species have adapted to feed on every part of the plant and are normally considered pests to their host plants; some species lay their eggs on fruit, others on clothing or fur (e. g., Tineola bisselliella, the clothes moth). Some are carnivorous, and others are parasitic. Some lycaenid species such as Phengaris rebeli are social parasites of Myrmica ant nests. A species of Geometridae from Hawaii has carnivorous larvae that catch and eat flies. Some pyralid caterpillars are aquatic. The larvae develop rapidly with several generations in a year; however, some species may take up to 3 years to develop, and exceptional examples like Gynaephora groenlandica take as long as seven years.

The larvae of some butterflies and moths use mimicry to deter predators. Some caterpillars can inflate parts of their heads to appear snake-like. Many have false eye-spots to enhance this effect. Some have structures called osmeteria (family Papilionidae), exposed to produce foul-smelling defensive chemicals. Host plants often contain toxic substances; caterpillars can sequester and retain these into the adult stage. This helps make them unpalatable to birds and other predators. Such unpalatability is advertised using bright red, orange, black, or white warning colors. The toxic chemicals in plants are often evolved specifically to protect them from being eaten by insects. Insects, in turn, develop countermeasures or make use of these toxins for their own survival. This "arms race" has led to the coevolution of insects and their host plants.

==== Wing development ====
No form of wing is externally visible on the larva, but when larvae are dissected, developing wings can be seen as disks, which can be found on the second and third thoracic segments, in place of the spiracles that are apparent on abdominal segments. Wing disks develop in association with a trachea that runs along the base of the wing, and are surrounded by a thin peripodial membrane, which is linked to the outer epidermis of the larva by a tiny duct. Wing disks are very small until the last larval instar, when they increase dramatically in size, are invaded by branching tracheae from the wing base that precede the formation of the wing veins and begin to develop patterns associated with several landmarks of the wing.

Near pupation, the wings are forced outside the epidermis under pressure from the hemolymph, and although they are initially quite flexible and fragile, by the time the pupa breaks free of the larval cuticle, they have adhered tightly to the outer cuticle of the pupa (in obtect pupae). Within hours, the wings form a cuticle so hard and well-joined to the body that pupae can be picked up and handled without damage to the wings.

==== Pupa ====
Acherontia atropos emerging from pupa. Time-lapsed video

After about five to seven instars, or molts, certain hormones, like PTTH, stimulate the production of ecdysone, which initiates insect molting. The larva starts to develop into the pupa: body parts specific to the larva, such as the abdominal prolegs, degenerate, while others such as the legs and wings undergo growth. After finding a suitable place, the animal sheds its last larval cuticle, revealing the pupal cuticle underneath.

The pupa may be covered in a silk cocoon, attached to a substrate, buried, or left uncovered. Features of the adult are externally recognizable in the pupa. All the appendages on the adult head and thorax are found cased inside the cuticle (antennae, mouthparts, etc.), with the wings wrapped around, adjacent to the antennae. The pupae of some species have functional mandibles.

Aporia crataegi emerging from its chrysalis

Although the pupal cuticle is highly sclerotized, some of the lower abdominal segments are not fused, and are able to move using small muscles found in between the membrane. Moving may help the pupa, for example, escape the sun, which would otherwise kill it. The pupa of the Mexican jumping bean moth (Cydia saltitans) does this. The larvae cut a trapdoor in a bean (Sebastiania) and use it as a shelter. With a sudden rise in temperature, the pupa inside twitches and jerks, pulling on the threads inside. Wiggling may help to deter parasitoid wasps from laying eggs on the pupa. Other moths make clicks to deter predators.

The length of time before the pupa emerges varies greatly. The monarch butterfly may stay in its chrysalis for two weeks, while other may stay in diapause for more than 10 months. The adult emerges either by using abdominal hooks or from projections on the head. The mandibles of the most primitive moth families are used to escape from their cocoon (e. g., Micropterigoidea).

==== Adult ====
Most lepidopteran species do not live long after eclosion, only needing a few days to find a mate and then lay their eggs. Others may remain active for a longer period (from one to several weeks) or go through diapause and overwintering as monarch butterflies do, or waiting out environmental stress. Some adult species of microlepidoptera go through a stage where no reproductive-related activity occurs, lasting through summer and winter, followed by mating and oviposition in the early spring.

While most butterflies and moths are terrestrial, many species of Acentropinae (Crambidae) are truly aquatic with all stages except the adult occurring in water. Many species from other families such as Erebidae, Nepticulidae, Cosmopterigidae, Tortricidae, Olethreutidae, Noctuidae, Cossidae, and Sphingidae are aquatic or semiaquatic.

== Behavior ==
=== Flight ===
Flight is used for evading predators, searching for food, and finding mates. It is the main form of locomotion in most species. The forewings and hindwings are mechanically coupled and flap in synchrony. Flight is driven primarily by action of the forewings. Although lepidopteran species reportedly can still fly when their hindwings are cut off, it reduces their linear flight and turning capabilities.

Some butterflies can reach fast speeds, such as the southern dart, which can go as fast as 48.4 kilometres per hour (30.1 mph). Sphingids are some of the fastest flying insects, some are capable of flying at over 50 kilometres per hour (31 mph), having a wingspan of 35–150 millimetres (1.4–5.9 in). In some species, sometimes a gliding component to their flight exists. Flight occurs either as hovering, or as forward or backward motion. In species such as hawk moths, hovering is important as they need to maintain a certain stability over flowers when feeding on the nectar.

==== Navigation ====
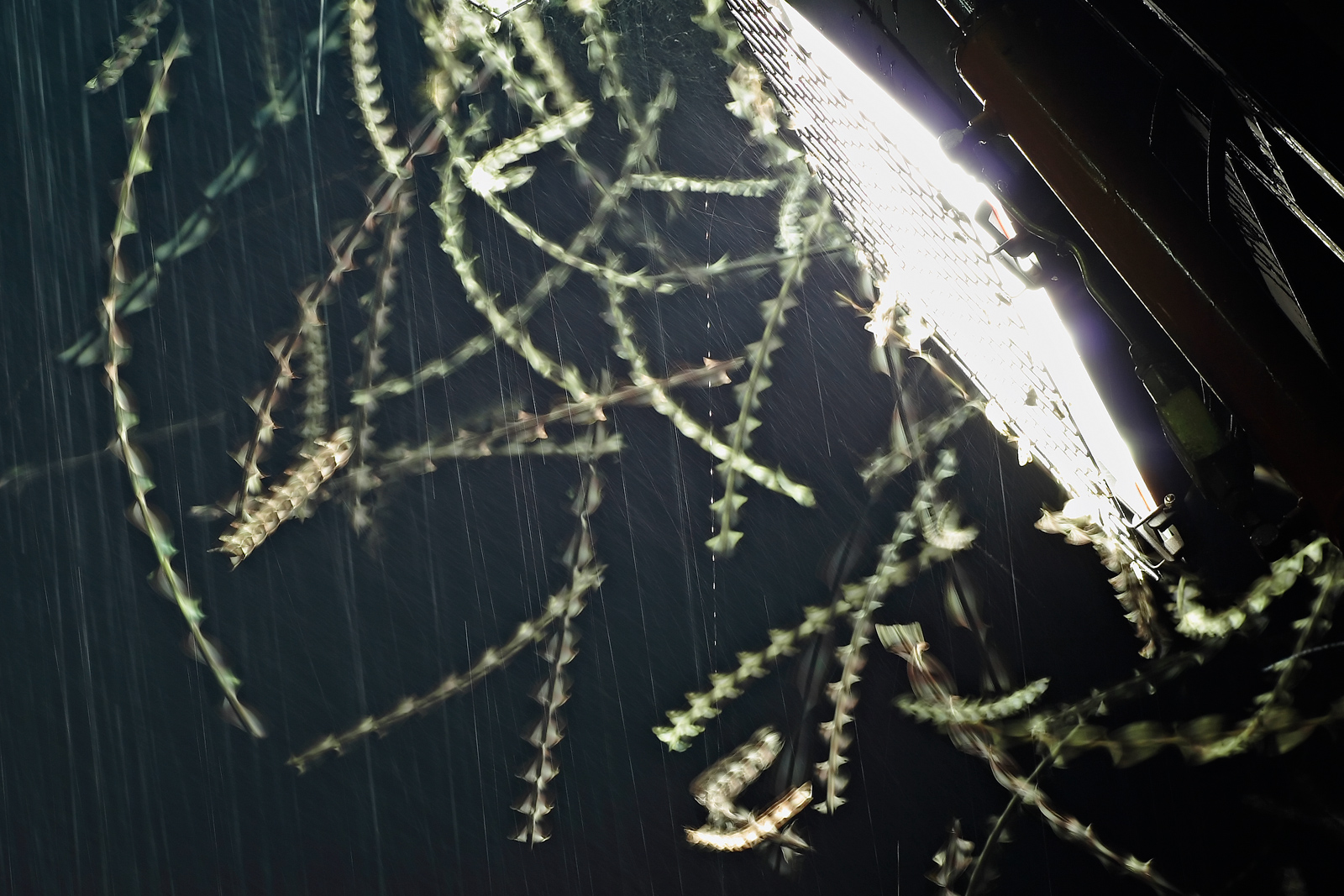
Long exposure image of flying moths, attracted to the floodlights

Navigation is important to lepidopterans, especially those that migrate. Butterflies navigate using time-compensated sun compasses. They can see polarized light, so can orient even in cloudy conditions. Most migratory butterflies live in semiarid areas where breeding seasons are short. The life histories of their host plants also influence the strategies of the butterflies. Lepidoptera may use coastal lines, mountains, and even roads to orient themselves. Above sea, the flight direction is much more accurate if the coast is still visible.

Many moths use the Earth's magnetic field to navigate. The silver Y can correct its course with changing winds, even at high altitude, and prefers flying with favourable winds. Aphrissa statira in Panama loses its navigational capacity when exposed to a magnetic field, suggesting it uses the Earth's magnetic field.

Moths tend to circle artificial lights. This suggests they use a technique of celestial navigation called transverse orientation. By maintaining a constant angular relationship to a bright celestial light, such as the Moon, they can fly in a straight line. When a moth encounters a much closer artificial light and uses it for navigation, the angle changes rapidly; the moth attempts to correct by turning toward the light, causing it to plummet downwards, and at close range, which results in a spiral flight path.

==== Migration ====
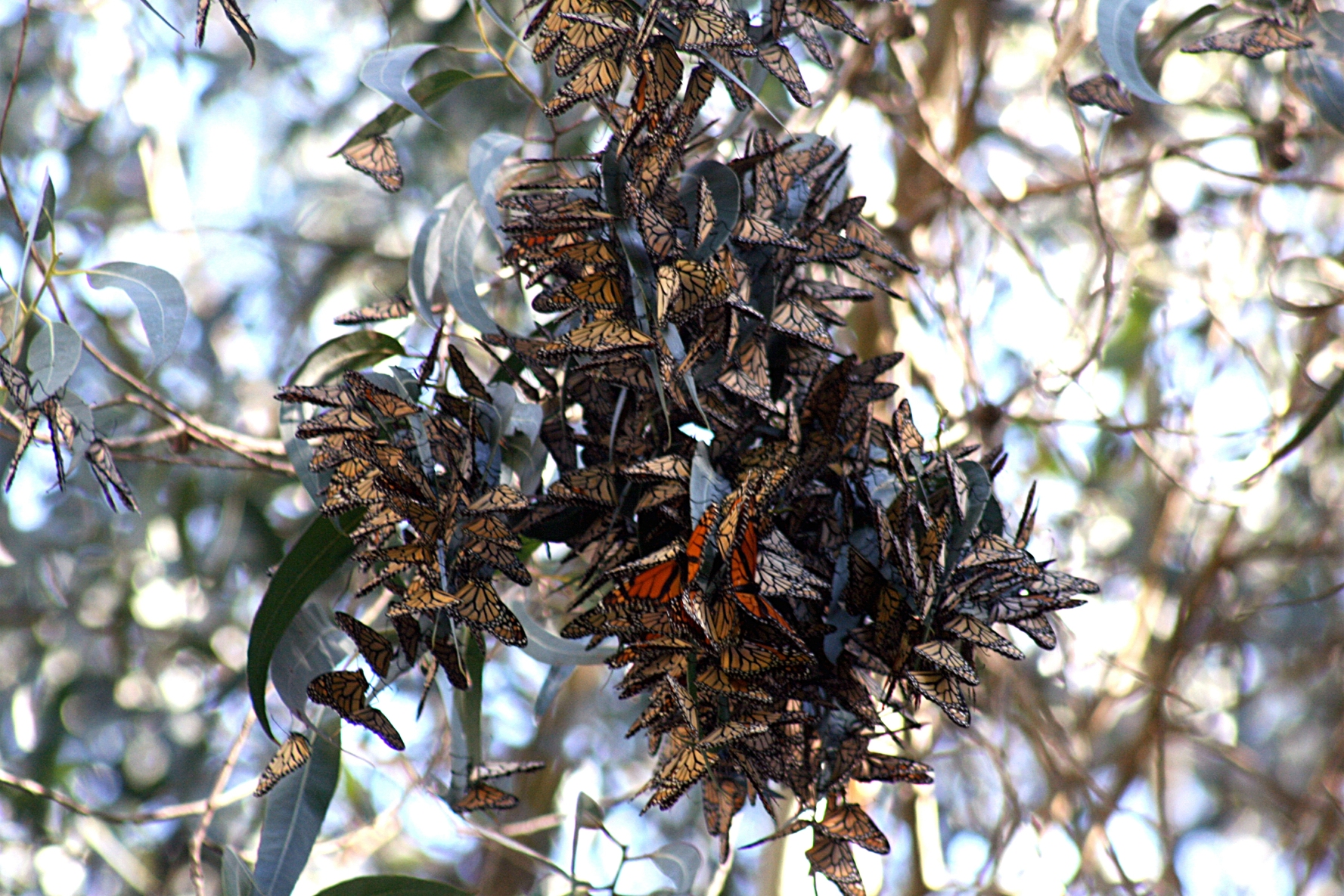
Monarch butterflies, seen in a cluster in Santa Cruz, California, where the western population migrates for the winter

Lepidopteran migration is typically seasonal, as the insects moving to escape dry seasons or other disadvantageous conditions. Most lepidopterans that migrate are butterflies, and the distance travelled varies. Some butterflies that migrate include the mourning cloak, painted lady, American lady, red admiral, and the common buckeye. A notable species of moth that migrates long distances is the bogong moth. The most well-known migrations are those of the eastern population of the monarch butterfly from Mexico to northern United States and southern Canada, a distance of about 4,000–4,800 km (2,500–3,000 mi). Other well-known migratory species include the painted lady and several of the danaine butterflies. Spectacular and large-scale migrations associated with the monsoons are seen in peninsular India. Migrations have been studied in more recent times using wing tags and stable hydrogen isotopes.

Moths such as the uraniids migrate. Urania fulgens undergoes population explosions and massive migrations that may be not surpassed by any other insect in the Neotropics. In Costa Rica and Panama, the first population movements may begin in July and early August and depending on the year, may be very massive, continuing unabated for as long as five months.

=== Communication ===
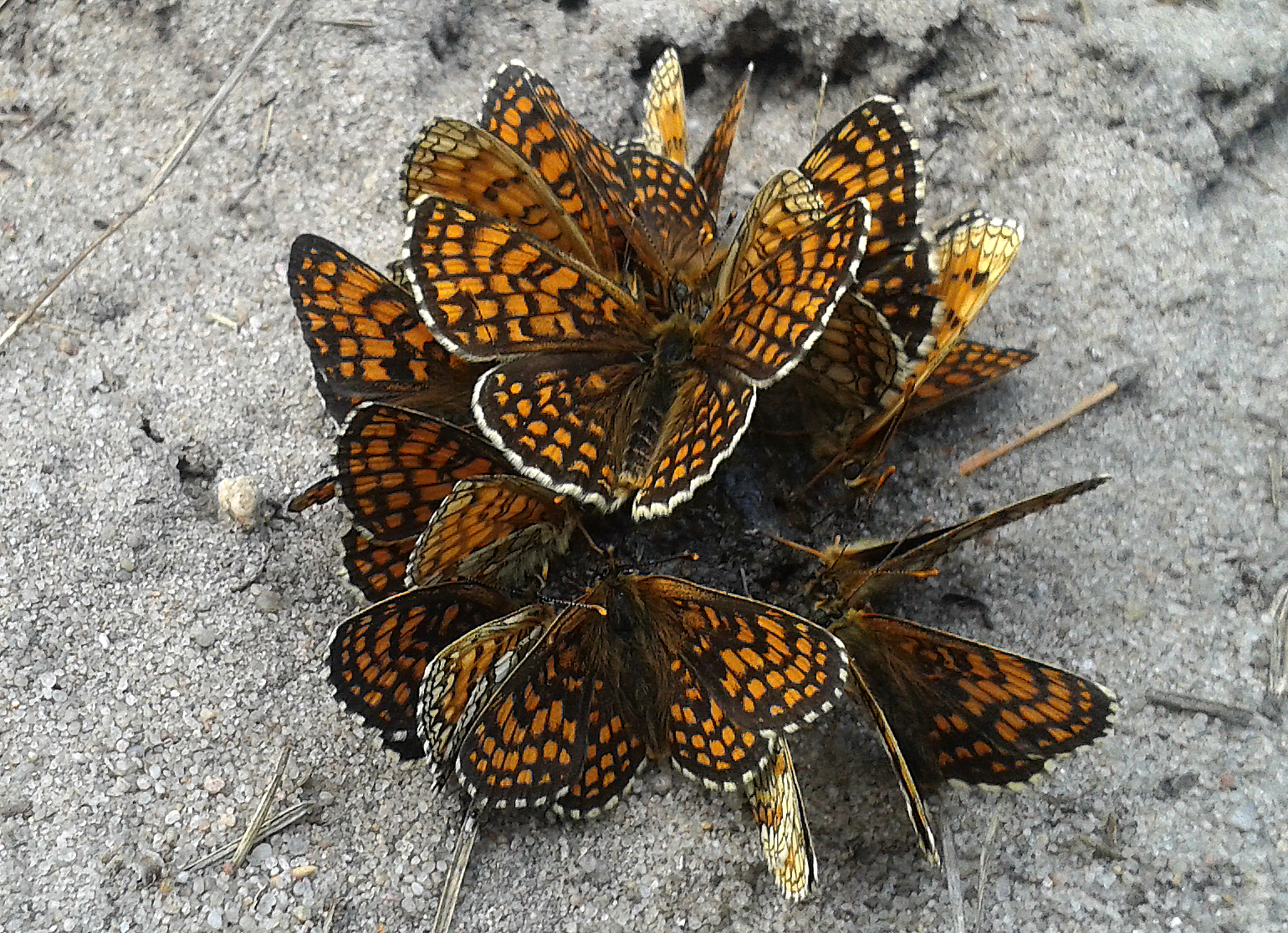
Group of Melitaea athalia near Warka, Poland

Pheromones are involved in mating rituals among species, especially moths, but they are also an important aspect of other forms of communication. Usually, the pheromones are produced by one sex and detected by members of the opposite sex with their antennae. In many species, a gland between the eighth and ninth segments under the abdomen in the female produces the pheromones. Communication can also occur through stridulation, or producing sounds by rubbing parts of the body together.

Moths engage in acoustic communication, most often as courtship, attracting mates using sound or vibration. They pick up these sounds using tympanic membranes in the abdomen. An example is that of the polka-dot wasp moth (Syntomeida epilais), which produces sounds with a frequency above that normally detectable by humans (about 20 kHz). These sounds also function as tactile communication, or communication through touch, as they stridulate, or vibrate a substrate like leaves and stems.

Most moths lack bright coloration, instead being camouflaged, but many butterflies make use of visual communication. Female cabbage butterflies, for example, use ultraviolet light to communicate, with scales colored in this range on the dorsal wing surface. When they fly, each down stroke of the wing creates a brief flash of ultraviolet light which the males apparently recognize as the flight signature of a potential mate. These flashes from the wings may attract several males that engage in aerial courtship displays.

== Ecology ==
Moth and butterfly caterpillars eat flowering plants, and are eaten by birds and parasitic insects. Adults are eaten by predators in many groups, such as birds, small mammals, and reptiles.

=== Defense and predation ===
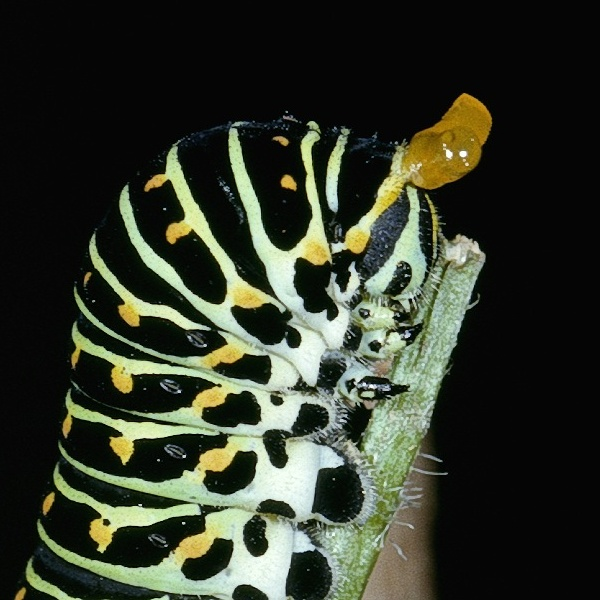
Papilio machaon caterpillar showing the osmeterium, which emits unpleasant smells to ward off predators

This Lepidoptera larvae disposes of its frass that might attract predators or parasites.

Lepidopterans are soft bodied, fragile, and almost defenseless, while the immature stages move slowly or are immobile, hence all stages are exposed to predation. Adult butterflies and moths are preyed upon by birds, bats, lizards, amphibians, dragonflies, and spiders.

An "evolutionary arms race" can be seen between predator and prey species. Strategies for defense and protection include aposematism, mimicry, camouflage, and deimatic displays.

Some species are poisonous, such as the monarch butterfly, Atrophaneura species, as well as Papilio antimachus, and the birdwings. They obtain their toxicity by sequestering chemicals from the plants they eat. Some Lepidoptera manufacture their own toxins. Predators that eat poisonous butterflies and moths may become sick and vomit violently, learning not to eat those species, and other species with similar markings. Toxic butterflies and larvae tend to develop bright colors and striking patterns to warn predators about their toxicity (aposematism). Some caterpillars, especially members of Papilionidae, contain an osmeterium, a Y-shaped protrusible gland found in the prothoracic segment of the larvae. When threatened, the caterpillar emits unpleasant smells from the organ to ward off the predators.

Camouflage is an important defense strategy. Some lepidopteran species blend with their surroundings, making them difficult to spot by predators. Caterpillars can exhibit shades of green that match its host plant. Caterpillars can detect the color of their surroundings using organs on their feet. Some caterpillars look like inedible objects, such as twigs or leaves, while those of some species, such as the common Mormon (Papilio polytes) and the western tiger swallowtail look like bird droppings. For example, adult Sesiidae species look sufficiently similar to a wasp or hornet to ward off predators. Eyespots are a type of automimicry used by some species, deflecting predators to attack these wing patterns.

Batesian and Müllerian mimicry complexes are commonly found in Lepidoptera. In Batesian mimicry, an edible species (the mimic) gains a survival advantage by resembling inedible species (the model). In Müllerian mimicry, two or more inedible species benefit by resembling each other so as to reduce the sampling rate by predators that need to learn about the insects' inedibility. Taxa from the toxic genus Heliconius form a well-known Müllerian complex.

Moths can hear ultrasound emitted by bats, which causes flying moths to make evasive maneuvers because bats are a main predator of moths; a reflex action in noctuid moths cause them to drop a few inches in flight to evade attack. Tiger moths in a defense emit clicks within the same range of the bats, which interfere with the bats and foil their attempts to echolocate it.

=== Pollination ===
A day-flying hummingbird hawk-moth drinking nectar from a species of Dianthus

Some species of Lepidoptera engage in some form of entomophily (more specifically psychophily and phalaenophily for butterflies and moths, respectively), or the pollination of flowers. Most adult butterflies and moths feed on the nectar inside flowers, using their probosces to reach the nectar hidden at the base of the petals. In the process, the adults may brush against the flowers' stamens, on which the reproductive pollen is made and stored. The pollen is transferred on appendages on the adults, which fly to the next flower to feed and unwittingly deposit the pollen on the stigma of the next flower, where the pollen germinates and fertilizes the seeds.

Flowers pollinated by butterflies tend to be large, flamboyant, and scented, as butterflies are typically day-flying. Since butterflies do not digest pollen (except for heliconid species,) more nectar is offered than pollen. The flowers have simple nectar guides, with the nectaries usually hidden in narrow tubes or spurs, reached by the long "tongue" of the butterflies. Butterflies such as Thymelicus flavus have been observed to engage in flower constancy, which means they are more likely to transfer pollen to other conspecific plants, because it reduces the loss of pollen during foraging, and the stigmas receive less pollen from other flower species. However, most butterflies are very poor pollinators despite high rates of floral visitation; for example, monarch butterflies contribute almost nothing to seed set in milkweeds that they visit for nectar.

Among the more important moth pollinator groups are the hawk moths of the family Sphingidae. Their behavior is similar to hummingbirds, i.e., using rapid wing beats to hover in front of flowers. Most hawk moths are nocturnal or crepuscular, so moth-pollinated flowers (e.g., Silene latifolia ) tend to be white, night-opening, large, and showy with tubular corollae and a strong, sweet scent produced in the evening, night, or early morning. A lot of nectar is produced to fuel the high metabolic rates needed to power their flight. Other moths (e.g., noctuids, geometrids, pyralids) fly slowly and settle on the flower. They do not require as much nectar as the fast-flying hawk moths, and the flowers tend to be small (though they may be aggregated in heads).

=== Mutualism ===
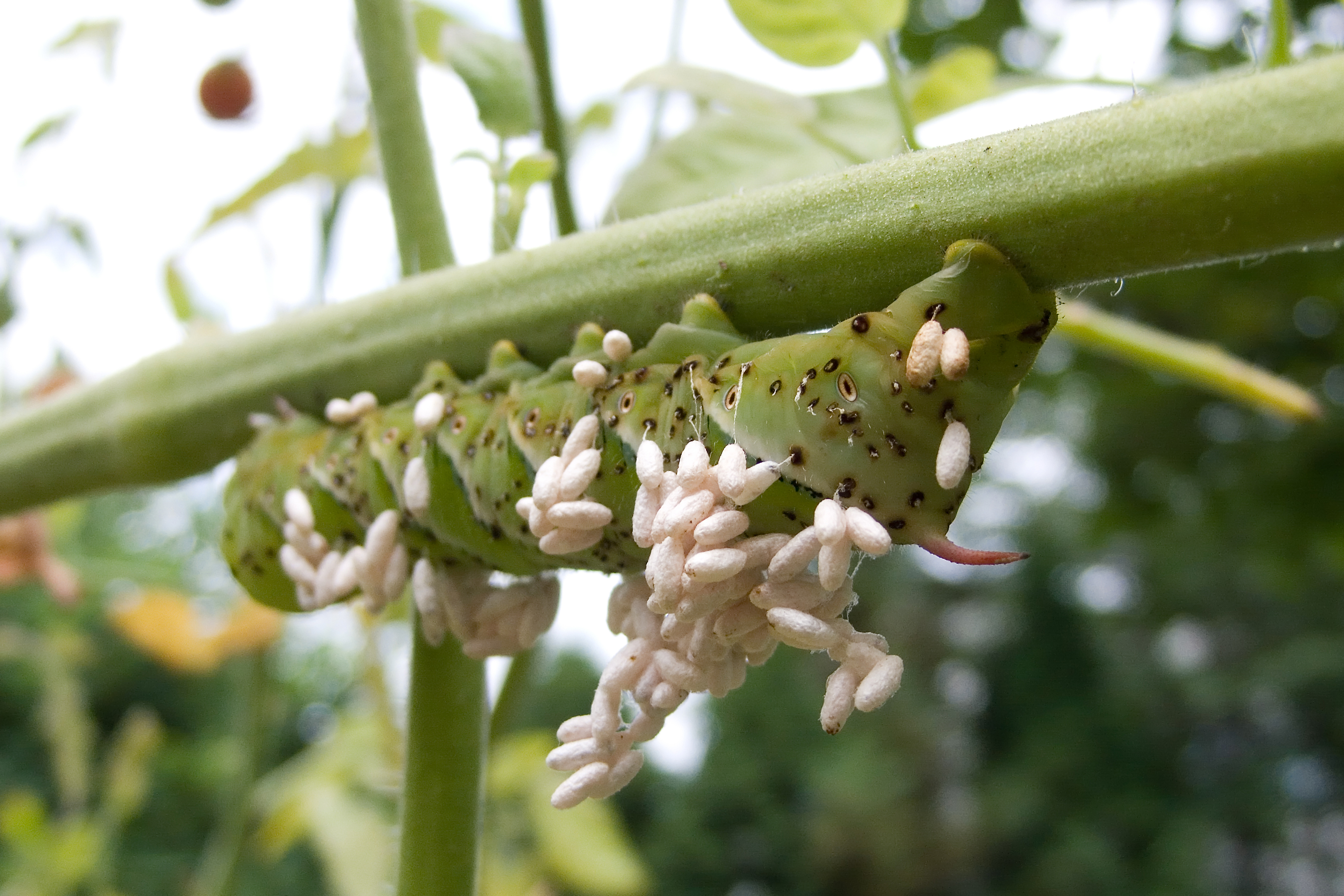
Tobacco hornworm caterpillar (Manduca sexta) parasitized by Braconidae wasp larvae

Mutualism is a form of biological interaction wherein each individual involved benefits in some way. An example of a mutualistic relationship would be that shared by yucca moths (Tegeculidae) and their host, yucca (Asparagaceae). Female yucca moths enter the flowers, collect the pollen into a ball using specialized maxillary palps, then move to the apex of the pistil, where pollen is deposited on the stigma, and lay eggs into the base of the pistil where seeds will develop. The larvae develop in the fruit pod and feed on a portion of the seeds. Thus, both insect and plant benefit, forming a highly mutualistic relationship. Another form of mutualism occurs between larvae of Lycaenid butterflies and ants. The larvae communicate with the ants using vibrations and chemical signals. The ants provide some degree of protection to these larvae and they in turn gather honeydew secretions.

=== Parasitism ===
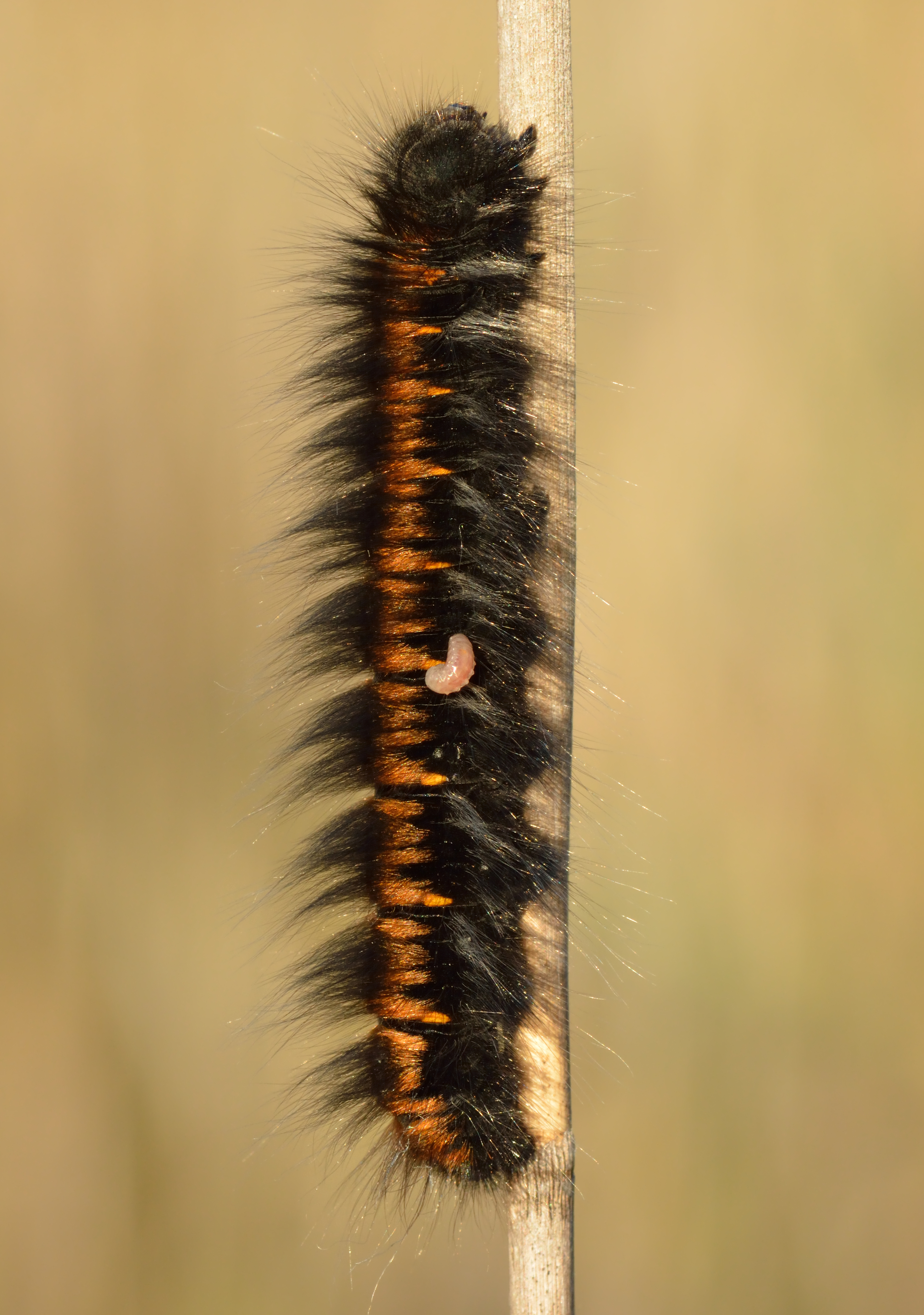
Parasitoid larva exits from a fox moth caterpillar

Only 42 species of parasitoid lepidopterans are known (1 Pyralidae; 40 Epipyropidae). The larvae of the greater and lesser wax moths feed on the honeycomb inside bee nests and may become pests; they are also found in bumblebee and wasp nests, albeit to a lesser extent. In northern Europe, the wax moth is regarded as the most serious parasitoid of the bumblebee and is found only in bumblebee nests. In some areas in southern England, as much as 80% of nests can be destroyed. Other parasitic larvae are known to prey upon cicadas and leaf hoppers.

In reverse, moths and butterflies may be subject to parasitic wasps and flies, which may lay eggs on the caterpillars, which hatch and feed inside its body, resulting in death. Although, in a form of parasitism called idiobiont, the adult paralyzes the host, so as not to kill it but for it to live as long as possible, for the parasitic larvae to benefit the most. In another form of parasitism, koinobiont, the species live off their hosts while inside (endoparasitic). These parasites live inside the host caterpillar throughout its life cycle or may affect it later on as an adult. In other orders, koinobionts include flies, a majority of coleopteran, and many hymenopteran parasitoids. Some species may be subject to a variety of parasites, such as the spongy moth (Lymantaria dispar), which is attacked by a series of 13 species, in six different taxa throughout its life cycle.

In response to a parasitoid egg or larva in the caterpillar's body, the plasmatocytes, or simply the host's cells can form a multilayered capsule that eventually causes the endoparasite to asphyxiate. The process, called encapsulation, is one of the caterpillar's only means of defense against parasitoids.

== History of study ==
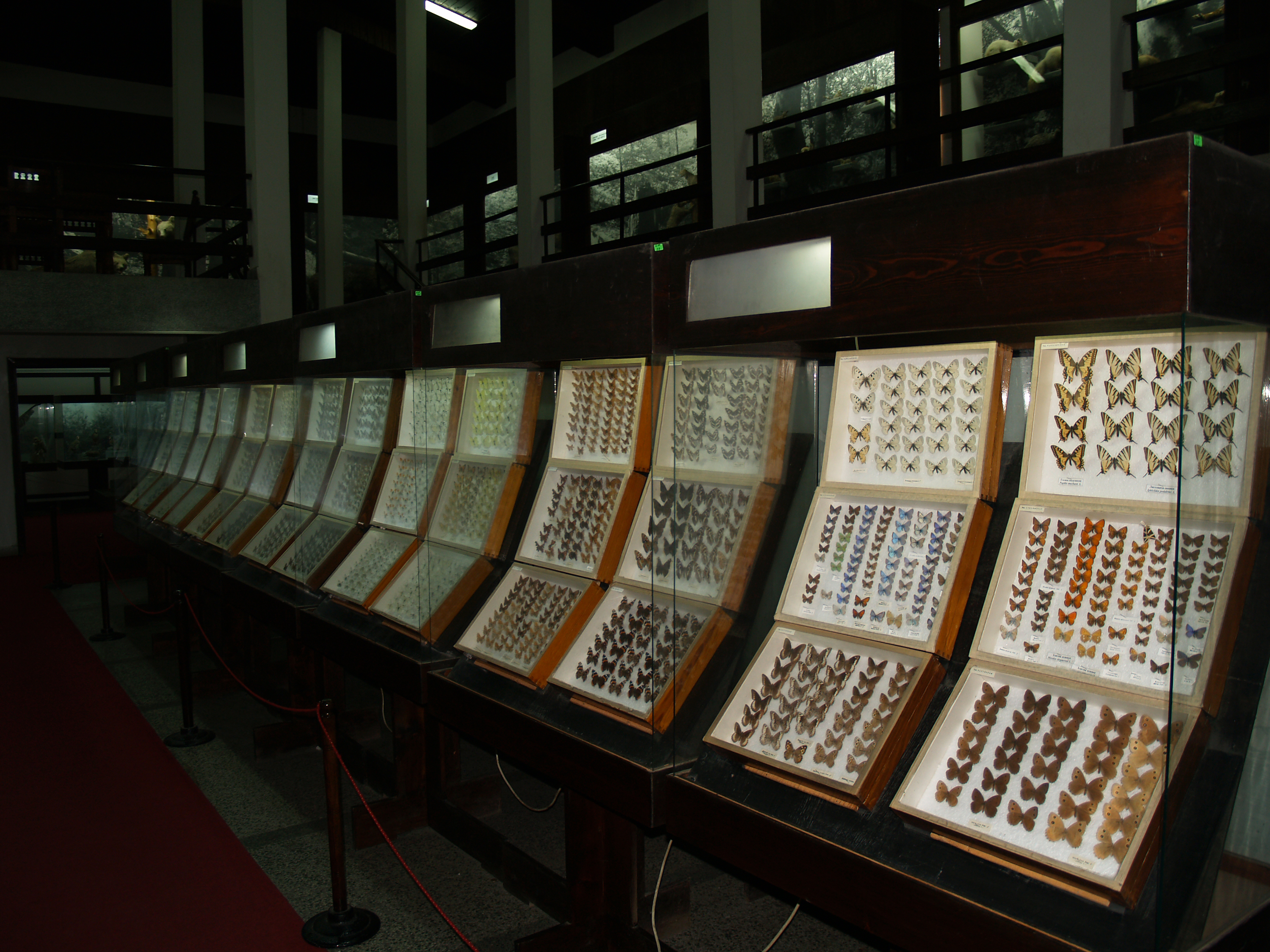
Lepidoptera collection in Cherni Osam Natural Sciences Museum, Troyan, Bulgaria

Linnaeus in Systema Naturae (1758) recognized three divisions of the Lepidoptera: Papilio, Sphinx and Phalaena, with seven subgroups in Phalaena. These persist today as 9 of the superfamilies of Lepidoptera. Other works on classification followed including those by Michael Denis & Ignaz Schiffermüller (1775), Johan Christian Fabricius (1775) and Pierre André Latreille (1796). Jacob Hübner described many genera, and the lepidopteran genera were catalogued by Ferdinand Ochsenheimer and Georg Friedrich Treitschke in a series of volumes on the lepidopteran fauna of Europe published between 1807 and 1835. Gottlieb August Wilhelm Herrich-Schäffer (several volumes, 1843–1856), and Edward Meyrick (1895) based their classifications primarily on wing venation. Sir George Francis Hampson worked on the microlepidoptera during this period and Philipp Christoph Zeller published The Natural History of the Tineinae also on microlepidoptera (1855).

Among the first entomologists to study fossil insects and their evolution was Samuel Hubbard Scudder (1837–1911), who worked on butterflies. He published a study of the Florissant deposits of Colorado, including the exceptionally preserved Prodryas persephone. Andreas V. Martynov (1879–1938) recognized the close relationship between Lepidoptera and Trichoptera in his studies on phylogeny.

Major contributions in the 20th century included the creation of the Monotrysia and Ditrysia (based on female genital structure) by Borner in 1925 and 1939. Willi Hennig (1913–1976) developed the cladistic methodology and applied it to insect phylogeny. Niels P. Kristensen, E. S. Nielsen and D. R. Davis studied the relationships among monotrysian families. Many attempts have been made to group the superfamilies of the Lepidoptera into natural groups, most of which fail because one of the two groups is not monophyletic: Microlepidoptera and Macrolepidoptera, Heterocera and Rhopalocera, Jugatae and Frenatae, Monotrysia and Ditrysia. A 2024 genetic study found that the chromosome organisation of butterflies and moths has been largely conserved in most groups over the past 250 million years.

== Evolution and systematics ==
=== Fossil record ===
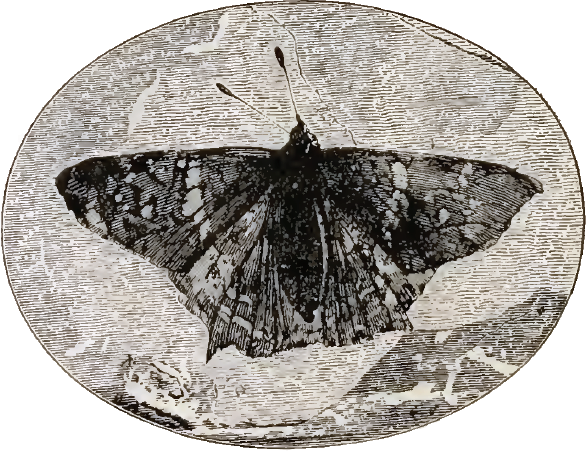
1887 engraving of Prodryas persephone, a fossil lepidopteran from the Eocene

The fossil record for Lepidoptera is lacking in comparison to other winged species and tends not to be as common as some other insects in habitats that are most conducive to fossilization, such as lakes and ponds; their juvenile stage has only the head capsule as a hard part that might be preserved. Also, the scales covering their wings are hydrophobic and prevents their body from sinking when they end up on the water's surface. Lepidopteran bodies tend to come apart after death, and decompose quickly, so fossil remains are often extremely fragmentary. Of the fossils known, only an estimated 7% have been described. The location and abundance of the most common moth species are indicative that mass migrations of moths occurred over the Palaeogene North Sea, which is why there is a serious lack of moth fossils. Yet there are fossils, some preserved in amber and some in very fine sediments. Leaf mines are also seen in fossil leaves, although the interpretation of them is tricky.

Putative fossil stem group representatives of Amphiesmenoptera (the clade comprising Trichoptera and Lepidoptera) are known from the Triassic. The earliest known probable lepidopteran fossils are fossilized scales found in approximately 236 million years old fossilized herbivore dung in Argentina that are thought to have been incidentally ingested. The next oldest fossils are from the Triassic-Jurassic boundary (ca 201 million years ago). They were found as rare palynological elements in the sediments of the Triassic-Jurassic boundary from the cored Schandelah-1 well, drilled near Braunschweig in northern Germany. This pushes back the fossil record and origin of glossatan lepidopterans by about 70-90 million years, supporting molecular estimates of a Norian (ca 212 million years) divergence of glossatan and non-glossatan lepidopterans. The findings were reported in 2018 in the journal Science Advances. The authors of the study proposed that lepidopterans evolved a proboscis as an adaptation to drink from droplets and thin films of water for maintaining their fluid balance in the hot and arid climate of the Triassic.

The earliest named lepidopteran taxon is Archaeolepis mane, a primitive moth-like species from the Early Jurassic, dated back to around 190 million years ago, and known only from three wings found in the Charmouth Mudstone of Dorset, UK. The wings show scales with parallel grooves under a scanning electron microscope and a characteristic wing venation pattern shared with Trichoptera (caddisflies). Only two more sets of Jurassic lepidopteran fossils have been found, as well as 13 sets from the Cretaceous, which all belong to primitive moth-like families.

The oldest genuine butterflies of the superfamily Papilionoidea have been found in the Paleocene MoClay or Fur Formation of Denmark. Well-preserved fossil lepidopterans include the Eocene Prodryas persephone from the Florissant Fossil Beds.

=== Phylogeny ===
Phylogenetic hypothesis of major lepidopteran lineages superimposed on the geologic time scale. Radiation of angiosperms spans 130 to 95 million years ago from their earliest forms to domination of vegetation.

Lepidoptera and Trichoptera (caddisflies) are sister groups, sharing many similarities that are lacking in others; for example the females of both orders are heterogametic, meaning they have two different sex chromosomes, whereas in most species the males are heterogametic and the females have two identical sex chromosomes. The adults in both orders display a particular wing venation pattern on their forewings. The larvae in the two orders have mouth structures and glands with which they make and manipulate silk. Willi Hennig grouped the two orders into the superorder Amphiesmenoptera; together they are sister to the extinct order Tarachoptera. Lepidoptera descend from a diurnal moth-like common ancestor that either fed on dead or living plants.

The cladogram, based on molecular analysis, shows the order as a clade, sister to the Trichoptera, and more distantly related to the Diptera (true flies) and Mecoptera (scorpionflies).

- Panorpida
  - Amphiesmenoptera
    - Lepidoptera (butterflies, moths)
    - Trichoptera (caddisflies)
  - Antliophora
    - Diptera
    - - Mecoptera (scorpionflies)
      - Siphonaptera (fleas)

The internal phylogeny of Lepidoptera is still being resolved. While many large clades have been established, interfamilial and superfamilial relationships are poorly understood. A large scale study by Regier et al. attempts to resolve these relationships using three different analysis methods, which is shown in the following cladogram.

- Lepidoptera
  - Micropterigoidea
  - - Agathiphagoidea
    - - Heterobathmioidea
      - Glossata
        - Eriocranioidea
        - Coelolepida
          - - Lophocoronoidea
            - Exoporia
              - Hepialoidea
              - Mnesarchaeoidea
          - - Neopseustoidea (incl. Acanthopteroctetidae)
            - Heteroneura
              - Nepticuloidea
              - Eulepidoptera
                - - Adeloidea
                  - Andesianoidea
                - - - Tischerioidea
                    - - Azaleodes
                      - Ptyssoptera
                  - - Palaephatus
                    - Ditrysia
                      - Meessiinae (traditionally in Tineidae)
                      - - Psychidae
                        - - Eriocottidae
                          - - Tineidae
                            - - - Roeslerstammiidae
                                - - Gracillariidae
                                  - Yponomeutoidea (incl. Bucculatricidae)
                              - Apoditrysia (cont.)

- Apoditrysia
  - Urodoidea
  - - - Choreutoidea
      - - Douglasiidae
        - Schreckensteinioidea
    - - - Immoidea
        - Millieriidae
      - - - - Tortricoidea
            - - Galacticoidea
              - Heliocosmidae
          - - Zygaenoidea
            - - Cossoidea sensu lato (including traditional Sesioidea)
              - Cyclotornidae (traditionally in Zygaenoidea)
        - Obtectomera
          - Gelechioidea
          - - - Pyraloidea
              - Macroheterocera
                - Drepanoidea (incl. Mimallonoidea)
                - - Geometroidea
                  - - Noctuoidea
                    - - Bombycoidea
                      - Lasiocampidae
            - - - Papilionoidea
                - Pterophoroidea
              - - - Pseudurgis
                  - Thyridoidea
                - - - Aluctoidea
                    - - Carposinoidea
                      - Epermenioidea
                  - - Calliduloidea
                    - - Hyblaeoidea
                      - Macropiratidae

Micropterigidae, Agathiphagidae and Heterobathmiidae are the oldest and most basal lineages of Lepidoptera. The adults of these families do not have the curled tongue or proboscis, that are found in most members of the order, but instead have chewing mandibles adapted for a special diet. Micropterigidae larvae feed on leaves, fungi, or liverworts (much like the Trichoptera). Adult Micropterigidae chew the pollen or spores of ferns. In the Agathiphagidae, larvae live inside kauri pines and feed on seeds. In Heterobathmiidae the larvae feed on the leaves of Nothofagus, the southern beech tree. These families also have mandibles in the pupal stage, which help the pupa emerge from the seed or cocoon after metamorphosis.

With the evolution of the Ditrysia in the mid-Cretaceous, there was a major reproductive change. The Ditrysia, which comprise 98% of the Lepidoptera, have two separate openings for reproduction in the females (as well as a third opening for excretion), one for mating, and one for laying eggs. The two are linked internally by a seminal duct. (In more basal lineages there is one cloaca, or later, two openings and an external sperm canal.) Of the early lineages of Ditrysia, Gracillarioidea and Gelechioidea are mostly leaf miners, but more recent lineages feed externally. In the Tineoidea, most species feed on plant and animal detritus and fungi, and build shelters in the larval stage.

In the so-called "macrolepidoptera", which constitutes about 60% of lepidopteran species, there was a general increase in size, better flying ability (via changes in wing shape and linkage of the forewings and hindwings), reduction in the adult mandibles, and a change in the arrangement of the crochets (hooks) on the larval prolegs, perhaps to improve the grip on the host plant. Many have tympanal organs, that allow them to hear. The main lineages in the macrolepidoptera are the Noctuoidea, Bombycoidea, Lasiocampidae, Mimallonoidea, Geometroidea and Rhopalocera. Bombycoidea plus Lasiocampidae plus Mimallonoidea may be a monophyletic group. The Rhopalocera, comprising the Papilionoidea (butterflies), Hesperioidea (skippers), and the Hedyloidea (moth-butterflies), are the most recently evolved. There is quite a good fossil record for this group, with the oldest skipper dating from 56 million years ago.

=== Taxonomy ===
There are over 120 recognized lepidopteran families, in 45 to 48 superfamilies. Historically, lepidopterists classified the order into five suborders, with one encompassing the so-called "primitive" moths—groups that were long viewed as relics, retaining morphological features reminiscent of their distant ancestors. This portrayed these lineages as static holdovers from the past. In contrast, the vast majority of species fall within the dominant suborder Ditrysia, characterized by "advanced" reproductive and morphological traits. Phylogenetic analyses show that these early-diverging lineages are paraphyletic relative to later lineages. Consequently, lepidopterists have largely abandoned intermediate clades such as suborders.

The basal clades of Lepidoptera represent early-diverging lineages that retain ancestral traits, providing key insights into the order's evolutionary origins. These groups are paraphyletic and form successive sister relationships leading to the dominant Glossata. Below is an overview of the major clades:

Zeugloptera
This clade comprises the single superfamily Micropterigoidea, one of the earliest-diverging lineages, with adults uniquely retaining functional chewing mouthparts (mandibles). Approximately 120 species are known worldwide.

Aglossata
This clade contains a single small family, Agathiphagidae. These moths lack a functional proboscis, reflecting their early divergence, and their caterpillars feed exclusively on the wood of kauri trees (genus Agathis).

Heterobathmiina
This clade includes the single family Heterobathmiidae, with around 10 species of day-flying, metallic moths restricted to southern South America. Adults feed on pollen from Nothofagus (southern beech) trees, while the larvae mine leaves. They lack a functional proboscis.

Glossata
Encompassing most lepidopteran species, this clade is distinguished by the loss of functional mandibles and the development of elongated maxillary galeae forming a proboscis for liquid feeding.

== Relationship to people ==
=== Culture ===
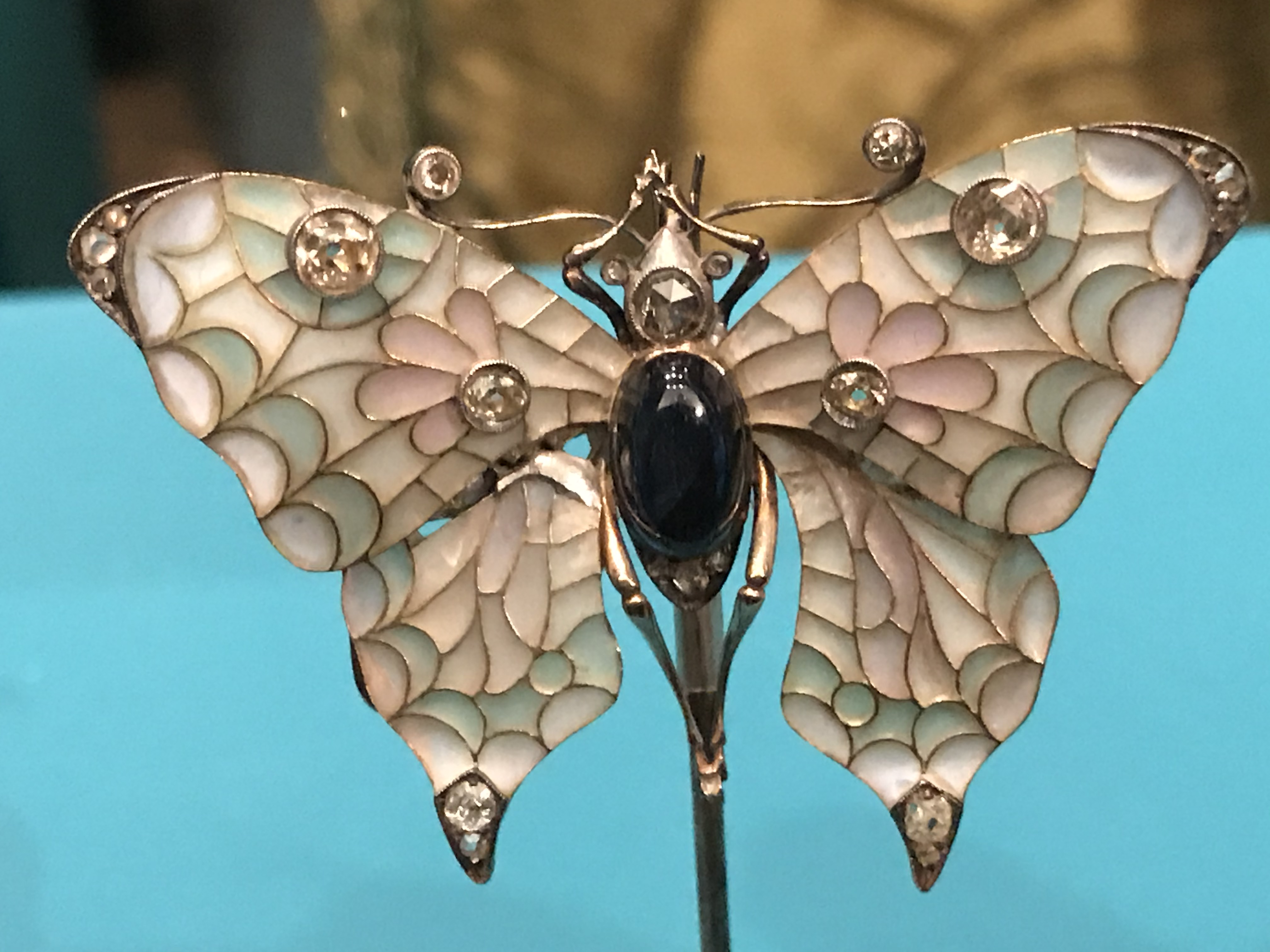
Butterfly brooch from the Russian court in gold, silver, diamond, and sapphire. 19th century

Artistic depictions of butterflies have been used in cultures from at least 3500 years ago, in Egyptian hieroglyphs. Butterflies are widely used in various objects of art and jewelry: mounted in frames, embedded in resin, displayed in bottles, laminated in paper, and in some mixed media artworks and furnishings.

In many cultures the soul of a dead person is associated with the butterfly, for example in Ancient Greece, where the word for butterfly ψυχή (psyche) also means soul and breath. In Latin, as in Ancient Greece, the word for "butterfly" papilio was associated with the soul of the dead. According to Kwaidan: Stories and Studies of Strange Things, by Lafcadio Hearn, a butterfly was seen in Japan as the personification of a person's soul; whether they were living, dying, or already dead. A Japanese superstition says that if a butterfly enters your guestroom and perches behind the bamboo screen, the person whom you most love is coming to see you. However, large numbers of butterflies are viewed as a bad omen. When Taira no Masakado was secretly preparing for his famous revolt, there appeared in Kyoto so vast a swarm of butterflies that the people were frightened—thinking the apparition to be a portent of coming evil. In Nara, one of the Extermination of Evil scrolls depicts a silkworm moth deity called Shinchū (神虫), or divine insect, consuming evil spirits.

In the ancient Mesoamerican city of Teotihuacan, the brilliantly colored image of the butterfly was carved into temples, buildings, jewelry, and incense burners. The butterfly was sometimes depicted with the maw of a jaguar; some species were considered to be the reincarnations of the souls of dead warriors. The close association of butterflies to fire and warfare persisted through to the Aztec civilization; jaguar-butterfly images have been found among the Zapotec and Maya civilizations. The name of the Aztec deity Ītzpāpālōtl means either "obsidian butterfly" or "clawed butterfly" in Nahuatl and is associated with the Orizaba silkmoth.

=== Pests ===
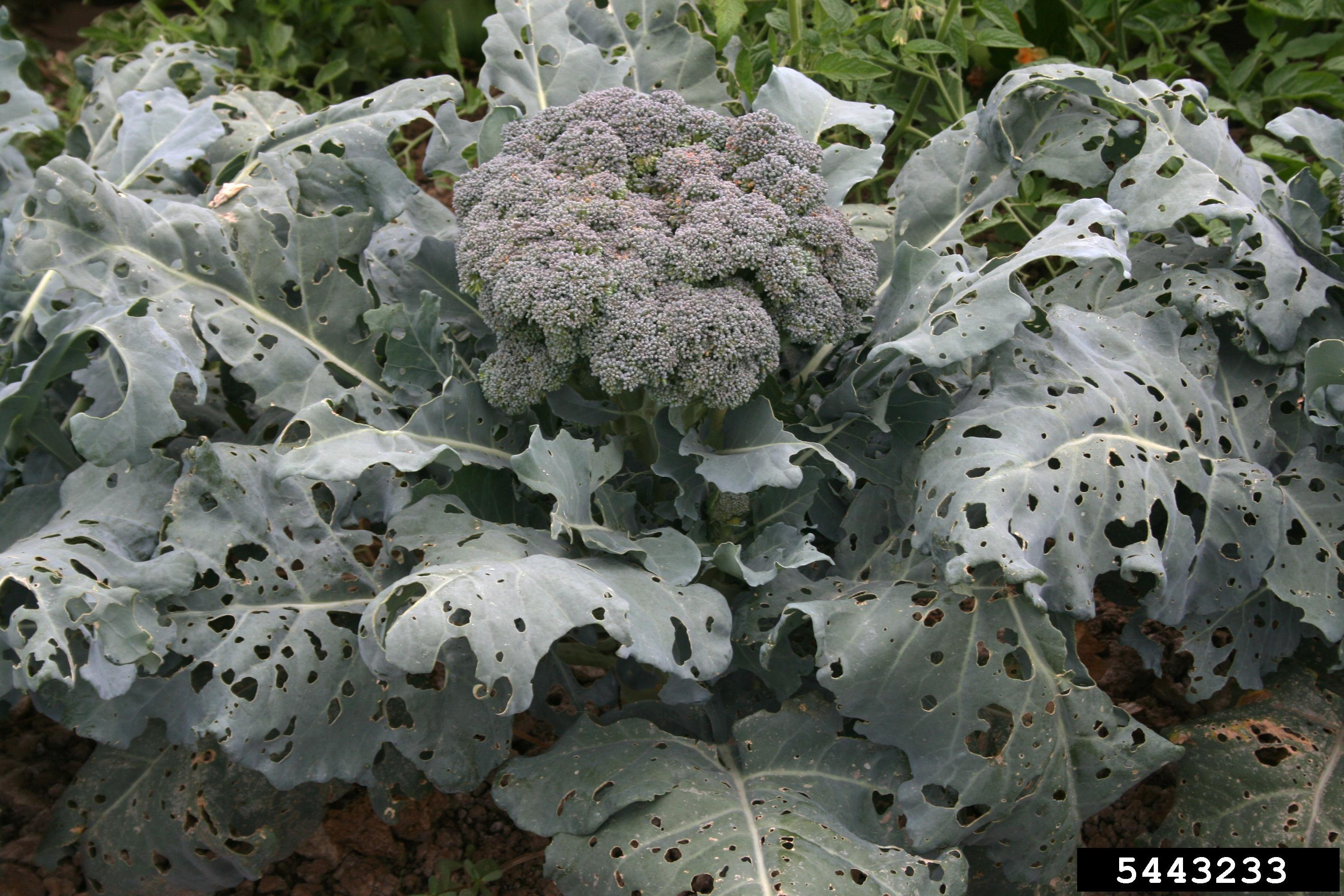
Pieris rapae caterpillar damage to a broccoli (Brassicaceae)

The larvae of many lepidopteran species are major pests in agriculture. Some of the major pests include Tortricidae, Noctuidae, and Pyralidae. The larvae of the Noctuidae genus Spodoptera (armyworms), Helicoverpa (corn earworm), or Pieris brassicae can cause extensive damage to certain crops. Helicoverpa zea larvae (cotton bollworms or tomato fruitworms) are polyphagous, meaning they eat a variety of crops, including tomatoes and cotton. Peridroma saucia (variegated cutworms) are described as one of the most damaging pests to gardens, with the ability to destroy entire gardens and fields in a matter of days.

Butterflies and moths are one of the largest taxa to solely feed and be dependent on living plants, in terms of the number of species, and they are in many ecosystems, making up the largest biomass to do so. In many species, the female may produce anywhere from 200 to 600 eggs, while in some others it may go as high as 30,000 eggs in one day. This can create many problems for agriculture, where many caterpillars can affect acres of vegetation. Some reports estimate that there have been over 80,000 caterpillars of several different taxa feeding on a single oak tree. In some cases, phytophagous larvae can lead to the destruction of entire trees in relatively short periods of time.

Ecological ways of removing pest Lepidoptera species are becoming more economically viable, as research has shown ways like introducing parasitic wasps and flies. For example, Sarcophaga aldrichi, a fly which deposited larvae feed upon the pupae of the forest tent caterpillar moth. Pesticides can affect other species other than the species they are targeted to eliminate, damaging the natural ecosystem. Another good biological pest control method is the use of pheromone traps. A pheromone trap is a type of insect trap that uses pheromones to lure insects. Sex pheromones and aggregating pheromones are the most common types used. A pheromone-impregnated lure is encased in a conventional trap such as a Delta trap, water-pan trap, or funnel trap.

Species of moths that are detritivores would naturally eat detritus containing keratin, such as hairs or feathers. Well known species are cloth moths (T. bisselliella, T. pellionella, and T. tapetzella), feeding on foodstuffs that people find economically important, such as cotton, linen, silk and wool fabrics as well as furs; furthermore they have been found on shed feathers and hair, bran, semolina and flour (possibly preferring wheat flour), biscuits, casein, books, taxidermy, and insect specimens in museums.

=== Beneficial insects ===
Even though some butterflies and moths affect the economy negatively, many species are a valuable economic resource. The most prominent example is that of the domesticated silkworm moth (Bombyx mori), the larvae of which make their cocoons out of silk, which can be spun into cloth. Silk is and has been an important economic resource throughout history. The species Bombyx mori has been domesticated to the point where it is completely dependent on mankind for survival. A number of wild moths such as Bombyx mandarina, and Antheraea species, besides others, provide commercially important silks.

The preference of the larvae of most lepidopteran species to feed on a single species or limited range of plants is used as a mechanism for biological control of weeds in place of herbicides. The pyralid cactus moth was introduced from Argentina to Australia, where it successfully suppressed millions of acres of prickly pear cactus. Another species of the Pyralidae, called the alligator weed stem borer (Arcola malloi), was used to control the aquatic plant known as alligator weed (Alternanthera philoxeroides) in conjunction with the alligator weed flea beetle; in this case, the two insects work in synergy and the weed rarely recovers.

Breeding butterflies and moths, or butterfly gardening/rearing, has become an ecologically viable process of introducing species into the ecosystem to benefit it. Butterfly ranching in Papua New Guinea permits nationals of that country to "farm" economically valuable insect species for the collectors market in an ecologically sustainable manner.

=== Food ===
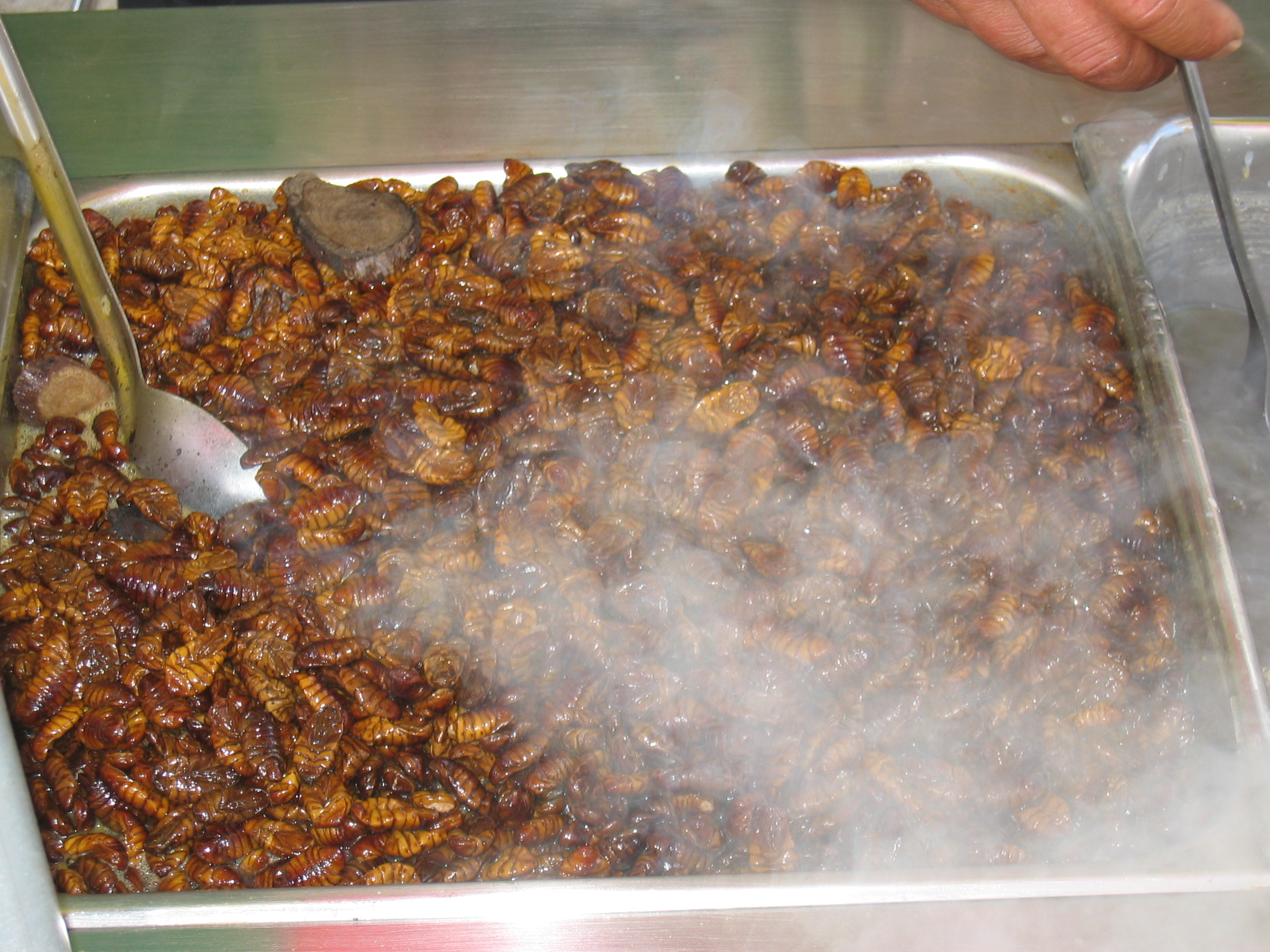
Beondegi, silkworm pupae steamed or boiled and seasoned for taste, for sale by a street vendor in South Korea

Lepidoptera feature prominently in entomophagy as food items on almost every continent. While in most cases, adults, larvae or pupae are eaten as staples by indigenous people, beondegi or silkworm pupae are eaten as a snack in Korean cuisine while Maguey worm is considered a delicacy in Mexico. In some parts of Huasteca, the silk nests of the Madrone butterfly are maintained on the edge of roof tops of houses for consumption. In the Carnia region of Italy, children catch and eat ingluvies of the toxic Zygaena moths in early summer. The ingluvies, despite having a very low cyanogenic content, serve as a convenient, supplementary source of sugar to the children who can include this resource as a seasonal delicacy at minimum risk. Outside of this instance, adult Lepidoptera are rarely consumed by humans, with the sole exception of the Bogong moth.

=== Health ===
Some larvae of both moths and butterflies have irritant toxic hairs; species from some 12 families can inflict serious human injuries (urticarial dermatitis and atopic asthma to osteochondritis, consumption coagulopathy, renal failure, and intracerebral hemorrhage). Skin rashes are the most common, but there have been fatalities. Lonomia is a frequent cause of envenomation in humans in Brazil, killing up to 20% of people affected.

== See also ==
- Lepidoptera in the 10th edition of Systema Naturae
- McGuire Center for Lepidoptera and Biodiversity, University of Florida
- Societas Europaea Lepidopterologica
- Lists of Lepidoptera by region
- Taxonomy of the Lepidoptera
- Butterfly Conservation
