= Taxonomy of the Lepidoptera =

Classification of moths and butterflies

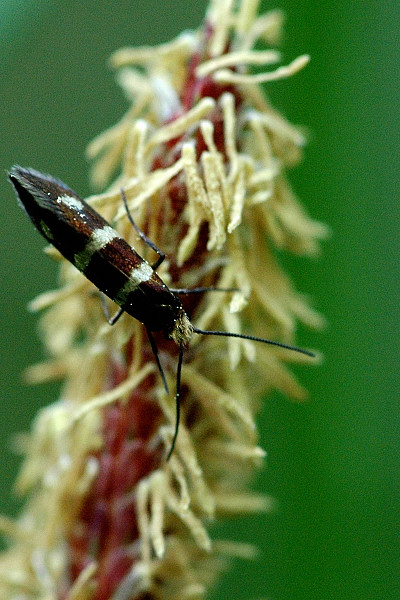
Micropterix aureatella, a micropterigid moth

The insect order Lepidoptera consists of moths and butterflies (43 superfamilies). Most moths are night-flying, while the butterflies (superfamily Papilionoidea) are mainly day-flying. Within Lepidoptera as a whole, the groups listed below before Glossata contain a few small families accounting for fewer than 200 species; the bulk of Lepidoptera are in the Glossata. Similarly, within the Glossata, the bulk of species belong to the infraorder Heteroneura. Early patterns of divergence within Heteroneura cannot be defined with as much confidence, as there are still some disputes concerning patterns of evolutionary relatedness. At the family level, however, most groups are well defined, and the families are commonly used by hobbyists and scientists alike.

== Unassigned fossil lepidopterans ==
- Family unassigned (12 genera, 16 species)
- Family Archaeolepidae
- Family Mesokristenseniidae
- Family Eolepidopterigidae
- Family Undopterigidae

== Suborder Zeugloptera ==
- Superfamily Micropterigoidea
  - Family Micropterigidae

== Suborder Aglossata ==
- Superfamily Agathiphagoidea
  - Family Agathiphagidae

== Suborder Heterobathmiina ==
- Superfamily Heterobathmioidea
  - Family Heterobathmiidae

== Suborder Glossata ==
=== Infraorder Dacnonypha ===
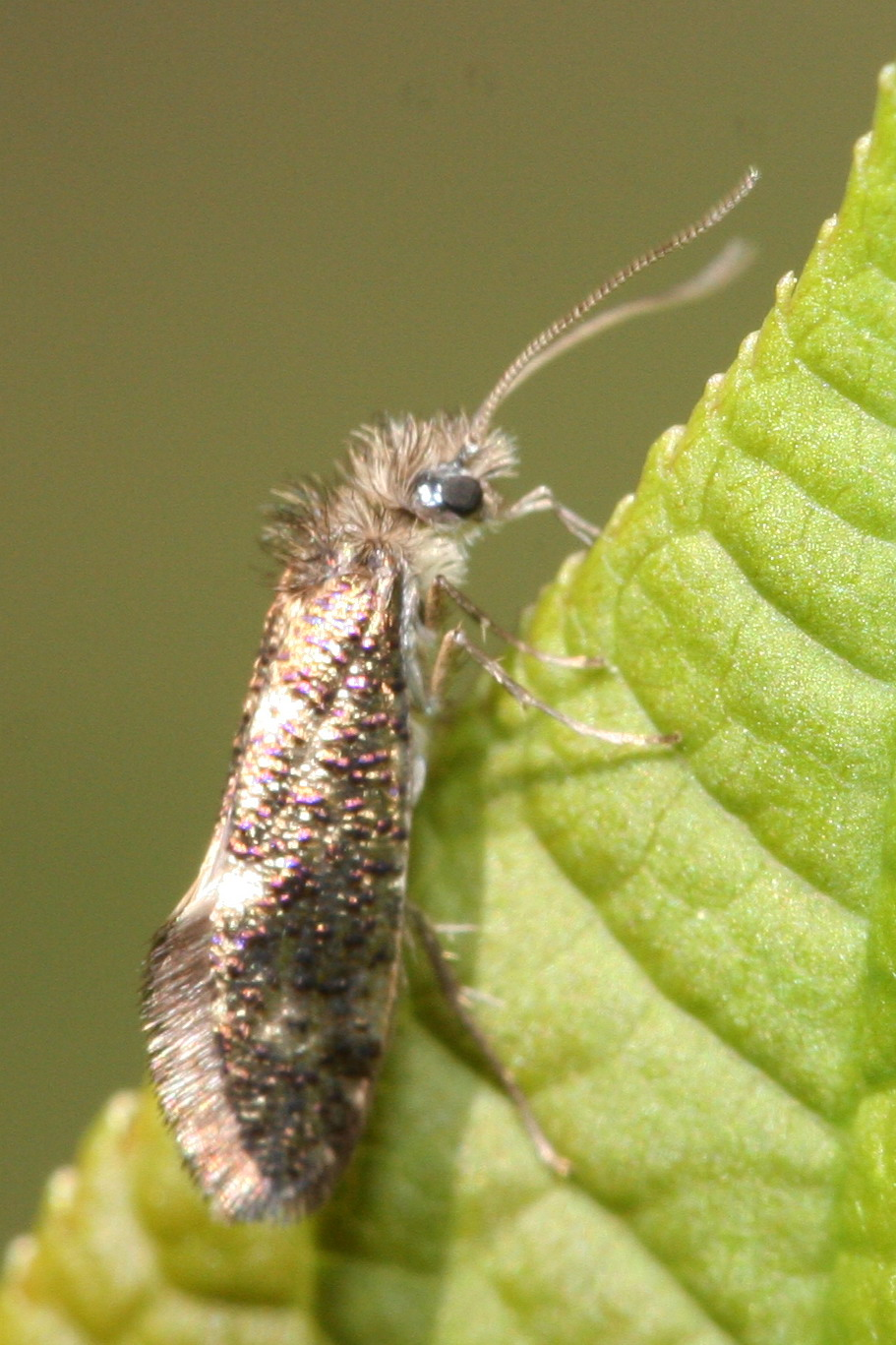
Dyseriocrania subpurpurella, an eriocranid moth

- Superfamily Eriocranioidea
  - Family Eriocraniidae

=== Infraorder Acanthoctesia ===
- Superfamily Acanthopteroctetoidea
  - Family Acanthopteroctetidae

=== Infraorder Lophocoronina ===
- Superfamily Lophocoronoidea
  - Family Lophocoronidae

=== Infraorder Neopseustina ===
- Superfamily Neopseustoidea
  - Family Neopseustidae
  - Family Aenigmatineidae

=== Infraorder Exoporia ===
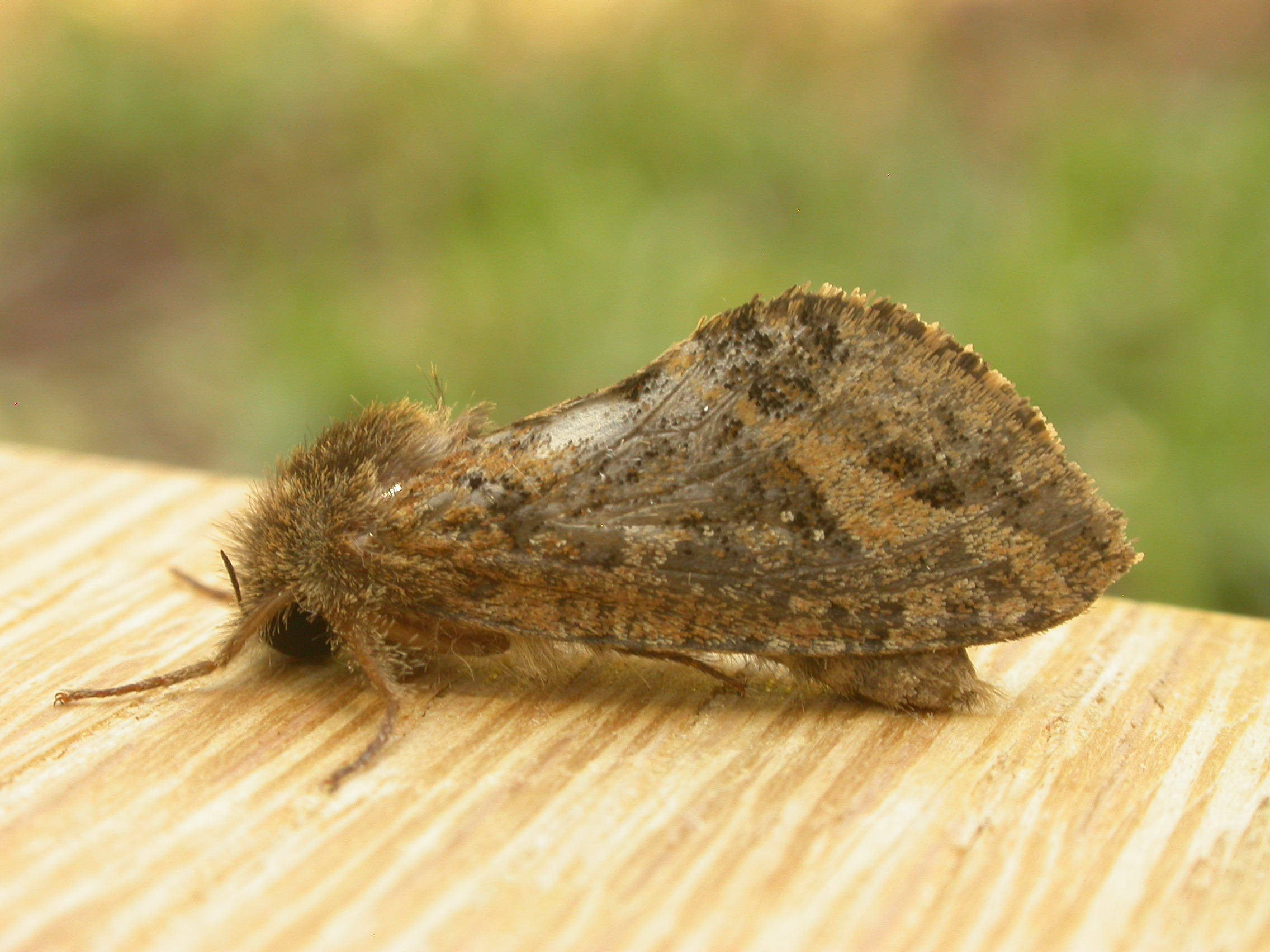
Oncopera brunneata, a hepalialid moth

- Superfamily Mnesarchaeoidea
  - Family Mnesarchaeidae
- Superfamily Hepialoidea
  - Family Palaeosetidae
  - Family Prototheoridae
  - Family Neotheoridae
  - Family Anomosetidae
  - Family Hepialidae

=== Infraorder Heteroneura ===
==== Clade Nepticulina ====
- Superfamily Nepticuloidea
  - Family Nepticulidae
  - Family Opostegidae

==== Clade Eulepidoptera, encompassing all remaining groups ====
===== Clade Incurvariina =====
- Superfamily Andesianoidea
  - Family Andesianidae
- Superfamily Adeloidea
  - Family Heliozelidae
  - Family Adelidae
  - Family Incurvariidae
  - Family Cecidosidae
  - Family Prodoxidae

===== Clade Etimonotrysia =====
- Superfamily Palaephatoidea
  - Family Palaephatidae
- Superfamily Tischerioidea
  - Family Tischeriidae

===== Clade Ditrysia, encompassing all remaining groups =====
- unassigned (25 genera, 100 species)
  - Family Millieriidae
- Superfamily Tineoidea
  - Family Acrolophidae
  - Family Eriocottidae
  - Family Psychidae (including former family Arrhenophanidae as a subfamily)
  - Family Tineidae
- Superfamily Gracillarioidea
  - Family Roeslerstammiidae
  - Family Bucculatricidae
  - Family Gracillariidae
- Superfamily Yponomeutoidea
  - Family Yponomeutidae
  - Family Argyresthiidae
  - Family Plutellidae
  - Family Glyphipterigidae
  - Family Ypsolophidae
  - Family Attevidae
  - Family Praydidae
  - Family Heliodinidae
  - Family Bedelliidae
  - Family Lyonetiidae

===== Clade Apoditrysia, encompassing all remaining groups =====
- unassigned superfamily
  - Family Douglasiidae
- Superfamily Simaethistoidea
  - Family Simaethistidae
- Superfamily Gelechioidea
  - Family Autostichidae
  - Family Lecithoceridae
  - Family Xyloryctidae
  - Family Blastobasidae
  - Family Oecophoridae
  - Family Schistonoeidae
  - Family Lypusidae
  - Family Chimabachidae
  - Family Peleopodidae
  - Family Elachistidae
  - Family Syringopaidae
  - Family Coelopoetidae
  - Family Stathmopodidae
  - Family Epimarptidae
  - Family Batrachedridae
  - Family Coleophoridae
  - Family Momphidae
  - Family Pterolonchidae
  - Family Scythrididae
  - Family Cosmopterigidae
  - Family Gelechiidae
- Superfamily Alucitoidea
  - Family Tineodidae
  - Family Alucitidae
- Superfamily Pterophoroidea
  - Family Pterophoridae
- Superfamily Carposinoidea
  - Family Copromorphidae
  - Family Carposinidae
- Superfamily Schreckensteinioidea
  - Family Schreckensteiniidae
- Superfamily Epermenioidea
  - Family Epermeniidae
- Superfamily Urodoidea
  - Family Urodidae
  - Family Ustyurtiidae
- Superfamily Immoidea
  - Family Immidae
- Superfamily Choreutoidea
  - Family Choreutidae
- Superfamily Galacticoidea
  - Family Galacticidae
- Superfamily Tortricoidea
  - Family Tortricidae
- Superfamily Cossoidea
  - Family Cossidae
  - Family Dudgeoneidae
- Superfamily Sesioidea
  - Family Brachodidae
  - Family Castniidae
  - Family Sesiidae
- Superfamily Zygaenoidea
  - Family Epipyropidae
  - Family Cyclotornidae
  - Family Heterogynidae
  - Family Lacturidae
  - Family Phaudidae
  - Family Dalceridae
  - Family Limacodidae
  - Family Megalopygidae
  - Family Aididae
  - Family Somabrachyidae
  - Family Himantopteridae
  - Family Zygaenidae

===== Clade Obtectomera, encompassing all remaining groups =====
- Superfamily Whalleyanoidea
  - Family Whalleyanidae
- Superfamily Thyridoidea
  - Family Thyrididae
- Superfamily Hyblaeoidea
  - Family Hyblaeidae
  - Family Prodidactidae
- Superfamily Calliduloidea
  - Family Callidulidae
- Superfamily Papilionoidea (butterflies)
  - Family Papilionidae
  - Family Hedylidae
  - Family Hesperiidae
  - Family Pieridae
  - Family Riodinidae
  - Family Lycaenidae
  - Family Nymphalidae
- Superfamily Pyraloidea
  - Family Pyralidae
  - Family Crambidae

===== Clade Macroheterocera (Macrolepidoptera sensu sticto), encompassing all remaining groups =====
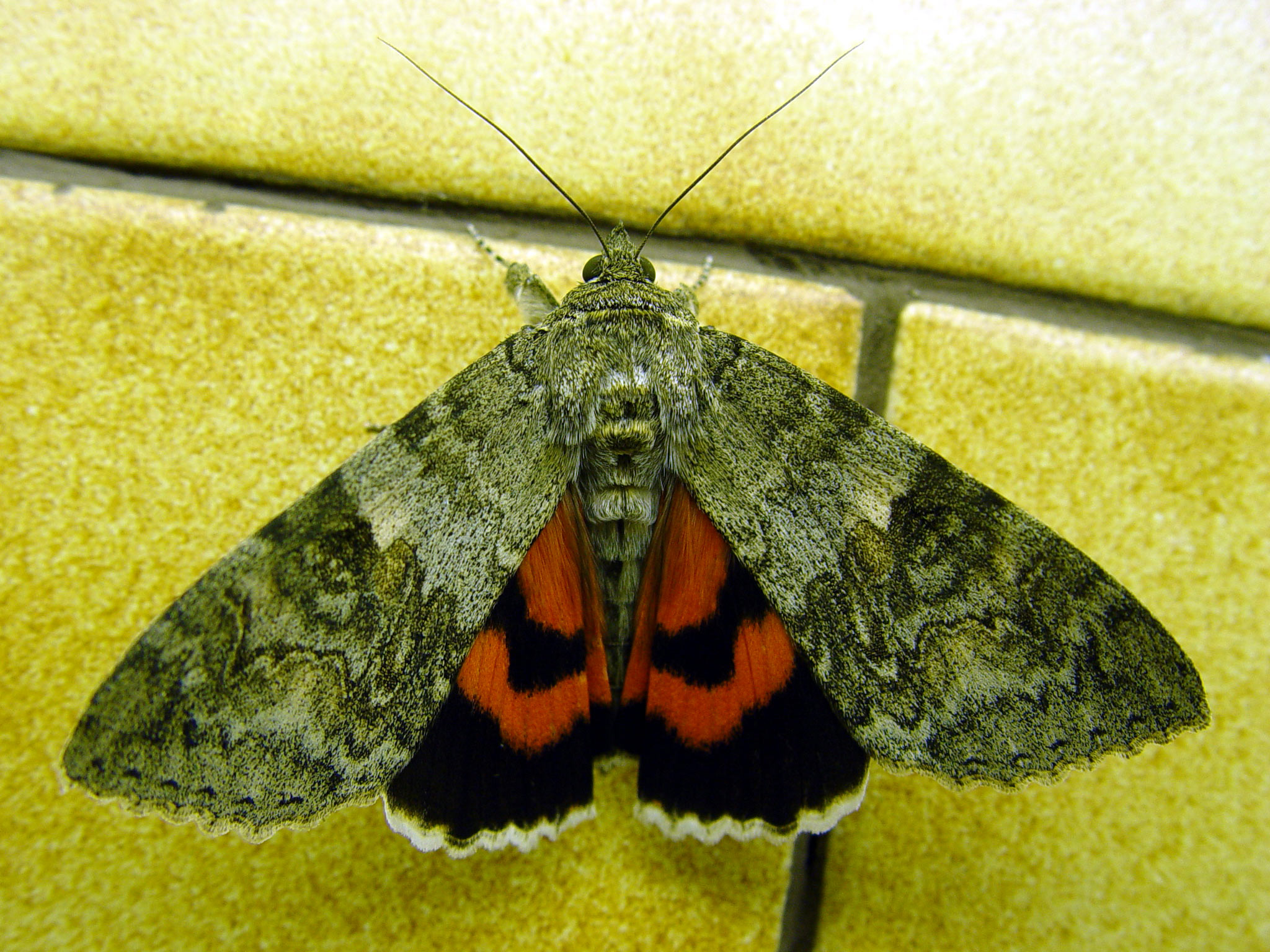
Catocala nupta, red underwing, a noctuid moth

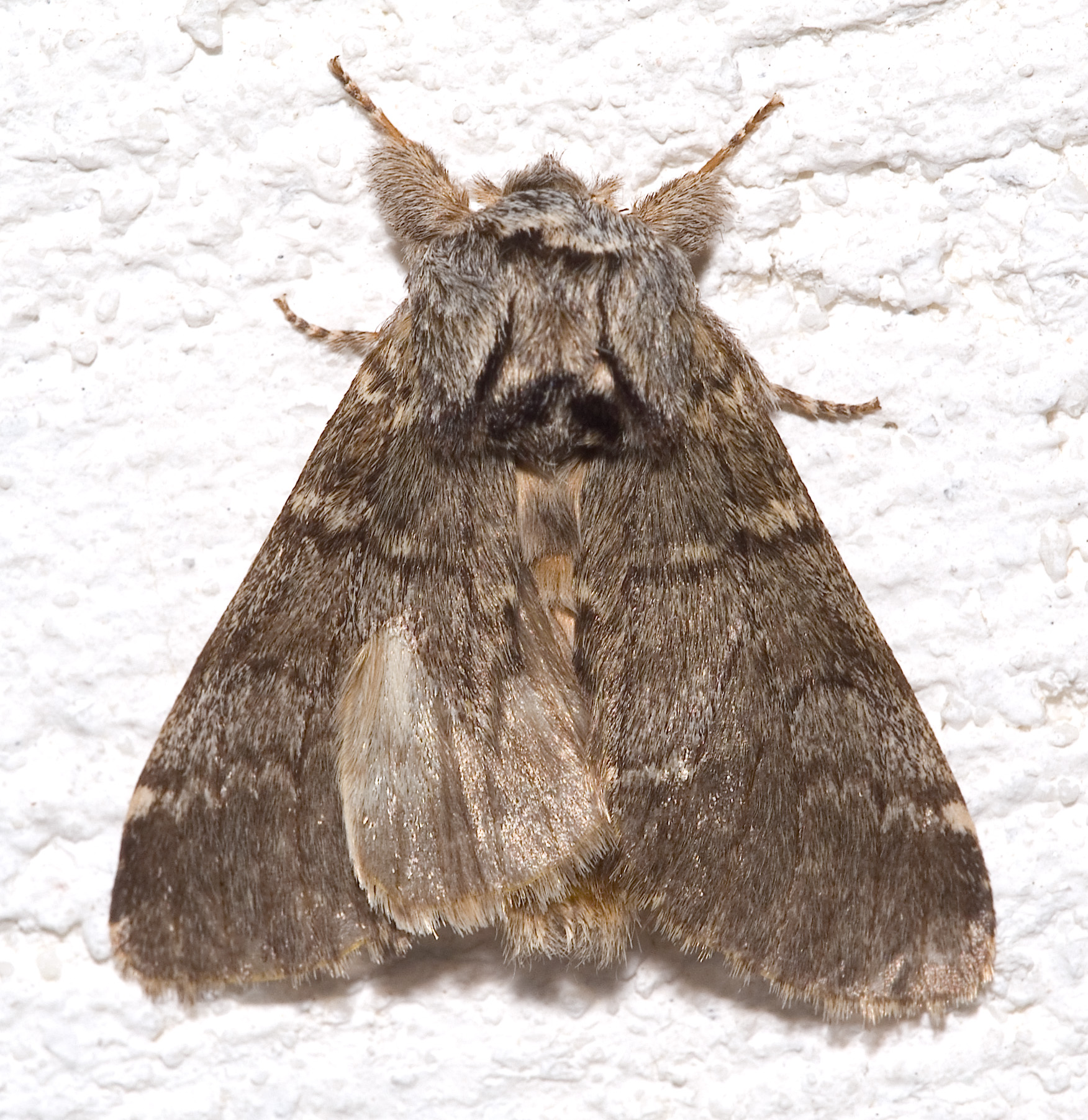
Drymonia ruficornis, a notodontid moth

- Superfamily Mimallonoidea
  - Family Mimallonidae
- Superfamily Drepanoidea
  - Family Cimeliidae
  - Family Doidae
  - Family Drepanidae
- Superfamily Lasiocampoidea
  - Family Lasiocampidae
- Superfamily Bombycoidea
  - Family Apatelodidae
  - Family Eupterotidae
  - Family Brahmaeidae
  - Family Phiditiidae
  - Family Anthelidae
  - Family Carthaeidae
  - Family Endromidae
  - Family Bombycidae
  - Family Saturniidae
  - Family Sphingidae
- Superfamily Geometroidea
  - Family Epicopeiidae
  - Family Pseudobistonidae
  - Family Sematuridae
  - Family Uraniidae
  - Family Geometridae
- Superfamily Noctuoidea
  - Family Oenosandridae
  - Family Notodontidae
  - Family Erebidae
  - Family Euteliidae
  - Family Nolidae
  - Family Noctuidae
