= Microlepidoptera =

Grouping of moths

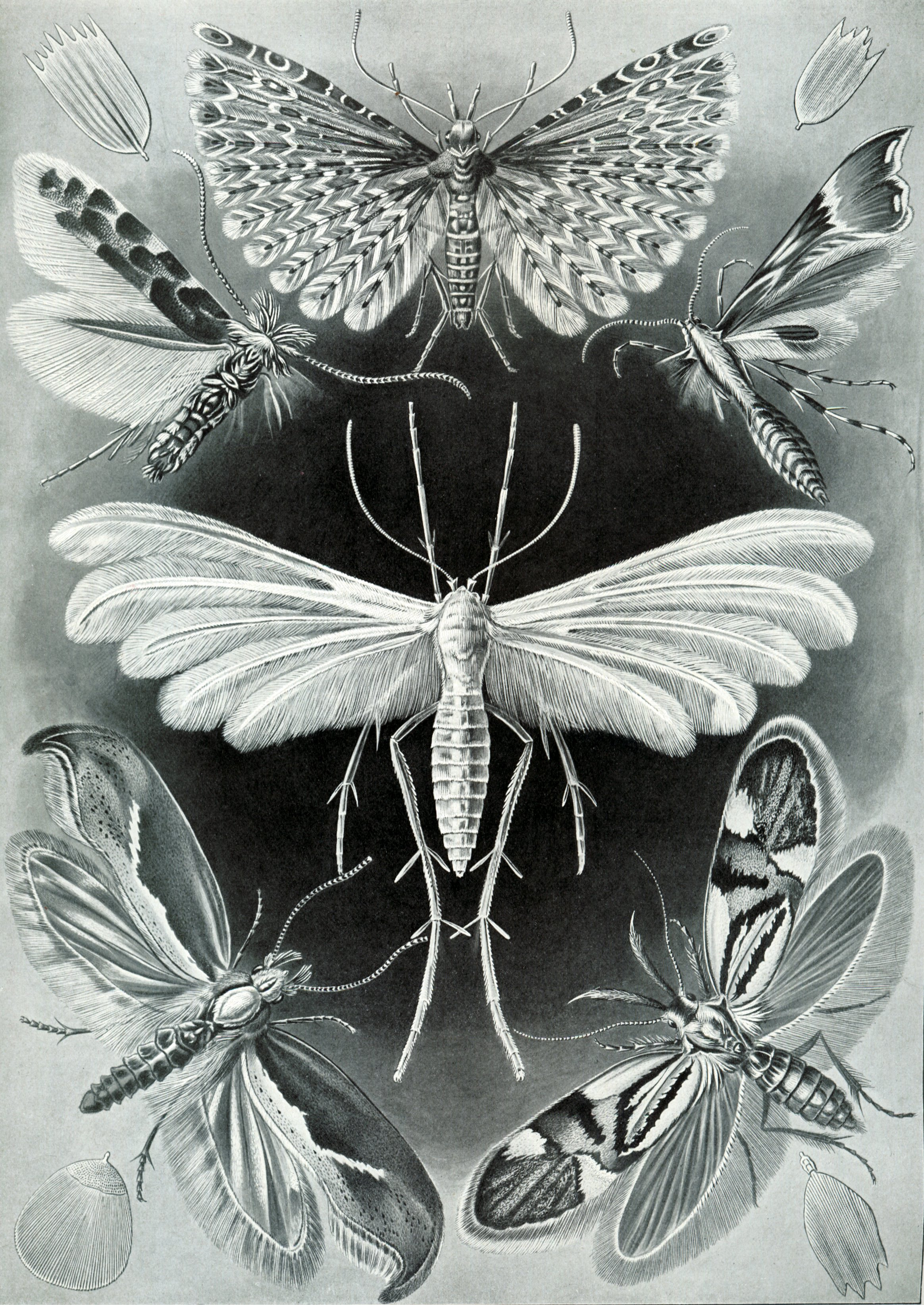
Some typical microlepidoptera: an alucitid many-plumed moth in the top centre; a white pterophorid plume moth in the centre.

Microlepidoptera (micromoths) is an artificial (i.e., unranked and not monophyletic) grouping of moth families, commonly known as the "smaller moths" (micro, Lepidoptera). These generally have wingspans of under 20 mm, so are harder to identify by external phenotypic markings than macrolepidoptera. They present some lifestyles that the larger Lepidoptera do not have, but this is not an identifying mark. Some hobbyists further divide this group into separate groups, such as leaf miners or rollers, stem or root borers, and then usually follow the more rigorous scientific taxonomy of lepidopterans. Efforts to stabilize the term have usually proven inadequate.

== Diversity ==
Vernacular usage divides the Lepidoptera simply into smaller and larger or into more-primitive and less-primitive groups, microlepidoptera and macrolepidoptera, respectively. Intuitively, the "micros" are any lepidopteran not currently placed in the macrolepidoptera. This paraphyletic assemblage, however, includes also the superfamilies Zygaenoidea, Sesioidea, and Cossoidea that would in common parlance normally be lumped with the "macros". A lepidopterist might call these groups "primitive macros". Furthermore, even all of the nonditrysian moths are not small. For example, the Hepialidae or "swift moths" (up to 25 cm wingspan) fall quite basally in the lepidopteran "tree of life". The primitive superfamily Andesianoidea was formerly included within the Cossoidae and elevated in 2001, these moths have up to an order of magnitude greater wingspan (5.5 cm) than most previously known monotrysian "micros". Whilst the smaller moths are usually also more seldom noticed, a more expansive "nonmacrolepidopteran" concept of the microlepidoptera would include about 37 out of the roughly 47 superfamilies.

Whilst usually less popular, micros are thus more important in the sense that they include a much wider span of the "tree of life" (i.e., phylogenetic diversity). Whereas they include no butterflies, micros do also include a surprising number of day-flying groups, and the advent of online identification resources in many countries (e.g. "UK moths") combined with the widespread use of digital macrophotography, is making them much easier to identify.

== Lifestyle ==
Microlepidoptera can be found in a broad variety of habitats and ecological niches worldwide, both terrestrial and freshwater aquatic (e.g. Acentropinae). They have a wide variety of feeding habits in both larval and adult life stages. Caterpillars feed on a wide variety of plant tissue and across a wide spectrum of plant groups from liverworts to angiosperms. They are either external feeders ("exophagous") or more usually feed internally ("endophagous"), typically as miners or tunnellers, but some feed on fungi, scavenge on dead animals, are parasitoids usually of other insects (some Zygaenoidea) or are detritivores, and Hyposmocoma molluscivora even feeds on live snails. Adult moths feed with mandibles on spores and pollen (Micropterigidae) on dew (e.g. Eriocraniidae), with their probosces on nectar (many groups e.g. Choreutidae) or are simply nonfeeding with mouthparts reduced or absent. The larvae of many smaller moths are considered economic pests, causing damage to plants, as well as fabrics and other manmade goods. Commonly noticed "micros" include the plume moth and the various species of clothes moth.

== Main groups ==
The list below is ordered initially in approximate order of species diversity and ecological abundance. The first four superfamilies listed here may comprise 90% of species in a sample of smaller moths and the listed characters may be of some assistance to sort these out, particularly the form of the labial palp and scaling of the proboscis (Robinson et al. 2001).

1. Curved horn moths, twirler moths, case-bearers and allies – 16,250 spp.

- Gelechioidea: Head smooth-scaled, labial palps usually are slender, recurved, with the terminal segment long and pointed; the long proboscis bears scales on basal half. Resting posture very varied.
  - Gelechiidae – twirler moths
  - Oecophoridae – concealer moths
  - Lecithoceridae – tropical longhorned moths
  - Cosmopterigidae – cosmet moths
  - Coleophoridae – case-bearers
  - Elachistidae – grass-miner miners
  - Momphidae – mompha moths
  - Ethmiidae
  - Blastobasidae – scavenger moths
  - Batrachedridae – flower moths
  - Scythrididae – flower moths
  - Pterolonchidae – lance-wing moths
  - Symmocidae
  - Agonoxenidae – palm moths
  - Holcopogonidae
  - Metachandidae

2. Pyralids, snout moths and grass moths – 16,000 spp.

- Pyraloidea: Head rough-scaled, proboscis scaled, tympanal organs on abdomen; labial palps usually not recurved, terminal segment usually blunt. Hindwing veins ("Sc" + "R1") and "Rs" are close or fused in the middle of the wing; resting posture usually either with wings tightly rolled or and held quite flat to surface in triangular shape and with labial palps often projecting forward, giving Concorde-like appearance; antennae often swept back parallel together over body. Generally they are considered the closest group to 'macrolepidoptera', and maybe ancestral to it, macrolepidoptera itself is not a universally accepted taxon.
  - Pyralidae – pyrales or snout moths
  - Crambidae – grass moths

3. Tortrix moths, leaf-roller moths, bell moths, codling moths and allies – 6,200 spp.

- Tortricidae: Head rough-scaled, labial palps with short blunt apical segment, basal half of proboscis not scaled; wings held over back in tent-like or flattened position; forewing costa often quite strongly convex or sinuate in many Tortricinae giving bell-like shape

4. Clothes moths, bagworms and allies – 4,200 spp.

- Tineoidea: Head often with tufty erect scales; labial palps usually have bristles on middle segment and terminal segment is long; wings usually held over back in tent-like position and head close to surface; tineids often run fast
  - Tineidae – clothes moths and fungus moths
  - Eriocottidae – Old World spiny winged moths
  - Acrolophidae – tube moths
  - Arrhenophanidae – tropical lattice moths
  - Psychidae – bagworm moths
  - Lypusidae – European bagworm moths

5, 6. Leaf miner moths – 3,200 spp.

- Gracillarioidea – 2,300 spp.
  - Gracillariidae – blotch leaf miner moths
  - Bucculatricidae – ribbed cocoon makers
  - Douglasiidae – Douglas moths
  - Roeslerstammiidae – double-eye moths
- Nepticuloidea – 900 spp. - eyecap moths
  - Nepticulidae – pygmy eyecap moths
  - Opostegidae – white eyecap moths

7. Ermine moths, webworm moths, yucca moths and allies – 1,500 spp.

- Yponomeutoidea
  - Yponomeutidae – ermine moths
  - Acrolepiidae – false diamond-back moths
  - Ypsolophidae
  - Plutellidae – diamond-back moths and allies
  - Glyphipterigidae – sedge moths
  - Heliodinidae – sun moths
  - Bedelliidae
  - Lyonetiidae – lyonet moths

8, 9. Plume moths – 1,160 spp.

- Pterophoridae – plume moths – 1,000 spp.
- Alucitidae – many-plumed moths – 160 spp.

10. Tropical leaf moths or picture-winged moths – more than 1000 spp.

- Thyrididae: Small mainly dayflying moths:

11. Fairy moths, longhorn moths and allies – 600 spp.

- Adeloidea
  - Incurvariidae – leaf-cutter moths
  - Adelidae – fairy moths
  - Heliozelidae – shield-bearer leaf-miners
  - Prodoxidae – yucca moths
  - Cecidosidae – gall moths

12. Metalmark moths – 402 spp.

- Choreutidae

13. Mandibulate archaic moths – 180 spp.

- Micropterigidae

14. Sparkling archaic sun moths or spring jewel moths – 24 spp.

- Eriocraniidae

Superfamilies less likely to be encountered:

15. Tropical fruitworm moths – 318 spp.

- Copromorphoidea
  - Copromorphidae
  - Carposinidae

16. Fringe tufted moths – 83 spp.

- Epermeniidae

17. Blackberry leaf skeletonizer and allies – 8 spp.

- Schreckensteiniidae

18. Immid moths – 250 spp.

- Immidae

19. False burnet moths – 60 spp.

- Urodidae

20. Tropical teak moths – 20 spp.

- Hyblaeidae

21. Whalley's Malagasy moths – 2 spp.

- Whalleyanidae

More rarely encountered "primitive" families:

22. Kauri pine moths – 2 spp.

- Agathiphagidae

22. Southern beech moths or Valdivian archaic moths – 9 spp.

- Heterobathmiidae

23. Archaic sun moths – 4 spp.

- Acanthopteroctetidae

24. Australian archaic sun moths – 6 spp.

- Lophocoronidae

25. Archaic bell moths – 12 spp.

- Neopseustidae

26. New Zealand endemic moths – 7 spp.

- Mnesarchaeidae

27. Gondwanaland moths – 60 spp.

- Palaephatidae

28. Trumpet leaf miner moths – 107 spp.

- Tischeriidae

29. Simaethistid moths – 4 spp.

- Simaethistidae

30. Galacticoid moths or webworm moths – 17 spp.

- Galacticidae

=== Larger "micros" ===
These groups have been formerly included in macros by hobbyists. 'Archaic and primitive macros' is not a recommended name for these as it may create confusion of their placement in some classification systems.

31. Swift moths and allies – 544 spp.

- Hepialoidea
  - Hepialidae – swift moths
  - Anomosetidae – Australian primitive ghost moths
  - Prototheoridae – African primitive ghost moths
  - Neotheoridae – Amazonian primitive ghost moths
  - Palaeosetidae – miniature ghost moths

Unassigned to superfamily:

32. Meyrick's mystic moth – 1 sp.

- Prodidactidae

Large monotrysian micros:

33. Andean endemic moths – 3 spp.

- Andesianidae

Large ditrysian micros (formerly 'primitive macros'):

34. Burnet moths, slug moths, hag moths, glass moths and allies – 2,600 spp.

- Zygaenoidea
  - Zygaenidae – burnet and forester moths
  - Limacodidae – slug moths or saddleback caterpillar moths
  - Megalopygidae – flannel moths
  - Epipyropidae – planthopper parasite moths
  - Heterogynidae – Mediterranean burnet moths
  - Himantopteridae – long-tailed burnet moths
  - Anomoeotidae
  - Cyclotornidae – Australian parasite moths
  - Somabrachyidae – African flannel moths
  - Dalceridae – glass moths
  - Lacturidae – Australian burnet moths
  - Aididae

35. Clearwing moths, castniid moths, little bear moths and allies – 1,300 spp.

- Sesioidea
  - Sesiidae – clearwing moths
  - Castniidae – castniid moths
  - Brachodidae – little bear moths

36, 37. Goat or carpenter moths and allies – 676 spp.

- Cossoidea
  - Cossidae – goat moths, leopard moths or carpenterworm moths
  - Dudgeoneidae – Dudgeon carpenterworm moths

== Sources ==
- Robinson, G.S., Tuck, K.R., Shaffer, M. and Cook, K. (1994). The smaller moths of South-East Asia. Malaysian Nature Society, Kuala Lumpur.
- Common Name Index
