= Lepidopteran diversity =

180,000 species of Lepidoptera are described, equivalent to 10% of the total described species of living organisms. This is a list of the diversity of the Lepidoptera showing the estimated number of genera and species described for each superfamily and, where available, family. See Lepidoptera for a note of the schedule of families used.

Superfamily	Family	Genera	Species
Micropterigiodea	Micropterigidae	6	182
Agathiphagoidea	Agathiphagidae	1	2
Heterobathmioidea	Heterobathmiidae	1	9
Eriocranioidea	Eriocraniidae	6	25
Acanthopteroctedoidea	Acanthopteroctetidae	2	5
Lophocoronoidea	Lophocoronidae	1	6
Neopseustoidea	Neopseustidae	3	10
Mnesarchaeoidea	Mnesarchaeidae	1	14
Hepialoidea		68	630
	Anomosetidae	1	1
	Hepialidae	61	606
	Neotheoridae	1	1
	Palaeosetidae	4	7
	Prototheoridae	1	15
Nepticuloidea		29	1,076
	Nepticulidae	22	862
	Opostegidae	7	214
Adeloidea		72	598
	Adelidae		
	Cecidosidae		
	Heliozelidae		
	Incurvariidae		
	Prodoxidae	12	80
Palaephatoidea	Palaephatidae	7	60
Tischerioidea	Tischeriidae	5	110
Simaethistoidea	Simaethistidae	2	4
Tineoidea		406	4,352
	Acrolophidae		300
	Arrhenophanidae	5	26
	Eriocottidae		
	Lypusidae		
	Psychidae		
	Tineidae	320	3,000
Gracillarioidea		90	2,315
	Bucculatricidae		
	Douglasiidae		
	Gracillariidae	75	2,000
	Roeslerstammiidae		
Yponomeutoidea		83	1,578
	Acrolepiidae		
	Bedelliidae		
	Glyphipterigidae		384
	Heliodinidae		
	Lyonetiidae		
	Plutellidae		100
	Yponomeutidae		600
	Ypsolophidae		
Gelechioidea		1,390	15,966
	Agonoxenidae		
	Batrachedridae		
	Blastobasidae		
	Coleophoridae	43	1,418
	Cosmopterigidae	106	1,628
	Elachistidae	165	3,270
	Ethmiidae		
	Gelechiidae	507	4,530
	Holcopogonidae		
	Lecithoceridae		
	Metachandidae		
	Momphidae		
	Oecophoridae		
	Pterolonchidae		
	Scythrididae		
	Symmocidae		
Galacticoidea	Galacticidae	3	17
Zygaenoidea		98	2,700
	Aididae		
	Anomoeotidae		
	Cyclotornidae	1	5
	Dalceridae		
	Epipyropidae		
	Heterogynidae		
	Himantopteridae		
	Lacturidae		
	Limacodidae		1,100
	Megalopygidae		
	Somabrachyidae		
	Zygaenidae		
Cossoidea		114	676
	Cossidae	113	670
	Dudgeoneidae	1	
Sesioidea		149	1,360
	Brachodidae		150
	Castniidae		
	Sesiidae	149	1,362
Choreutoidea	Choreutidae	12	405
Tortricoidea	Tortricidae	755	6,338
Urodoidea		4	62
	Urodidae	3	60
	Ustyurtiidae	1	2
Schreckensteinioidea	Schreckensteiniidae	4	12
Epermenioidea	Epermeniidae	5	83
Alucitoidea		15	158
	Alucitidae		130
	Tineodidae		
Pterophoroidea	Pterophoridae	73	986
Whalleyanoidea	Whalleyanidae	1	2
Immoidea	Immidae	6	246
Copromorphoidea		29	318
	Carposinidae		
	Copromorphidae		
Hyblaeoidea	Hyblaeidae	2	18
Pyraloidea		2,092	15,576
	Crambidae	1,015	10,094
	Pyralidae	1,077	5,900
Thyridoidea	Thyrididae	12	1,220
Mimallonoidea	Mimallonidae	41	291
Lasiocampoidea		158	1,575
	Anthelidae		
	Lasiocampidae	150	1,500
Bombycoidea		466	3,425
	Bombycidae		
	Brahmaeidae		
	Carthaeidae		
	Endromidae		
	Eupterotidae		
	Lemoniidae		
	Mirinidae		
	Saturniidae	165	1,480
	Sphingidae	200	1,200
Cimelioidea	Cimeliidae	2	6
Calliduloidea	Callidulidae	8	60
Hedyloidea	Hedylidae	1	40
Hesperioidea	Hesperiidae	550	3,500
Papilionoidea		1,400	14,000
	Lycaenidae	566	4,698
	Nymphalidae	633	5,698
	Papilionidae	26	605
	Pieridae	74	1,051
	Riodinidae	140	1,250
Drepanoidea		129	675
	Drepanidae	123	665
Geometroidea		2,107	23,748
	Epicopeiidae	9	20
	Geometridae	2,002	23,002
	Sematuridae	6	40
	Uraniidae	90	686
Noctuoidea		7,250	70,000
	Arctiidae		11,000
	Doidae		
	Erebidae	1,760	24,569
	Euteliidae	29	520
	Lymantriidae	360	2,500
	Noctuidae	1,089	11,772
	Nolidae	186	1,738
	Notodontidae	704	3,800
	Oenosandridae	4	8
	Pantheidae		
