= Simaethistis tricolor =

Scientific classification
- Kingdom: Animalia
- Phylum: Arthropoda
- Class: Insecta
- Order: Lepidoptera
- Family: Simaethistidae
- Genus: Simaethistis
- Species: S. tricolor

Binomial name
- Simaethistis tricolor Butler, 1889

Species of moth

Simaethistis tricolor is a moth in the family Simaethistidae. It was described by Arthur Gardiner Butler in 1889. It is known from India.
