= Sun moth =

Sun moth may refer to several families of moths:

- Acanthopteroctetidae
- Castniidae
- Heliodinidae
