= Simaethistis leechi =

Scientific classification
- Kingdom: Animalia
- Phylum: Arthropoda
- Class: Insecta
- Order: Lepidoptera
- Family: Simaethistidae
- Genus: Simaethistis
- Species: S. leechi

Binomial name
- Simaethistis leechi South, 1901

Species of moth

Simaethistis leechi is a moth in the family Simaethistidae. It was described by South in 1901. It is known from China.
