= Merga =

Merga may refer to:

- 38 Boötis, a star in the constellation Boötes also known as Merga
- Prototheora merga, a species of moth of the family Prototheoridae
- Pesh merga, term used by Kurds to refer to armed Kurdish fighters
- Merga Bien (late 1560s – 1603), German woman convicted of witchcraft and killed

== Ethiopian name ==
Merga (Amharic: መርጋ) is a male name of Ethiopian origin

- Deriba Merga (born 1980), Ethiopian long-distance runner and 2009 Boston Marathon winner
- Imane Merga (born 1988), Ethiopian long-distance runner and cross country world champion
