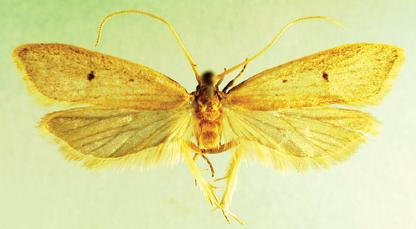

Scientific classification
- Kingdom: Animalia
- Phylum: Arthropoda
- Class: Insecta
- Order: Lepidoptera
- Family: Lecithoceridae
- Genus: Lecithocera
- Species: L. dondavisi

Binomial name
- Lecithocera dondavisi Park, 2013

= Lecithocera dondavisi =

Species of moth in genus Lecithocera

Lecithocera dondavisi is a moth in the family Lecithoceridae. It is found in Taiwan.

== Description ==
The wingspan is 23 to 26 millimetres (0.91 to 1.02 in). The forewings are pale grayish orange, speckled with fine dark-brown scales, more dense posteriorly. The hindwings are pale gray and broader than the forewings.

== Etymology ==
The species is named after Donald R. Davis, curator of Lepidoptera at the National Museum of Natural History, Smithsonian Institution, United States, an authority on the microlepidoptera of the world.
