= Limenarchis =

Scientific classification
- Kingdom: Animalia
- Phylum: Arthropoda
- Clade: Pancrustacea
- Class: Insecta
- Order: Lepidoptera
- Family: Gelechiidae
- Subfamily: Gelechiinae
- Genus: Limenarchis; Meyrick, 1926

Genus of moths

Limenarchis is a genus of twirler moth that belongs to the subfamily Gelechiinae.

== Taxonomy ==
The genus was described in 1926 by Edward Meyrick, an English amateur entomologist who is considered an expert on microlepidoptera and founders of modern microlepidopteran systematics.

=== Species ===
The genus contains two species. They are listed below:

- Limenarchis pullata Bradley, 1961
- Limenarchis zonodeta Meyrick, 1926
