= Heterobathmia diffusa =

Scientific classification
- Domain: Eukaryota
- Kingdom: Animalia
- Phylum: Arthropoda
- Class: Insecta
- Order: Lepidoptera
- Family: Heterobathmiidae
- Genus: Heterobathmia
- Species: H. diffusa

Binomial name
- Heterobathmia diffusa Kristensen & Nielsen, 1979

Primitive moth species

Heterobathmia diffusa is a moth of the family Heterobathmiidae. It was first described by Niels Peder Kristensen and Ebbe Nielsen in 1979. It is found in Argentina.
