= Tornatellides lordhowensis =

Scientific classification
- Domain: Eukaryota
- Kingdom: Animalia
- Phylum: Mollusca
- Class: Gastropoda
- Order: Stylommatophora
- Family: Achatinellidae
- Genus: Tornatellides
- Species: T. lordhowensis

Binomial name
- Tornatellides lordhowensis Shea & Griffiths, 2010
- Location of Lord Howe Island

Species of land snail

Tornatellides lordhowensis, also known as the Lord Howe miniature treesnail, is a species of tree snail that is endemic to Australia's Lord Howe Island in the Tasman Sea.

== Description ==
The globose, ovately conical shell of adult snails is 2.4–2.6 mm in height, with a diameter of 2–2.1 mm, with weakly impressed sutures and rounded whorls with fine spiral grooves. It is pale gold in colour. The umbilicus is narrowly open. The aperture is subovate.

== Habitat ==
The snail occurs mainly in the central part of the island, in rainforest and low littoral vegetation, inhabiting leaf litter and the leaves of grasses and shrubs.
