= Prototheora parachlora =

Scientific classification
- Kingdom: Animalia
- Phylum: Arthropoda
- Class: Insecta
- Order: Lepidoptera
- Family: Prototheoridae
- Genus: Prototheora
- Species: P. parachlora

Binomial name
- Prototheora parachlora (Meyrick, 1919)

Synonyms
- Metatheora parachlora Meyrick, 1919; Prototheora paraglossa Janse, 1942

Species of moth

Prototheora parachlora is a species of moth of the family Prototheoridae. It is found in South Africa, where it is only known from the Karkloof Forest region of KwaZulu-Natal.

The wingspan is about 15 mm. The only known adult was collected in late January.
