= Prototheora geniculata =

Scientific classification
- Domain: Eukaryota
- Kingdom: Animalia
- Phylum: Arthropoda
- Class: Insecta
- Order: Lepidoptera
- Family: Prototheoridae
- Genus: Prototheora
- Species: P. geniculata

Binomial name
- Prototheora geniculata Davis, 1996

Species of moth

Prototheora geniculata is a species of moth of the family Prototheoridae. It is found in South Africa, where it known only from the Schoemanspoort in the Cape Province, which is located in a southern extension of the Karoo desert, generally referred to as the Little Karoo.

The wingspan is 14–17 mm. Adults have been recorded in mid-March.
