= Acanthopteroctetes aurulenta =

Scientific classification
- Domain: Eukaryota
- Kingdom: Animalia
- Phylum: Arthropoda
- Class: Insecta
- Order: Lepidoptera
- Family: Acanthopteroctetidae
- Genus: Acanthopteroctetes
- Species: A. aurulenta

Binomial name
- Acanthopteroctetes aurulenta Davis, 1984

Species of moth

Acanthopteroctetes aurulenta is a moth of the family Acanthopteroctetidae. It was described by Donald R. Davis in 1984. It is found in north-western Oregon, central Utah, and Colorado.

The wingspan is about 15 mm (0.6 in). The forewings are uniformly light golden brown.
