= Prototheora malawiensis =

Scientific classification
- Kingdom: Animalia
- Phylum: Arthropoda
- Clade: Pancrustacea
- Class: Insecta
- Order: Lepidoptera
- Family: Prototheoridae
- Genus: Prototheora
- Species: P. malawiensis

Binomial name
- Prototheora malawiensis Davis, 2001

Species of moth

Prototheora malawiensis is a species of moth of the family Prototheoridae. It is found in Malawi.
