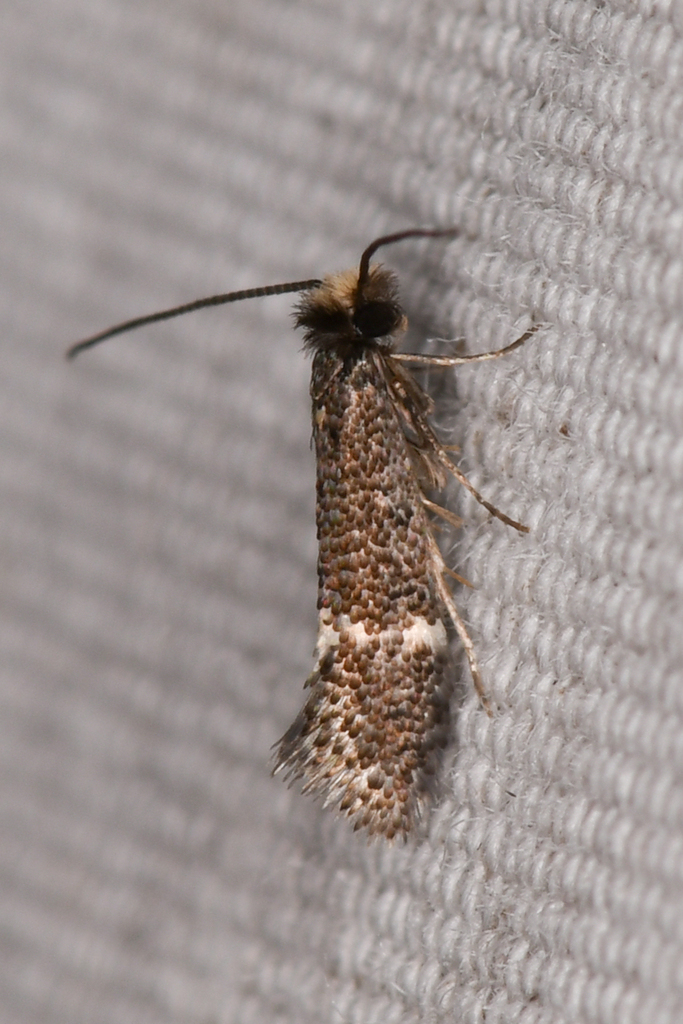

Scientific classification
- Kingdom: Animalia
- Phylum: Arthropoda
- Class: Insecta
- Order: Lepidoptera
- Family: Acanthopteroctetidae
- Genus: Acanthopteroctetes
- Species: A. unifascia

Binomial name
- Acanthopteroctetes unifascia Davis, 1978

= Acanthopteroctetes unifascia =

Species of moth

Acanthopteroctetes unifascia is a moth of the family Acanthopteroctetidae. It was described by Davis in 1978. It is found in Montana.

The wingspan is about 11 mm for males. The forewings are fuscous with a slight coppery luster and with three large, pale yellowish spots. The hindwings are slightly paler and the scales here are narrower. Adults are on wing in July, probably in one generation per year.

Studies on Acanthopteroctetes unifascia have shown that it retains several ancestral traits while also displaying unique specializations in both its larval trunk and adult head structures. These characteristics suggest that the species represents an important transitional form in moth evolution, providing insight into early anatomy and the development of moth adaptations.
