= Dudgeonea leucosticta =

Scientific classification
- Kingdom: Animalia
- Phylum: Arthropoda
- Class: Insecta
- Order: Lepidoptera
- Family: Dudgeoneidae
- Genus: Dudgeonea
- Species: D. leucosticta

Binomial name
- Dudgeonea leucosticta Hampson, 1900

Species of moth

Dudgeonea leucosticta is a moth in the Dudgeoneidae family. It is found in India, Sri Lanka and Malaysia. Two subspecies are recognized. Nominate subspecies from Asia and D. l. sierraleonensis from Sierra Leone.

In 1996, the species was found from Borneo. A male was collected from hill dipterocarp forest in Kinabalu National Park.
