= Prototheora petrosema =

Scientific classification
- Kingdom: Animalia
- Phylum: Arthropoda
- Clade: Pancrustacea
- Class: Insecta
- Order: Lepidoptera
- Family: Prototheoridae
- Genus: Prototheora
- Species: P. petrosema

Binomial name
- Prototheora petrosema Meyrick, 1917

Species of moth

Prototheora petrosema is a moth species of the family Prototheoridae. It is found in Western Cape and Eastern Cape provinces of South Africa. It lives in the predominantly fynbos cape vegetation of the temperate Knysna Forest. It has been found frequently around the lower slopes of Table Mountain in Cape Town.

The wingspan is 18–23 mm. Adults have been recorded from the beginning of March to mid-May.
