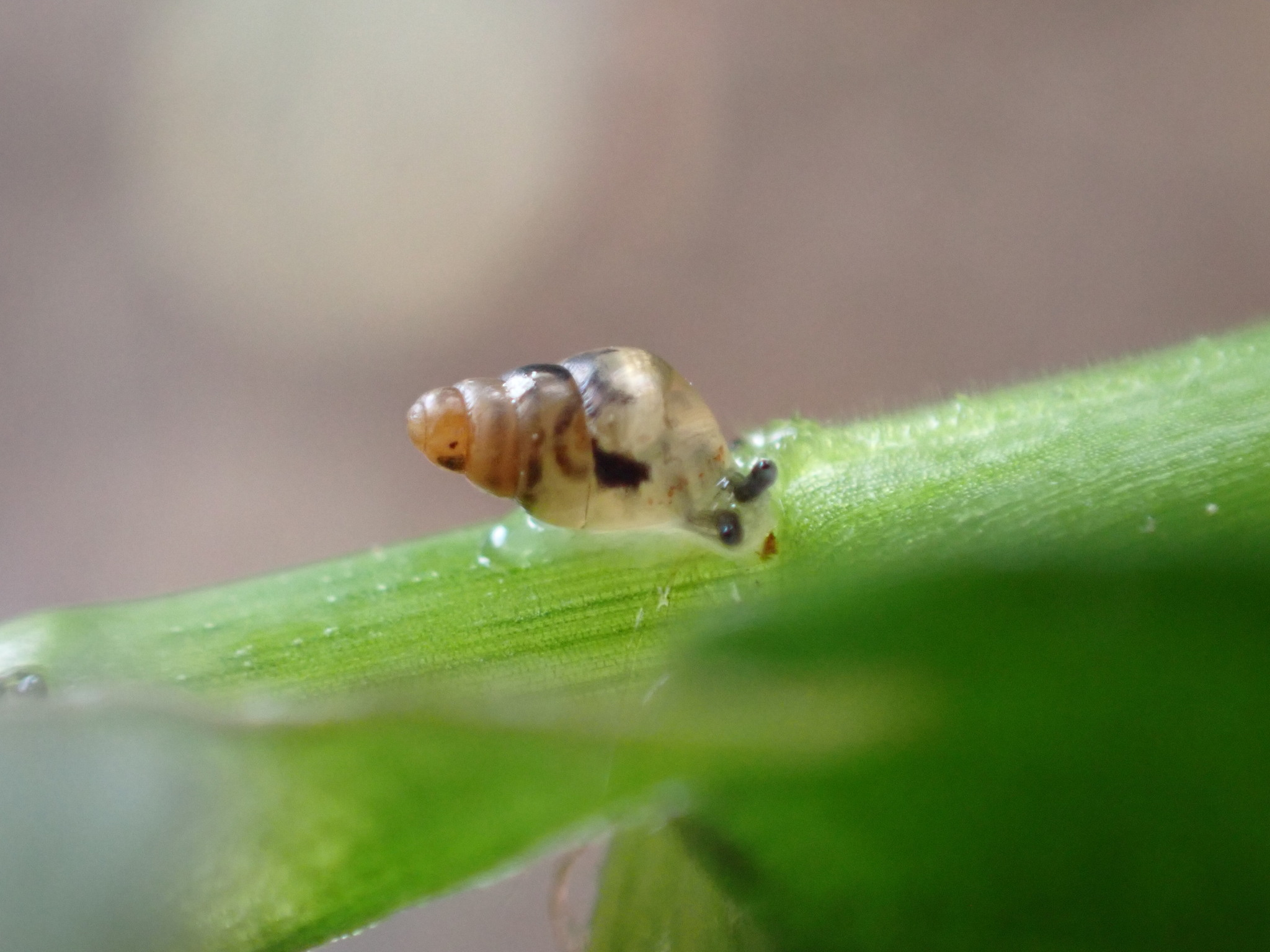
- Tornatellides subperforatus

Scientific classification
- Kingdom: Animalia
- Phylum: Mollusca
- Class: Gastropoda
- Order: Stylommatophora
- Family: Achatinellidae
- Genus: Tornatellides; Pilsbry, 1910

Species
- See text.

= Tornatellides =

Genus of gastropods

Tornatellides is a genus of minute, air-breathing land snails, terrestrial gastropod mollusks, or micromolluscs in the family Achatinellidae.

== Distribution ==
This genus is endemic to the islands of the South Pacific.

== Predators ==
Individuals of the Hawaiian species are preyed upon by caterpillars of the moth Hyposmocoma molluscivora.

== Species ==
Species within the genus Tornatellides include:

- Tornatellides attenuatus
- Tornatellides bellus
- Tornatellides boeningi (Schmacker and Boettger, 1891)
- Tornatellides brunneus
- Tornatellides bryani
- Tornatellides comes
- Tornatellides compactus
- Tornatellides confusus
- Tornatellides cyphostyla
- Tornatellides diptyx
- Tornatellides drepanophorus
- Tornatellides euryomphala
- Tornatellides forbesi
- Tornatellides frit
- Tornatellides idae
- Tornatellides inornatus
- Tornatellides insignis
- Tornatellides irregularis
- Tornatellides kahoolavensis
- Tornatellides kahukuensis
- Tornatellides kamaloensis
- Tornatellides kilauea
- Tornatellides konaensis
- Tornatellides leptospira
- Tornatellides lordhowensis
- Tornatellides macromphala
- Tornatellides macroptychia
- Tornatellides moomomiensis
- Tornatellides neckeri
- Tornatellides oahuensis
- Tornatellides oncospira
- Tornatellides oswaldi
- Tornatellides perkinsi
- Tornatellides pilsbryi
- Tornatellides plagioptyx
- Tornatellides popouelensis
- Tornatellides prionoptychia
- Tornatellides procerulus
- Tornatellides productus
- Tornatellides pyramidatus
- Tornatellides ronaldi
- Tornatellides rudicostatus
- Tornatellides serrarius
- Tornatellides spaldingi
- Tornatellides stokesi
- Tornatellides subangulatus
- Tornatellides subperforata
- Tornatellides terebra
- Tornatellides tryoni
- Tornatellides virgula
- Tornatellides vitreus
- Tornatellides waianaensis
