= Cyclotorna egena =

Scientific classification
- Domain: Eukaryota
- Kingdom: Animalia
- Phylum: Arthropoda
- Class: Insecta
- Order: Lepidoptera
- Family: Cyclotornidae
- Genus: Cyclotorna
- Species: C. egena

Binomial name
- Cyclotorna egena Meyrick, 1912

Species of moth

Cyclotorna egena is a moth of the family Cyclotornidae. It is found in Australia, including New South Wales and Queensland.

== Original description ==
female 12-13 mm. Head whitish. Antennæ, thorax, and abdomen fuscous. Legs pale fuscous; posterior pair ochreous-whitish. Forewings elongate-oval, costa rather strongly arched, apex rounded, termen obliquely rounded, dorsum strongly arched before middle; a hyaline fovea on underside beneath costal vein at 1/4; fuscous, with fine whitish irroration; a suffusedly darker roundish spot above dorsum beyond middle, and a second in middisc at 2/3; cilia grey, with some whitish irroration. Hindwings with vein 4 absent; grey; cilia grey. N.Q.: Townsville, in October and December; two specimens, of which one is in Coll. Lyell, received from Mr. F. P. Dodd.

— Original description by Edward Meyrick
