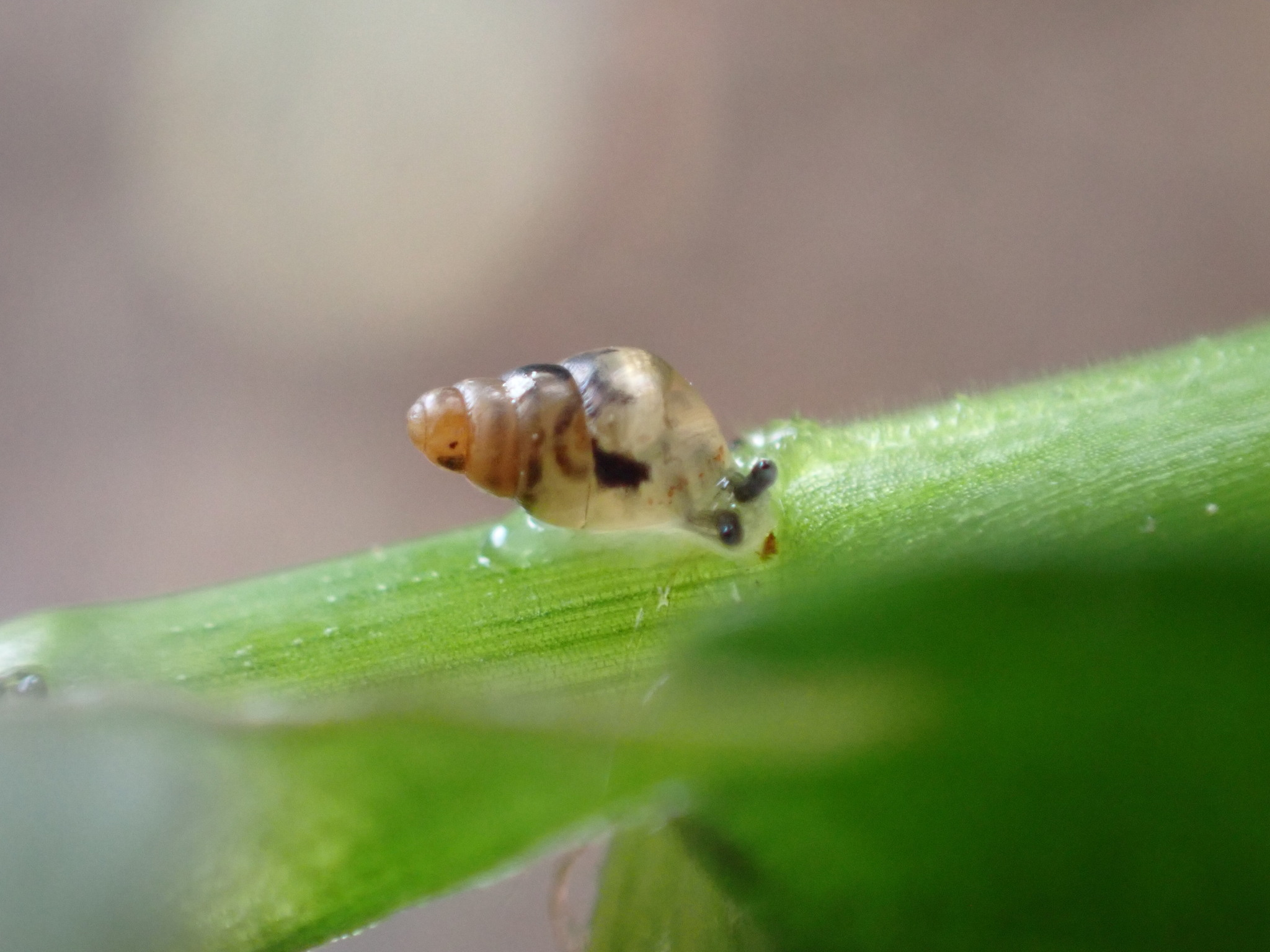

Scientific classification
- Kingdom: Animalia
- Phylum: Mollusca
- Class: Gastropoda
- Order: Stylommatophora
- Family: Achatinellidae
- Genus: Tornatellides
- Species: T. subperforatus

Binomial name
- Tornatellides subperforatus (Suter, 1909)

Synonyms
- Tornatellina subperforata Suter, 1909; Tornatellides subperforata (Suter, 1909)

= Tornatellides subperforatus =

Species of gastropod

Tornatellides subperforatus is a species of minute, air-breathing land snail, a terrestrial pulmonate gastropod mollusc or micromollusc, in the family Achatinellidae. It is one of over 50 species in the genus Tornatellides.

== Description ==
T. subperforatus has a small shell, five whorls, a vertical columbella and an inflated body whorl. The species measures 1.8 mm (0.071 in) by 2.8 mm (0.11 in).

== Taxonomy ==
The species was first described in 1909 by Henry Suter as Tornatellina subperforata.

== Distribution and habitat ==
The species is endemic to New Zealand, found in the upper North Island and the Kermadec Islands. T. subperforatus is arboreal, found on the undersides of lower leaves and in upper levels of leaf litter. It is relatively tolerant of desiccation.
