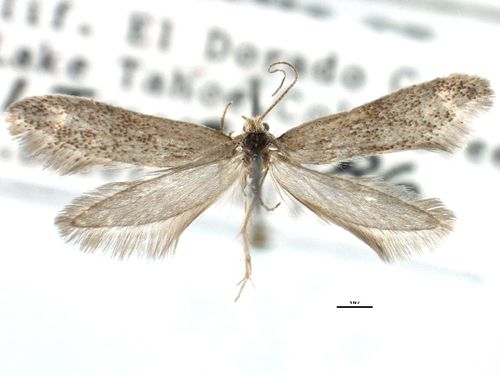

Scientific classification
- Domain: Eukaryota
- Kingdom: Animalia
- Phylum: Arthropoda
- Class: Insecta
- Order: Lepidoptera
- Family: Acanthopteroctetidae
- Genus: Acanthopteroctetes
- Species: A. tripunctata

Binomial name
- Acanthopteroctetes tripunctata Braun, 1921

= Acanthopteroctetes tripunctata =

Species of moth

Acanthopteroctetes tripunctata is a moth of the family Acanthopteroctetidae. It was described by Annette Frances Braun in 1921. It is found in the US state of Montana.

The wingspan is about 11 mm for males. The forewings are fuscous with a slight coppery luster and with three large, pale yellowish spots. The hindwings are slightly paler and the scales are narrower than those on the forewings. Adults are on wing in July, probably in one generation per year.
