= Preheterobathmia =

Preheterobathmia Temporal range: Cenomanian

Scientific classification
- Kingdom: Animalia
- Phylum: Arthropoda
- Clade: Pancrustacea
- Class: Insecta
- Order: Lepidoptera
- Family: Heterobathmiidae
- Genus: †Preheterobathmia; Mey 2024
- Species: †P. grimaldii

Binomial name
- †Preheterobathmia grimaldii Mey 2024

Extinct genus of moth

Preheterobathmia is an extinct genus of moth that belongs to the still living Heterobathmiidae family. This species is only tentatively placed in this clade because only the wings, legs and head are available for study.

This genus contains only one species which has been named Preheterobathmia grimaldii, preserved in Burmese Amber from Myanmar.
