= Prototheora drackensbergae =

Scientific classification
- Domain: Eukaryota
- Kingdom: Animalia
- Phylum: Arthropoda
- Class: Insecta
- Order: Lepidoptera
- Family: Prototheoridae
- Genus: Prototheora
- Species: P. drackensbergae

Binomial name
- Prototheora drackensbergae Davis, 1996

Species of moth

Prototheora drackensbergae is a species of moth of the family Prototheoridae. It is found in South Africa, where it is known only from the type locality east of the Drakensberg escarpment in KwaZulu-Natal.

The wingspan is about 20.3 mm.

== Etymology ==
The specific name is derived from the genitive form of the general type locality, the Drakensberg mountains.
