= Whalleyana vroni =

Scientific classification
- Domain: Eukaryota
- Kingdom: Animalia
- Phylum: Arthropoda
- Class: Insecta
- Order: Lepidoptera
- Family: Whalleyanidae
- Genus: Whalleyana
- Species: W. vroni

Binomial name
- Whalleyana vroni Viette, 1977

Species of moth

Whalleyana vroni is a species of moth in the genus Whalleyana. It was described by Pierre Viette in 1977. It is found in Madagascar.
