= Catapterix crimaea =

Scientific classification
- Kingdom: Animalia
- Phylum: Arthropoda
- Clade: Pancrustacea
- Class: Insecta
- Order: Lepidoptera
- Family: Acanthopteroctetidae
- Genus: Catapterix
- Species: C. crimaea

Binomial name
- Catapterix crimaea Zagulajev & Sinev, 1988

Species of moth

Catapterix crimaea is a moth of the family Acanthopteroctetidae and type species of the genus Catapterix. It was described in 1988 from the Crimean peninsula of Ukraine, and was in 2016 first recorded from southern France. From its description in 1988 up until the description of Catapterix tianshanica in 2016, Catapterix crimaea was considered the sole species of its genus.

== Description ==
Adult males have a wing span of 5.5 to 6.5 mm, with elongated fore- and hindwings the former of which are gold-brown in colour and the latter grey. The head is forward-projected and covered in long, golden brown hairscales, with simple antennae of about 3/5 of the forewing length. The thorax is gold-brown, the legs brown.

No female specimens have so far been described.
