= Catapterix tianshanica =

Scientific classification
- Kingdom: Animalia
- Phylum: Arthropoda
- Clade: Pancrustacea
- Class: Insecta
- Order: Lepidoptera
- Family: Acanthopteroctetidae
- Genus: Catapterix
- Species: C. tianshanica

Binomial name
- Catapterix tianshanica Mey & Rutjan, 2016

Species of moth

Catapterix tianshanica is a moth of the family Acanthopteroctetidae, currently known only from a single adult male specimen collected in Kyrgyzstan. Its host plants are unknown.

== Description ==
Catapterix tianshanica has a wingspan of 7 mm, with narrow wings that end in a pointy tip. Forewings are light brown and less pale than the grey-brown hindwings. It resembles Catapterix crimaea, from which it differs by the shape of the head capsules, the presence of lamellar scales near the eyes, and the exact shape of the genitalia.
