= Prototheora corvifera =

Scientific classification
- Kingdom: Animalia
- Phylum: Arthropoda
- Class: Insecta
- Order: Lepidoptera
- Family: Prototheoridae
- Genus: Prototheora
- Species: P. corvifera

Binomial name
- Prototheora corvifera (Meyrick, 1920)

Synonyms
- Metatheora corvifera Meyrick, 1920

Species of moth

Prototheora corvifera is a species of moth of the family Prototheoridae. It is found in South Africa, where it is known only from the top of Table Mountain.

The wingspan is 20–23 mm. Adults have been recorded from the beginning of February to mid-March.
