= Prototheora cooperi =

Scientific classification
- Kingdom: Animalia
- Phylum: Arthropoda
- Clade: Pancrustacea
- Class: Insecta
- Order: Lepidoptera
- Family: Prototheoridae
- Genus: Prototheora
- Species: P. cooperi

Binomial name
- Prototheora cooperi Janse, 1942

Species of moth

Prototheora cooperi is a species of moth of the family Prototheoridae. It is found in South Africa, where it has been found at three widespread locations in Cape Province, all characterized largely by fynbos vegetation within the Capensis region. It was found most commonly at a rather xeric site north of Oudtshoorn in the Swartberg mountains.

The wingspan is 16.6–19 mm. Adults have been recorded in March.
