= Acanthopteroctetes nepticuloides =

Scientific classification
- Kingdom: Animalia
- Phylum: Arthropoda
- Class: Insecta
- Order: Lepidoptera
- Family: Acanthopteroctetidae
- Genus: Acanthopteroctetes
- Species: A. nepticuloides

Binomial name
- Acanthopteroctetes nepticuloides W. Mey, 2011

Species of moth

Acanthopteroctetes nepticuloides is a species of moth in the family Acanthopteroctetidae. It is found in South Africa, the first species of its genus to be found in Africa. Its host plant is possibly from the genus Phylica.

It has a wingspan of 5 mm (0.2 in), and forewing length of 2 mm (0.08 in). Its thorax is brown and its wings are somewhat shiny.

== Etymology ==
The name nepticuloides was inspired by the family Nepticulidae, due to the moths very small size; a key characteristic of Nepticulidae.
