= Prototheora quadricornis =

Scientific classification
- Kingdom: Animalia
- Phylum: Arthropoda
- Class: Insecta
- Order: Lepidoptera
- Family: Prototheoridae
- Genus: Prototheora
- Species: P. quadricornis

Binomial name
- Prototheora quadricornis Meyrick, 1920

Species of moth

Prototheora quadricornis is a species of moth of the family Prototheoridae. It is found in South Africa.
