= Cyclotorna monocentra =

Scientific classification
- Domain: Eukaryota
- Kingdom: Animalia
- Phylum: Arthropoda
- Class: Insecta
- Order: Lepidoptera
- Family: Cyclotornidae
- Genus: Cyclotorna
- Species: C. monocentra

Binomial name
- Cyclotorna monocentra Meyrick, 1907

Species of moth

Cyclotorna monocentra is a moth of the family Cyclotornidae. It is found in Australia.
