= Limenarchis zonodeta =

Scientific classification
- Kingdom: Animalia
- Phylum: Arthropoda
- Class: Insecta
- Order: Lepidoptera
- Family: Gelechiidae
- Genus: Limenarchis
- Species: L. zonodeta

Binomial name
- Limenarchis zonodeta Meyrick, 1926

Species of moth

Limenarchis zonodeta is a moth in the family Gelechiidae. It was described by Edward Meyrick in 1926. It is found on New Ireland in Papua New Guinea.

The wingspan is about 18 mm. The forewings are dark purplish fuscous. The hindwings are dark fuscous.
