= Prototheora angolae =

Scientific classification
- Kingdom: Animalia
- Phylum: Arthropoda
- Class: Insecta
- Order: Lepidoptera
- Family: Prototheoridae
- Genus: Prototheora
- Species: P. angolae

Binomial name
- Prototheora angolae Davis, 1996

Species of moth

Prototheora angolae is a species of moth of the family Prototheoridae. It is found in Angola, where it known only from the type locality which is located in central Angola.

The wingspan is about 20 mm. Adults have been recorded in early November.

== Etymology ==
The specific name is derived from the genitive form of the country of origin, Angola.
