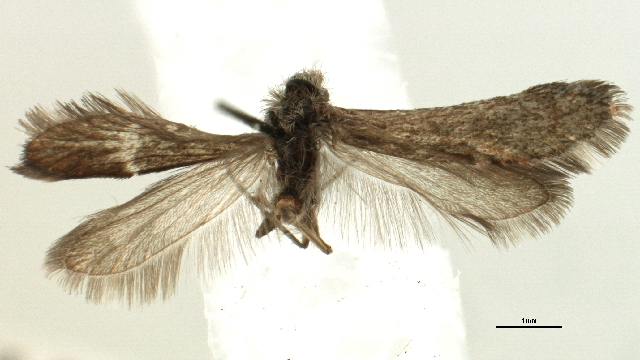

Scientific classification
- Domain: Eukaryota
- Kingdom: Animalia
- Phylum: Arthropoda
- Class: Insecta
- Order: Lepidoptera
- Family: Heterobathmiidae
- Genus: Heterobathmia
- Species: H. pseuderiocrania

Binomial name
- Heterobathmia pseuderiocrania Kristensen & Nielsen, 1979

= Heterobathmia pseuderiocrania =

Primitive moth species

Heterobathmia pseuderiocrania, the southern beech moth, is a species of moth belonging to the family Heterobathmiidae. It was first described by Niels Peder Kristensen and Ebbe Nielsen in 1979. It is found in temperate South America, including Argentina.

The mouthparts are primitive and well adapted for collecting and grinding pollen of Nothofagus species. The five piece maxillary palps display specialized structures which enable the collection of pollen.
