= Prototheora serruligera =

Scientific classification
- Kingdom: Animalia
- Phylum: Arthropoda
- Class: Insecta
- Order: Lepidoptera
- Family: Prototheoridae
- Genus: Prototheora
- Species: P. serruligera

Binomial name
- Prototheora serruligera Meyrick, 1920

Species of moth

Prototheora serruligera is a species of moth of the family Prototheoridae. It is found in South Africa.

The wingspan is 21–22 mm. Adults have been recorded from January to mid-March.
