= Heterobathmia valvifer =

Scientific classification
- Domain: Eukaryota
- Kingdom: Animalia
- Phylum: Arthropoda
- Class: Insecta
- Order: Lepidoptera
- Family: Heterobathmiidae
- Genus: Heterobathmia
- Species: H. valvifer

Binomial name
- Heterobathmia valvifer Kristensen & Nielsen, 1998

Primitive moth species

Heterobathmia valvifer is a moth of the family Heterobathmiidae. It was described by Kristensen and Nielsen in 1998. It is found in temperate South America.
