= Simaethistis =

Scientific classification
- Kingdom: Animalia
- Phylum: Arthropoda
- Class: Insecta
- Order: Lepidoptera
- Family: Simaethistidae
- Genus: Simaethistis; Hampson, 1896

Genus of moths

Simaethistis is a genus of moths in the superfamily Simaethistoidea. It was described by George Hampson in 1896.

== Species ==
- Simaethistis leechi South, 1901 (China)
- Simaethistis tricolor Butler, 1889 (India)
