= Catapterix =

Scientific classification
- Kingdom: Animalia
- Phylum: Arthropoda
- Clade: Pancrustacea
- Class: Insecta
- Order: Lepidoptera
- Family: Acanthopteroctetidae
- Genus: Catapterix; Zagulajev & Sinev, 1988

Species
- Catapterix crimaea Catapterix tianshanica

Genus of moths

Catapterix is a small genus of moths in the family Acanthopteroctetidae, with species occurring in Europe and Central Asia. The genus was previously considered monotypic, with Catapterix crimaea as its sole known species, until the formal description of Catapterix tianshanica in 2016.

== Distribution ==
The type species, C. crimaea, is known from the Crimean Peninsula in Ukraine and from southern France, whereas C. tianshanica is described from Kyrgyzstan.

== Taxonomy ==
The genus was originally placed in its own family, Catapterigidae, which is now considered a synonym of Acanthopteroctetidae.
