= Cyclotorna diplocentra =

Scientific classification
- Domain: Eukaryota
- Kingdom: Animalia
- Phylum: Arthropoda
- Class: Insecta
- Order: Lepidoptera
- Family: Cyclotornidae
- Genus: Cyclotorna
- Species: C. diplocentra

Binomial name
- Cyclotorna diplocentra Turner, 1913

Species of moth

Cyclotorna diplocentra is a moth of the family Cyclotornidae. It is found in Australia, including New South Wales and Queensland.

== Original description ==
female 30 mm. Head, thorax, and legs brownish-fuscous, finely irrorated with whitish. Antennae fuscous. Abdomen brownish fuscous. Forewings elongate-oval, costa rather strongly arched, apex rounded, termen obliquely rounded, dorsum strongly arched before middle; brownish-grey, finely irrorated with whitish, and with sparsely scattered dark fuscous scales; two roundish dark fuscous discal spots; first above 2/3 dorsum, second larger, beneath 2/3 costa; cilia grey, with some whitish irroration. Hindwings and cilia fuscous. Type in Coll. Turner. Q.: Brisbane; one specimen.

— Original description by Alfred Jefferis Turner
