= Aenigmatineidae =

Scientific classification
- Kingdom: Animalia
- Phylum: Arthropoda
- Class: Insecta
- Order: Lepidoptera
- Suborder: Glossata
- Family: Aenigmatineidae; Kristensen & Edwards, 2015
- Genus: Aenigmatinea; Kristensen & Edwards, 2015
- Species: A. glatzella

Binomial name
- Aenigmatinea glatzella Kristensen & Edwards, 2015

Family of moths

Aenigmatineidae is a family of Lepidoptera, moths discovered on Kangaroo Island in South Australia by Dr Richard Glatz. The family is based on a single species discovered in 2015, Aenigmatinea glatzella, commonly known as the enigma moth. The larvae feed on conifers by mining the stem of Callitris plants in the cypress family. The adult has highly reduced mouthparts but its position in the Glossata containing the more familiar moths-with-tongues is confirmed by morphological and DNA sequence similarity. The group is best treated as a sister of the family Neopseustidae.

== Phylogeny ==
A phylogenetic analysis finds Aenigmatineidae as sister to family Neopseustidae in a clade with Acanthopteroctetidae. This clade is sister to the Heteroneura, which contains the large majority of moths and the butterflies.

- Lepidoptera
  - - Micropterigidae
    - Agathiphagidae
  - - Heterobathmiidae
    - Glossata
      - - Lophocoronidae
        - Exoporia
      - - Eriocraniidae
        - - - Acanthopteroctetidae
            - - Aenigmatineidae
              - Neopseustidae
          - Heteroneura
