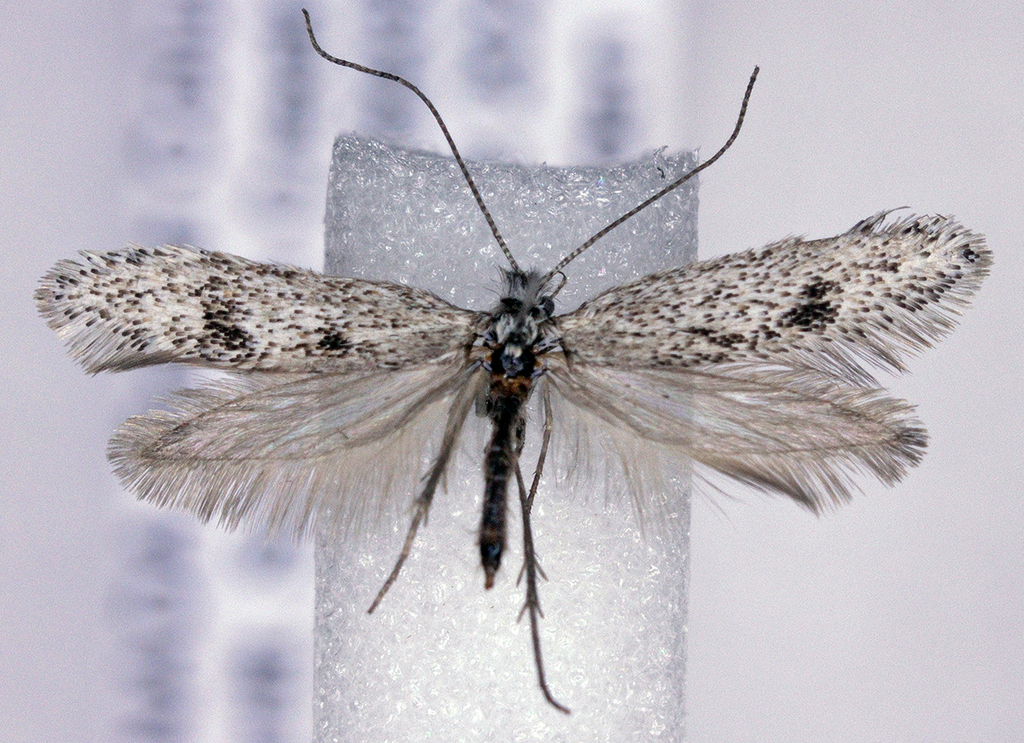

Scientific classification
- Domain: Eukaryota
- Kingdom: Animalia
- Phylum: Arthropoda
- Class: Insecta
- Order: Lepidoptera
- Family: Acanthopteroctetidae
- Genus: Acanthopteroctetes
- Species: A. bimaculata

Binomial name
- Acanthopteroctetes bimaculata Davis, 1969

= Acanthopteroctetes bimaculata =

Species of moth

Acanthopteroctetes bimaculata is a moth of the family Acanthopteroctetidae. It was described by Davis in 1969. It is found in north-eastern Oregon and east-central California.

The wingspan is 14.5–16 mm for males and 15 mm for males. The forewings are mostly white, with a somewhat irregular suffusion of pale brown to fuscous and two irregularly shaped distinct spots of fuscous. The hindwings are thinly scaled and pale brownish. Adults are on wing from May to mid July in one generation per year.
