= Prototheora monoglossa =

Scientific classification
- Kingdom: Animalia
- Phylum: Arthropoda
- Class: Insecta
- Order: Lepidoptera
- Family: Prototheoridae
- Genus: Prototheora
- Species: P. monoglossa

Binomial name
- Prototheora monoglossa Meyrick, 1924

Species of moth

Prototheora monoglossa is a species of moth of the family Prototheoridae. It is found in South Africa.
