= Prototheora biserrata =

Scientific classification
- Domain: Eukaryota
- Kingdom: Animalia
- Phylum: Arthropoda
- Class: Insecta
- Order: Lepidoptera
- Family: Prototheoridae
- Genus: Prototheora
- Species: P. biserrata

Binomial name
- Prototheora biserrata Davis, 1996

Species of moth

Prototheora biserrata is a species of moth of the family Prototheoridae. It is found in South Africa, where it known from only one and possibly two localities in the southern Cape Province. The holotype was collected in the wet, temperate Groenkop forest near George. A second specimen, possibly the female of the same species, was found at Camps Bay, a coastal fynbos habitat immediately south of Cape Town.

The wingspan is about 18 mm. Adults have been recorded in early March.
