= Limenarchis pullata =

Scientific classification
- Domain: Eukaryota
- Kingdom: Animalia
- Phylum: Arthropoda
- Class: Insecta
- Order: Lepidoptera
- Family: Gelechiidae
- Genus: Limenarchis
- Species: L. pullata

Binomial name
- Limenarchis pullata Bradley, 1961

Species of moth

Limenarchis pullata is a moth in the family Gelechiidae. It was described by John David Bradley in 1961. It is found on Guadalcanal in the Solomon Islands.
