= Cyclotorna ementita =

Scientific classification
- Domain: Eukaryota
- Kingdom: Animalia
- Phylum: Arthropoda
- Class: Insecta
- Order: Lepidoptera
- Family: Cyclotornidae
- Genus: Cyclotorna
- Species: C. ementita

Binomial name
- Cyclotorna ementita Meyrick, 1921

Species of moth

Cyclotorna ementita is a moth of the family Cyclotornidae. It is found in Australia.
