= Hyposmocoma molluscivora =

Scientific classification
- Kingdom: Animalia
- Phylum: Arthropoda
- Clade: Pancrustacea
- Class: Insecta
- Order: Lepidoptera
- Family: Cosmopterigidae
- Genus: Hyposmocoma
- Species: H. molluscivora

Binomial name
- Hyposmocoma molluscivora (Rubinoff, 2005)

Species of moth

Hyposmocoma molluscivora is a Hawaiian moth whose larvae are predators, capturing snails in their silk, much like a hunting spider's web, and then crawling inside the snail's shell to eat it alive. It has been called the snail-eating caterpillar or the flesh-eating caterpillar, though no common name has been widely prescribed to it.

They are case bearing moths, spinning a loose shell of their own which they carry around with them as protection, like bagworms. The specific snails they eat are of the Tornatellides genus.

The caterpillars, which live exclusively on the islands of Maui and Molokai, are about 0.3 inches (8 mm) long, and sometimes decorate their silk case with actual snail shells, perhaps as camouflage.

There are about 200 species of Lepidoptera (moths or butterflies) whose larvae are predatory, out of 150,000 known Lepidopteran species overall. However, this is one of the four known species that eat snails.
