= Prototheora merga =

Scientific classification
- Domain: Eukaryota
- Kingdom: Animalia
- Phylum: Arthropoda
- Class: Insecta
- Order: Lepidoptera
- Family: Prototheoridae
- Genus: Prototheora
- Species: P. merga

Binomial name
- Prototheora merga Davis, 1996

Species of moth

Prototheora merga is a species of moth of the family Prototheoridae. It is found in South Africa, where it is only known from the Schoemanspoort in the Cape Province.

The wingspan is about 18 mm. The only known adult was collected in mid-March.
