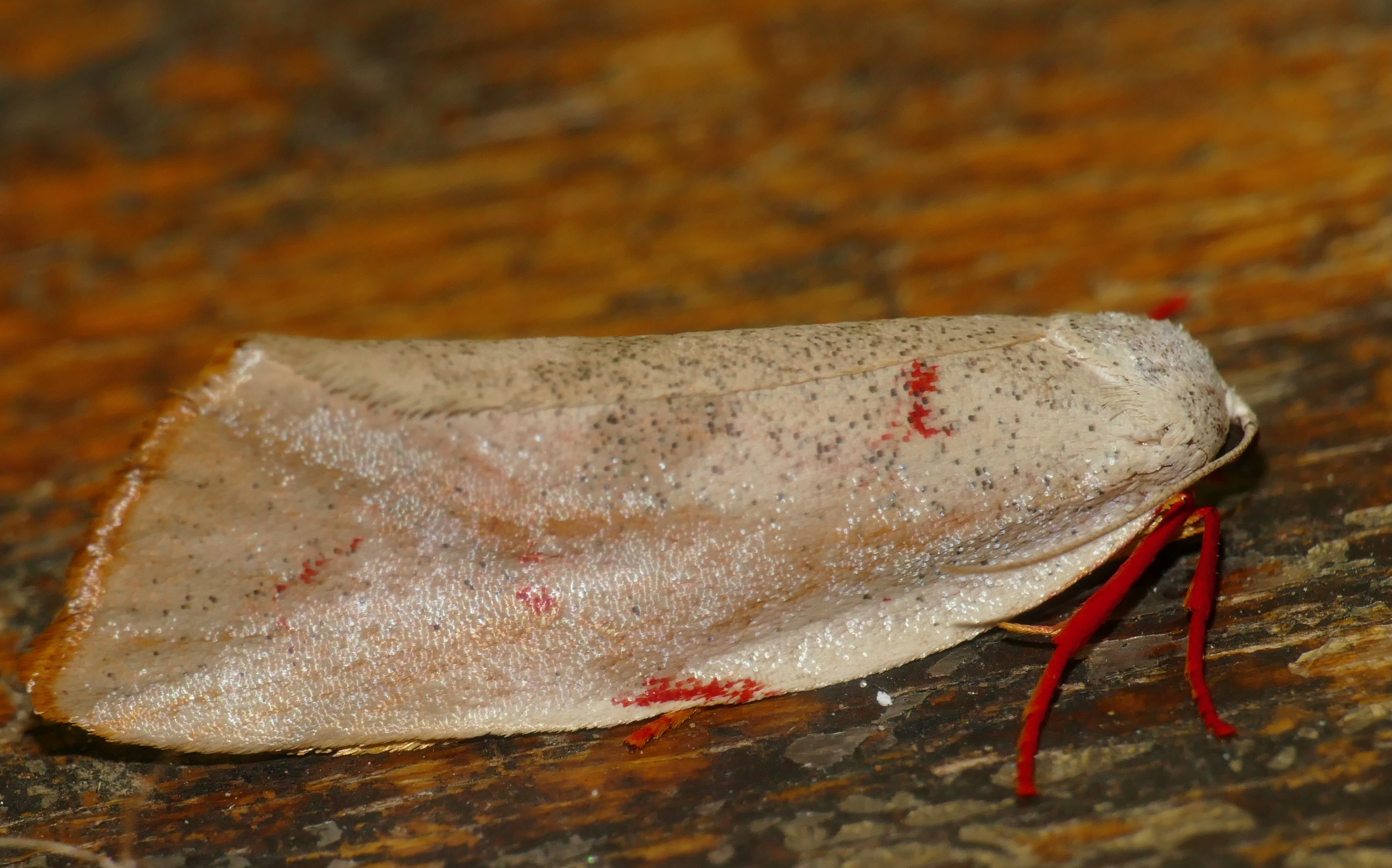

Scientific classification
- Kingdom: Animalia
- Phylum: Arthropoda
- Clade: Pancrustacea
- Class: Insecta
- Order: Lepidoptera
- Clade: Apoditrysia
- Clade: Obtectomera
- Superfamily: Hyblaeoidea
- Family: Prodidactidae; Epstein & Brown, 2003
- Genus: Prodidactis; Meyrick, 1921
- Species: P. mystica

Binomial name
- Prodidactis mystica (Meyrick, 1918)

= Prodidactis =

Genus of moths

Prodidactis mystica is an enigmatic Pyraloidea-like moth from southern Africa which has been placed in its own family, Prodidactidae and which belongs in the lepidopteran group Apoditrysia. Its closest relative amongst this large group of Lepidoptera is uncertain, but morphological and molecular evidence suggests placement of Prodidactidae in Hyblaeoidea. The larval food plant is Nuxia congesta (Stilbaceae).
