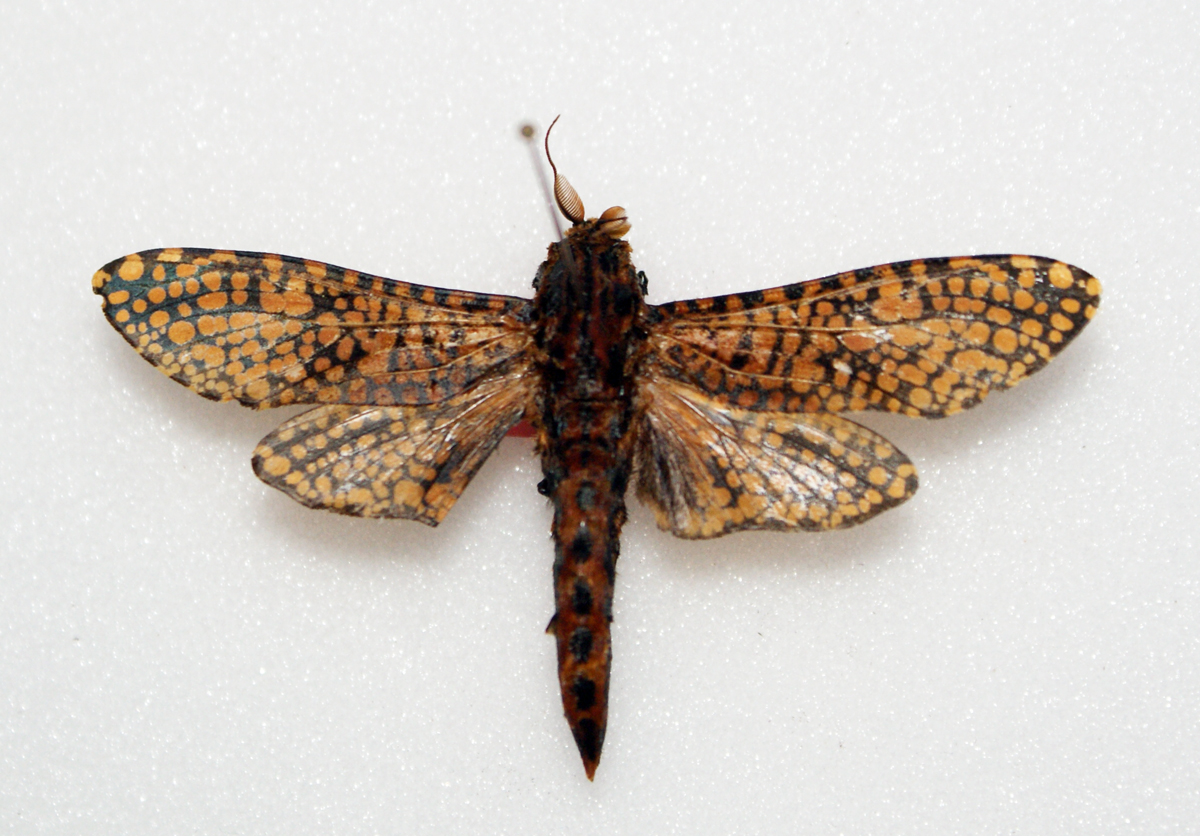
- Cossidae

Scientific classification
- Domain: Eukaryota
- Kingdom: Animalia
- Phylum: Arthropoda
- Class: Insecta
- Order: Lepidoptera
- Infraorder: Heteroneura
- Clade: Eulepidoptera
- Clade: Ditrysia
- Clade: Apoditrysia
- Superfamily: Cossoidea; Leach, [1815]

Families
- Cossidae - carpenter moths Dudgeoneidae - dudgeon carpenter moths and see text

Diversity
- about 676 species

= Cossoidea =

Superfamily of moths

Cossoidea is the superfamily of moths that includes carpenter moths and relatives. Like their likely sister group Sesioidea they are internal feeders and have spiny pupae with moveable segments to allow them to extrude out of their exit holes in stems and trunks during emergence of the adult (Edwards et al., 1999).

The Limacodidae are sometimes included here as a third family. But the Sesioidea, and perhaps the Zygaenoidea and/or Tortricoidea, seem to be close relatives of the Cossoidea, and the relation of these – in particular the Zygaenoidea – to the Limacodidae requires further study.

== Sources ==
- Firefly Encyclopedia of Insects and Spiders, edited by Christopher O'Toole, ISBN 1-55297-612-2, 2002
