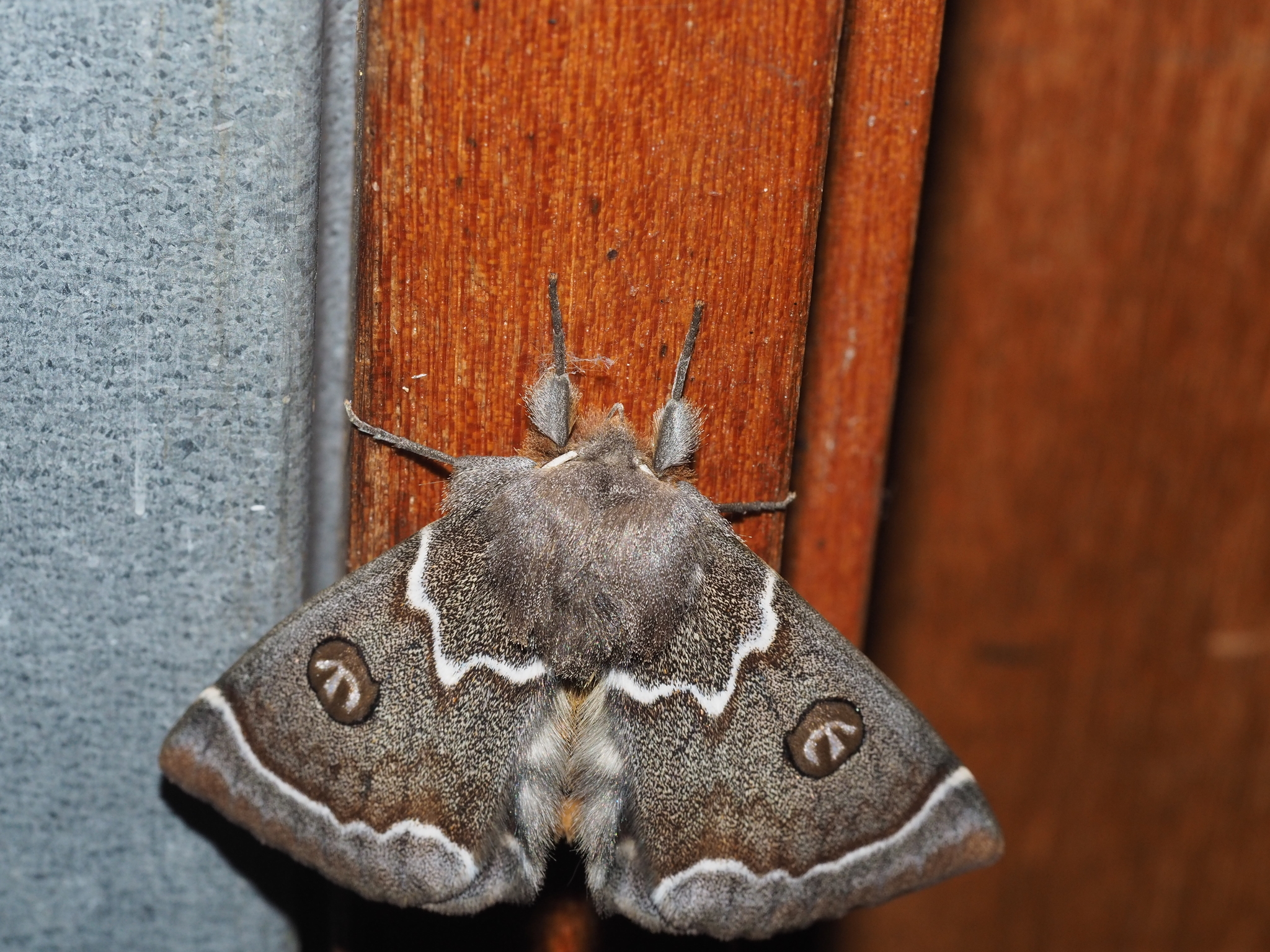
- Adult
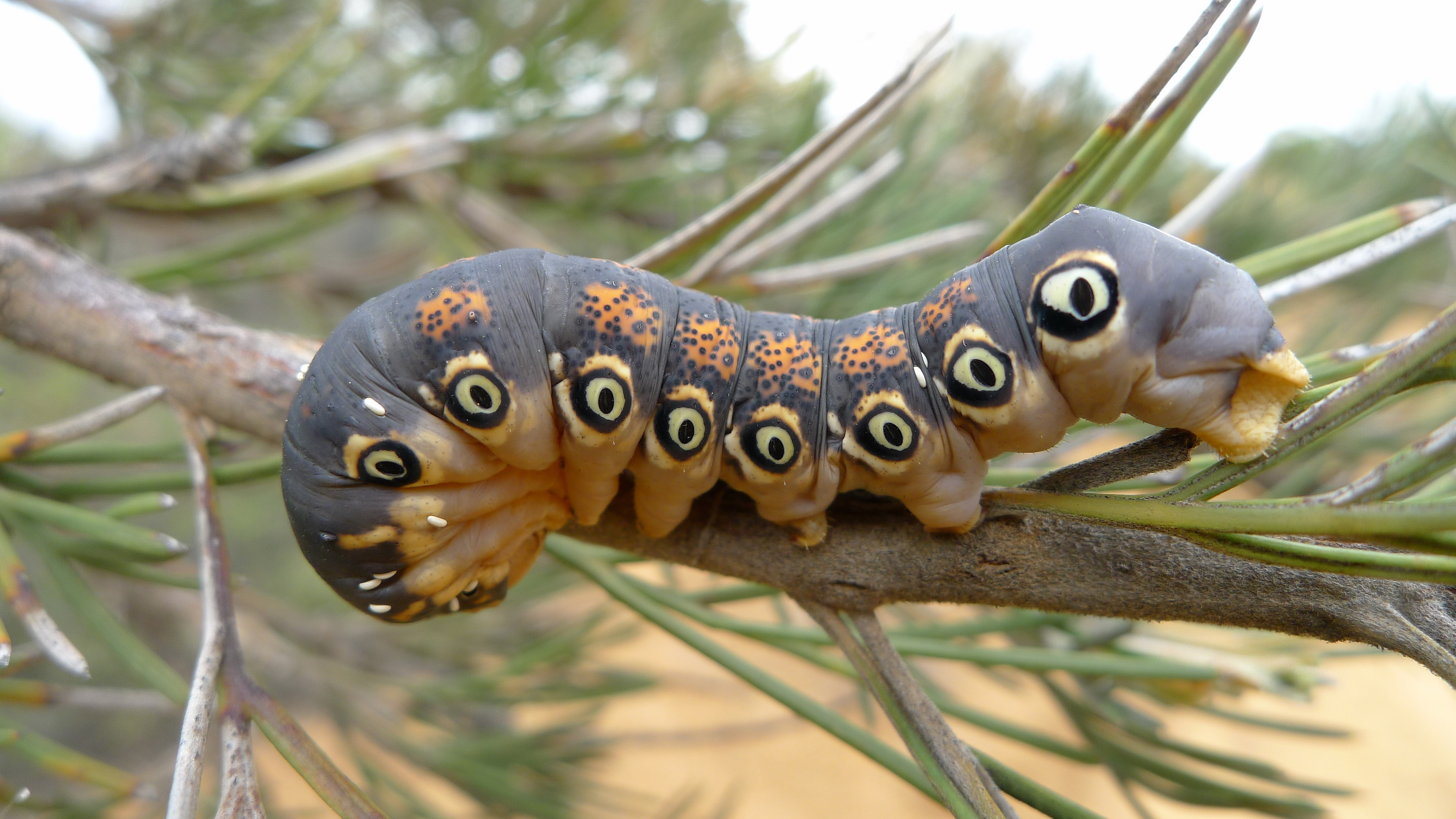
- Carthaea saturnioides larva, probably on Grevillea hookeriana, in Boyagin Nature Reserve, Western Australia

Scientific classification
- Kingdom: Animalia
- Phylum: Arthropoda
- Clade: Pancrustacea
- Class: Insecta
- Order: Lepidoptera
- Superfamily: Bombycoidea
- Family: Carthaeidae; Common, 1966
- Genus: Carthaea; Walker, 1858
- Species: C. saturnioides

Binomial name
- Carthaea saturnioides Walker, 1858

= Dryandra moth =

Species of moth

The dryandra moth (Carthaea saturnioides) is a species of moth that is considered to be the sole member of the family Carthaeidae. Its closest relatives are the Saturniidae and it bears a resemblance to many species of that family, bearing prominent eyespots on all wings. The common name is derived from the Dryandra shrubs of the genus Banksia, on which the larva of this species feed, and is hence restricted to the south-west of Western Australia where these shrubs grow. Other Grevillea shrubs may also be used as host plants.

== Description ==
The larva (caterpillar) of this species is grey on the dorsal side, and yellow on the ventral side. Along the prolegs there is a line of clear markings, as well as markings in the form of an eye, following the line of spiracles. In the adult, each wing presents a large eyespot. The eyespots on the hindwings are distinct, whereas the eyespots on the forewings are smaller and often duller. These eyespots are visible on both sides of the wing. The apex and outer margin of the forewing are darker than the basal region. The wing venation is similar to that of the Saturniidae. The wingspan ranges from 80 to 100 millimetres (3.1 to 3.9 in).

== Behaviour ==
The larvae are diurnal, whereas the adults fly only at night, from October to December. When disturbed, adult moths tend to lower the head and abdomen, bringing the forewings forward to expose the large spots on the hindwings, which oscillate from side to side, giving the aggressor the impression that it is being watched by two large eyes (such as an owl), in an attempt to cause the aggressor to refrain from attacking.
