= Prototheora =

Scientific classification
- Kingdom: Animalia
- Phylum: Arthropoda
- Clade: Pancrustacea
- Class: Insecta
- Order: Lepidoptera
- Superfamily: Hepialoidea
- Family: Prototheoridae; Meyrick, 1917
- Genus: Prototheora; Meyrick, 1917

Diversity
- 12–13 species

Synonyms
- Metatheora Meyrick, 1919

Genus of moths

Prototheora is a genus of moths. It is the only genus of the Prototheoridae, or the African primitive ghost moths, a family of insects in the lepidopteran order, contained in the superfamily Hepialoidea. These moths are endemic to Southern Africa.

== Diversity and distribution ==
Members of the genus Prototheora are found in South Africa (Kristensen, 1999: 60; Nielsen et al., 2000), Angola (Prototheora angolae) and the Mulanje Massif of Malawi (Davis, 2001). See also revisions by Janse (1942) and Davis (1996).

== List of species ==
- Prototheora parachlora (Meyrick, 1919) (originally in Metatheora)
  - =Prototheora paraglossa; Janse, 1942
- Prototheora petrosema Meyrick, 1917
- Prototheora monoglossa Meyrick, 1924
- Prototheora corvifera (Meyrick, 1920) (originally in Metatheora)
- Prototheora merga Davis, 1996
- Prototheora quadricornis Meyrick, 1920
- Prototheora biserrata Davis, 1996
- Prototheora serruligera Meyrick, 1920
- Prototheora cooperi Janse, 1942
- Prototheora geniculata Davis, 1996
- Prototheora drackensbergae Davis, 1996
- Prototheora angolae Davis, 1996
- Prototheora malawiensis Davis, 2001

== Sources ==
- Common Name Index
