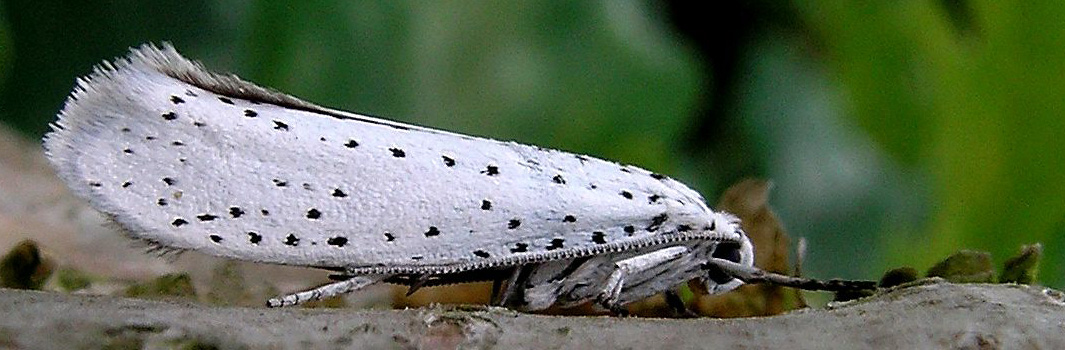
- Ermine moth, Yponomeuta evonymella

Scientific classification
- Kingdom: Animalia
- Phylum: Arthropoda
- Class: Insecta
- Order: Lepidoptera
- Clade: Ditrysia
- Superfamily: Yponomeutoidea

Families
- See text

Diversity
- Over 1,500 species of micromoths

= Yponomeutoidea =

Superfamily of moths

Yponomeutoidea is a superfamily of ermine moths and relatives. There are about 1,800 species of Yponomeutoids worldwide, most of them known to come from temperate regions. This superfamily is one of the earliest groups to evolve external feeding and to colonize herbs in addition to shrubs and trees.

== Families ==
The family composition of Yponomeutoidea has varied over time, with a 2013 study assigning eleven families:

- Argyresthiidae
- Attevidae
- Bedelliidae
- Glyphipterigidae
- Heliodinidae
- Lyonetiidae
- Plutellidae
- Praydidae
- Scythropiidae
- Yponomeutidae
- Ypsolophidae

== Etymology ==
The word Yponomeutoidea comes from the Ancient Greek ὑπό (ypo) meaning under and νομός (nomós) meaning food or dwelling, thus "feeding secretly, or burrow".

== Sources ==
- Firefly Encyclopedia of Insects and Spiders, edited by Christopher O'Toole, ISBN 1-55297-612-2, 2002
- van Nieukirken et al., 2011. Order Lepidoptera Linnaeus, 1758. In:Zhang, Z.-Q. (ed.) Animal Biodiversity: an outline of higher-level classification and survey of taxonomic richness. Zootaxa 3148: 212-221.
