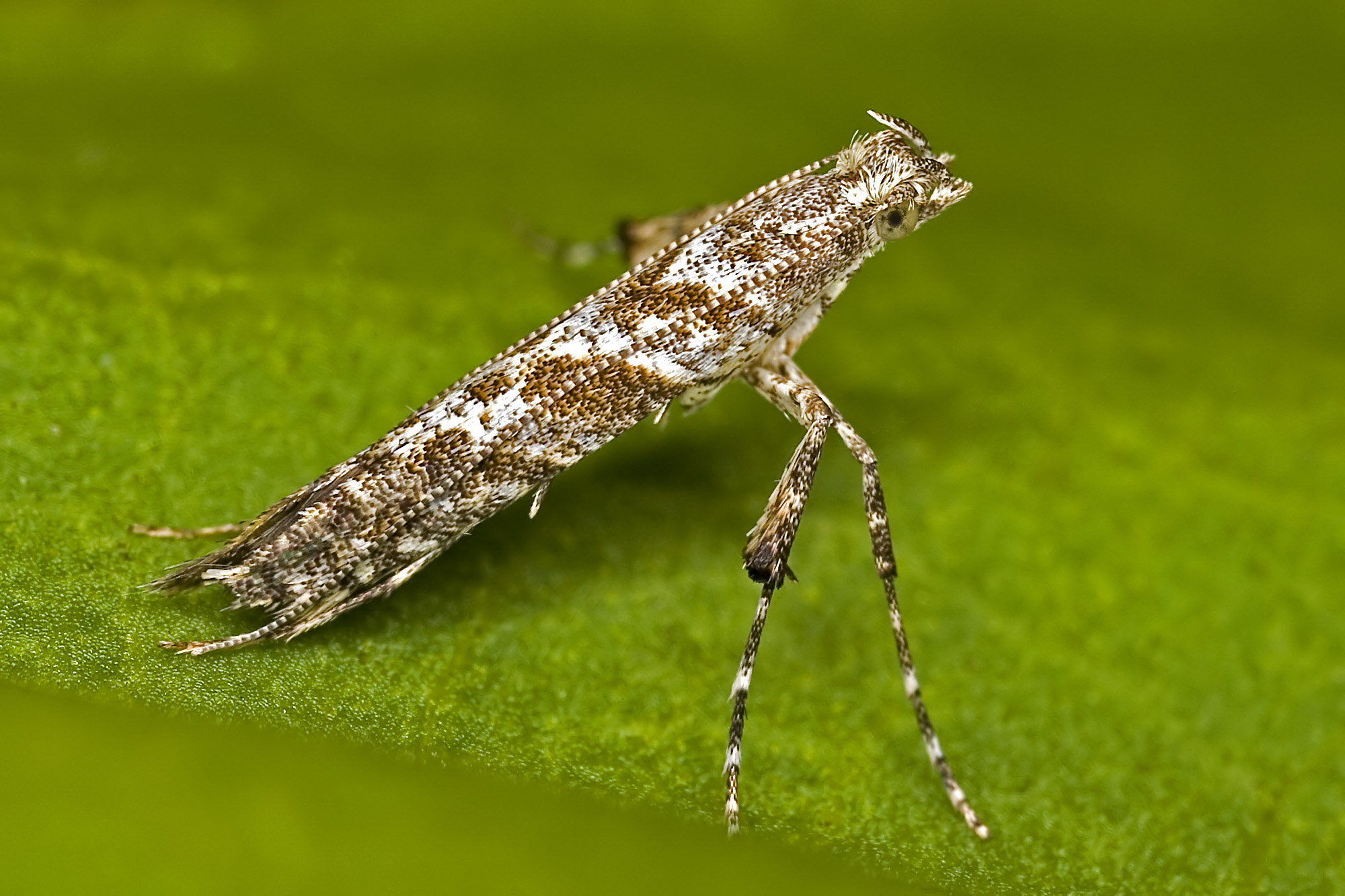
- Caloptilia cuculipennella (Hübner, 1796)

Scientific classification
- Domain: Eukaryota
- Kingdom: Animalia
- Phylum: Arthropoda
- Class: Insecta
- Order: Lepidoptera
- Clade: Ditrysia
- Superfamily: Gracillarioidea

Families
- Roeslerstammiidae; Douglasiidae; Bucculatricidae; Gracillariidae

Diversity
- Over 2300 species

= Gracillarioidea =

Superfamily of moths

Gracillarioidea is a large superfamily containing four families of insects in the order Lepidoptera. These generally small moths are miners in plant tissue as caterpillars. There are about 113 described genera distributed worldwide, the most commonly encountered of which are leaf miners in the family Gracillariidae.
