= Anomoses =

Anomoses hylecoetes

Scientific classification
- Kingdom: Animalia
- Phylum: Arthropoda
- Clade: Pancrustacea
- Class: Insecta
- Order: Lepidoptera
- Clade: Myoglossata
- Clade: Neolepidoptera
- Infraorder: Exoporia
- Superfamily: Hepialoidea
- Family: Anomosetidae; Turner, 1922
- Genus: Anomoses; Turner, 1916
- Species: A. hylecoetes

Binomial name
- Anomoses hylecoetes Turner, 1916

Moth family containing a single species

Anomoses hylecoetes is a species of primitive hepialoid moth endemic to Queensland and New South Wales, Australia . It is the only species in its genus Anomoses, which is the only genus in the family Anomosetidae.
