= Cyclotorna =

Scientific classification
- Kingdom: Animalia
- Phylum: Arthropoda
- Clade: Pancrustacea
- Class: Insecta
- Order: Lepidoptera
- Superfamily: Zygaenoidea
- Family: Cyclotornidae
- Genus: Cyclotorna; Meyrick, 1907

Species
- Cyclotorna diplocentra Turner, 1913; Cyclotorna egena Meyrick, 1912; Cyclotorna ementita Meyrick, 1921; Cyclotorna experta Meyrick, 1912; Cyclotorna monocentra Meyrick, 1907

Genus of moths

Cyclotorna is a genus of moths, the sole one of family Cyclotornidae, with five recognized species, all endemic to Australia. This family and the closely related Epipyropidae are unique among the Lepidoptera in that the larvae are ectoparasites, the hosts in this case typically being leafhoppers, sometimes scale insects. The larvae of cyclotornids, however, leave the hemipteran host and become predatory on the brood in ant nests, apparently using chemical cues to induce the ants to carry the larvae into the ant nest.
