= Neotheora =

Scientific classification
- Kingdom: Animalia
- Phylum: Arthropoda
- Clade: Pancrustacea
- Class: Insecta
- Order: Lepidoptera
- Clade: Neolepidoptera
- Infraorder: Exoporia
- Superfamily: Hepialoidea
- Family: Neotheoridae
- Genus: Neotheora; Kristensen, 1978
- Species: N. chiloides

Binomial name
- Neotheora chiloides Kristensen, 1978

Genus of moths

Neotheoridae, or Amazonian primitive ghost moths, is a primitive family of insects in the lepidopteran order containing a single genus and species, Neotheora chiloides.

== Distribution ==
Neotheora chiloides is known from a single female collected in Mato Grosso, Brazil (Kristensen, 1999: 60; Nielsen et al., 2000).

== Sources ==
- Common Name Index
