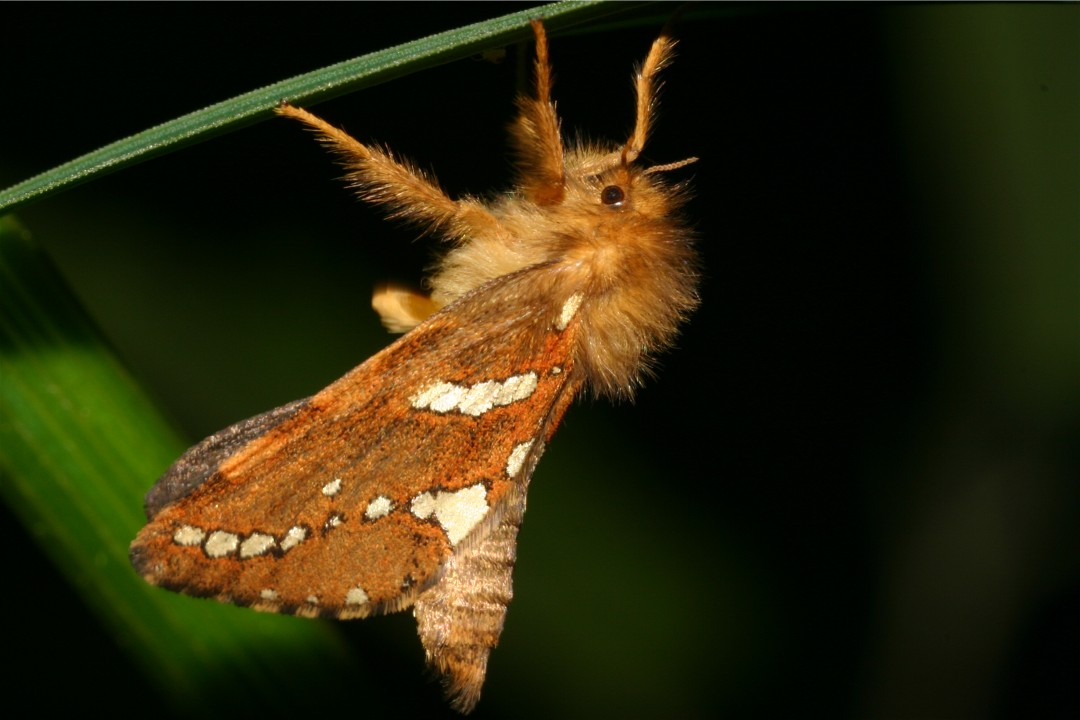
- Phymatopus hecta

Scientific classification
- Domain: Eukaryota
- Kingdom: Animalia
- Phylum: Arthropoda
- Class: Insecta
- Order: Lepidoptera
- Infraorder: Exoporia
- Superfamily: Hepialoidea; Stephens, 1829

Families
- Anomosetidae; Neotheoridae; Prototheoridae; Palaeosetidae; Hepialidae

Diversity
- 67 genera and at least 617 species

= Hepialoidea =

Superfamily of moths

The Hepialoidea are the superfamily of "ghost moths" and "swift moths".

== Fossils ==
Fossil Hepialoidea appear to be few. Prohepialus (possibly Hepialidae) has been described from the about 35-million-year-old Bembridge marls of Isle of Wight. A mid-Miocene hepialoid fossil is also known from China.
