= Whalleyana =

Scientific classification
- Domain: Eukaryota
- Kingdom: Animalia
- Phylum: Arthropoda
- Class: Insecta
- Order: Lepidoptera
- Clade: Ditrysia
- Clade: Apoditrysia
- Clade: Obtectomera
- Superfamily: Whalleyanoidea; Minet, 1991
- Family: Whalleyanidae; Minet, 1991
- Genus: Whalleyana; Viette, 1977

Species
- Whalleyana toni Viette, 1977; Whalleyana vroni Viette, 1977

Diversity
- 2 species

Genus of moths

Whalleyana is an enigmatic genus of moths in the lepidopteran group Obtectomera, endemic to Madagascar. The genus contains two species, whose biology are unknown. The genus had been placed in the picture-winged leaf moths, (Thyrididae), but then was placed in its own family (Minet, 1991), and later elevated to its own superfamily (Dugdale et al., 1999: 229-230); see also Fänger (2004). The genus was named after Paul E. S. Whalley, a British entomologist. Genomic studies have found them to be most closely related to Callidulidae, and it is suggested that they should be placed in Calliduloidea.

== Sources ==
- Firefly Encyclopedia of Insects and Spiders, edited by Christopher O'Toole, ISBN 1-55297-612-2, 2002
