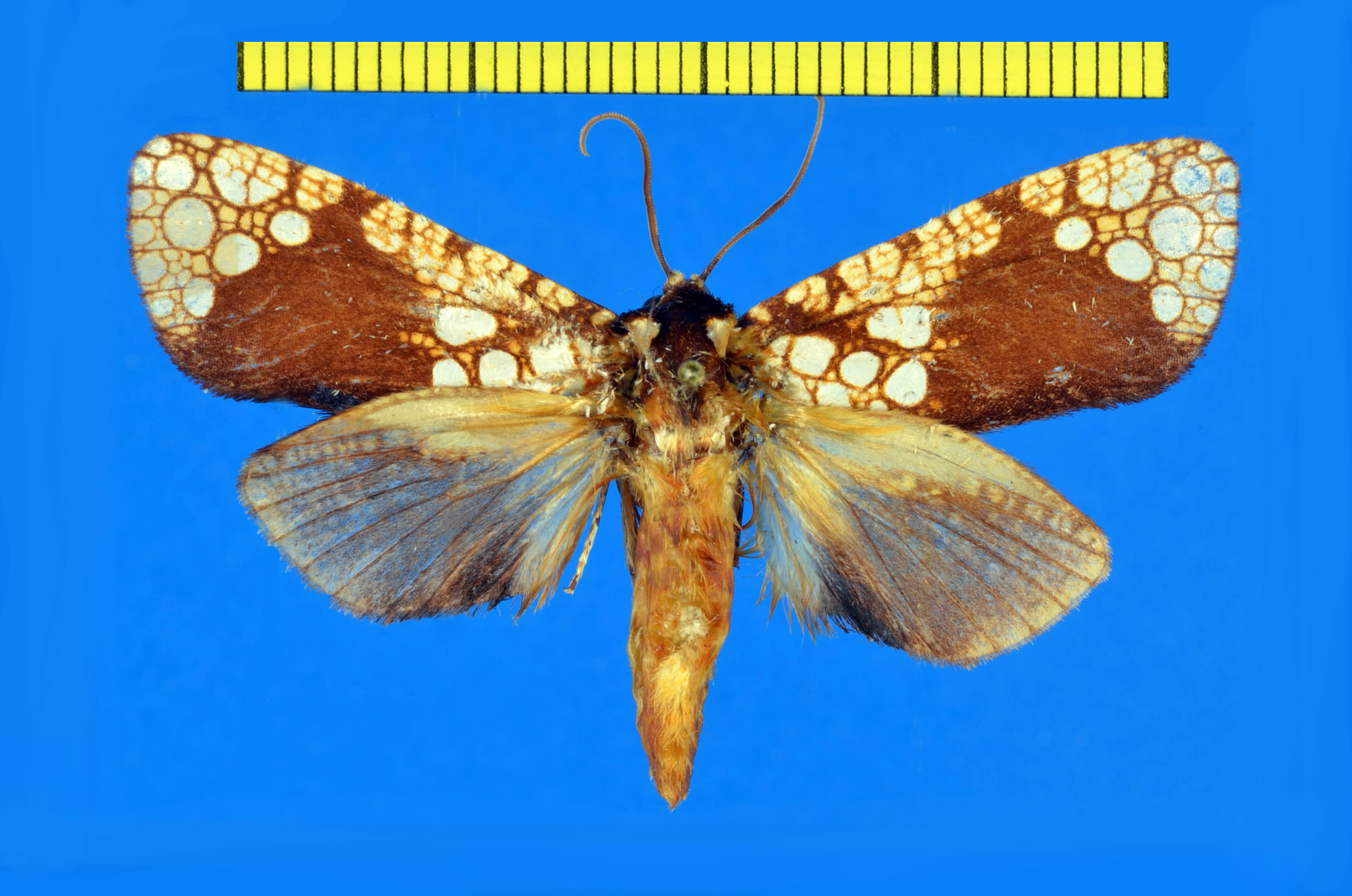
- Dudgeonea sp.

Scientific classification
- Kingdom: Animalia
- Phylum: Arthropoda
- Class: Insecta
- Order: Lepidoptera
- Infraorder: Heteroneura
- Clade: Eulepidoptera
- Clade: Ditrysia
- Clade: Apoditrysia
- Superfamily: Cossoidea
- Family: Dudgeoneidae; Berger, 1958
- Genus: Dudgeonea; Hampson, 1900

Species
- Dudgeonea actinias; Dudgeonea leucosticta...

= Dudgeonea =

Genus of moths

Dudgeonea is a small genus of moths and the only genus of its family, the Dudgeoneidae. It includes six species distributed sparsely across the Old World from Africa and Madagascar to Australia and New Guinea.

== Biology ==
The genus is poorly studied, but the Australian species, Dudgeonea actinias, tunnels in trunks of Canthium attenuatum (Rubiaceae) and the pupa is extruded like many other internal feeders.
