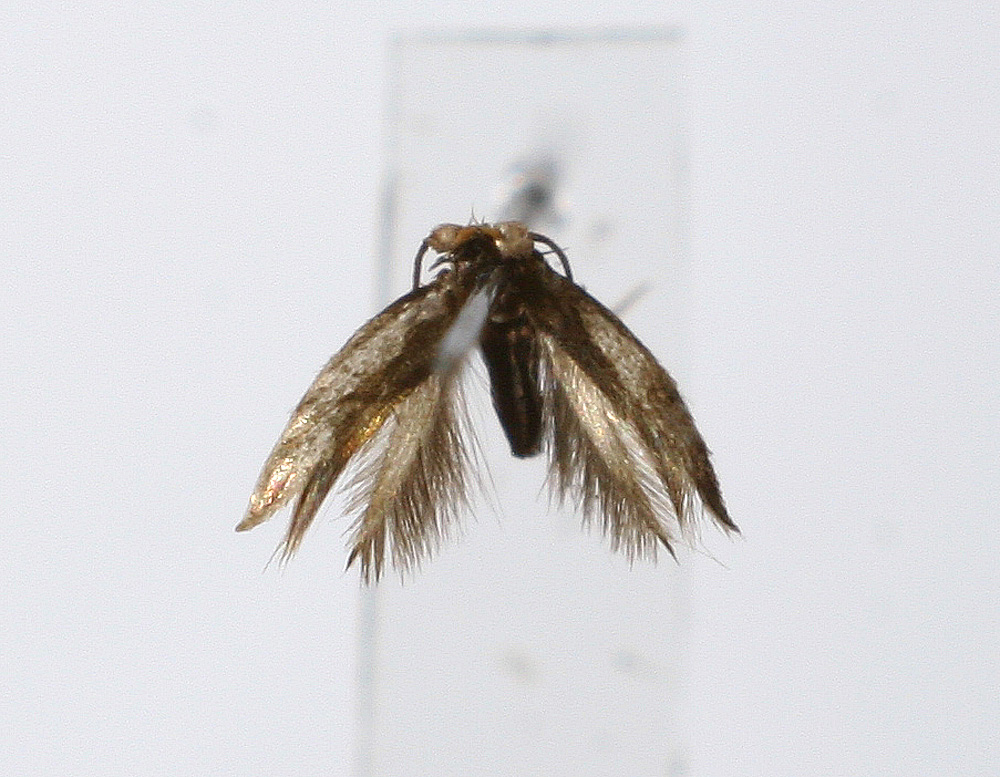
- Stigmella alnetella

Scientific classification
- Kingdom: Animalia
- Phylum: Arthropoda
- Clade: Pancrustacea
- Class: Insecta
- Order: Lepidoptera
- Infraorder: Heteroneura
- Clade: Nepticulina; Meyrick, 1923
- Superfamily: Nepticuloidea; Stainton 1854

Families
- Nepticulidae; Opostegidae

Diversity
- About 900 species described

= Nepticuloidea =

Superfamily of moths

Nepticuloidea is a superfamily of usually very small monotrysian moths that are characterised by small or large eyecaps over the compound eyes. It comprises two families, the "pigmy moths" (Nepticulidae), with 12 genera which are very diverse worldwide and are usually leaf miners, and the "white eyecap moths" (Opostegidae), also worldwide but with five genera and about a ninth as many species, whose biology is less well known (Davis, 1999).

== Sources ==
- Firefly Encyclopedia of Insects and Spiders, edited by Christopher O'Toole, ISBN 1-55297-612-2, 2002
