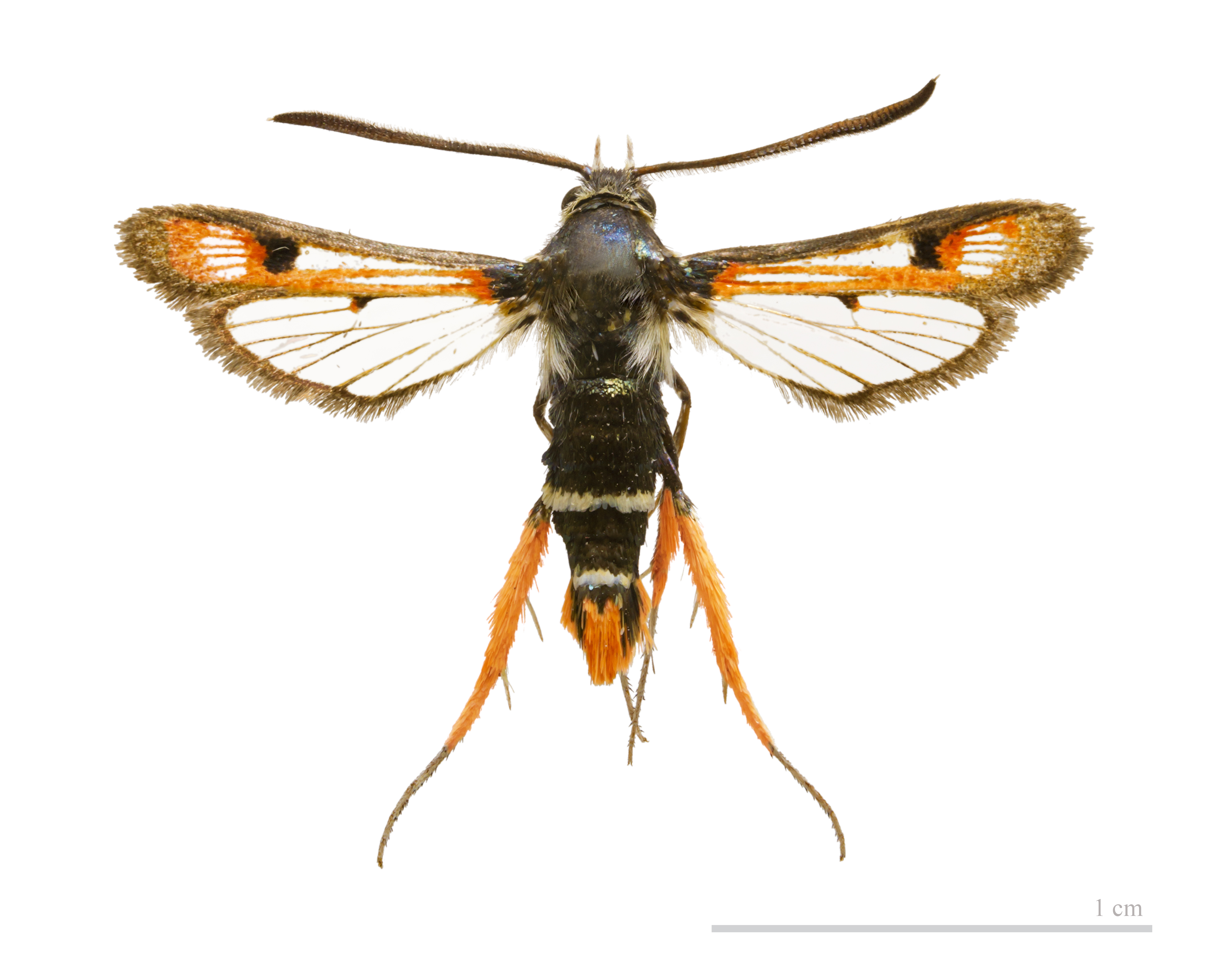
- Pyropteron chrysidiforme - Sesioidea

Scientific classification
- Domain: Eukaryota
- Kingdom: Animalia
- Phylum: Arthropoda
- Class: Insecta
- Order: Lepidoptera
- Clade: Macroheterocera
- Superfamily: Sesioidea

Families
- Sesiidae; Castniidae; Brachodidae

Diversity
- over 1,300 species

= Sesioidea =

Superfamily of moths

Sesioidea is a superfamily containing clearwing moths (Sesiidae), castniid moths (Castniidae) and little bear moths (Brachodidae). There is evidence from head and thoracic morphology that the first two families, internally feeding in plants as caterpillars, are sisters, whilst some brachodids are known to feed on leaf surfaces (Edwards et al., 1999). Sesioidea is closely related to Cossoidea, which contains the also internal-feeding Goat and Leopard moths, and recent taxonomic treatments consider the sesioid families as part of Cossoidea sensu lato.
