= Acanthopteroctetidae =

Scientific classification
- Kingdom: Animalia
- Phylum: Arthropoda
- Clade: Pancrustacea
- Class: Insecta
- Order: Lepidoptera
- Clade: Coelolepida
- Infraorder: Acanthoctesia
- Superfamily: Acanthopteroctetoidea
- Family: Acanthopteroctetidae; Davis, 1978

Genera and species
- Acanthopteroctetes Braun, 1921: Acanthopteroctetes aurulenta Davis, 1984; Acanthopteroctetes bimaculata Davis, 1969; Acanthopteroctetes nepticuloides Mey, 2011; Acanthopteroctetes tripunctata Braun, 1921; Acanthopteroctetes unifascia Davis, 1978; Catapterix Zagulajev & Sinev, 1988: Catapterix crimaea Zagulajev & Sinev, 1988; Catapterix tianshanica Mey & Rutjan, 2016

Diversity
- 7 described species in 2 genera + 2 undescribed species

Infraorder of moths

Acanthopteroctetidae is a small family of moths with two described genera, Acanthopteroctetes and Catapterix, a total of seven described species, and two undescribed species. They are known as the archaic sun moths.

The Acanthopteroctetidae have been classified as the sole family in the superfamily Acanthopteroctetoidea and the infraorder Acanthoctesia; however, based on molecular phylogenetic evidence, they may instead be classified in the superfamily Neopseustoidea, together with the Neopseustidae and Aenigmatineidae.

== Morphology ==
Moths in this superfamily are usually small (but one is 15 mm. in wingspan) and iridescent. Like other "homoneurous" Coelolepida and non-ditrysian Heteroneura, the ocelli are lost. There are a variety of unique structural characteristics, and they are evolutionary distinctive. The female adults of both Catapterix crimaea and C. tianshanica are unknown.

== Diversity and distribution ==
Four of the species of type genus Acanthopteroctetes (A. aurulenta, A. bimaculata, A. tripunctata and A. unifascia) are very localised in Western North America, while its fifth species (A. nepticuloides) was described from South Africa. Genus Catapterix has two species, of which Catapterix crimaea has been observed in Crimea and southern France, while Catapterix tianshanica is known from Kyrgyzstan.

In addition, two taxa are known to exist but have so far not been formally described: one from the Andes in Peru, and one from China.

== Taxonomy ==
Around the start of the century, they were considered the sister group to all other members of the group Coelolepida, in part based on scale morphology.

However, modern molecular phylogenetic evidence indicates that Acanthopteroctetidae is most closely related to Neopseustidae, and may even fall within Neopseustidae, rendering it nonmonophyletic.

of the Lepidoptera since then has indicated a close relation between the Acanthopteroctetidae, the Neopseustidae and the Aenigmatineidae, and the three may be considered part of a single superfamily Neopseustoidea rather than three separate, monobasic superfamilies. Molecular data from the same research showed weak support for the clade Coelolepida, and weakly contradicted the placement of Acanthopteroctetidae as sister to the remaining Coelolepida.

Genus Catapterix was originally described within its own family, Catapterigidae, which is considered a junior synonym of Acanthopteroctidae, with which it shares specialised structural features including similar wing morphology (in A. unifascia).

== Biology ==
Data on the species in Acanthopteroctetidae are scarce. Of the seven described species, only Acanthopteroctetes unifascia has a full description of the larval stage available. Other than a single record of a specimen tentatively identified as Acanthopteroctetes bimaculata, the larvae of the remaining species in both genera are unknown.

Acanthopteroctetes unifascia larvae are leaf-miners on the shrub genus Ceanothus (Rhamnaceae). They form blotch-shaped mines and overwinter as larva, after which feeding continues in spring. Pupation occurs in a cocoon on the ground. The adult moths emerge during spring and are diurnal.

The specimen tentatively identified as Acanthopteroctetes bimaculata was recorded from a leaf mine on a Ribes sp. (Grossulariaceae).

== Conservation ==
As of September 2022, none of the species in Acanthopteroctetidae have been evaluated by the IUCN.
