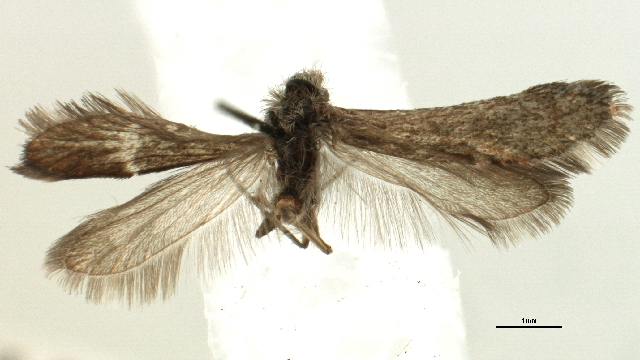
- Heterobathmia pseuderiocrannia

Scientific classification
- Kingdom: Animalia
- Phylum: Arthropoda
- Class: Insecta
- Order: Lepidoptera
- Suborder: Heterobathmiina; Kristensen & Nielsen, 1983
- Superfamily: Heterobathmioidea; Kristensen & Nielsen, 1979
- Family: Heterobathmiidae; Kristensen & Nielsen, 1979
- Genus: Heterobathmia; Kristensen & Nielsen, 1979

Species
- Heterobathmia diffusa Heterobathmia pseuderiocrania Heterobathmia valvifer

Diversity
- About 10 species, but only 3 described

= Heterobathmia =

Sole genus of moth suborder Heterobathmiina

Heterobathmia is a genus of Lepidoptera. It is the only genus in the suborder Heterobathmiina, as well as in the superfamily Heterobathmioidea and in the family Heterobathmiidae. Primitive, day-flying, metallic moths confined to southern South America, the adults eat the pollen of Nothofagus or southern beech and the larvae mine the leaves (Kristensen, 1983, 1999). Most known species are undescribed (but see Kristensen and Nielsen, 1978, 1998).

A possible fossil member of the family, Preheterobathmia is known from the mid-Cretaceous Burmese amber of Myanmar.
