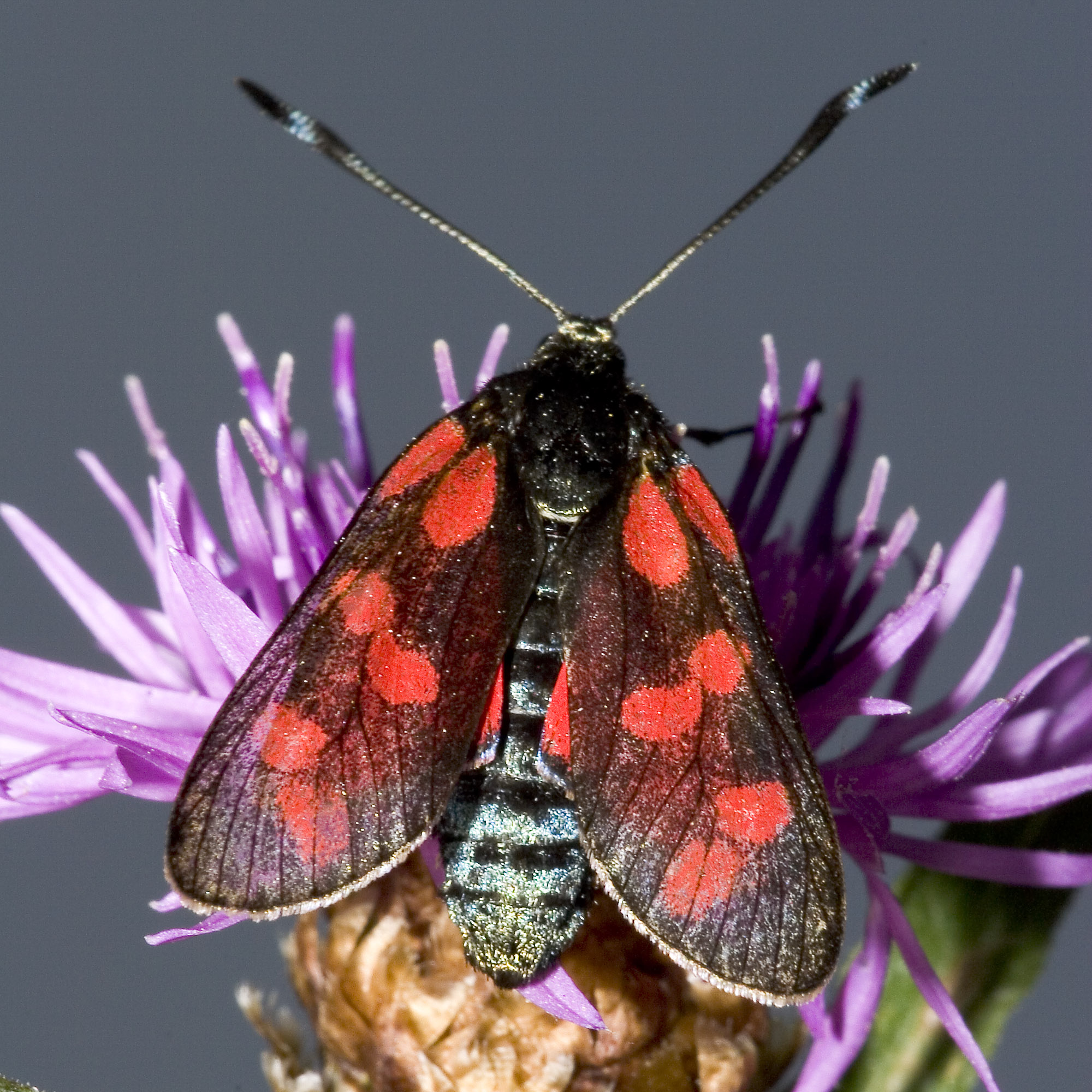
- Six-spot burnet, Zygaena filipendulae

Scientific classification
- Kingdom: Animalia
- Phylum: Arthropoda
- Class: Insecta
- Order: Lepidoptera
- Clade: Apoditrysia
- Superfamily: Zygaenoidea

Families
- See text

Diversity
- Over 2,600 species

= Zygaenoidea =

Superfamily of moths

The Zygaenoidea are a superfamily of moths that include burnet moths, forester moths, and relatives.

The families are:

- Aididae
- Anomoeotidae
- Cyclotornidae
- Dalceridae
- Epipyropidae
- Heterogynidae
- Himantopteridae
- Lacturidae
- Limacodidae
- Megalopygidae
- Phaudidae
- Somabrachyidae
- Zygaenidae
