= Simaethistoidea =

Scientific classification
- Domain: Eukaryota
- Kingdom: Animalia
- Phylum: Arthropoda
- Class: Insecta
- Order: Lepidoptera
- Infraorder: Heteroneura
- Clade: Eulepidoptera
- Clade: Ditrysia
- Clade: Apoditrysia
- Superfamily: Simaethistoidea
- Family: Simaethistidae

Diversity
- 4 species in Australia, China and India

Superfamily of insects

Simaethistoidea is an obscure superfamily of pyralid-like moths with two genera, whose biology and relationships among the Ditrysia is currently unknown, namely the Australian Metaprotus (2 species) and the China and North Indian Simaethistis (2 species) (Dugdale et al., 1999).

== Genera and species ==
- Metaprotus Hampson, 1899
- Simaethistis Hampson, 1896
