= Lionel Shriver bibliography =

A list of works by or about the author Lionel Shriver.

== Novels ==
- The Female of the Species (1987)
- Checker and the Derailleurs (1988)
- The Bleeding Heart (1990)
- Ordinary Decent Criminals (1992)
- Game Control (1994)
- A Perfectly Good Family (1996)
- Double Fault (1997)
- We Need to Talk About Kevin (2003)
- The Post-Birthday World (2007)
- So Much for That (2010)
- The New Republic (2012)
- Big Brother: A Novel (2013)
- The Mandibles (2016)
- The Standing Chandelier (2017)
- The Motion of the Body Through Space (2020)
- Should We Stay or Should We Go (2021)
- Mania (2024)
- A Better Life (2026)

== Short fiction ==
Collections

- Property – Stories Between Two Novellas, 2018 collection

Short stories

- "Kilifi Creek". The New Yorker. Vol. 89, no. 38. November 25, 2013. pp. 110–117.

== Non-fiction ==
- Abominations: Selected Essays from a Career of Courting Self-Destruction (2022)

== Critical studies and reviews of Shriver's work ==
- Levy, Ariel (June 1, 2020). "Looking for trouble : contrarianism has made Lionel Shriver famous, but fiction is what she believes changes minds". The New Yorker. 96 (15): 40–47.
