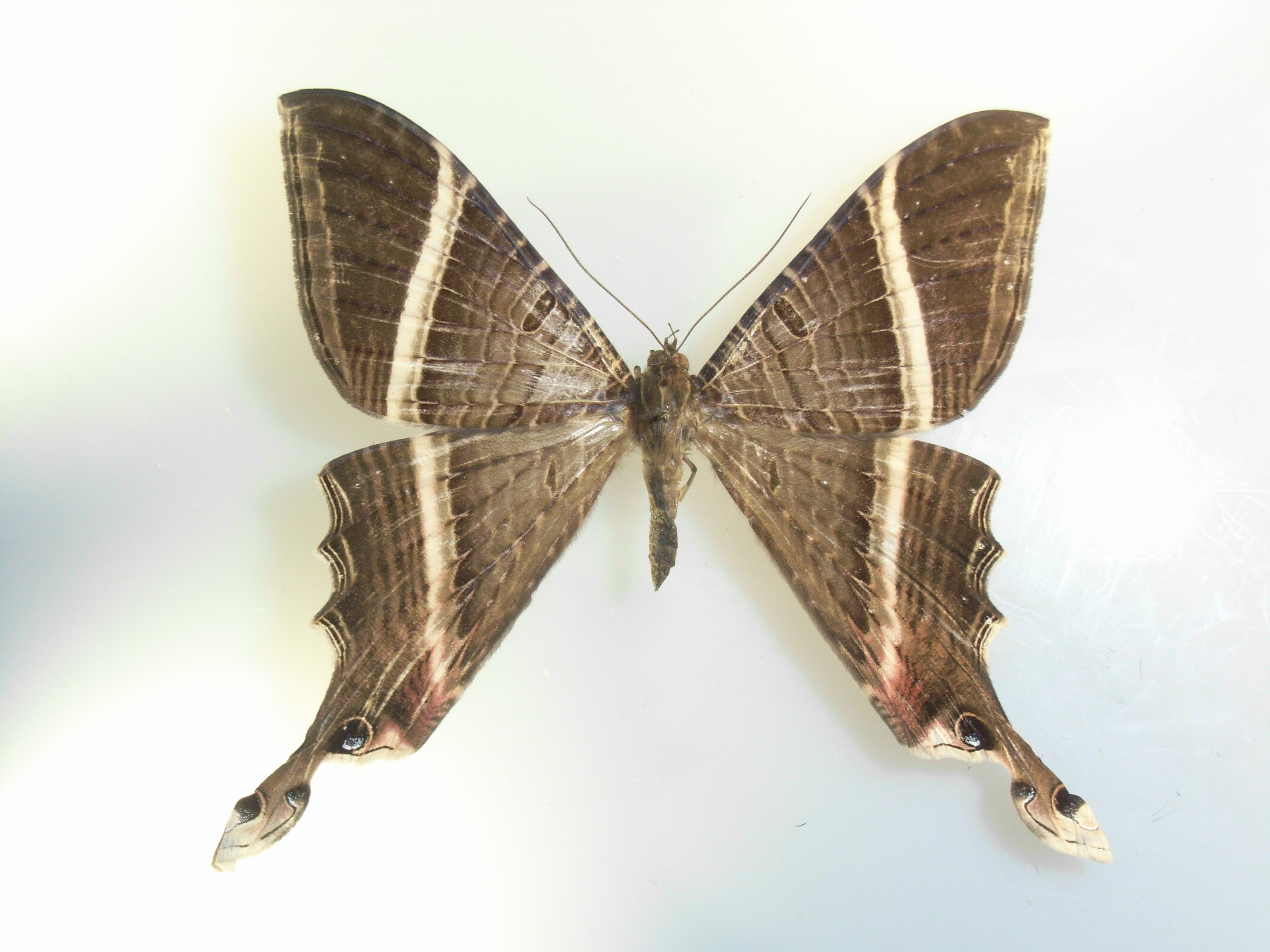
- Mania species from the collection of Felix Stumpe

Scientific classification
- Kingdom: Animalia
- Phylum: Arthropoda
- Clade: Pancrustacea
- Class: Insecta
- Order: Lepidoptera
- Family: Sematuridae
- Subfamily: Sematurinae

Genera
- Coronidia Westwood, 1879; =Conoris Berthold, 1827 [rejected name]; =Larunda Hübner, 1823 [junior homonym]; =Coronis Latreille, 1829 [junior homonym]; Homidiana Strand, 1914; =Homidia Strand, 1911 [junior homonym]; Mania Hübner, 1821; =Nothus Billberg, 1820 [junior homonym of Nothus Ziegler in Oliver, 1811]; =Sematura Dalman, 1825; =Manidia Westwood, 1879 [unnecessary replacement name]; Lonchotura Hampson, 1918; Anurapteryx Hampson, 1918

= Sematurinae =

Subfamily of moths

Sematurinae is a subfamily of moths in the family Sematuridae represented by at least 29 species in the Neotropics.

== Taxonomy, classification and identification ==
Sematurinae has three principal genera, and possibly another two. The hindwing of Coronidia is distinguished by an iridescent blue band, but Homidiana characteristically has pink, orange or yellow markings, especially in females (Minet and Scoble, 1999). The genus Mania is large, brown and tailed, resembling to some extent the genus Lyssa. The approximately twelve other sematurid species in the genera Anurapteryx and Lonchotura are placed here for now (making about 41 species) but may not belong in this subfamily; one species, Anurapteryx crenulata reaches the subtropics of Arizona (Minet and Scoble, 1999). The relationships within Sematuridae clearly need deeper investigation.

- Note: the name Nothus is preoccupied by a genus of Coleoptera (Minet and Scoble, 1999). The genus name Sematura was also in use for this genus, but it was younger (being published in 1825) than Hübner's name Mania from 1821; a petition to conserve the junior name was rejected by the ICZN in Opinion 2352 (2015), so Hübner's name is officially now the valid name for the genus.

== Behaviour ==
The adult moths of Sematurinae are either day or night flying, depending on the genus and have the wings outspread at rest and the genus Sematura displays impressive eyespots at the hindwing tails.

== Biology ==
The biology of Sematurinae is poorly known. The larva of Homidiana was illustrated by Westwood (1879) who incorrectly placed it among Coronidia, and was described by Anton Hermann Fassl (1910). From 1995 to 1998, caterpillars were found in Costa Rica. Sematurine eggs have been described by Joël Minet and Malcolm J. Scoble (1999:302), and are upright, high, with vertical and finer transverse ribs. The caterpillars of Homidiana subpicta have rows of black spines either side of the dorsal midline and five pairs of prolegs. The larva of Coronidia orithea lacks such spines, and is well camouflaged like a lichen-covered twig and has realistic-looking false eyes making it resemble a predatory spider. The larvae of Mania were reared in Costa Rica in 2001 and are a bit similar to those of Coronidia being well camouflaged but bearing small projections rather than long spines one the dorsal surface. Like some Uraniidae, pupation occurs on the ground among debris. The pupa of Homidiana has a long projecting proboscis "sheath" with eight hooklets at the cremaster tip (Minet and Scoble, 1999).

== Larval host plants ==
The caterpillar of Coronidia orithea is so far only known to feed on mistletoes (Viscaceae: Phoradendron quadrangulare). Homidiana subpicta feeds on a more diverse range of plants, including the families Araliaceae (Oreopanax), Gesneriaceae, Piperaceae (Piper), Primulaceae (Ardisia, Myrsine), Solanaceae (Solanum), Onagraceae (Ludwigia) and Theophrastaceae (Clavija). "Sematura luna" reared in 2001 whose well-camouflaged larva is reported to feed on the legume Pentaclethra macroloba (Mimosoideae) and on Syzygium longifolium (Myrtaceae).

== Provisional list of species (based on LepIndex) ==
- Coronidia erecthea Westwood, 1879 [type locality Espiritu Santu, Brazil]
- Coronidia hyphasis (Hopffer, 1856) (originally in Coronis) [type locality Mexico]
- Coronidia orithea (Cramer, Papill. Exot. 3:121) (originally in Phalaena) [type locality Suriname]
  - =? durvillii Guenée, 1857
  - =Coronidia hysudrus Hopffer, 1857
  - =Coronidia boreada Westwood, 1879
- Coronidia difficilis Strand, 1911 [type locality Chanchamayo, Peru]
  - =Coronidia ecuadorensis Strand, 1911
- Homidiana aeneophlebia (Hampson, Novitates Zoologia 25:374) (originally in Homidia)
- Homidiana anilina Bryk, 1930 [type locality Bolivia]
- Homidiana brachyura Hampson, Novit. Zool. 25:373 (originally in Coronidia subg. (Homidiana))
- Homidiana briseis (Westwood, 1879) (originally in Coronidia)
- Homidiana canace Hopffer, 1856
  - =Coronidia aeola Westwood, 1879
  - =Coronidia paulina Westwood, 1879
  - =Coronis cana Hopffer, 1856
- Homidiana egina (Blanchard, 1849) (originally in Coronidia)
  - =Homidiana nicaraguana Westwood, 1879
- Homidiana evenus Boisduval, 1849
  - =Coronis ducatrix Schaufuss, 1870
  - =Homidia subevenus Strand, 1911
- Homidiana gueneei (Druce, 1891) (originally in Coronidia) [type locality Panama, Mexico]
- Homidiana hoppi (Bryk, 1930) (originally in Coronidia) [type locality Colombia]
- Homidiana leachi (Godart, 1819) (originally in Ag[u]arista) [type locality Brazil]
  - =Homidiana japet (Blanchard, 1849) (originally in Coronis) [type locality Brazil]
- Homidiana lederi Pfeiffer, 1925 [type locality Macas, Ecuador]
- Homidiana leucosticta Hampson, 1918 (originally in Coronidia subg. Homidia) [type locality Peru]
- Homidiana strandi Pfeiffer, 1916 [type locality Peru]
- Homidiana monotona (Hampson, 1918) (originally in Coronidia) [type locality Huaylas, Peru]
- Homidiana restincta Strand, 1911 [type locality Macas, Ecuador] (originally in Homidia)
- Homidiana rosina (Felder & Rogenhofer, 1875) (originally in Coronis) [type locality Bogota, Colombia])
  - =Coronidia columbiana Westwood, 1879
- Homidiana rubrivena (Dognin, 1919) (originally in Coronidia) [type locality Colombia]
- Homidiana subpicta Walker, 1854
  - =Coronidia biblina Westwood, 1879
  - =Homidiana echenais Hopffer, 1856
  - =Coronidia granadina Westwood, 1879
- Homidiana tangens (Strand, 1911) (originally in Homidia) [type locality Macas, Ecuador]
- Homidiana traducta (Strand, 1911) (originally in Homidia) [type locality 2–3000 m. Chaco, Bolivia]
- Homidiana westwoodi Oberthür, 1881 (originally in Coronis) [type locality Manazales, Colombia]
- Mania aegisthus Fabricius, 1781 [Jamaica/Hispaniola/Cuba] "Nothus" species
  - =Mania lunigeraria Hübner, 1823 [1825]
  - =Sematura excavatus Walker, 1854
  - =Sematura phoebe Guenée, 1857
- Mania diana Guenée, 1857 [Rio de Janeiro]
- Mania lunus Linnaeus, 1758
  - =Sematura actaeon Felder & Rogenhofer, 1874
  - =Mania caudilunaria Hübner, 1823 [1925]
- Mania empedocles Cramer, 1782 [type locality Suriname]
  - =Sematura selene Guenée, 1857 Dyer/Gentry/"Sematura luna"
  - =Mania empedoclaria Hübner, 1823
- Anurapteryx beckeri (Druce, 1897) (originally in Coronidia) [type locality Mexico, near Durangs City]
- Anurapteryx brueckneri Hering, 1928
- Anurapteryx crenulata Barnes & Lindsey, 1919 [type locality Paradise, Arizona] Image
- Anurapteryx flavidorsata (Hampson, 1918) (originally in Homidia) [no card]
- Anurapteryx gephyra Hering, 1928 [type locality Guatemala]
- Anurapteryx interlineata (Walker, 1854) [Central and South America, no type locality given] (originally in Coronis)
  - =Anurapteryx abbreviata (Maassen, 1890) (originally in Coronis) [type locality Banos, Ecuador, 1800 m.]
  - =Anurapteryx meticulosa Pief, Ent. Zt. 31:7 (originally in ?(type locality West Colombia, Rio Aguacabal, 2000 m., by Fassl)
- Anurapteryx insolita (Strand, 1911) (originally in Homidia) [no type locality]
- Anurapteryx montana Beutelspacher, 1984 [type locality Mexico]
- Anurapteryx ribbei (Druce, 1891) (originally in Coronidia) [type locality Chiriqui, Panama]
- Lonchotura fassli Pfeiffer, Ent. Zt. 31:7, Pl. (originally in ?) [type locality West Colombia, Rio Aguacabal, by Fassl]
- Lonchotura ocylus (Boisduval, 1870) (originally in Coronis) [type locality Guatemala]
  - =Lonchotura dutreuxi Deyrolle, 1874 (originally in Coronis) [type locality Costa Rica]
  - =Lonchotura peruviana Hering, 1928 (originally in ?) [type locality Chachamayo, Peru]
- Lonchotura genevana Westwood, 1879 (originally in Coronidia) [type locality Mexico]

== Other sources ==
- NHM Lepindex
- Dyer, L.A. and G.L. Gentry. 2002. Caterpillars and parasitoids of a tropical lowland wet forest, caterpillars.org, Accessed, March 2007.
