= Mania (disambiguation) =

Mania is a severe mental condition.

Mania may also refer to:

== Mythology ==
- Mania (deity), goddesses in Greek, Roman and Etruscan mythology
- Mania, one of the Maniae spirits in Greek mythology

== Places ==
- Mania, Dildarnagar, a village in Uttar Pradesh state of India
- Mania, the ancient name of Cape Agrilia, a cape on the island of Lesbos, Greece
- Mania River, Madagascar
- Mania Tower, a high-rise building in Pleven, Bulgaria

== Arts and entertainment ==
=== Films ===
- Mania (1918 film), a German silent film
- Mania, the U.S. title of the 1960 horror film The Flesh and the Fiends
- Mania (1974 film), an Italian film
- Mania (1985 film), a Greek film
- Mania (2015 film), an American film

=== Music ===
- Mania (band), a British pop duo
- Mania (EP), a 2013 EP by New Found Glory
- Mania (Fall Out Boy album), 2018
- Mania (Menudo album), 1984
- Mania (The Lucy Show album), 1986
- Ramones Mania, the first compilation album by the Ramones, released in 1988

=== Other uses in arts and entertainment ===
- Another name for Delirium, a DC Comics character introduced in 1990
- Mania (character), a Marvel Comics character introduced in 2013
- Mania (novel), a 2024 novel

== Other uses ==
- Mania (moth), a genus of moths
- Mania (name), a list of people with either the given name, surname or nickname
- Maryland Mania, an American soccer club that played in the USL A-league in 1999
- WrestleMania, an annual WWE professional wrestling event commonly referred to as "Mania" by fans
- Mania, a classification in the colour wheel theory of love

== See also ==
- Maniya Barredo, professional name of Filipina ballet dancer and instructor Josephine Barredo (born 1951)
- Manya (disambiguation)
