= Comparison of butterflies and moths =

A common classification of the Lepidoptera involves their differentiation into butterflies and moths. Butterflies are a natural monophyletic group, historically treated as the suborder Rhopalocera, which includes Papilionoidea (true butterflies), Hesperiidae (skippers), and Hedylidae (butterfly moths). In this taxonomic scheme, moths formed the suborder Heterocera. Other taxonomic schemes have been proposed, the most common putting the butterflies into the suborder Ditrysia and then the "superfamily" Papilionoidea and ignoring a classification for moths.

== Taxonomy ==
While the butterflies form a monophyletic group, the moths, which comprise the rest of the Lepidoptera, do not. Many attempts have been made to group the superfamilies of the Lepidoptera into natural groups, most of which fail because one of the two groups is not monophyletic: Microlepidoptera and Macrolepidoptera, Heterocera and Rhopalocera, Jugatae and Frenatae, Monotrysia and Ditrysia.

Although the rules for distinguishing these groups are not absolute, one very good guiding principle is that butterflies have thin antennae and (with one exception) have small balls or clubs at the end of their antennae. Moth antennae can be quite varied in appearance, but in particular lack the club end. The divisions are named by this principle: "club-antennae" (Rhopalocera) or "varied-antennae" (Heterocera).

The following families of Lepidoptera are usually considered butterflies:

- Swallowtails and birdwings, Papilionidae
- Whites or yellow-whites, Pieridae
- Blues and coppers or gossamer-winged butterflies, Lycaenidae
- Metalmark butterflies, Riodinidae
- Brush-footed butterflies, Nymphalidae which contain the following 13 subfamilies:
  - the snout butterflies or Libytheinae (formerly the family Libytheidae)
  - the danaids or Danainae (formerly the family Danaidae)
  - the Tellervinae
  - the glasswings or Ithomiinae
  - the Calinaginae
  - the morphos and owls or Morphinae (including the owls as tribe Brassolini)
  - the browns or Satyrinae (formerly the family Satyridae)
  - the Charaxinae (Preponas and leaf butterflies)
  - the Biblidinae
  - the Apaturinae
  - the nymphs or Nymphalinae
  - the Limenitidinae (especially the Adelphas) (formerly the family Limenitididae)
  - the tropical longwings or Heliconiinae

The family Hesperiidae, or the skippers, often considered as butterflies, have significant morphological differences from butterflies and moths.

The other families of the Lepidoptera are considered moths.

== Morphological differences ==
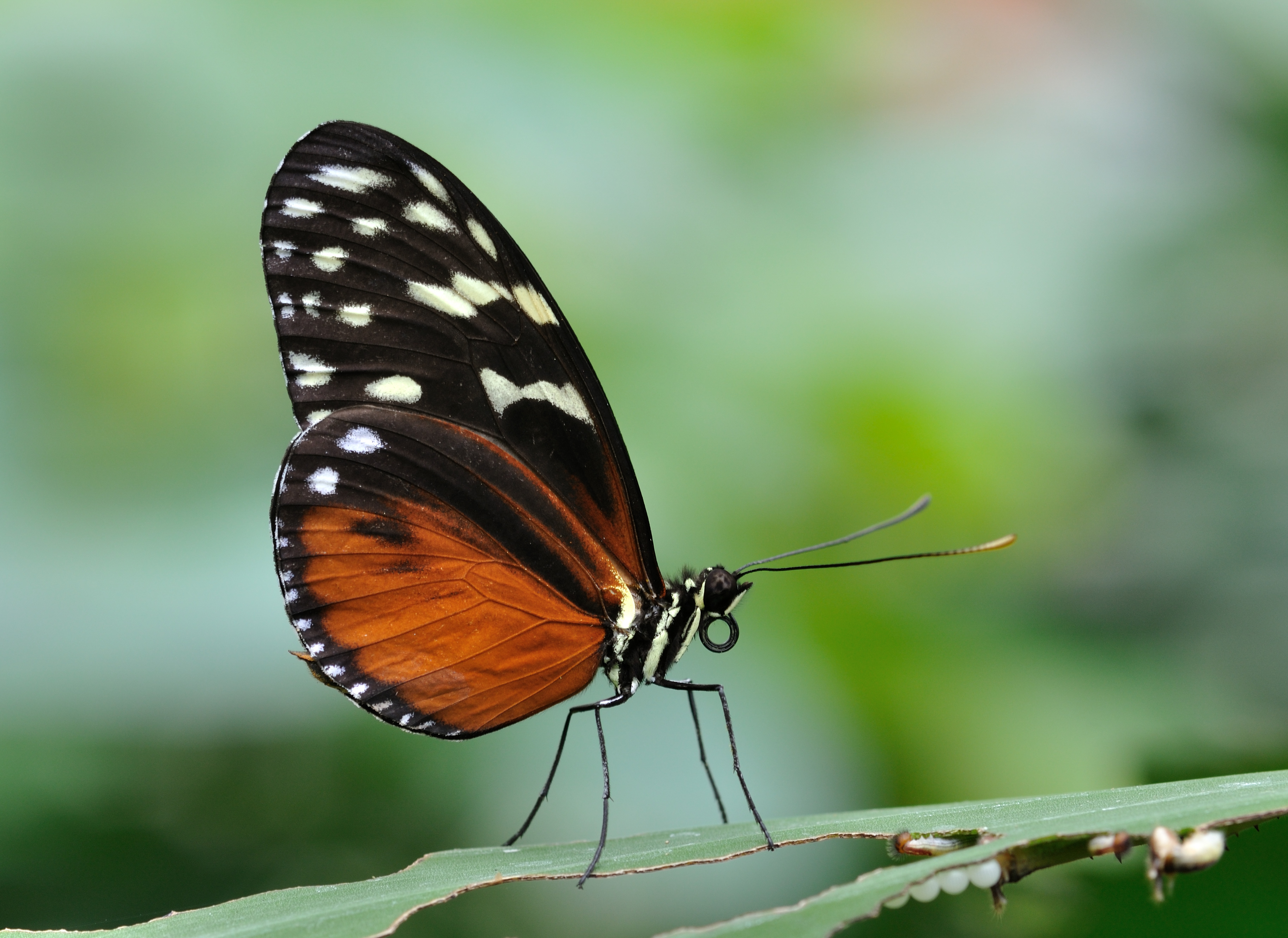
A tiger longwing butterfly (Heliconius hecale) - note the clubbed antennae and slender body

=== Shape and structure of antennae ===
The most obvious difference is in the feelers, or antennae. Most butterflies have thin slender filamentous antennae which are club shaped at the end. Moths, on the other hand, often have comb-like or feathery antennae, or filamentous and unclubbed. This distinction is the basis for the earliest taxonomic divisions in the Lepidoptera: the Rhopalocera ("clubbed horn", the butterflies) and the Heterocera ("varied horn", the moths).

There are, however, exceptions to this rule and a few moths (the families Castniidae, Uraniidae, Apoprogonidae, Sematuridae, and some members of Sphingidae) have clubbed antennae. Some butterflies, like Pseudopontia paradoxa from the forests of central Africa, lack the club ends. The hesperiids often have an angle to the tip of the antenna, with the clubs hooked backwards like a crochet hook.

=== Wing-coupling mechanisms ===
Many moths have a frenulum which is a filament arising from the hindwing and coupling (matching up) with barbs on the forewing. The frenulum can be observed only when a specimen is in hand. There is only one known species of butterfly with a frenulum, which is the male regent skipper Euschemon rafflesia. Some moths have a lobe on the forewing called a jugum that helps in coupling with the hindwing. Butterflies lack these structures.

=== Pupae ===
Most moth caterpillars spin a cocoon made of silk within which they metamorphose into the pupal stage. Most butterfly caterpillars, on the other hand, form an exposed pupa made from a hardened protein, also termed a chrysalis.

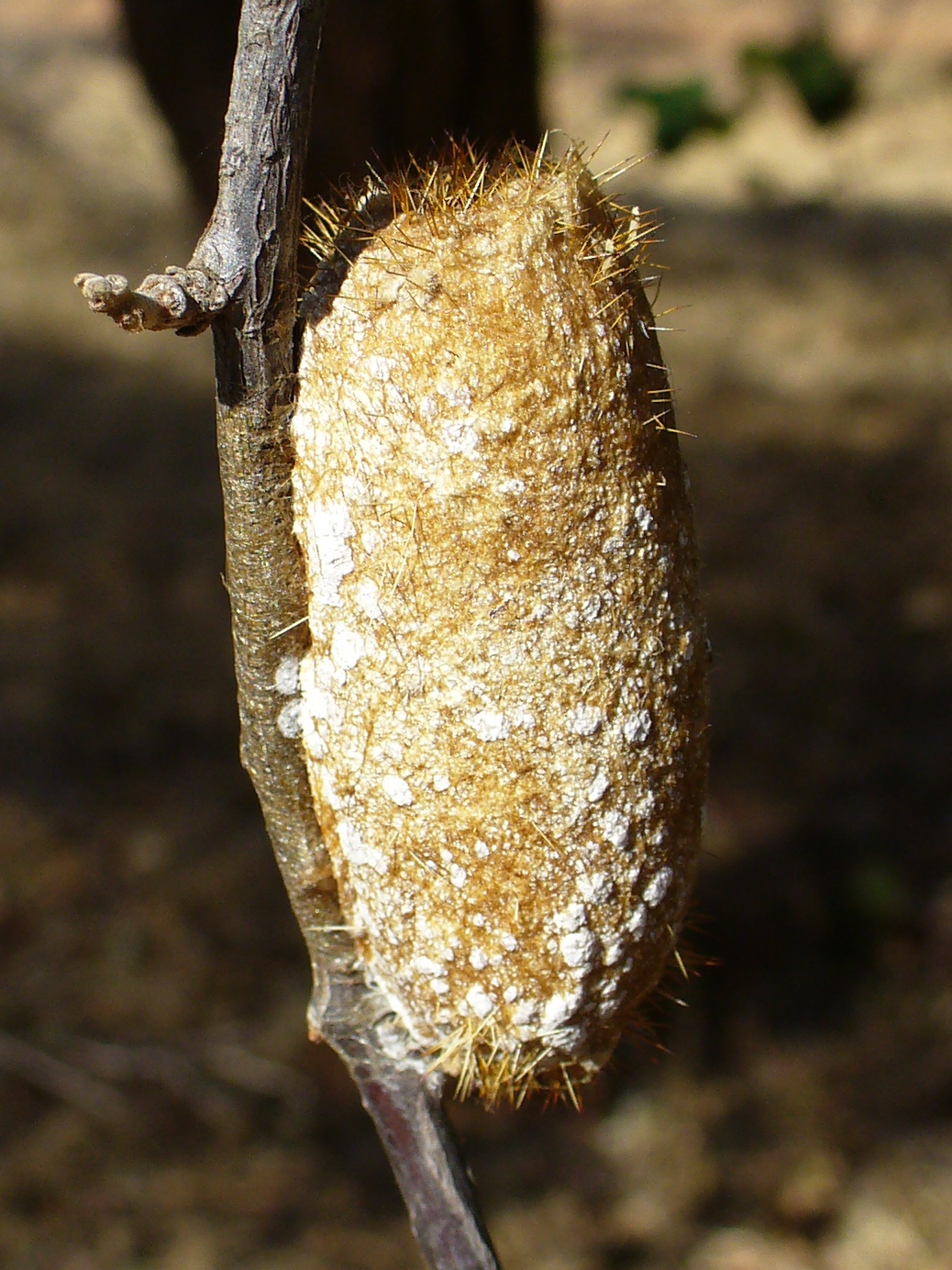
Moths typically form a cocoon

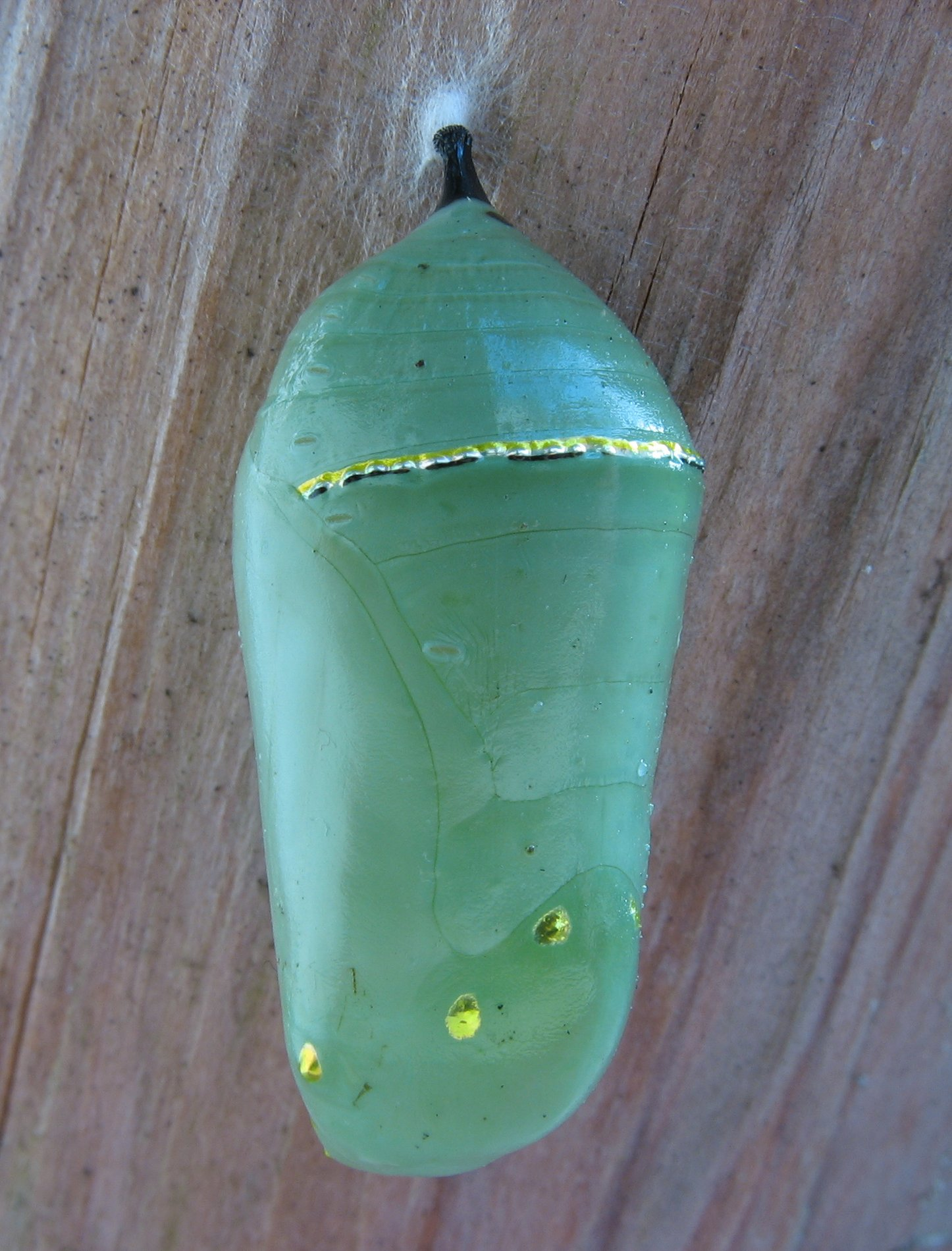
Butterflies typically form a chrysalis

There are many exceptions to this rule, however. For example, the hawk moths form an exposed pupa which is underground. Spongy moths sometimes form butterfly-style pupae, hanging on twigs or tree bark, although usually they create flimsy cocoons out of silk webbing and leaf bits, leaving the pupa exposed. The plume winged moths of the family Pterophoridae also pupates without a cocoon and the pupa resembles the chrysalis of the pierid butterfly. A few skipper butterfly larvae also make crude cocoons in which they pupate, exposing the pupa a bit. The Parnassius butterfly larvae make a flimsy cocoon for pupation and they pupate near the ground surface between debris.

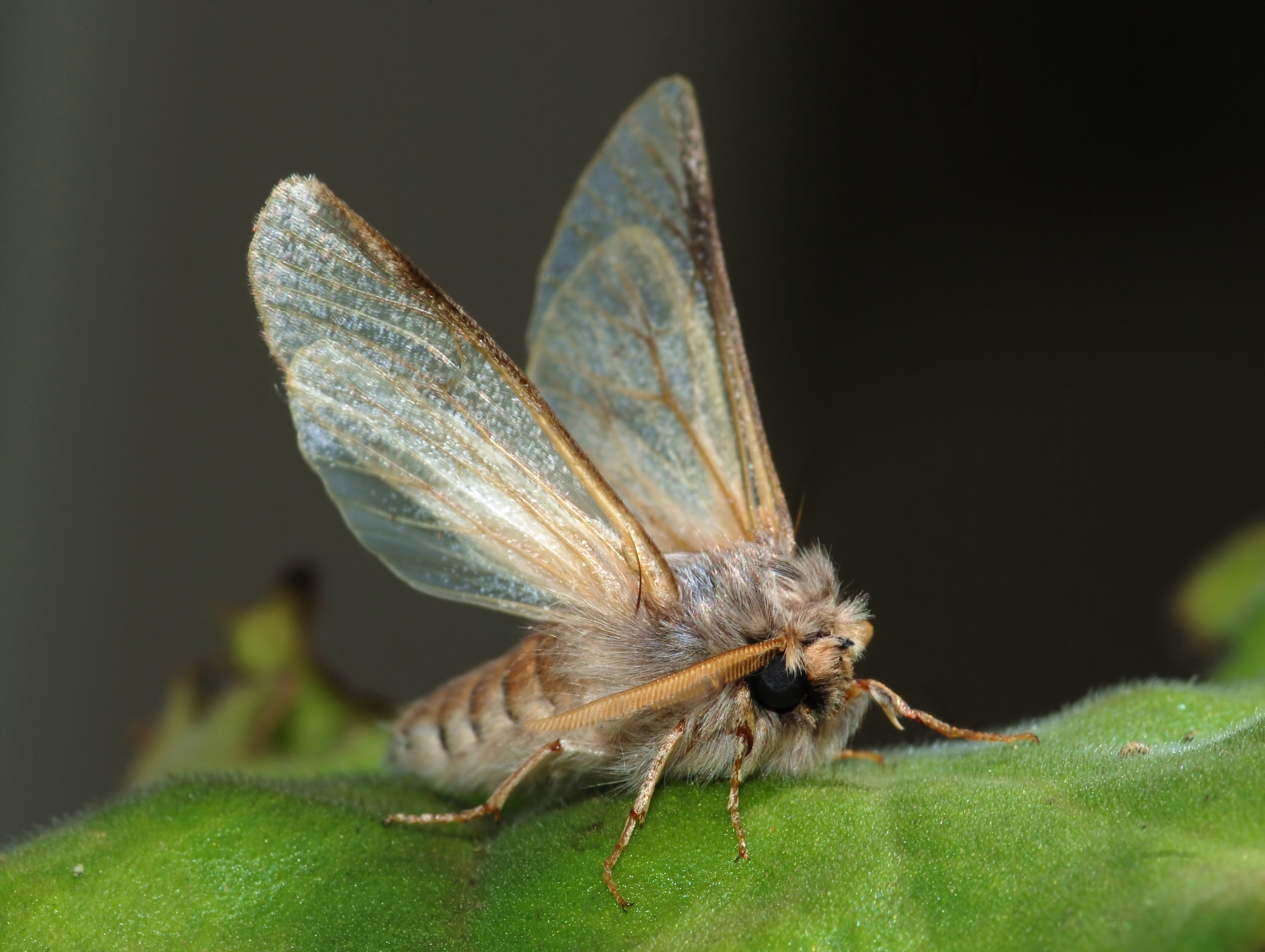
Pine processionary moth (Thaumetopoea pityocampa) - note the feathered antennae and fat furry body

=== Colouration of the wings ===
Most butterflies have bright colours on their wings. Nocturnal moths on the other hand are usually plain brown, grey, white or black and often with obscuring patterns of zigzags or swirls which help camouflage them from predators as they rest during the day. However, many day-flying moths are brightly coloured, particularly if they are toxic. These diurnal species evolved to locate their mates visually and not primarily by pheromone as their drab nocturnal cousins. Several species of Saturniidae moths, such as the giant silk moths, are nocturnal but often have bright colours and striking patterns on their wings. A few butterflies are also plain-coloured, like the cabbage white butterfly or the baron butterfly.

=== Structure of the body ===
Moths tend to have stout and hairy or furry-looking bodies, while butterflies have slender and smoother abdomens. Moths have larger scales on their wings which makes them look more dense and fluffy. Butterflies on the other hand possess fine scales. This difference is possibly due to the need for moths to conserve heat during the cooler nights, or to confound echolocation by bats, whereas butterflies are able to absorb sunlight.

=== Eye types ===
Despite appearances, butterflies and moths have different types of compound eyes. Though not universal, moths very commonly have superposition eyes, while butterflies equally commonly favour apposition eyes. This is due to the superposition eye's adaptations for low light environments suiting the nocturnal moths, and the apposition eye's superior resolution and potential for colour vision benefiting the more diurnal butterflies.

There are several exceptions to this rule, such as with the diurnal Zygaenidae and Sytomidae families of moths, both of which have apposition eyes, or the Hedyloidea family of butterflies, which are nocturnal and feature superposition eyes. In most cases where one species is found to be using the opposite type of eye than expected, it is because they are active during the opposite time of day than is normal for other butterflies or moths.

== Behavioural differences ==
=== Time of activity ===
Most moths are nocturnal or crepuscular while most butterflies are diurnal. There are however exceptions, including the spectacular Uraniidae or sunset moths. A few species, such as the male European/North American spongy moth, fly during both day and night in search of the females, which are flightless.

=== Resting posture ===
Moths usually rest with their wings spread out to their sides. Butterflies frequently fold their wings above their backs when they are perched although they will occasionally "bask" with their wings spread for short periods (several types of Swallowtail butterflies tend to frequently rest with their wings spread when in sunlight). However, some butterflies, like the skippers, may hold their wings either flat, or folded, or even in-between (the so-called "jet plane" position) when perched.

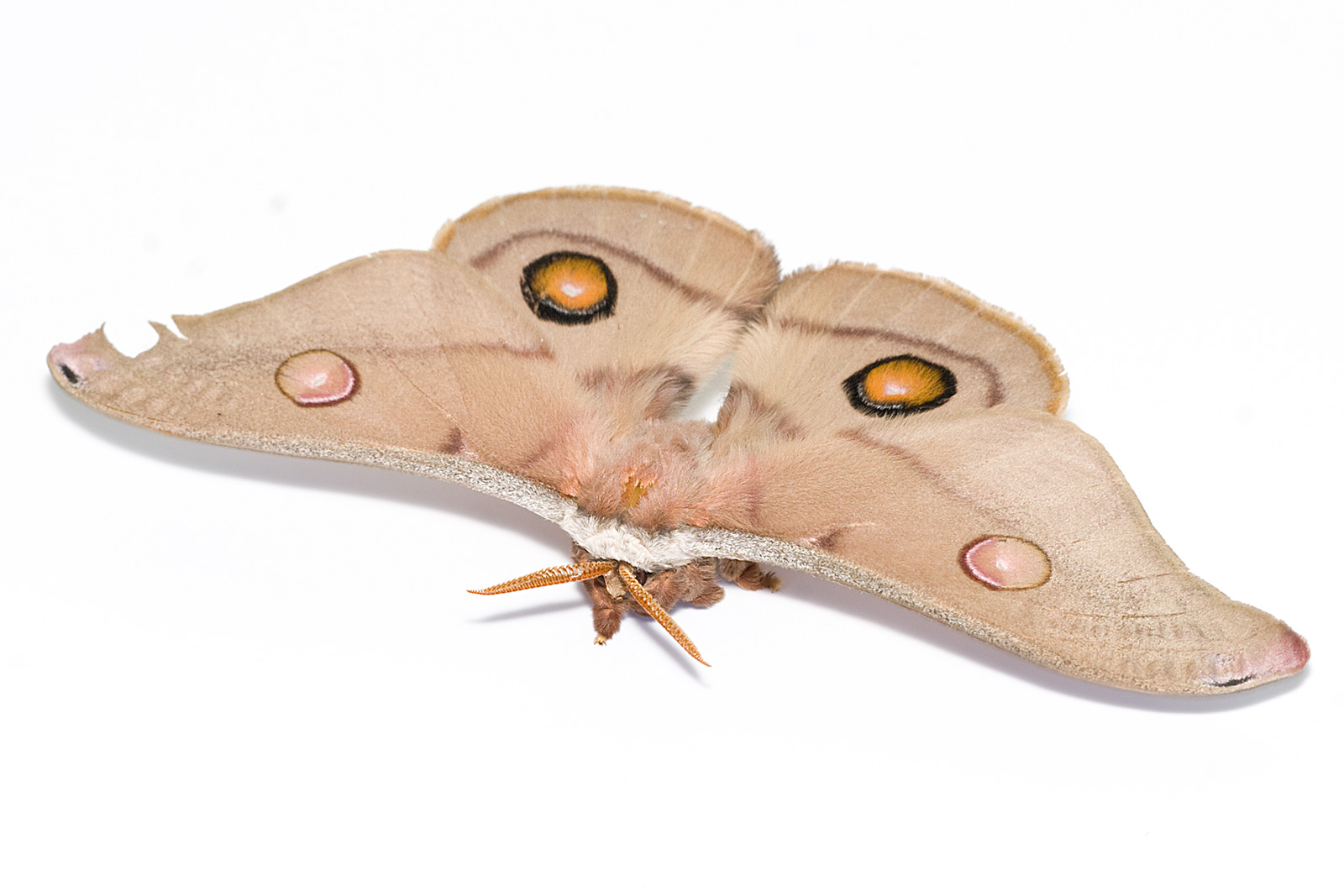
Typical moth resting posture

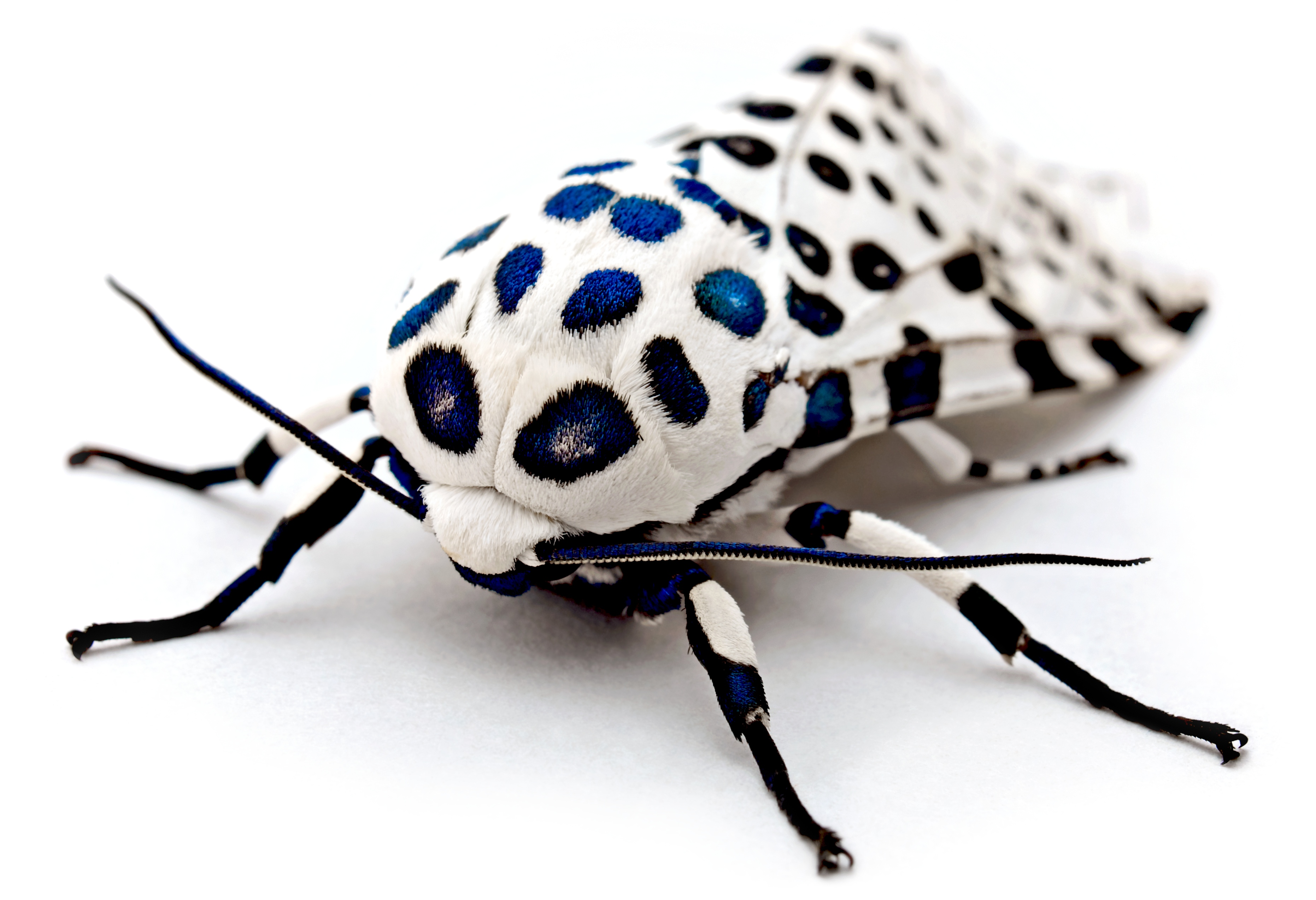
Alternative moth resting posture

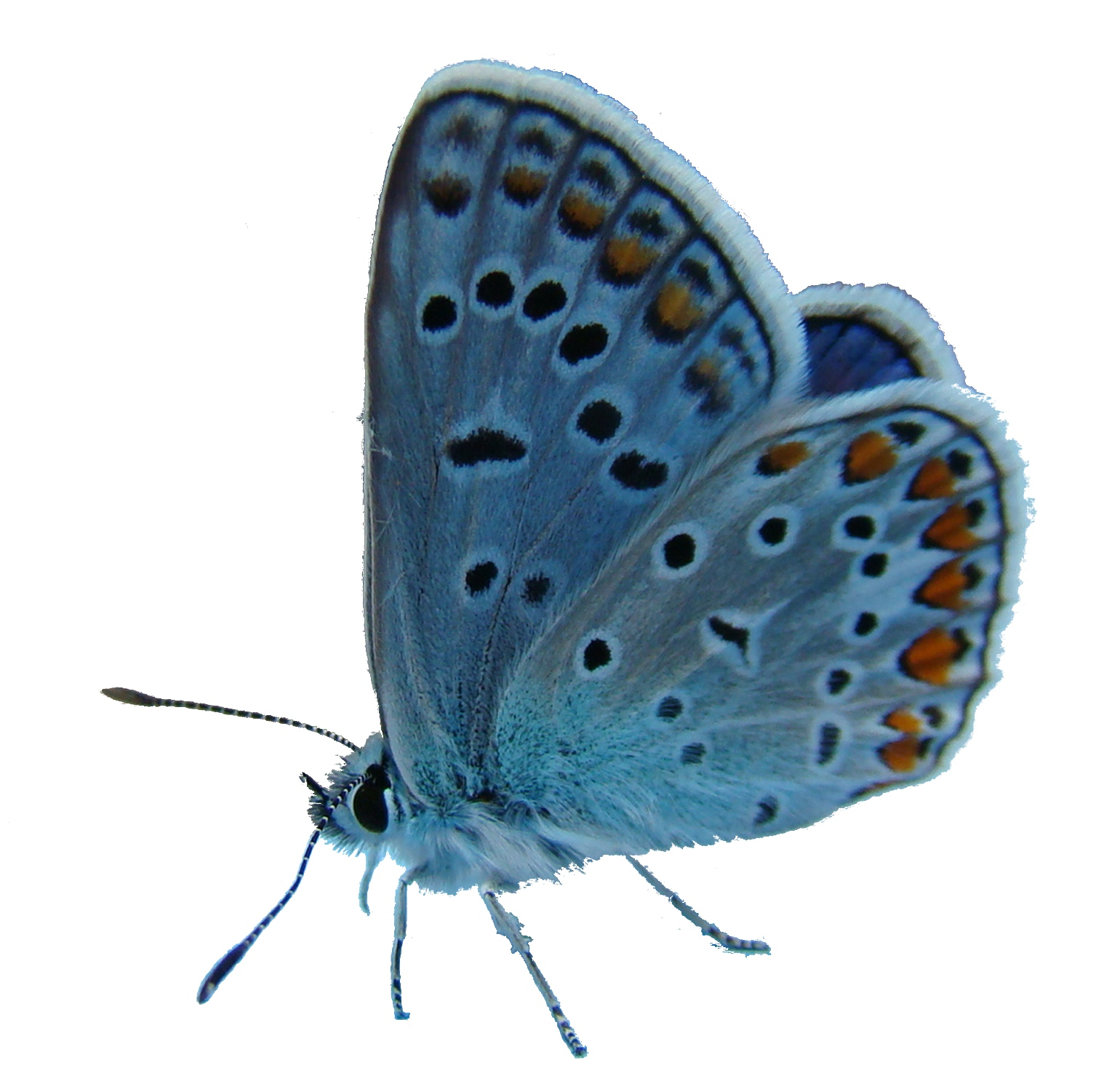
Typical butterfly resting posture

Most moths also occasionally fold their wings above their backs when there is no room to fully spread their wings.

A sometimes confusing family can be the Geometridae (such as the winter moth) because the adults often rest with their wings folded vertically. These moths have thin bodies and large wings like many butterflies but may be distinguished easily by structural differences in their antennae (e.g. bipectinate).

=== Examples of exceptions to the general moth/butterfly distinctions ===
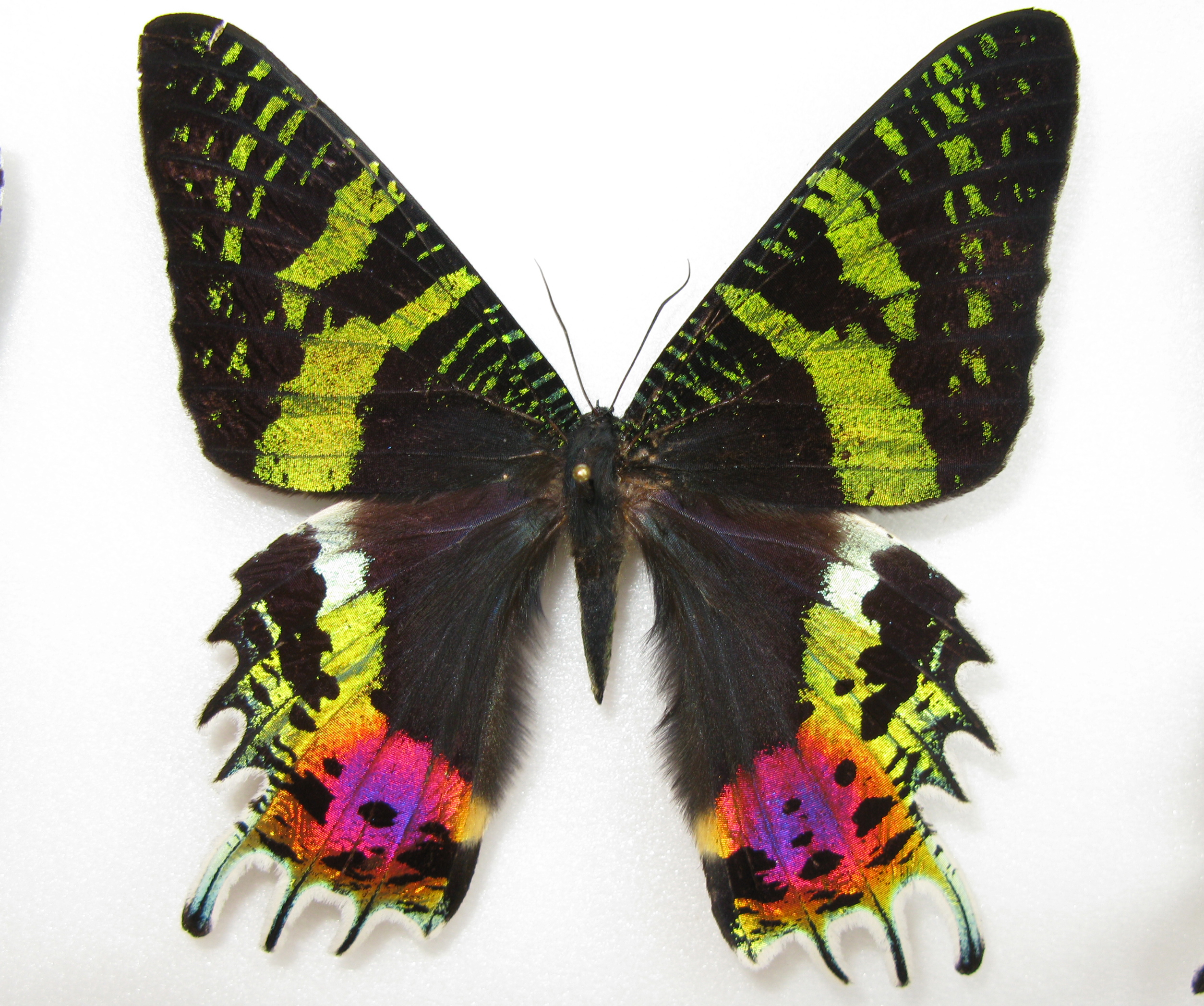
Chrysiridia rhipheus (Uraniidae), the day-flying Madagascan sunset moth, has butterfly-like colours

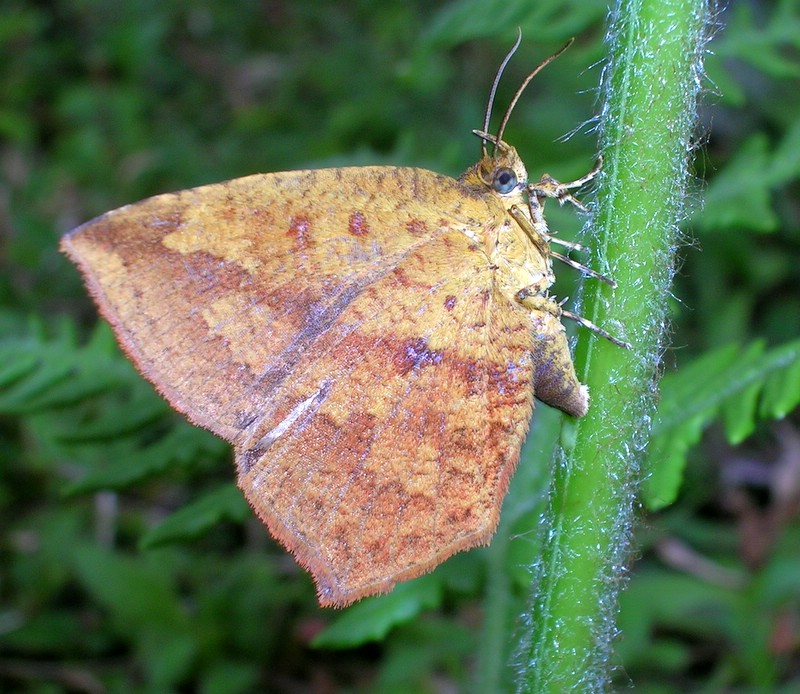
Tetragonus sp., a day-flying callidulid moth holds its wings like a butterfly but lacks the knobbed antennae

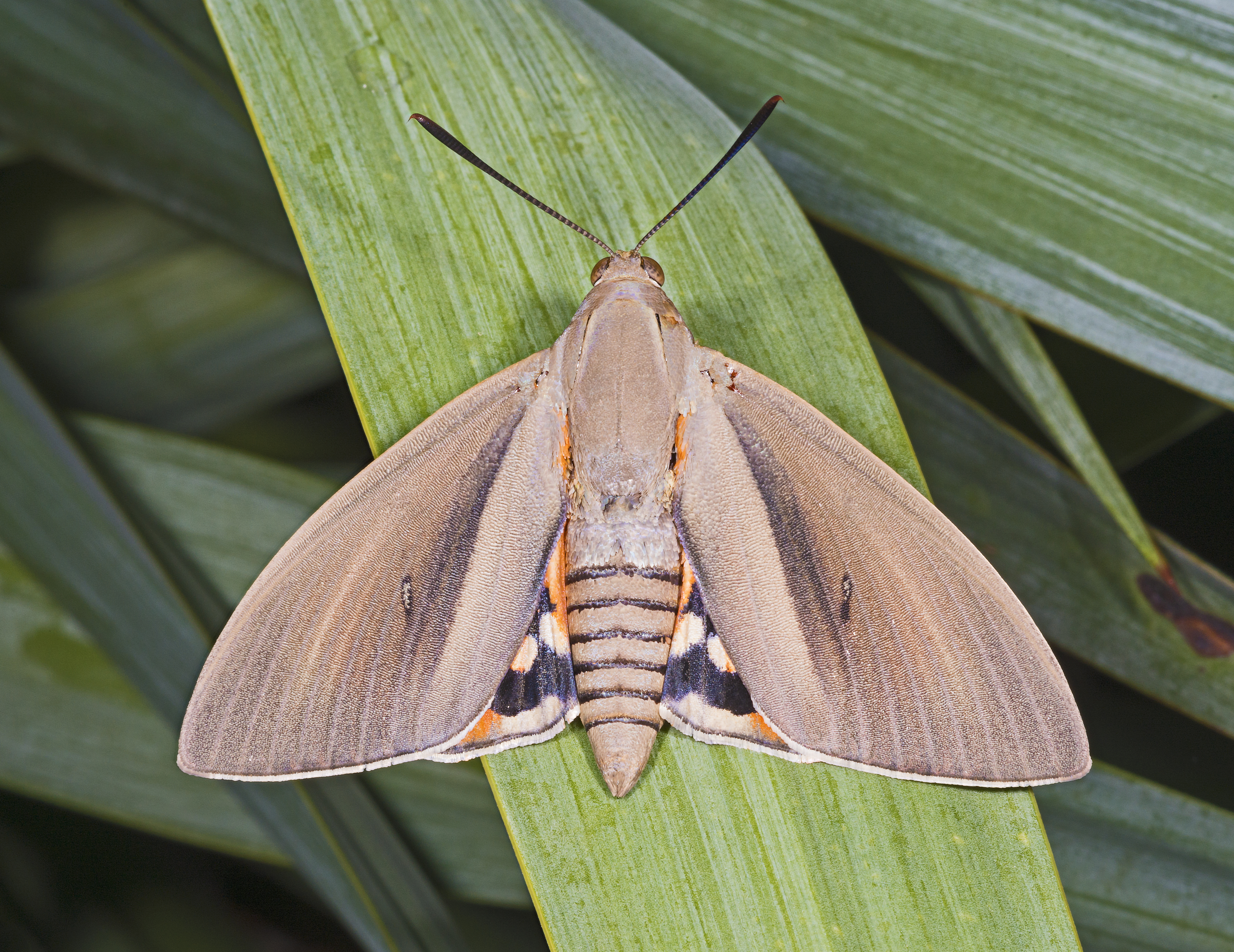
The day-flying Paysandisia archon has clubbed antennae like other moths of family Castniidae

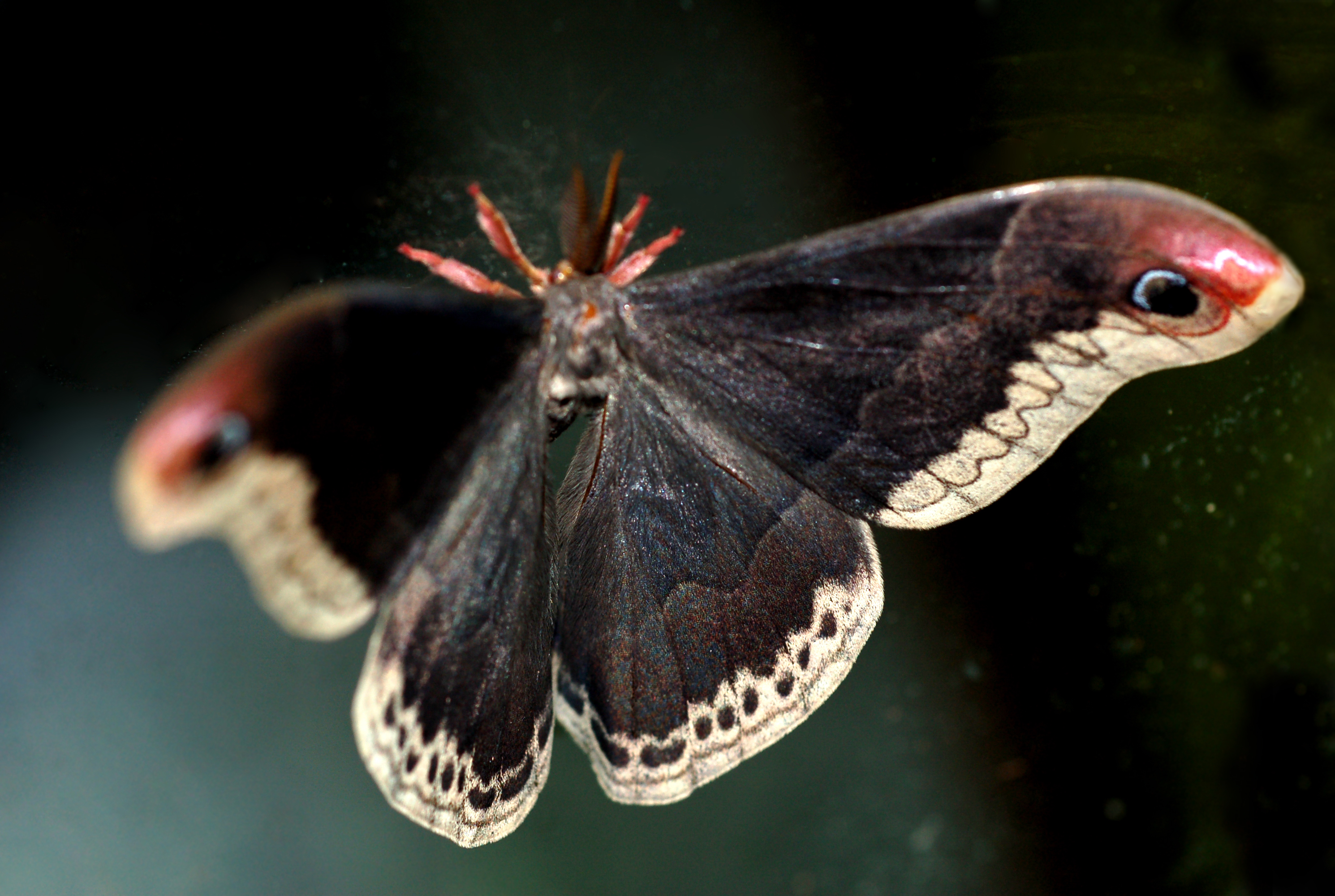
The male Callosamia promethea moth uses Batesian mimicry to mimic the poisonous pipe vine swallowtail butterfly

== Online ==
- Wilkes, Benjamin (1749) The English moths and butterflies
