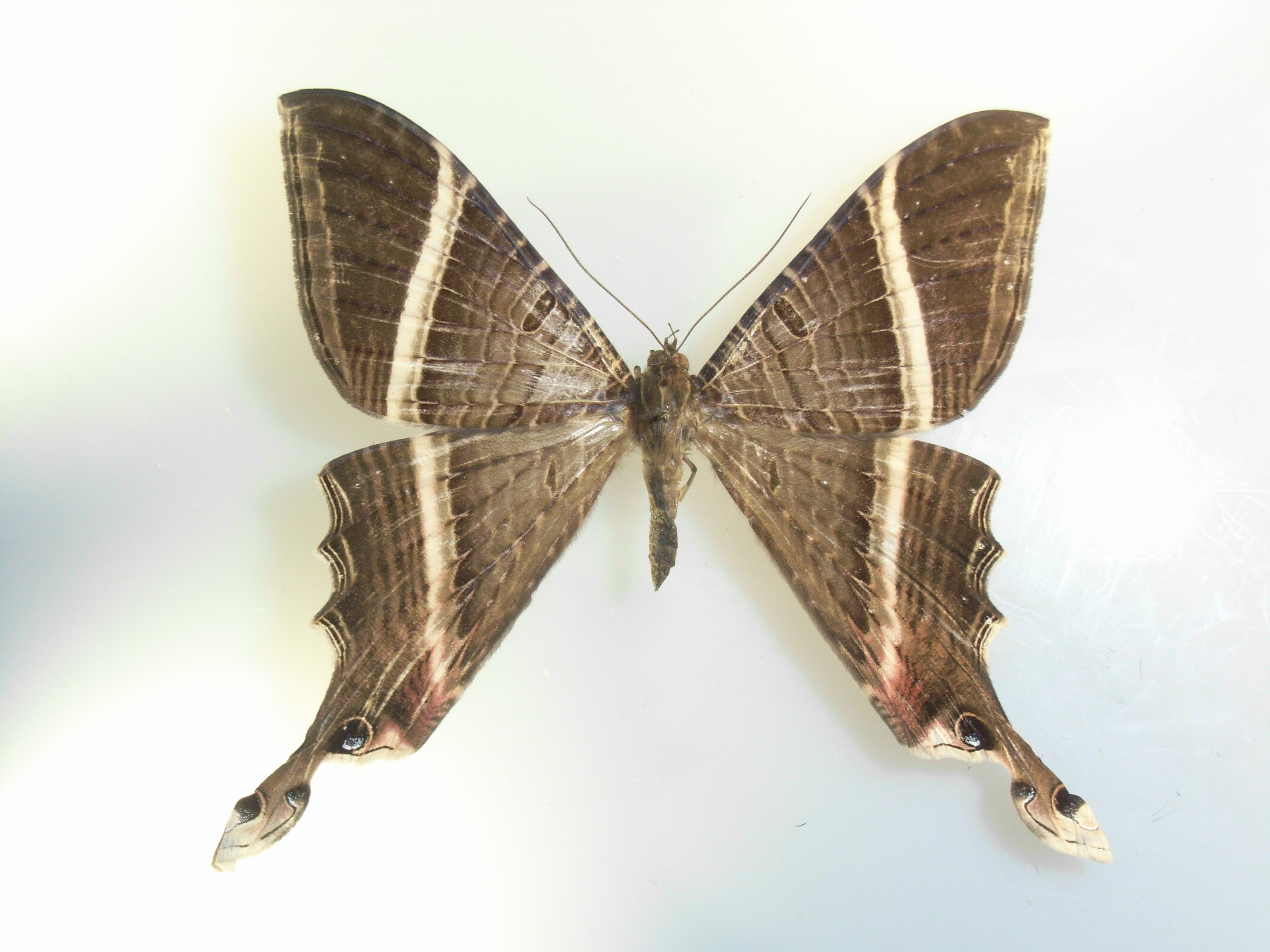
- Mania sp., from the collection of Felix Stumpe

Scientific classification
- Kingdom: Animalia
- Phylum: Arthropoda
- Clade: Pancrustacea
- Class: Insecta
- Order: Lepidoptera
- Superfamily: Geometroidea
- Family: Sematuridae
- Genus: Mania; Hübner, 1821

Synonyms
- Nothus Billberg, 1820 [junior homonym of Nothus Ziegler in Oliver, 1811]; Sematura Dalman, 1825; Manidia Westwood, 1879 [unnecessary replacement name]

= Mania (moth) =

Genus of moths

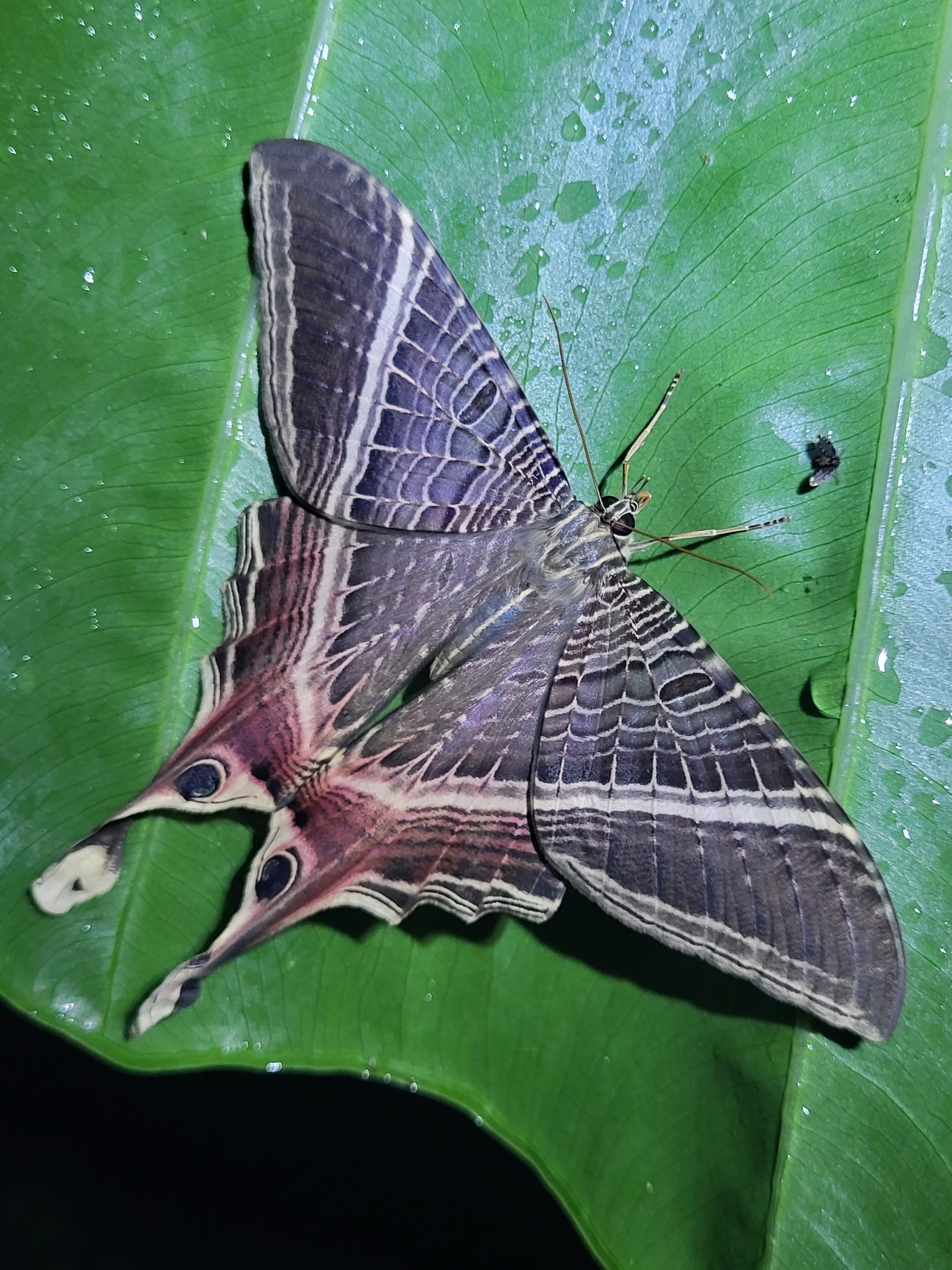
Mania lunus, Costa Rica

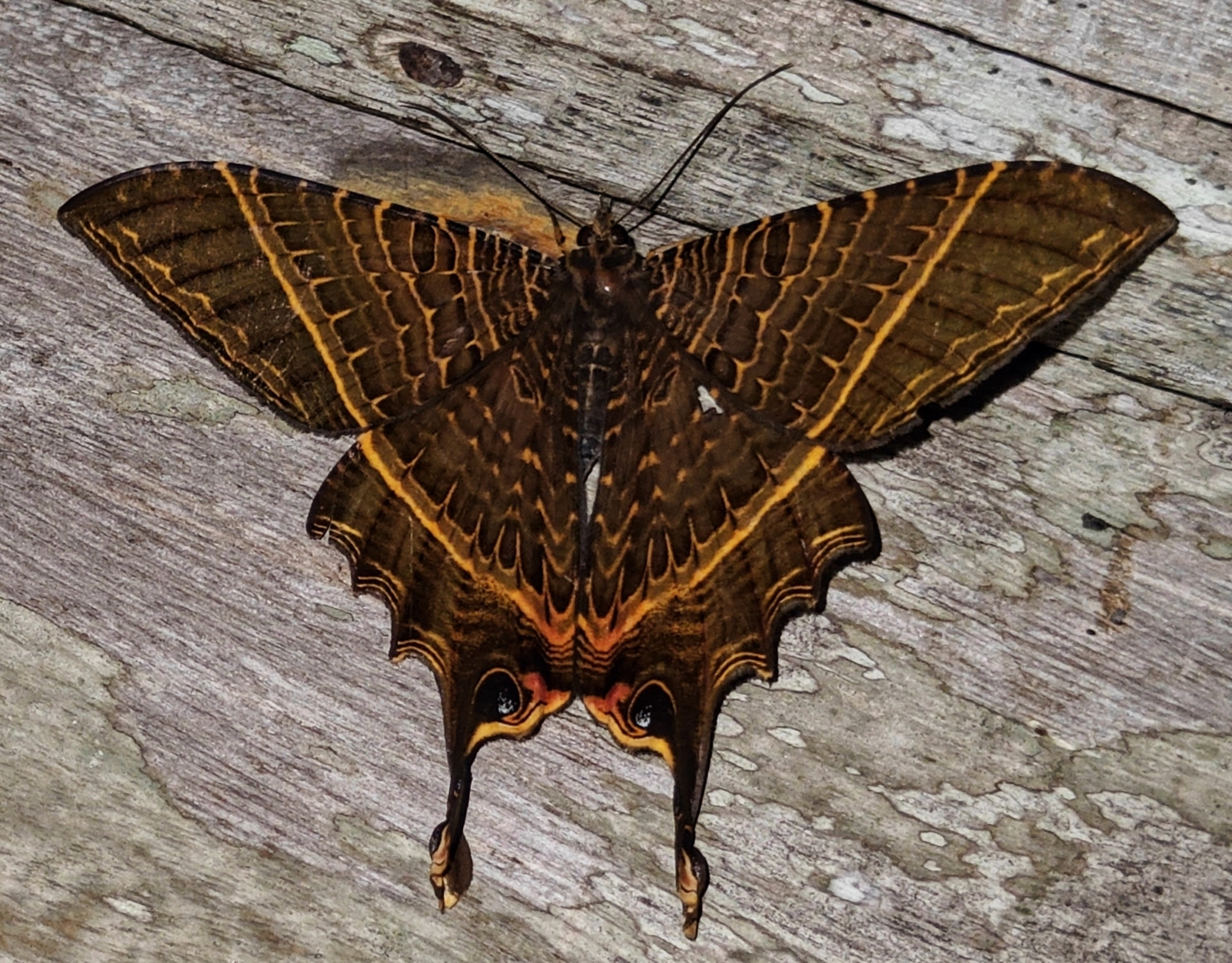
Mania empedocles, Costa Rica

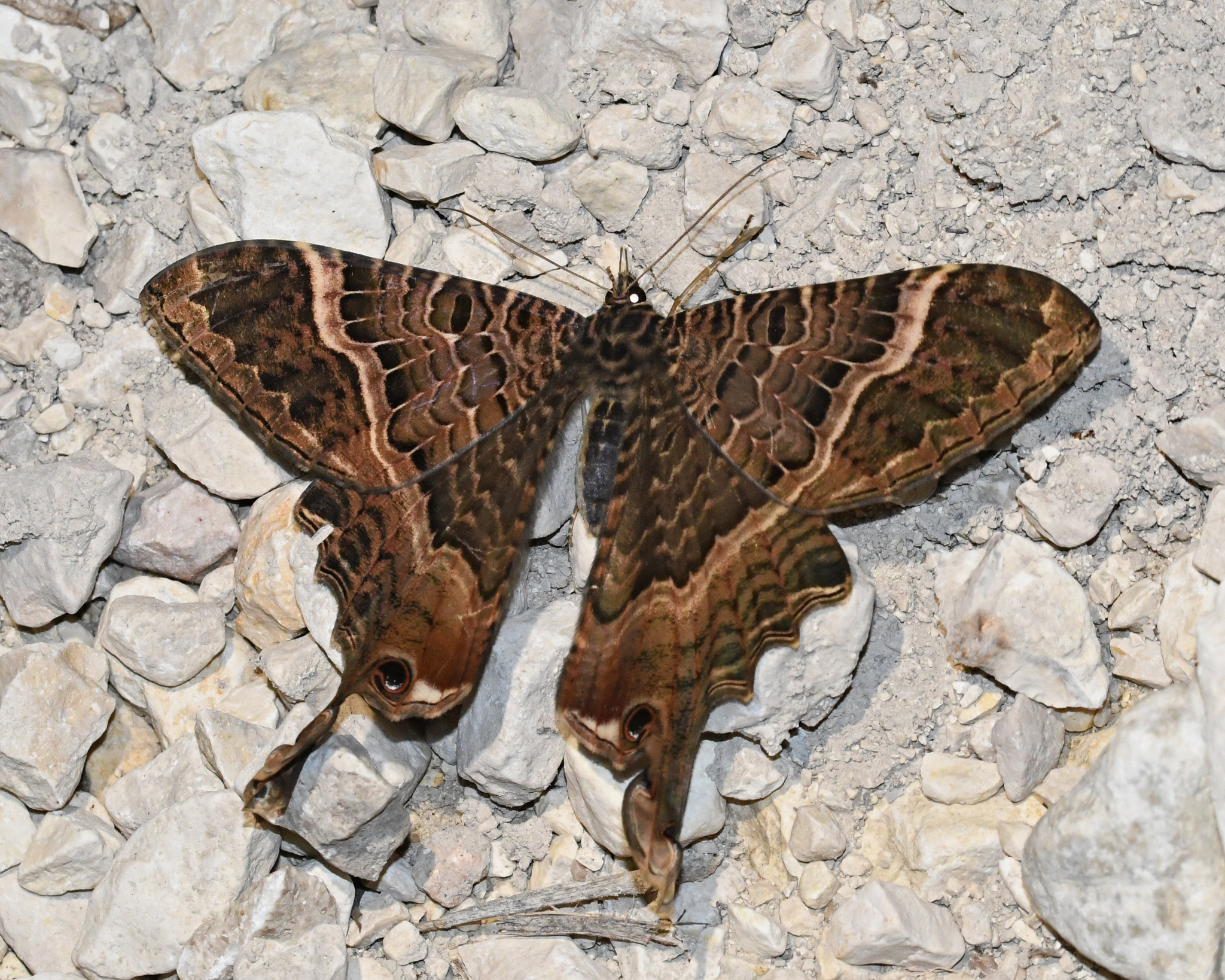
Mania aegisthus, Dominican Republic

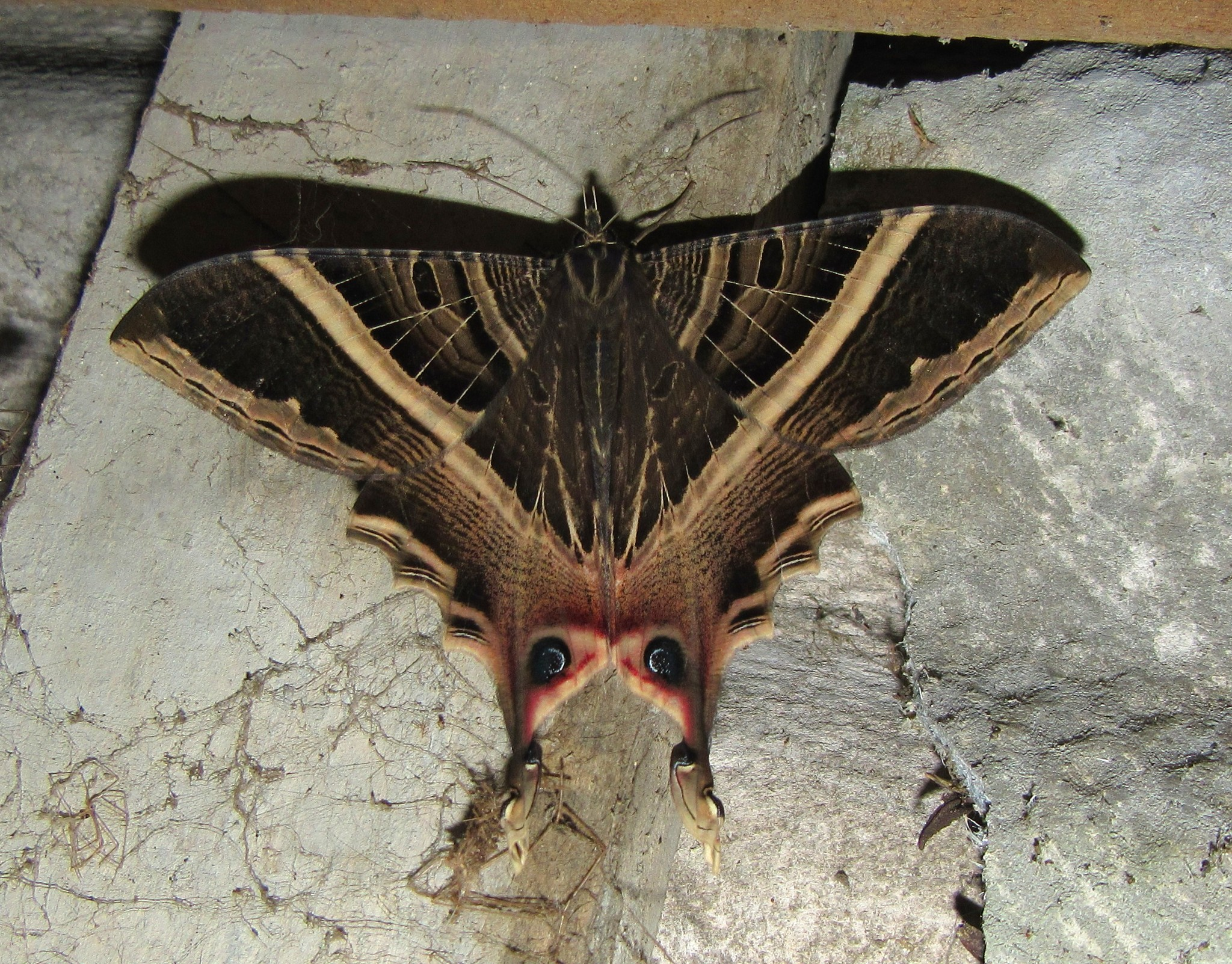
Mania diana, Brazil

The genus Mania comprises a group of tropical and semi-tropical New World moths in the family Sematuridae. The genus has historically been referred to as either Nothus or Sematura, but both of these names are invalid (see below).

== Taxonomy ==
The name Nothus is preoccupied by a genus of Coleoptera(Minet and Scoble, 1999). The genus name Sematura was also commonly in use for this genus, but it was younger (being published in 1825) than Hübner's name Mania from 1821; a petition to conserve the junior name was rejected by the ICZN in Opinion 2352 (2015), so Hübner's name is officially now the valid name for the genus.

== Species ==
- Mania aegisthus (Fabricius, 1781) [Jamaica/Surinam] "Nothus" species Beccaloni, G.; Scoble, M.; Kitching, I.; Simonsen, T.; Robinson, G.; Pitkin, B.; Hine, A.; Lyal, C., eds. (2003). "Nothus aegisthus". The Global Lepidoptera Names Index. Natural History Museum.
  - =Mania lunigeraria Hübner, 1823 [1825] Beccaloni, G.; Scoble, M.; Kitching, I.; Simonsen, T.; Robinson, G.; Pitkin, B.; Hine, A.; Lyal, C., eds. (2003). "Nothus aegisthus". The Global Lepidoptera Names Index. Natural History Museum.
  - =Sematura excavatus Walker, 1854 Beccaloni, G.; Scoble, M.; Kitching, I.; Simonsen, T.; Robinson, G.; Pitkin, B.; Hine, A.; Lyal, C., eds. (2003). "Nothus aegisthus". The Global Lepidoptera Names Index. Natural History Museum.
  - =Sematura phoebe Guenée, 1857 Beccaloni, G.; Scoble, M.; Kitching, I.; Simonsen, T.; Robinson, G.; Pitkin, B.; Hine, A.; Lyal, C., eds. (2003). "Nothus aegisthus". The Global Lepidoptera Names Index. Natural History Museum.
- Mania diana (Guenée, 1857) [Rio de Janeiro] Beccaloni, G.; Scoble, M.; Kitching, I.; Simonsen, T.; Robinson, G.; Pitkin, B.; Hine, A.; Lyal, C., eds. (2003). "Nothus diana". The Global Lepidoptera Names Index. Natural History Museum.
- Mania empedocles (Cramer, 1782) [Type locality Surinam] Beccaloni, G.; Scoble, M.; Kitching, I.; Simonsen, T.; Robinson, G.; Pitkin, B.; Hine, A.; Lyal, C., eds. (2003). "Nothus empedocles". The Global Lepidoptera Names Index. Natural History Museum.
  - =Mania empedoclaria Hübner, 1823 Beccaloni, G.; Scoble, M.; Kitching, I.; Simonsen, T.; Robinson, G.; Pitkin, B.; Hine, A.; Lyal, C., eds. (2003). "Nothus empedocles". The Global Lepidoptera Names Index. Natural History Museum.
  - =Sematura selene Guenée, 1857 Dyer/Gentry/"Sematura luna" Beccaloni, G.; Scoble, M.; Kitching, I.; Simonsen, T.; Robinson, G.; Pitkin, B.; Hine, A.; Lyal, C., eds. (2003). "Nothus empedocles". The Global Lepidoptera Names Index. Natural History Museum.
- Mania lunus (Linnaeus, 1758) Beccaloni, G.; Scoble, M.; Kitching, I.; Simonsen, T.; Robinson, G.; Pitkin, B.; Hine, A.; Lyal, C., eds. (2003). "Nothus lunus". The Global Lepidoptera Names Index. Natural History Museum.
  - =Mania caudilunaria Hübner, 1823 [1825] Beccaloni, G.; Scoble, M.; Kitching, I.; Simonsen, T.; Robinson, G.; Pitkin, B.; Hine, A.; Lyal, C., eds. (2003). "Nothus lunus". The Global Lepidoptera Names Index. Natural History Museum.
  - =Sematura actaeon Felder & Rogenhofer, 1874 Beccaloni, G.; Scoble, M.; Kitching, I.; Simonsen, T.; Robinson, G.; Pitkin, B.; Hine, A.; Lyal, C., eds. (2003). "Nothus lunus". The Global Lepidoptera Names Index. Natural History Museum.

== Biology ==
The larvae of Mania lunus were reared in Costa Rica in 2001 and are a bit similar to those of Coronidia, being well camouflaged but bearing small projections rather than long spines one the dorsal surface. Host plants recorded were Pentaclethra macroloba (Fabaceae) and Syzygium longifolium (Myrtaceae).
