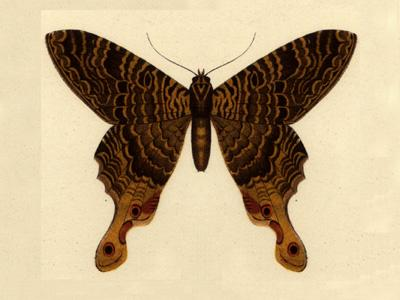

Scientific classification
- Domain: Eukaryota
- Kingdom: Animalia
- Phylum: Arthropoda
- Class: Insecta
- Order: Lepidoptera
- Family: Sematuridae
- Genus: Mania
- Species: M. aegisthus

Binomial name
- Mania aegisthus (Fabricius, 1781)

Synonyms
- Papilio aegisthus Fabricius, 1781; Sematura aegisthus (Fabricius, 1781); Sematura aegistus Auctt. (Missp.); Nothus aegistus Auctt. (Missp.); Mania lunigeraria Hübner, 1823; Sematura excavatus Walker, 1854; Sematura phoebe Guenée, 1857

= Mania aegisthus =

Species of moth

Mania aegisthus is a moth of the family Sematuridae. It is found in Cuba, Jamaica and Hispaniola (the Dominican Republic and Haiti) in the Caribbean.
