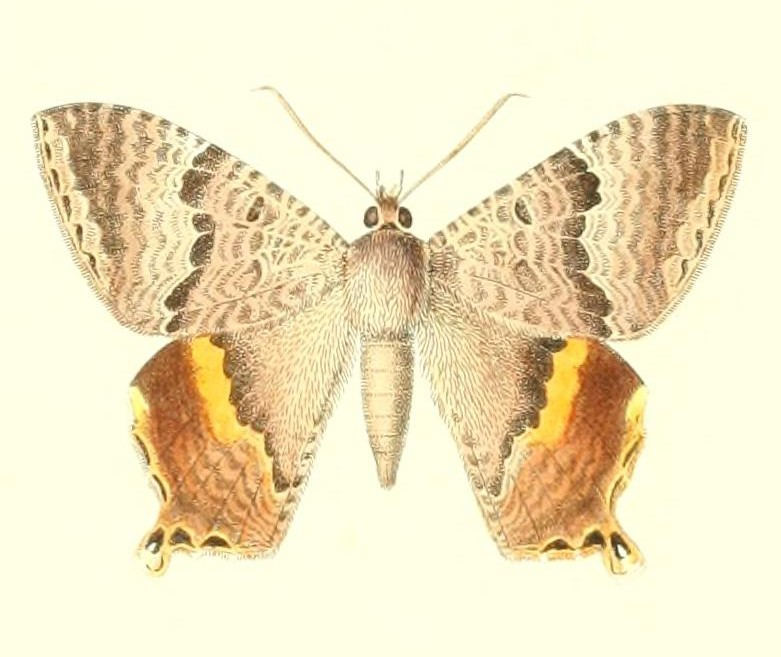

Scientific classification
- Kingdom: Animalia
- Phylum: Arthropoda
- Class: Insecta
- Order: Lepidoptera
- Family: Sematuridae
- Genus: Coronidia
- Species: C. subpicta

Binomial name
- Coronidia subpicta (Walker, 1854)

Synonyms
- Homidiana subpicta Walker, 1854; Coronis echenais Hopffer, 1856; Coronidia biblina Westwood, 1879; Coronidia granadina Westwood, 1879

= Coronidia subpicta =

Species of moth

Coronidia subpicta is a moth of the family Sematuridae. It is known from the Neotropics, including Costa Rica.

The wingspan is 52–59 mm.

The larvae feed on a wide range of plants, including Oreopanax, Gesneriaceae, Ardisia, Myrsine, Piperaceae, Solanum, Ludwigia and Clavija species.
