= The Post-Birthday World =

2007 novel by Lionel Shriver

- First edition
- Author: Lionel Shriver
- Cover artist: Yo Oura
- Language: English
- Publisher: HarperCollins
- Publication date: 2007
- Publication place: United Kingdom
- Media type: Print
- Pages: 600
- ISBN: 0-00-724341-3

The Post-Birthday World is a novel by Lionel Shriver published in 2007, four years after her previous novel, We Need to Talk About Kevin.

== Background ==
The novel contains a number of autobiographical elements. The main protagonist, Irina, is of Russian descent, a language Shriver studied at university. Both Shriver and her protagonist are Americans living in London, both suffer from Raynaud syndrome and both have ended secure long-term relationships, having fallen for 'more creative' types. The New York Times quotes Shriver as saying: "There was more than one moment that I could have gone either way, I know what it’s like to be on the knife edge and to have this inkling that whichever way you go it’s going to have huge implications." It was the potential consequences of this decision that inspired the story.

== Structure ==
The book follows a 'parallel-universe' structure. At the end of the first chapter, Irina, who is in a happy long-term relationship, is tempted to kiss another man. After this the narrative splits, with alternating chapters, each following a different version of Irina. In her 2008 postscript to the book Shriver explains that: this structure "allows me to explore the implications, large and small, of whom we choose to love". She goes on: "You are presented with Irina's two departing futures, and the end of the novel throws Irina's original quandary right back in your lap"... "Do you kiss the guy or not?"

== Plot ==
Irina McGovern, a moderately successful children's book illustrator, lives with her long-term partner, the steady, companionable Lawrence, who works as a researcher at a London think-tank on international relations. Once a year, they meet with their friend Jude and her professional snooker player husband, Ramsey Acton, on his birthday. After Jude and Ramsey divorce, Lawrence and Irina continue this tradition. The following year, 1997, Lawrence is away in Sarajevo but encourages Irina to contact Ramsey, leading to the fateful decision on which the rest of the book hinges: whether or not to kiss Ramsey after retiring to his house to smoke dope after their restaurant meal.

In the first narrative, Irina leaves Lawrence and moves in with Ramsey, leading to a fiery relationship as she accompanies him on his professional snooker tour, neglecting her own career. In the second narrative strand, she remains with Lawrence, though she feels increasingly disillusioned by their relationship. The two narratives intersect periodically as both personal and international events (such as the death of Diana, Princess of Wales and the September 11 attacks) unfold.

== Reception ==
The novel received a mixed reception, with the New York Times praising: "Shriver’s ability to make Irina into a thoroughly compelling character, an idiosyncratic yet recognizable heroine about whom it’s impossible not to care.The Telegraph called The Post-Birthday World: "a wise and moving novel, touching us most deeply when it shows us how finite our lives are, and how infinite we want them to be," although The Guardian criticized the book's: "rigidity" and "avoidance of risk".
