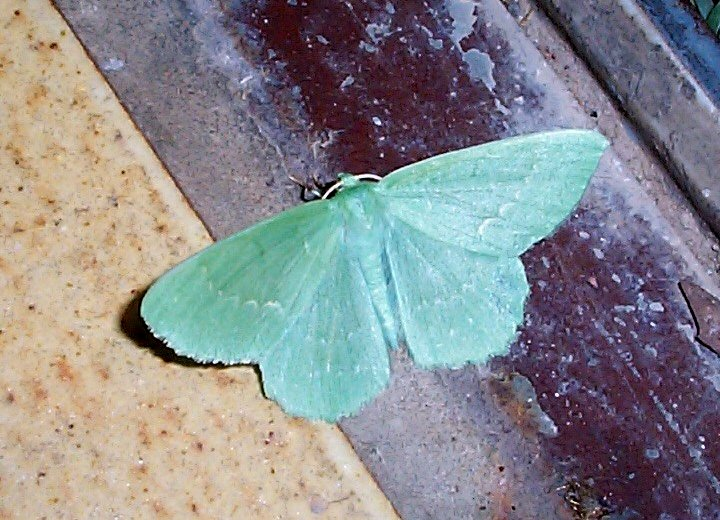
- Large emerald moth (Geometra papilionaria)

Scientific classification
- Kingdom: Animalia
- Phylum: Arthropoda
- Clade: Pancrustacea
- Class: Insecta
- Order: Lepidoptera
- Clade: Macroheterocera
- Superfamily: Geometroidea

Families
- Geometridae; Uraniidae; Sematuridae; Epicopeiidae; Pseudobistonidae

Diversity
- Over 24,000 species

= Geometroidea =

Superfamily of moths

The Geometroidea are the superfamily of geometrid moths in the order Lepidoptera. It includes the families Geometridae, Uraniidae, Epicopeiidae, Sematuridae, and Pseudobistonidae. The Geometroidea superfamily has more than 24,000 described species, making them one of the largest superfamilies inside the order Lepidoptera. The monotypic genus Apoprogones was considered a separate geometroid family of the Apoprogonidae by a minority, but is now subsumed under the Sematuridae.
