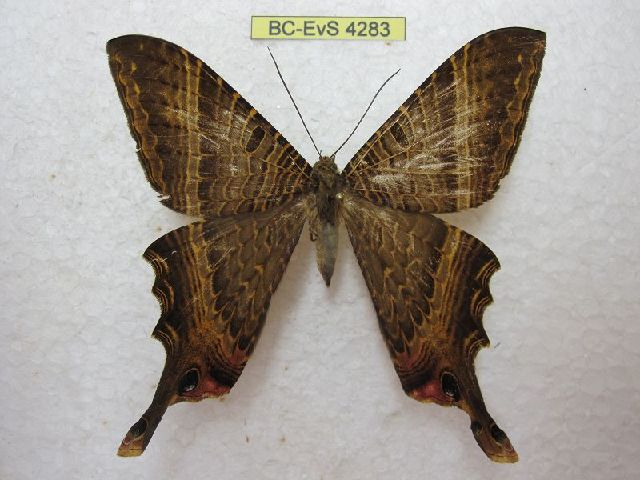

Scientific classification
- Kingdom: Animalia
- Phylum: Arthropoda
- Class: Insecta
- Order: Lepidoptera
- Family: Sematuridae
- Genus: Mania
- Species: M. lunus

Binomial name
- Mania lunus (Linnaeus, 1758)

Synonyms
- Phalaena (Attacus) lunus Linnaeus, 1758; Nothus lunus; Sematura luna; Sematura lunus; Sematura actaeon Felder & Rogenhofer, 1874; Mania caudilunaria Hübner, 1823

= Mania lunus =

Species of moth

Mania lunus is a moth of the family Sematuridae, found in forests of Central and South America, where it occurs from Mexico to Brazil.
