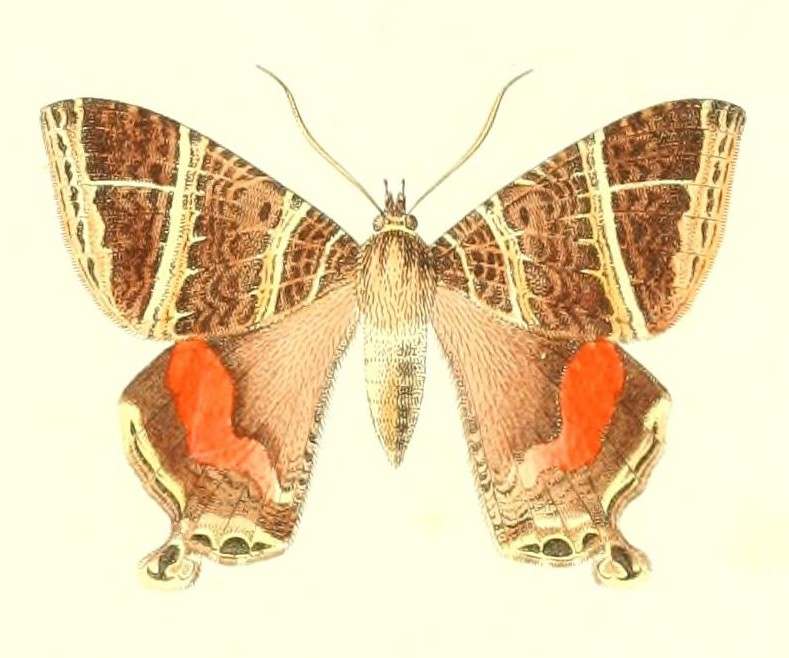

Scientific classification
- Kingdom: Animalia
- Phylum: Arthropoda
- Clade: Pancrustacea
- Class: Insecta
- Order: Lepidoptera
- Family: Sematuridae
- Genus: Homidiana
- Species: H. canace

Binomial name
- Homidiana canace Hopffer, 1856

Synonyms
- Coronidia aeola Westwood, 1879; Coronidia paulina Westwood, 1879; Coronis cana Hopffer, 1856

= Homidiana canace =

Species of moth

Homidiana canace is a moth of the family Sematuridae. It is known from the Neotropics, including Brazil and Colombia.
