= Manya =

Manya is a may refer to:

- Manya, diminutive of the female given name Miriam
- Manya (actress), an Indian actress
- Manya, Victoria, a locality in Australia
- Manya language, spoken in Guinea
- MV Manya, a ship
- Manya Shochat, Zionist

== See also ==
- Mánya (disambiguation)
