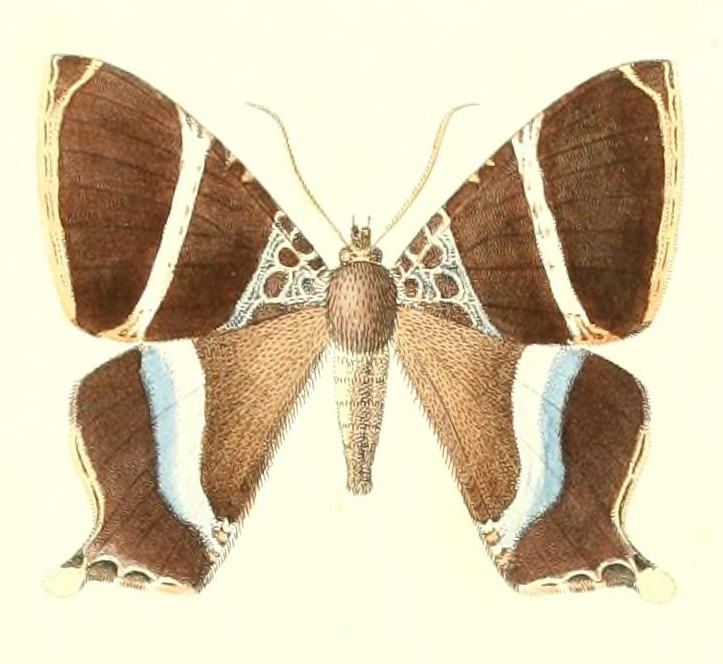

Scientific classification
- Kingdom: Animalia
- Phylum: Arthropoda
- Clade: Pancrustacea
- Class: Insecta
- Order: Lepidoptera
- Family: Sematuridae
- Genus: Coronidia
- Species: C. hyphasis

Binomial name
- Coronidia hyphasis (Hopffer, 1856)

Synonyms
- Coronis hyphasis Hopffer, 1856

= Coronidia hyphasis =

Species of moth

Coronidia hyphasis is a moth of the family Sematuridae. It is known from the Neotropics, including Mexico.
