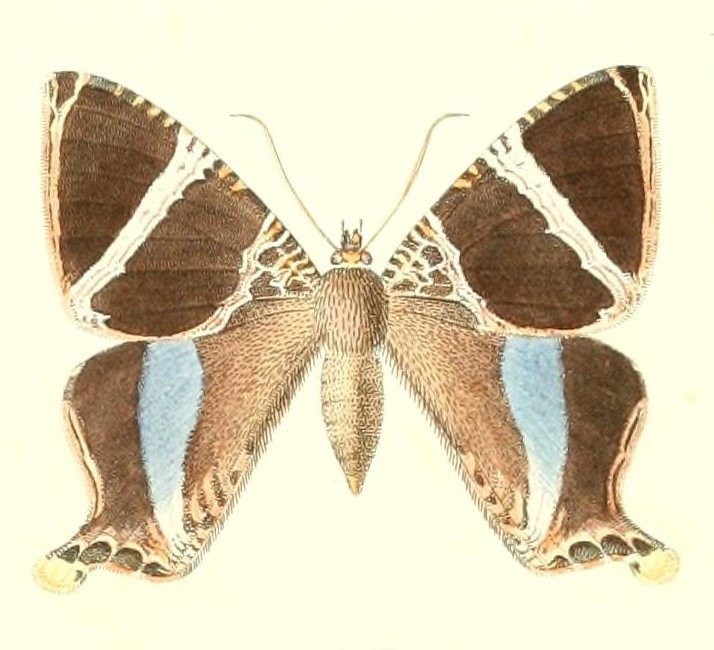

Scientific classification
- Domain: Eukaryota
- Kingdom: Animalia
- Phylum: Arthropoda
- Class: Insecta
- Order: Lepidoptera
- Family: Sematuridae
- Genus: Coronidia
- Species: C. orithea

Binomial name
- Coronidia orithea (Cramer, 1780)

Synonyms
- Phalaena orithea Cramer, 1780; Coronidia hysudrus Hopffer, 1857; Coronidia boreada Westwood, 1879

= Coronidia orithea =

Species of moth

Coronidia orithea is a moth of the family Sematuridae. It is widely distributed in the Neotropics, from Mexico to northern Argentina.

The larvae feed on Phoradendron, possibly Phoradendron tucumanense.
