= Mania (name) =

Mania is a given name and a surname. It may refer to:

- Mania (queen), a 4th-century BC satrap (governor) of Dardanus
- Mavia (queen) (died 425), an Arab warrior-queen whose name is sometimes given as Mania
- Mania Akbari (born 1974), Iranian film director
- Adam Mania (born 1983), Olympic swimmer
- Ryan Mania (born 1989), Scottish jockey
- Antonio Torres (baseball), Colombian baseball manager nicknamed "Manía"
