= Mánya =

Mánya is the Hungarian name for two villages, one in Romania and one in Slovakia:

- Maia village, Bobâlna Commune, Cluj County, Romania
- Maňa village, Nové Zámky District, Nitra Region, Slovakia
