= Syzygium longifolium =

Conservation status
- Near Threatened (IUCN 3.1)

Scientific classification
- Kingdom: Plantae
- Clade: Tracheophytes
- Clade: Angiosperms
- Clade: Eudicots
- Clade: Rosids
- Order: Myrtales
- Family: Myrtaceae
- Genus: Syzygium
- Species: S. longifolium

Binomial name
- Syzygium longifolium (Brongn. & Gris) J.W.Dawson (1999)

Synonyms
- Jambosa longifolia Brongn. & Gris (1865)

Species of plant

Syzygium longifolium is a species of flowering plant that belongs to the family Myrtaceae. It is a large shrub or small tree endemic to New Caledonia. It grows in dense humid tropical forest on volcanic, sedimentary, and ultramafic substrates and in gallery forests along streams up to 900 metres elevation.
