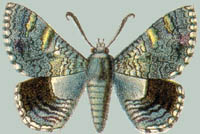

Scientific classification
- Kingdom: Animalia
- Phylum: Arthropoda
- Clade: Pancrustacea
- Class: Insecta
- Order: Lepidoptera
- Family: Sematuridae
- Subfamily: Apoprogoninae
- Genus: Apoprogones; Hampson, 1903
- Species: A. hesperistis

Binomial name
- Apoprogones hesperistis Hampson, 1903

Synonyms
- Genus; Oedimetopia Prout, 1916; Species; Oedimetopia jansei Prout, 1916

= Apoprogones =

Subfamily of moths

Apoprogoninae is a monotypic subfamily of the moth family Sematuridae. Its single genus, Apoprogones, containing a single species, Apoprogones hesperistis, were both described by George Hampson in 1903. It is known from Eswatini and South Africa.

== Taxonomy and systematics ==
Apoprogones hesperistis is presumably the sister taxon of some or all South American Sematuridae but fresh collections are probably needed to use a DNA sequencing approach to this question. The moth measures 4 cm in wingspan and was previously placed in the family Castniidae (Shields and Dvorak, 1979) but it was recognised by Anthonie Johannes Theodorus Janse (Janse, 1932) as belonging to this family.

== Morphology and identification ==
A. hesperistis has strongly clubbed or hooked antennae, like a butterfly, giving it a skipper-like appearance (Shields and Dvorak, 1979), hence the species name. The hindwing is not tailed, unlike Sematurinae which have the veins "M2" and "M3" in the hindwing bearing tails (Minet and Scoble, 1999). The adult male moth has a pair of hair-pencils at the base of the abdomen. On the head (in contrast to Sematurinae) the ocelli are absent and the compound eyes are not hairy; the wing venation differs between subfamilies and the forewing "M1" vein is "free" as opposed to sharing a "stalk" with vein "R1" in Sematurinae (Minet and Scoble, 1999). These and other structural differences have been enough for some authors to consider the African and American groups distinct at family level.

== Conservation ==
Apoprogoninae is an evolutionarily distinctive higher-level taxon which is geographically restricted and apparently not seen since its description in the early 1900s, and therefore merits dedicated conservation attention and new surveys.
