= Lionel Shriver =

American author (born 1957)

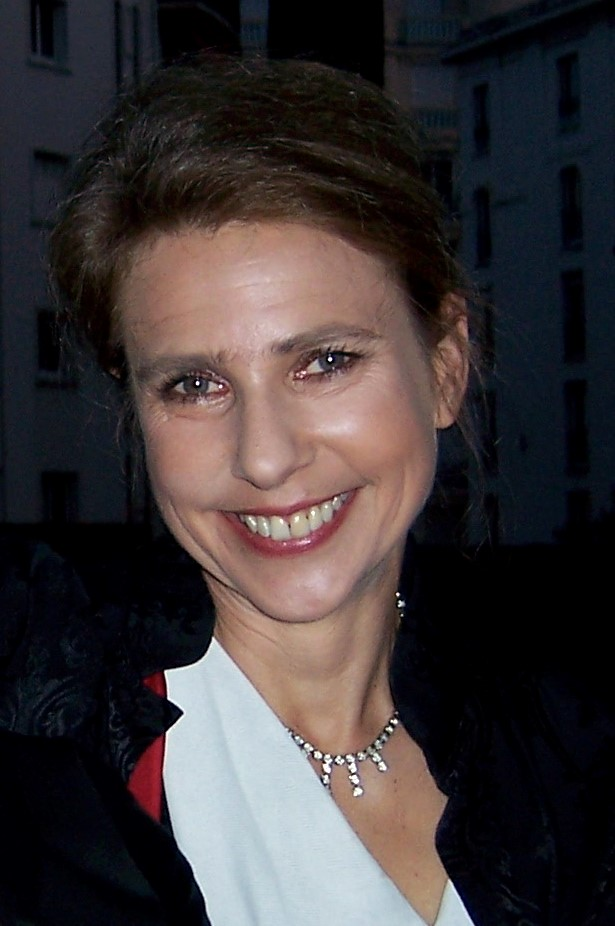
- Shriver in 2011
- Born: Margaret Ann Shriver; May 18, 1957 (age 69); Gastonia, North Carolina, U.S.
- Education: Columbia University (BA, MFA)
- Occupations: Journalist, novelist
- Spouse: Jeff Williams (m. 2003)
- Writing career
- Notable work: We Need to Talk About Kevin

Lionel Shriver (born Margaret Ann Shriver; May 18, 1957) is an American author, journalist, and cultural commentator. Her novel We Need to Talk About Kevin won the Orange Prize for Fiction in 2005.

== Early life and education ==
Shriver was born Margaret Ann Shriver, in Gastonia, North Carolina, to a religious family. Her father, Donald, was a Presbyterian minister who became an academic and president of the Union Theological Seminary in New York; her mother was a homemaker. At age 15, Shriver changed her name from Margaret Ann to Lionel because, being a tomboy, she felt a conventionally masculine name was more appropriate.

Shriver was educated at Barnard College of Columbia University (BA, MFA). She has lived in Israel, Nairobi, Bangkok, Belfast, and London, and currently resides in Portugal. She has taught metalsmithing at Buck's Rock Performing and Creative Arts Camp in New Milford, Connecticut.

== Writing ==
=== Fiction ===
Shriver had written 17 novels, of which seven had been published, before she wrote We Need to Talk About Kevin, which she called her "make or break" novel because of the years of "professional disappointment" and "virtual obscurity" preceding it.

In an interview with Bomb magazine, Shriver listed the various subjects of her novels up to the publication of We Need to Talk About Kevin: "anthropology and first love; rock-and-roll drumming and immigration; the Northern Irish Troubles; demography and epidemiology; inheritance; tennis and spousal competition; terrorism and cults of personality". Rather than writing traditionally sympathetic characters, Shriver prefers to create characters who are "hard to love."

We Need to Talk About Kevin was awarded the 2005 Orange Prize for Fiction. The novel is a study of maternal ambivalence, and the role it might have played in the title character's decision to murder nine people at his high school. It provoked much controversy and achieved success through word of mouth. Shriver said this about the novel's success:

I'm often asked did something happen around the time I wrote Kevin. Did I have some revelation or transforming event? The truth is that Kevin is of a piece with my other work. There's nothing special about Kevin. The other books are good too. It just tripped over an issue that was just ripe for exploration and by some miracle found its audience.

The novel was adapted into the 2011 film of the same name, starring Tilda Swinton and Ezra Miller.

In 2009, Shriver donated the short story "Long Time, No See" to Oxfam's "Ox-Tales" project, four collections of UK stories written by 38 authors. Her story was published in the Fire collection. Shriver's next novel, So Much for That, was published on March 2, 2010. In this novel, Shriver presents a biting criticism of the U.S. health care system. It was named as a finalist for the National Book Award in fiction. Her next work, The New Republic, was published in 2012. It had existed since 1998, but had failed to find a publisher at the time. Her 2013 book, Big Brother: A Novel, was inspired by the morbid obesity of one of her brothers.

In 2014, Shriver won the BBC National Short Story Award for her story "Kilifi Creek".

The Mandibles: A Family, 2029–2047, published in May 2016, is an "acid satire" set in a near future in which the United States is unable to repay its national debt and Mexico has built a wall on its northern border to keep out US citizens trying to escape with their savings. Members of the moneyed Mandible family must contend with disappointment and struggle to survive after losing the inheritance on which they had been counting.

Shriver's 2024 novel, Mania, described in The Observer as a "novel about a cancelled lecturer in a parallel dystopia that prizes ignorance", was published by Borough Press in 2024. Her 2026 novel, A Better Life, deals with an overwhelmed immigration processing system in New York City.

=== Journalism ===
Shriver has written for The Wall Street Journal, the Financial Times, The New York Times, The Economist, Harper's Magazine, and other publications, plus the Radio Ulster program Talkback. In July 2005, Shriver began writing a column for The Guardian, in which she shared her opinions on maternal disposition within Western society, the pettiness of British government authorities, and the importance of libraries (she plans to will whatever assets remain at her death to the Belfast Library Board).

Shriver currently writes for The Spectator, and occasionally contributes to the "Comment" page of The Times.

== Political views and activism ==
In May 2010, Shriver criticized the American health system in an interview while at the Sydney Writers' Festival in Australia, in which she said she was "exasperated with the way that medical matters were run in my country" and considers that she is taking "my life in my hands. Most of all I take my bank account in my hands because if I take a wrong turn on my bike and get run over by a taxi, I could lose everything I have."

As the 2016 keynote speaker at the Brisbane Writers' Festival, Shriver gave a speech critical of the concept of cultural appropriation which led the festival to "pull its links to Shriver's speech and publicly disavow her point of view". Shriver had previously been criticized for her depiction of Latino and African American characters in her book The Mandibles, which was described by one critic as racist and by another as politically misguided. In her Writers' Festival speech, Shriver contested these criticisms of her book, stating that writers should be entitled to write from any perspective, race, gender or background that they choose.

In June 2018, she criticized an effort by the publisher Penguin Random House to diversify the authors that it published and better represent the population, saying that it prioritized diversity over quality and that a manuscript "written by a gay transgender Caribbean who dropped out of school at seven" would be published "whether or not said manuscript is an incoherent, tedious, meandering and insensible pile of mixed-paper recycling". Penguin Random House marketer and author Candice Carty-Williams criticized the statements. As a result of her comments Shriver was dropped from judging a competition for the magazine Mslexia.

Shriver expressed her opposition to woke and identity politics in a 2021 interview with the Evening Standard, stating that "I don't like discrimination of any kind" but adding "there is nothing malign, initially at least, in the impulse to pursue a fairer society. The biggest problem with the 'woke' is their methods – too often involving name calling, silencing, vengefulness, and predation."

Shriver has argued against migration into the UK; in 2021, she wrote an article that stated "For westerners to passively accept and even abet incursions by foreigners so massive that the native-born are effectively surrendering their territory without a shot fired is biologically perverse." She is a patron of the British population growth rate concern group Population Matters, and supported Brexit.

Shriver has been an outspoken critic of what she describes as a "deeply disturbing social obsession with transgenderism," especially following the arrest of Graham Linehan when he arrived at Heathrow airport. In September 2025, two years after she left the UK for Portugal, Shriver said she is now scared to travel to the country "because I'm worried that, given what I have put into print, I could be arrested the next time I come to the UK."

=== American politics ===
Though she has lived abroad in the United Kingdom and Portugal in recent years, Shriver remains a keen commentator on electoral politics in her native country.

In a 2022 letter endorsing Republican Ron DeSantis for the 2024 U.S. presidential election, Shriver described herself as a "lifelong Democrat" and reported voting for Joe Biden in the 2020 U.S. presidential election. In the letter, she documents her shift away from Biden—whose presidency she says was a "White-House-cum-care-home"—and Donald Trump as poor leaders, and praised DeSantis for his handling of the COVID-19 pandemic, banning critical race theory in schools, opposing transgender involvement in women's sports, and passing the Florida Parental Rights in Education Act, while noting that she disagrees with him on abortion.

Shriver also unfavorably compared the charisma of Democratic contenders to the charisma she felt DeSantis possessed. She cited a national "apoplectic loathing" for Vice President Kamala Harris, and categorically rejected both Pete Buttigieg (as a "meek softy") and Gavin Newsom (as a "slick, vain huckster" responsible for turning the state of California into an "open-air pit latrine"). She expressed some appreciation for Amy Klobuchar, though also claimed she was "hardly likeable".

== Personal life ==
Shriver married jazz drummer Jeff Williams in 2003. They moved from the United Kingdom to Portugal in October 2023.

On June 7, 2016, Shriver appeared on the BBC Radio 4 programme My Teenage Diary, during which she read extracts from her journals from the late 1960s and early 1970s and discussed her upbringing and adolescence.

In the summer of 2024, Shriver was diagnosed with Guillain-Barré syndrome, a rare autoimmune disorder, whereby the body attacks its own nervous system and the musculature dissolves. She described the impact in an article for The Free Press: "At first, I could only lift a cup of coffee using both hands. I couldn't turn over in bed. I've had to learn to stand and then to walk, slowly, tremulously, from scratch."

== Bibliography ==
=== Fiction ===
Novels

- The Female of the Species (1987)
- Checker and the Derailleurs (1988)
- The Bleeding Heart (1990)
- Ordinary Decent Criminals (1992)
- Game Control (1994)
- A Perfectly Good Family (1996)
- Double Fault (1997)
- We Need to Talk About Kevin (2003)
- The Post-Birthday World (2007)
- So Much for That (2010)
- The New Republic (2012)
- Big Brother: A Novel (2013)
- Kilifi Creek (2014)
- The Mandibles (2016)
- The Standing Chandelier (2017)
- The Motion of the Body Through Space (2020)
- Should We Stay or Should We Go (2021)
- Mania (2024)
- A Better Life (2026)

Short fiction

- Property – Stories Between Two Novellas, 2018 collection

=== Nonfiction ===
- Abominations: Selected Essays from a Career of Courting Self-Destruction (2022)
