= So Much for That =

2010 novel by Lionel Shriver

First edition (publ. HarperCollins)

So Much for That is a 2010 novel by American author Lionel Shriver. It was shortlisted for the 2010 National Book Award for Fiction.

A social satire, the story follows American entrepreneur Shep Knacker, as he is forced to pay for medical care for his wife, preventing him from following his goal of retiring to a third world country. The novel critiques the various problems created within society by the American medical system and the larger capitalistic economic system.

== Critical reception ==
Reception of the novel was mixed. NPR reviewer Maureen Corrigan is very positive about the novel, praising its language and writing, saying "What's really striking here is the way Shriver's juiced-up language and droll social commentary never flag once throughout this long and deliciously involved novel." Ron Charles of Washington Post Book World, concluded that "So Much for That is a furious objection to watching the dream of health, financial security and old-age companionship wither and die." Telegraph reviewer Lucy Daniel described the novel as successful in critiquing the American health care system, writing "It’s a wonder that subject matter on the surface so bleak can be transformed into something so uplifting."

The Guardian was more mixed, praising the "fast-paced exchanges" within the novel, but noting that Shriver has a "tendency to rely too heavily on dialogue to explain complicated issues such as the workings of the US healthcare system or the intricacies of chemotherapy." While praising the social critiques in the novel, New York Times reviewer Leah Hager Cohen described the novel as "lack[ing] a fullness of wisdom about its characters’ potential for growth."
