= Checker and the Derailleurs =

1988 novel by Lionel Shriver

- First edition cover
- Author: Lionel Shriver
- Language: English
- Publisher: Farrar Straus Giroux
- Publication date: 1988
- ISBN: 0-374-14643-8 (first edition)
- Dewey Decimal: 813.54
- LC Class: PS3569.H742 C47

Checker and the Derailleurs is a 1988 novel by American novelist Lionel Shriver.

The novel, Shriver's second, follows the life of rock drummer Checker Secretti of the Derailleurs band as he goes through a series of relationships and social exchanges. Shriver described the novel as influenced by her father's strongly religious values, with the plot "derived glaringly from the New Testament".

People magazine reviewed the novel in 1988, concluding that "Shriver's breezy, hip style can be irritating; so can her slips into psychobabble. But Checker and the Derailleurs, like its beguiling protagonist, is hard to forget." Publishers Weekly described Checker as "a boy so radiant that his creator has fallen in love with him. And so has the reader."
