= Mania Tower =

High-rise building in Pleven, Bulgaria

Coordinates: 43°25′10″N 24°36′58″E

Mania Tower is a high-rise building located in the centre of Pleven, Bulgaria.

The basement and the 2 lowest floors contain the City Centre Pleven shopping mall, while the tower is used as a business centre. The building was built as Hotel Pleven. In 2006, it was reconstructed and renovated. With its 60 m and 15 storeys, it is the second tallest building in the city after the Pleven TV Tower.
