= The Mandibles =

2016 novel by Lionel Shriver

- Front cover
- Author: Lionel Shriver
- Language: English
- Genre: Speculative fiction
- Published: 2016
- Publisher: HarperCollins
- Media type: Print, e-book, audiobook
- Pages: 402 pages
- ISBN: 978-0-00-756077-6
- OCLC: 978284385

The Mandibles: A Family, 2029-2047 is a 2016 novel by American author Lionel Shriver.

The book takes place in two timelines in a near-future America that is devastated by economic collapse. The story follows the Mandibles, a once wealthy family whose inheritance melts when a supranational currency called the Bancor takes the dollar's place as the international reserve currency and the President responds by taking drastic debt resetting measures. This included gold confiscation and criminalizing the Bancor, causing widespread bankruptcy and societal breakdown.

The first timeline takes place between 2029 and 2032 and shows the family's descent from wealth to survival. The second timeline starts in 2047 and follows the great grandchildren who flee the United States as it adopts increasingly authoritarian measures, for a separatist enclave in Nevada, which is a libertarian society with a flat tax, gold standard, and an emphasis on self reliance. The book serves as both a family saga and a cautionary tale about sovereign debt, currency fragility, and the precariousness of prosperity.

== Background ==
Speaking about the book, Shriver said "I wanted to write a dystopic novel set in the very near future. But that's an established form and I needed to make my project distinctive. I didn't think there had been a lot of novels written about the dystopic economic future. Having, like the rest of us, gone through the whole 2008 financial debacle I thought I had plenty of material. My reading on what happened in 2008 is that we dodged a bullet. I feel as if that bullet is still whizzing around the planet."

== Plot ==
The book is set in the United States in 2029 during a global economic crisis that results in the collapse of the country's economy. This leads to the rise of a supranational currency, the bancor, led by a group of countries. The United States is deliberately excluded from this group, a move that causes President Dante Alvarado to take drastic measures, which include resetting the national debt. All gold now belongs to the government, and owning bancors is considered treasonous. Treasury bonds are now null and void, which results in bankruptcy for many. The novel follows the progress of the affluent Mandible family through this period of economic turbulence. The Mandibles are hit particularly hard by the devaluation of American currency, as they were all expecting to inherit an enormous fortune from the family's patriarch.

The novel is divided into two parts. The first, which takes place between 2029 and 2032, establishes characters from four generations of the Mandible family: the wealthy patriarch; his children, now in their 60s; his young-middle-aged grandchildren and their partners, and his teenage great-grandchildren. The story begins with events just before the Great Renunciation and ends three years later with the family fleeing the chaos and social breakdown around their home in Brooklyn to live in upstate New York. The second part takes place in 2047, and follows the now middle-aged great-grandchildren (and the patriarch's daughter, now in her 90s) as they strike out, once again, to find refuge from an increasingly authoritarian United States government in the separatist enclave of Nevada.

== Reception ==
The novel received mixed reviews. The Irish Times commented that The Mandibles "can be accused of many things. It’s a bubbling, spitting pot of its author’s agendas, but laced with Shriver’s spicy intellect, her unapologetic eye for detail, her suitcase of deviant ideas, it is also a salient, spellbinding read." The Guardian and the Financial Times also reviewed the work, the latter opining that "Shriver’s intelligence, mordant humour and vicious leaps of imagination all combine to make this a novel that is as unsettling as it is entertaining".

In The Independent the book was described as "ambitious, but flawed". The Washington Post and the Economist both criticized its lack of humour and its reliance on expository dialogue. Kirkus Reviews said: "Politically, this may be the only novel Mother Jones and Breitbart can both take an interest in, though it might tire them both" and referred to it as: "An imperfect but savvy commingling of apocalyptic and polemic." The Chicago Review of Books described the novel as a flawed novel that fails to balance its economic satire with compelling character development, saying: "The balance between economic pontificating and character intimacy is less symmetrical. Shriver chocks the first 200-or-so pages with financial talking-head sessions that read more like cut-and-paste jobs than realistic dialogue."
