= Should We Stay or Should We Go =

2021 novel by Lionel Shriver

- Paperback cover
- Author: Lionel Shriver
- Language: English
- Genre: Novel
- Publisher: HarperCollins Publishers
- Publication date: 2021 (hardcover)
- Publication place: United States
- Media type: Print, ebook, audiobook
- Pages: 266
- ISBN: 978-0-06-309425-3

Should We Stay or Should We Go is a satirical novel by Lionel Shriver exploring the themes of ageing, illness and death. It was published in 2021 by HarperCollins.

== Background ==
The novel was written against the background of the COVID-19 pandemic and Shriver's parents' decline into old age as well as her own ill-health and chronic nerve pain. In addition to the end of life, the title Should We Stay or Should We Go refers to Brexit, the United Kingdom's decision to leave the European Union in 2020. Throughout the novel, the two protagonists observe and discuss Brexit, which is happening on the same timeline as their planned suicide pact. They hold opposing views, which allows them to explore both sides of the issue of whether to stay or go.

== Plot ==
Kay and Cyril Wilkinson are a middle-aged couple living in London. Kay works as a nurse and Cyril as a physician for the National Health Service, where they have a first-hand view of issues with the health care system. They raise their three children in a lovingly renovated house in Lambeth. After witnessing Kay's father's slow decline and death, they make a pact to commit suicide when Kay reaches the age of 80.

As they grow older, they are able to make future plans and manage their finances because they know when they plan to die. They can spend their nest egg, take vacations, stay in their long-time home, and reflect on their lives and deaths. On Kay's 80th birthday, they move forward with their suicide pact. It does not go exactly as planned, however. One partner succeeds in ending their life, but the other goes back on the agreement.

After the initial scenario is played out, the subsequent chapters take us through twelve alternative scenarios for the Wilkinsons’ old age and end of life.These include both Kay and Cyril reneging on their pact; Cyril living but then suffering from locked-in syndrome; both being cryogenically frozen and waking up to a very different world; and being committed to an old people's home against their will. In one scenario, the Wilkinsons enjoy a new scientific advancement: ageing and death have been eliminated. They then experience the advantages and disadvantages of living forever.

== Reception ==
Reviewers of Should We Stay or Should We Go often commented on the novel's wit. In The Washington Post, Wendy Smith called it a "sharp-elbowed satire," and Alex Preston of the Financial Times called it "a novel of riotous, occasionally bilious satire." Kirkus Reviews highlighted the book's structure, saying "Shriver has written her best novel since The Post-Birthday World (2007), in no small part because it revisits that book’s alternate-timeline conceit." In The Times (UK), David Grylls wrote "Through the potent spell of Shriver’s language, horror gets alchemised into amusement." And the Financial Times commented on the novel's lack of sentimentality, calling it: "admirably heartless."

== Themes ==
The novel explores issues of ageing and euthanasia, as well as wider issues of life and death. In The New York Times, Walter Kirn summarized the novel as "a novel of issues, a thesis novel concerning euthanasia and medical rationing." He also said: "Yet the novel isn’t really about death... It’s about marriage. The persistence of relationships."
