= Mania (novel) =

2024 novel by Lionel Shriver

- Hardback cover
- Author: Lionel Shriver
- Language: English
- Genre: Novel
- Publisher: HarperCollins Publishers
- Publication date: 2024 (hardcover)
- Publication place: United States
- Media type: Print, ebook, audiobook
- Pages: 277
- ISBN: 978-0-06-3345393

Mania is a satirical dystopian novel by Lionel Shriver, published in 2024 by HarperCollins. The story imagines a social campaign seeking to eliminate the prejudice against low intelligence. It follows the lives of the main character and her best friend as they take opposing views on the issues surrounding the disruptive movement—which allows the author to depict different viewpoints across the political spectrum.

== Plot ==
Pearson Converse is brought up in a family of Jehovah's Witnesses—a Protestant sect with strict codes of behavior. As a child in 1970s Pennsylvania, she rebels against the sect's dogma and her family, and ultimately leaves them as a teenager to live with the Ruth family. The Ruths give her a new view into a life of open thought and academia, and the family's daughter Emory becomes her best friend. Pearson goes to college, becomes an English professor, and starts a family.

In the 2010s, Pearson and Emory discuss a new popular cause called "Mental Parity". The movement decries the advantages given to smart people, and calls for cognitive justice. Over time, schools eliminate grades and assessments; anyone may practice medicine; and smartist TV shows like Sherlock and The Big Bang Theory are cancelled. Pearson is horrified when her son is sent home from school for bullying after he calls another boy's T-shirt "stupid". In Semantic Sensitivity class, students are taught to replace "slow" with "gradual", "dim" with "poorly illuminated", and "dumbwaiter" with "a small elevator used for conveying food and dishes or small goods from one story of a building to another". Pearson is fired from her job after she assigns Dostoevsky's The Idiot to her English class.

Although Pearson and her friend initially mock the movement together, Emory later adopts a position of support for Mental Parity, which boosts her career as a TV commentator. Pearson and Emory fall out. The novel concludes in the 2020s with the pendulum swinging back and the Mental Parity movement falling out of favor.

== Reception ==
Positive reviews included Maureen Corrigan in The Washington Post. Corrigan acknowledges Shriver's position as a contrarian and literary provocateur, and says "Were Shriver not such a superb satirical novelist, we 'woke' types could just ignore her and be done with her offenses and contradictions. But alas, her latest novel, Mania, is one of her best—in part because the subject is one of her queasiest." Writing separately for NPR, Corrigan described Mania as "very funny, occasionally offensive and, yes, smart", while acknowledging what Corrigan considered the novel's elitist undertones.

Negative reviews included Laura Miller in The New York Times, who said, "Tiresome ... As parody goes, this is ham-fisted stuff." Miller wrote that "Mental Parity not only borrows from the left's obsession with egalitarianism, safetyism and language hygiene but also draws on the right's mistrust of expertise and credentialism; it could have bipartisan appeal if it weren't so patently absurd." In The Guardian, Anthony Cummins said, "For all the needle, this novel lacks verve or sass, stretching thinly dramatized ideas—political correctness has gone mad; we should worry about Putin, not pronouns—over nearly 300 pages."

In The Boston Globe, Chris Vogner wrote, "The specifics of Mania are the stuff of bleeding satire, but the novel's guiding concept cuts close to the bone with no anesthesia. Shriver isn't one to tip-toe around her subjects." Publishers Weekly said, "Those sympathetic toward Shriver's anti-groupthink message will find much to enjoy."
