= We Need to Talk About Kevin =

2003 novel by Lionel Shriver

- First edition cover
- Author: Lionel Shriver
- Language: English
- Genre: Epistolary novel
- Publisher: Counterpoint Press
- Publication date: April 14, 2003
- Publication place: United States
- Media type: Print (paperback and hardback)
- Pages: 416
- ISBN: 1-58243-267-8
- OCLC: 50948454
- Dewey Decimal: 813/.54 21
- LC Class: PS3569.H742 W4 2003

We Need to Talk About Kevin is a 2003 novel by Lionel Shriver, first published by Counterpoint, about a fictional school massacre. It is written from the first person perspective of the teenage killer's mother, Eva Khatchadourian, and documents her attempt to come to terms with her emotionally detached son Kevin and the murders he committed, as told in a series of letters from Eva to her husband.

The novel, Shriver's seventh, won the 2005 Orange Prize (now the Women's Prize For Fiction). In 2011 the novel was adapted into a film.

== Background ==
Shriver describes writing the novel at a low point in her career. Her previous book had been rejected, she presented her new manuscript just after the September 11 attacks, and she believed that in such a political climate "something as paltry as a difficult boy and his ambiguous relationship with his mother" would be "irrelevant and, more dangerously, dated".

== Plot ==
The narrator, an Armenian woman named Eva Khatchadourian, has always struggled with the idea of becoming a mother. Giving up her successful career as a writer in order to concentrate on raising her son, Kevin, she finds herself unable to bond with him, and feels that her son dislikes her and may even have psychopathic traits, though his father, Franklin Plaskett, refuses to acknowledge the problem.

In the wake of a school massacre committed by the 15-year-old Kevin, Eva begins writing letters to Franklin, reflecting on her relationship with her husband and her son. She has sold the family home to pay for legal expenses, but in order to be near the facility where Kevin is incarcerated, she still lives in their home town, where she is shunned by the community. She regularly visits Kevin in prison, but their relationship is not close.

As a boy, Kevin is intractable with his mother, yet docile with his father. Eva perceives him as deliberate with his behavior, ranging from manipulative to outright cruel. He uses a childhood incident in which Eva, frustrated at his resistance to toilet training, lashed out and broke his arm, as a form of emotional blackmail, while telling his father the injury was an accident.

Franklin defends him, convinced that his son is normal and just misunderstood. Eva's dislike for her son creates a rift between the married couple. They have a second child, Celia, who is as affectionate to Eva as Kevin was hostile. While Kevin is babysitting Celia, she has an accident involving drain cleaner and is blinded in one eye. Eva is certain that Kevin is responsible for this.

As an adolescent, Kevin discovers an interest in archery, but seems unable to relate to anyone but his sycophantic friend Leonard. He unsettles his peers, disdains convention by wearing uncomfortably undersized clothes, and follows news of school shooters and mass murderers. In high school, Kevin, Leonard, and two others accuse their drama teacher of sexual abuse; Eva is convinced he orchestrated the false accusations. This accusation leads Franklin to ask for a divorce, intending to take custody of Kevin; Kevin overhears them.

Finally, one morning, Kevin shoots Franklin and Celia dead with his crossbow before going to school and trapping seven classmates, a cafeteria worker, and a teacher in a gymnasium before shooting them. Kevin receives a light sentence as he is a minor, and uses a prescription for Prozac to argue that he was experiencing violent psychotic episodes as a side effect.

The novel ends on the second anniversary of the massacre. Kevin is about to turn eighteen and will soon be transferred to Sing Sing, a maximum security prison. Eva asks Kevin for the first time why he committed the murders; he replies that he is no longer sure. They embrace, and Eva concludes that, despite what he did, she loves her son, and awaits his release so that she can welcome him home again.

== Themes ==
In the novel, Shriver deals with themes of: "assumptions about love and parenting", of "how and why we apportion blame", of crime and punishment, forgiveness and redemption. It also deals with the taboo theme of a mother's dislike of her son, and of the possibility that Eva's ambivalence toward maternity may have influenced Kevin's development. Shriver also identifies American optimism and "high-hopes-crushed" as one of the novel's primary themes, as represented by Franklin, the narrator's husband, who serves as "the novel's self-willed optimist about the possibility of a happy family."

== Reception ==
The book won the 2005 Orange Prize and became a "book club favourite," though reviewers were initially polarized. The Guardian called it "misguided and discordant"; although The Observer called it "an elegant exploration of guilt." Kirkus Reviews said of the book: "Eva’s acid social commentary and slightly arch voice only add to the general unpleasantness—which isn’t to say Shriver lacks skill, since unpleasantness appears to be her aim," while The Independent called it: "A dark, witty tale of guilt and redemption."

However, it found success with the public: in 2010 Waterstones readers voted it their favourite Orange Prize winner in the prize's 15-year history.

== Adaptations ==
=== Film adaptation ===
In 2005 BBC Films acquired the rights to adapt the book as a film. Director Lynne Ramsay signed on to direct. It was announced in March 2009 that Tilda Swinton had signed on to star in the film as Eva. Filming began on location in Stamford, Connecticut on April 19, 2010. We Need To Talk About Kevin was screened at the Toronto International Film Festival on September 9 and 11, 2011. John C. Reilly plays Franklin and Ezra Miller plays Kevin. The film premiered In Competition at the 2011 Cannes Film Festival, where it was met with praise from film critics.

=== Radio adaptation ===
From January 7, 2008, the story was serialized on BBC Radio 4 in 10 15-minute episodes and was broadcast daily as the Woman's Hour drama. It starred Madeleine Potter as Eva Katchadourian. Ethan Brooke and Nathan Nolan played Kevin at various ages, while Richard Laing played Franklin Plaskett. It is occasionally repeated on BBC Radio 4 Extra.
