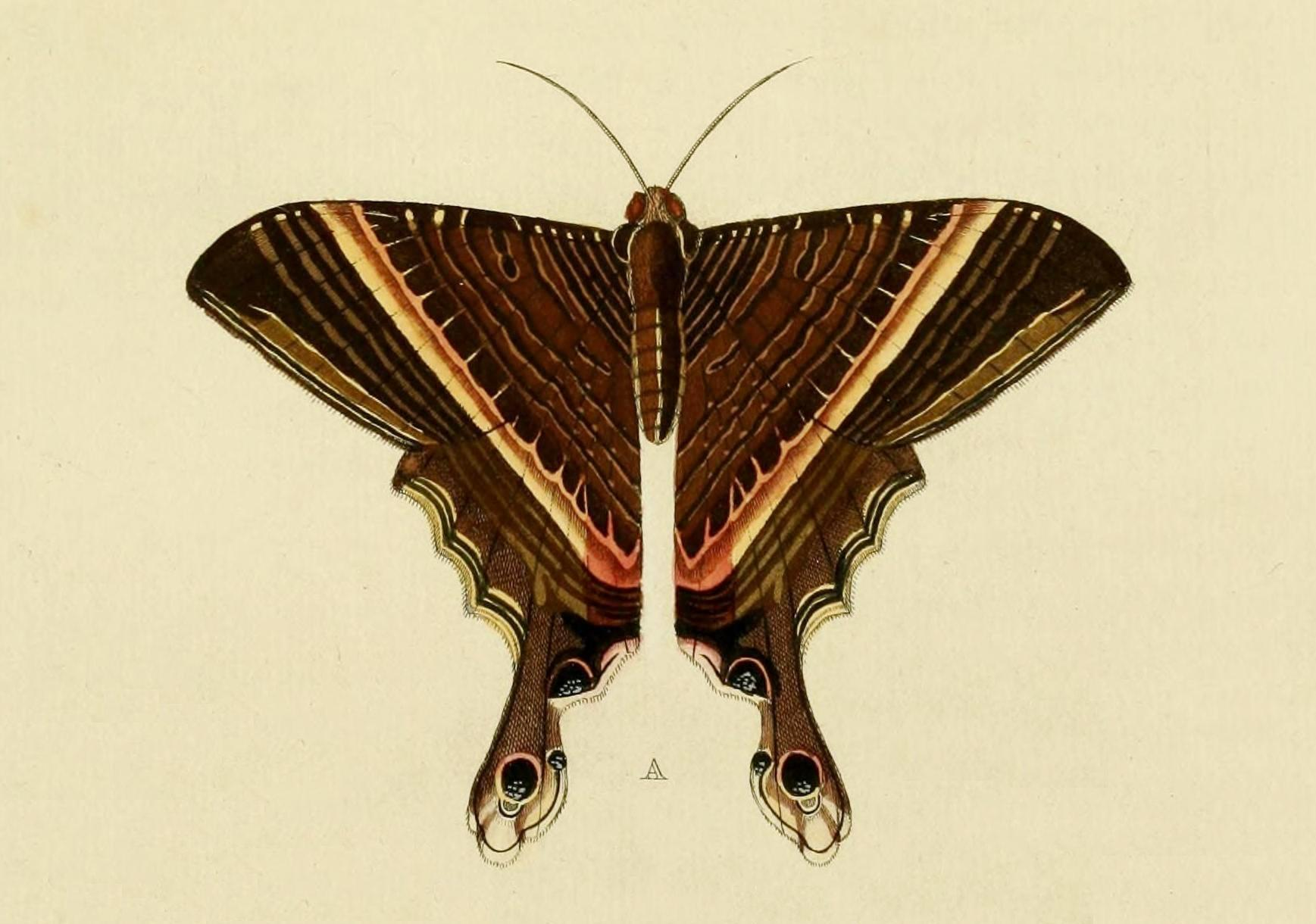
- Mania empedocles

Scientific classification
- Kingdom: Animalia
- Phylum: Arthropoda
- Clade: Pancrustacea
- Class: Insecta
- Order: Lepidoptera
- Superfamily: Geometroidea
- Family: Sematuridae

Subfamilies
- Apoprogoninae; Sematurinae

Diversity
- about 41 species

= Sematuridae =

Family of moths

Sematuridae is a family of moths in the lepidopteran order that contains two subfamilies (Minet and Scoble, 1999).

== Taxonomy, systematics, and identification ==
These are large day- or night-flying moths, usually tailed and similar to Uraniidae in general appearance (except for the genera Apoprogones, Anuropteryx and Lonchotura). The position of this family is not certain amongst the Macrolepidoptera but it is usually considered to belong to the superfamily Geometroidea, whilst the identity of its closest extant relative is under investigation using DNA sequencing. Until recently very little has been known of sematurid biology (but see Sematurinae). The "chaetosemata" of Sematuridae have long setae overhanging the compound eyes, the antennae are thickened towards the often rather clubbed or hooked tip whilst a tympanal organ for hearing is always absent and there are other diagnostic characters in the abdomen (Minet and Scoble, 1999: 305-307; Holloway et al., 2001).

== Distribution ==
Apoprogoninae is represented by a single species in South Africa whilst Sematurinae is represented by about 29 (41 including the genera Anurapteryx and Lonchotura) species in the Neotropics. Such an apparently relictual distribution might relate to the geological split of South America and Africa, but there is as yet no evidence for the age of evolutionary divergence of Neotropical and Afrotropical representatives; moreover, new genetic material would be needed for the South African taxon as well as the American genera Anurapteryx and Lonchotura for a modern molecular approach to this problem to succeed .
