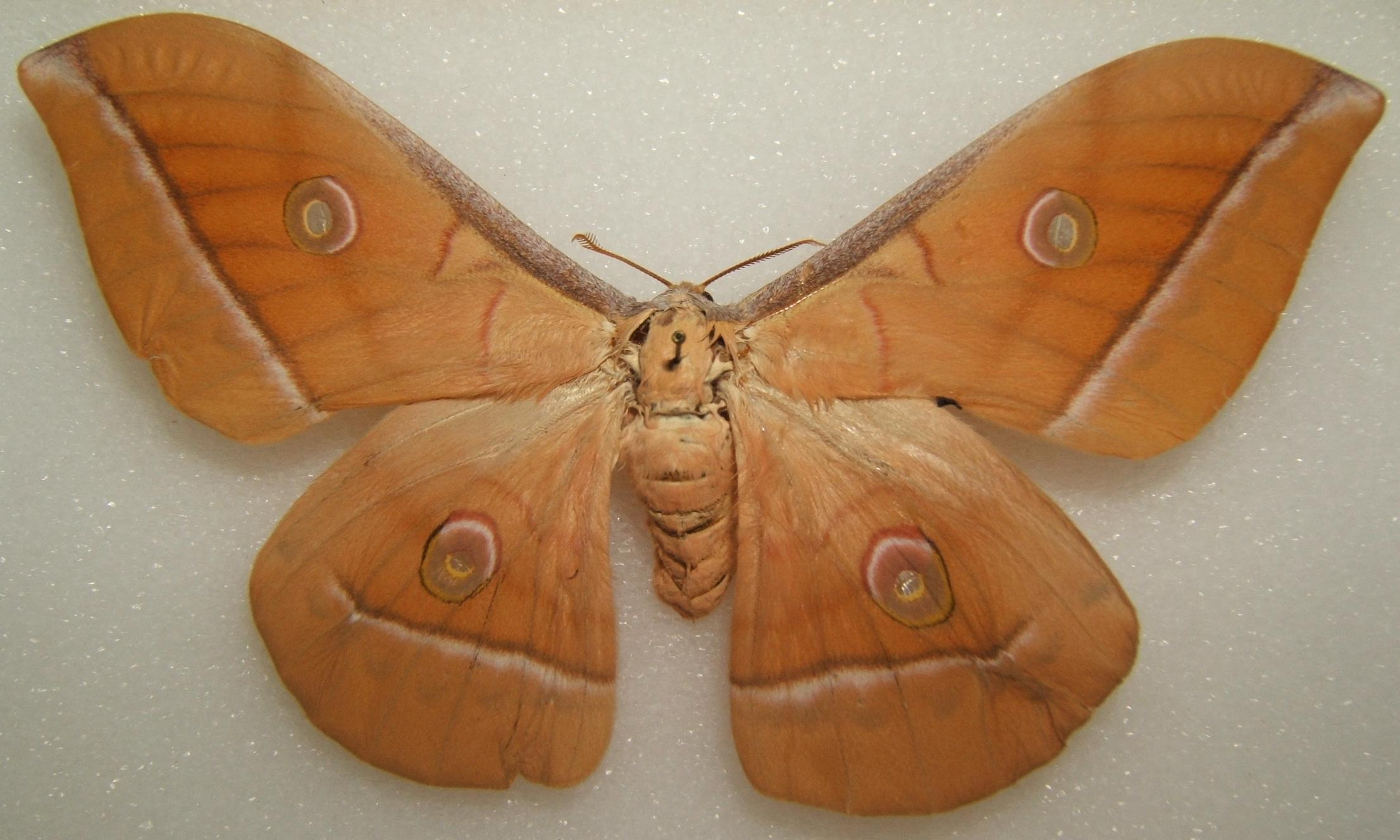

Scientific classification
- Domain: Eukaryota
- Kingdom: Animalia
- Phylum: Arthropoda
- Class: Insecta
- Order: Lepidoptera
- Infraorder: Heteroneura
- Clade: Eulepidoptera
- Clade: Ditrysia
- Section: Cossina; Meyrick, 1907

= Cossina =

Group of insects

Cossina is the name for both a section and subsection of Ditrysian insects in the order containing both butterflies and moths having a dorsal heart vessel. The section named Cossina contains two subsections: one also named Cossina (containing mostly smaller moths in the superfamilies Castnioidea, Cossoidea and Tortricoidea) having pupae with dorsal spines; and subsection Bombycina (containing generally larger sized moths and butterflies in the superfamilies Bombycoidea, Calliduloidea, Cimelioidea, Drepanoidea, Geometroidea, Noctuoidea, Papilionoidea and Uranioidea) having spineless pupae.

== See also ==
- Taxonomy of the Lepidoptera

== Sources ==
- Capinera, John, editor (2008), Encyclopedia of Entomology, 2nd ed., Springer Verlag, New York.
