= Bombycina =

Scientific classification
- Domain: Eukaryota
- Kingdom: Animalia
- Phylum: Arthropoda
- Class: Insecta
- Order: Lepidoptera
- Clade: Ditrysia
- Section: Cossina
- Subsection: Bombycina

Group of insects

Bombycina is the name for a subsection of Ditrysian insects in order containing both butterflies and moths having a dorsal heart vessel. Subsection Bombycina contains generally larger sized moths and butterflies in the superfamilies Bombycoidea, Calliduloidea, Drepanoidea, Geometroidea, Lasiocampoidea, Mimallonoidea, Noctuoidea, and Papilionoidea, having spineless pupae.

== See also ==
- Taxonomy of Lepidoptera
