= List of moths of Australia (Tineodidae) =

Partial list of Australian moths

This is a list of the Australian moth species of the family Tineodidae. It also acts as an index to the species articles and forms part of the full List of moths of Australia.

- Anomima phaeochroa Turner, 1922
- Cenoloba obliteralis (Walker, 1864)
- Epharpastis daedala Meyrick, 1887
- Euthesaura carbonaria Turner, 1922
- Euthesaura glycina Turner, 1922
- Euthrausta holophaea (Turner, 1908)
- Euthrausta oxyprora (Turner, 1908)
- Euthrausta phoenicea (Turner, 1908)
- Oxychirota paradoxa Meyrick, 1885
- Palaeodes samealis Hampson, 1913
- Tanycnema anomala Turner, 1922
- Tineodes adactylalis Guenée, 1854
