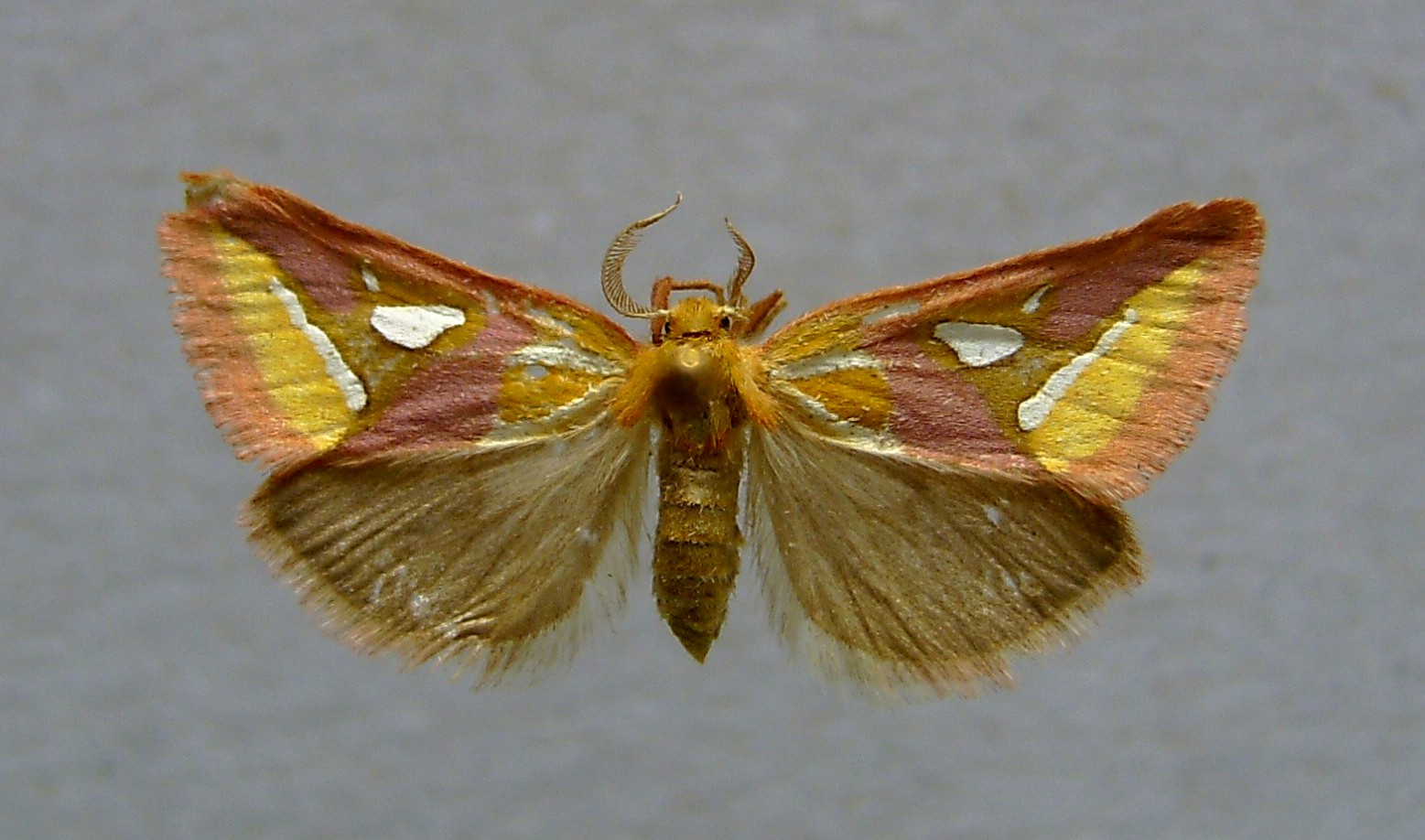
- Axia margarita

Scientific classification
- Domain: Eukaryota
- Kingdom: Animalia
- Phylum: Arthropoda
- Class: Insecta
- Order: Lepidoptera
- Family: Cimeliidae
- Genus: Axia; Hübner, 1821

Synonyms
- Timia Boisduval, 1828; Cimelia Lederer, 1853; Cimetimia Chrétien, 1916

= Axia (moth) =

Genus of moths

Axia, the gold moths, is a genus of moths whose precise relationships within the macrolepidoptera are currently uncertain, but they currently are placed within the superfamily Drepanoidea. Uniquely, they have a pair of pocket-like organs on the seventh abdominal spiracle of the adult moth which are possibly sound receptive organs. They are quite large and brightly coloured moths that occur only in southern Europe and feed on species of Euphorbia. Sometimes they are attracted to light. The genus was first described by Jacob Hübner in 1821.

One species, Epicimelia theresiae, was formerly included in this genus, but has since been recognized as distinct; it represents the only other described genus in the family.

== Species ==
- Axia margarita (Hübner, 1813)
- Axia napoleona Schawerda, 1926
- Axia nesiota Reisser, 1962
- Axia olga (Staudinger, 1899)
- Axia vaulogeri Staudinger, 1892

== Sources ==
- De Freina, J.J. & Witt, T.J, (1987) Die Bombyces und Sphinges der Westpalearktis.; ISBN 3-926285-00-1
- Firefly Encyclopedia of Insects and Spiders, edited by Christopher O'Toole, ISBN 1-55297-612-2, 2002
