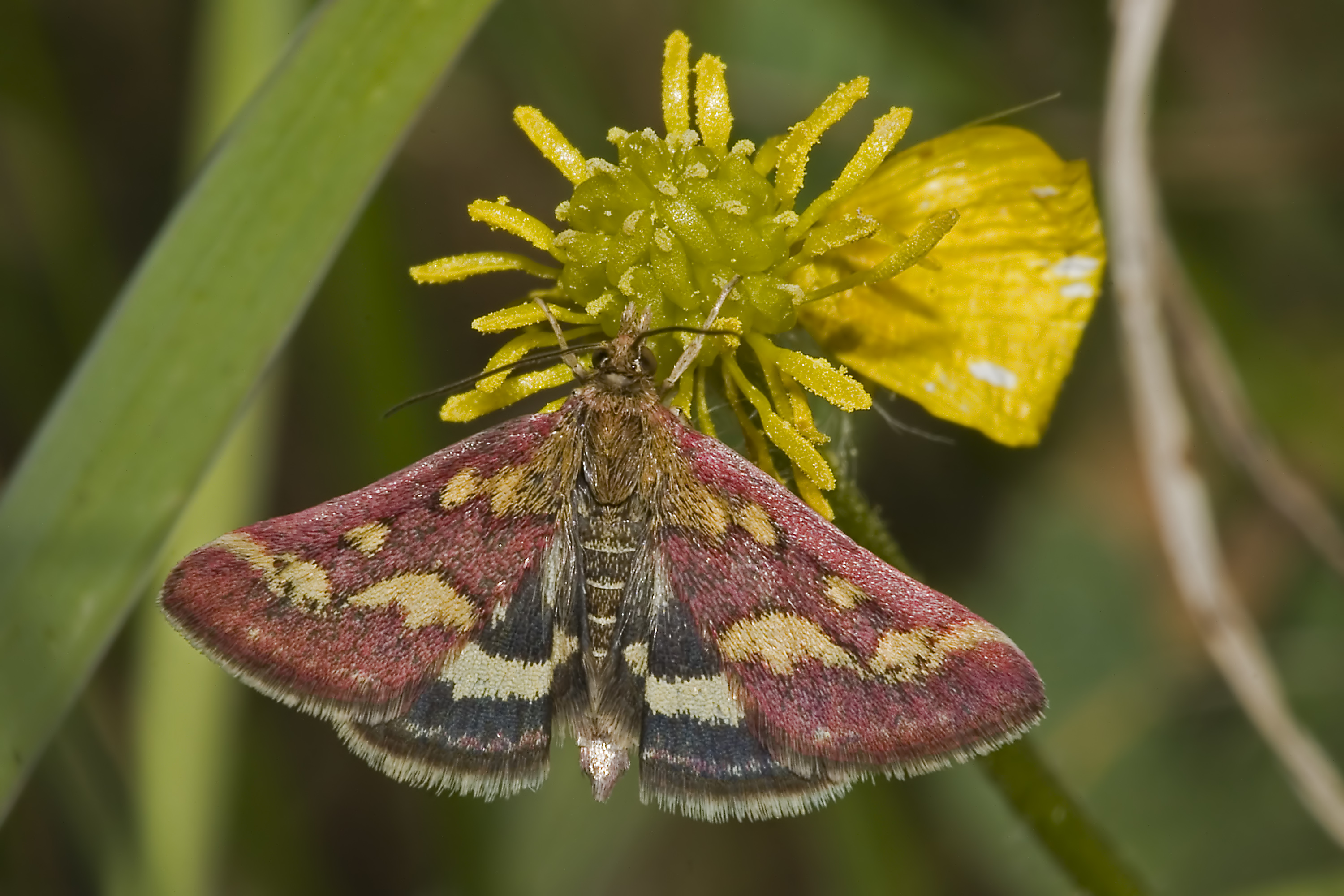
- Pyrausta purpuralis

Scientific classification
- Kingdom: Animalia
- Phylum: Arthropoda
- Clade: Pancrustacea
- Class: Insecta
- Order: Lepidoptera
- Clade: Neolepidoptera
- Infraorder: Heteroneura
- Clade: Eulepidoptera
- Clade: Ditrysia
- Clade: Apoditrysia
- Clade: Obtectomera; Minet, 1986

= Obtectomera =

Clade of macro-moths and butterflies

The Obtectomera is a clade of macro-moths and butterflies, comprising over 100,000 species in at least 12 superfamilies. This clade was initially defined by a pupal stage with the four anterior abdominal segments fused and immobile as the sole synapomorphy, but was later revised to include the modification of the dorsal edge of the pulvillus with a protrusion in the adult.

== Taxonomy ==
The Obtectomera includes the following 12 superfamilies:

- Whalleyanoidea Minet, 1991
- Thyridoidea Herrich-Schäffer, 1846 – picture-winged leaf moths
- Hyblaeoidea Hampson, 1903 – teak moths
- Calliduloidea Moore, 1877 – Old World butterfly-moths
- Papilionoidea Latreille, 1802 – true butterflies
- Pyraloidea Latreille, 1809 – pyraloid moths
- Mimallonoidea Burmeister, 1878 – sack bearers (sometimes included Macroheterocera)
- Macroheterocera Chapman, 1893
  - Drepanoidea Boisduval, 1828 – drepanids
  - Noctuoidea Latreille, 1809 – owlet moths
  - Geometroidea Leach, 1815 – inchworms
  - Lasiocampoidea Harris, 1841 – lappet moths
  - Bombycoidea Latreille, 1802 – bombycoid moths

Some other superfamilies are sometimes included:

- Pterophoroidea Latreille, 1802 – plume moths
- Alucitoidea Leach, 1815 – many-plume moths
- Copromorphoidea [=Carposinoidea] Walsingham, 1897 – fruitworm moths
- Epermenioidea Spuler, 1910 – fringe-tufted moths
- Gelechioidea Stainton, 1854 – case-bearers, twirler moths, curved-horn moths, etc.

The macroheteroceran superfamilies were previously place in the Macrolepidoptera, but recent molecular studies have failed to recover the Macrolepidoptera as a monophyletic group. The latter grouping also included true butterflies (Papilionoidea), New World butterfly-moths (Hedylidae), Old World butterfly-moths (Calliduloidea), and European gold moths (Axioidea).
