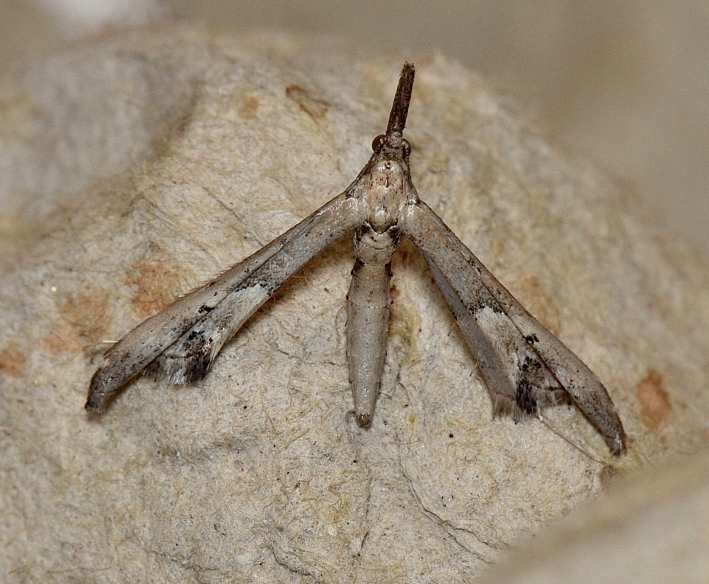
- Tineodes adactylalis, Sandford, TAS, Australia, 5 February 2017

Scientific classification
- Kingdom: Animalia
- Phylum: Arthropoda
- Clade: Pancrustacea
- Class: Insecta
- Order: Lepidoptera
- Infraorder: Heteroneura
- Clade: Eulepidoptera
- Clade: Ditrysia
- Clade: Apoditrysia
- Superfamily: Alucitoidea
- Family: Tineodidae; Meyrick, 1885

Diversity
- 12 genera, about 20 species

Synonyms
- Oxychirotidae Meyrick, 1885

= Tineodidae =

False plume moths

Family of moths

The Tineodidae or false plume moths are a family of moths with in some cases unusually modified wings. As with most Pterophoridae (plume moths), the wings of several Tineodidae are longitudinally split. In insects with divided wings Pterophoridae have two or three segments in the forewing and three in the hindwing, but Tineodidae have only two segments in each wing.

This is a small family, with about a global total of 20 species described to date, although ome undescribed species are believed to exist. They seem to be of Australian origin, where they are most diverse, but range through the Wallacea to Southeast and South Asia, and into the Pacific to the Marquesas Islands.

== Description and ecology ==
These moths are usually small (with wingspans around 1–2 cm/less than 1 inch) and brownish in color. They have large compound eyes, thread-like antennae, and prominent labial palps. The body is slender, and the legs bear large spines.. The amount of wing modification varies in this family. Some genera (e.g. Cenoloba, Oxychirota and Tanycnema) resemble plume moths (superfamily Pterophoroidea), hence the common name "false plume moths". Others have little- or almost unmodified wings, and in some cases (e.g. Tineodes) at a casual glance look like snout moths (family Pyralidae). The forewings may be simply drawn out to a slim point, or deeply divided into two narrow lobes. The hindwings are typically quite short, and may also be divided into two lobes.

Feeding habits of the caterpillar larvae are not well known; while they all seem to feed on eudicots, there is no obvious preference for a particular lineage of hostplants. Some larvae live in shelters formed by joining adjacent leaves of the hostplant with silk. Others such as Cenoloba obliteralis burrow into fruits or seeds.

== Systematics and taxonomy ==
The relationships of this group are disputed, and for a long time these moths were not recognised to share a lineage, being treated as unusual Pyralidae (snout moths) or Pterophoroidea (plume moths). Only in the late 19th century was their distinctness realized, although they were not yet considered to be a monophyletic group. Rather, the more unusual forms were treated as a distinct family Oxychirotidae which was subsequently merged into the Tineodidae – a family originally established for the more conventional-looking false plume moths – when it became clear that the two groups are very close relatives.

Tineodidae were subsequently united with the many-plumed moths (family Alucitidae) in the superfamily Alucitoidea. More recent research has indicated that these two groups are actually polyphyletic with regard to each other, and Tineodidae is now synonymised with Alucitidae.

The Pterophoroidea have often been considered the closest living relatives of the Alucitoidea, an idea reinforced by strong similarities between Tanycnema and Agdistopis which was regarded as the basal plume moth genus.

However, recent molecular work has not recovered this relationship and it is now believed that the closest living relatives of the Alucitidae are the Carposinoidea (fruitworm moths) and Epermenioidea (fringe-tufted moths).

== Genera ==
The genera presently placed here, sorted alphabetically, are:

- Anomima Turner, 1922
- Carcantia Walker, 1859
- Cenoloba Walsingham, 1885
- Epharpastis Meyrick, 1887
- Euthesaura Turner, 1922
- Euthrausta Turner, 1922
- Neoxychirota Clarke, 1986
- Oxychirota Meyrick, 1885
- Palaeodes Hampson, 1913
- Tanycnema Turner, 1922
- Tephroniopsis Amsel, 1961
- Tineodes Guenée in Boisduval & Guenée, 1854
