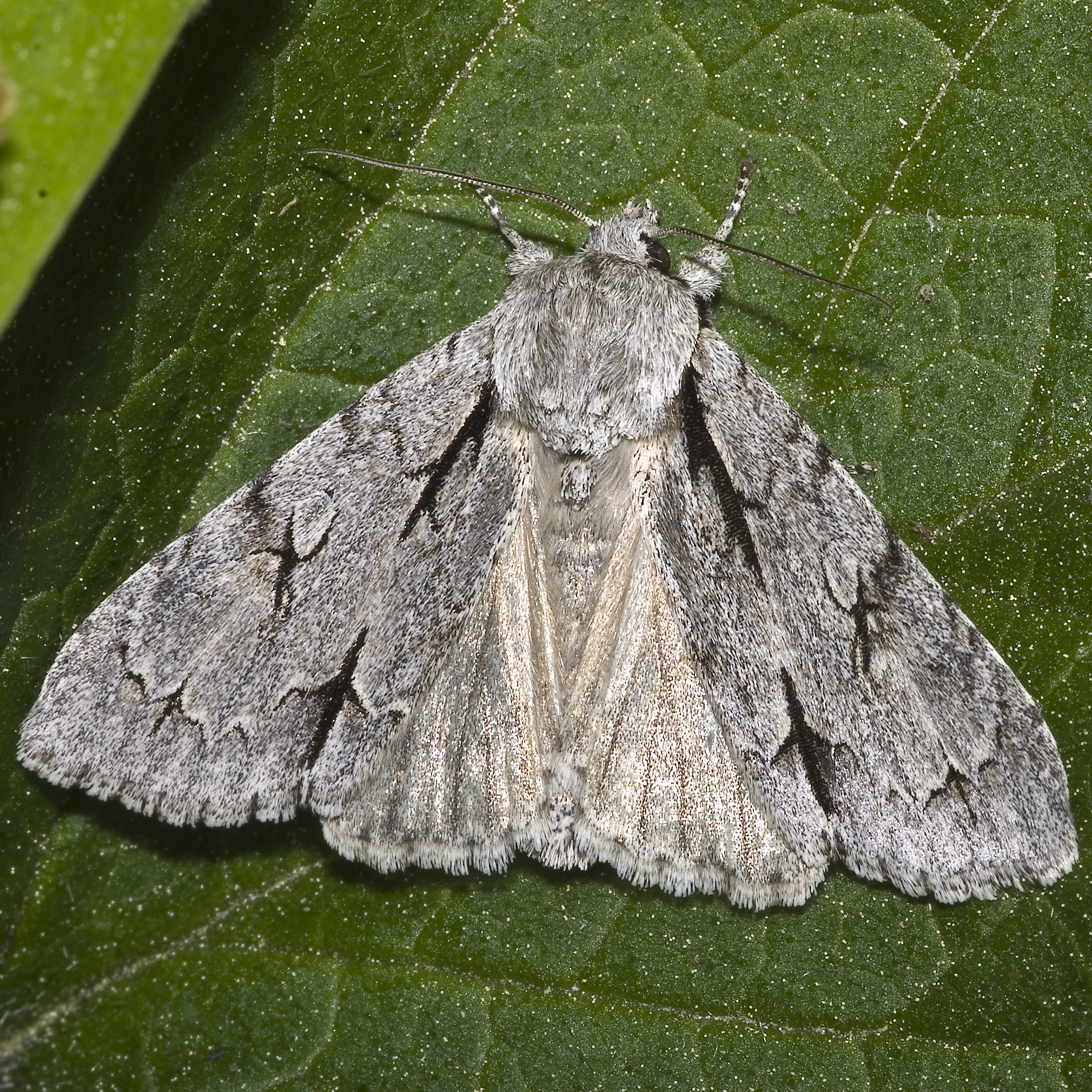
- Grey dagger, Acronicta psi

Scientific classification
- Kingdom: Animalia
- Phylum: Arthropoda
- Class: Insecta
- Order: Lepidoptera
- Clade: Ditrysia
- (unranked): Macrolepidoptera

Superfamilies
- See text

= Macrolepidoptera =

Order of insects

Macrolepidoptera is a group within the insect order Lepidoptera. Traditionally used for the larger butterflies and moths as opposed to the "microlepidoptera", this group is artificial. However, it seems that by moving some taxa about, a monophyletic macrolepidoptera can be easily achieved. The two superfamilies Geometroidea and Noctuoidea account for roughly one-quarter of all known Lepidoptera.

== Taxonomy ==
In the reformed macrolepidoptera, the following superfamilies are included:

- Mimallonoidea – sack bearers
- Lasiocampoidea – lappet moths
- Bombycoidea – bombycoid moths
- Noctuoidea – owlet moths
- Drepanoidea – drepanids
- Geometroidea – inchworms
- Calliduloidea – Old World butterfly-moths
- Papilionoidea – butterflies

The last two or three superfamilies comprised the Rhopalocera, or butterflies. More recent taxonomic treatments usually include all butterflies in an expanded Papilionoidea.

Subsequent molecular studies have failed to recover the macrolepidoptera as a monophyletic group, but have found a well supported clade of moths that excludes the butterflies and some other moth superfamilies. This macro-moth clade, named Macroheterocera, contains the following five or six superfamilies:

- Mimallonoidea – sack bearers (sometimes included in basal position)
- Drepanoidea – drepanids
- Noctuoidea – owlet moths
- Geometroidea – inchworms
- Lasiocampoidea – lappet moths
- Bombycoidea – bombycoid moths
