= Lacosoma arizonicum =

Scientific classification
- Domain: Eukaryota
- Kingdom: Animalia
- Phylum: Arthropoda
- Class: Insecta
- Order: Lepidoptera
- Family: Mimallonidae
- Genus: Lacosoma
- Species: L. arizonicum

Binomial name
- Lacosoma arizonicum Dyar, 1898

Moth species in family Mimallonidae

Lacosoma arizonicum, the southwestern sack-bearer moth, is a species of moth in the family Mimallonidae and one of four species of sack-bearers occurring north of Mexico. Its type locality is the Chiricahua Mountains of Arizona. The species was first described by Harrison Gray Dyar Jr. in 1898 from a single male specimen and has Hodges number 7660.

== Behavior and appearance ==
=== Caterpillars ===
The larval hostplant are species of oak (Quercus), with four species of oak observed as host plants in the wild: Quercus arizonica, Quercus emoryi, Quercus gambelii and Quercus hypoleucoides. In addition, captive larvae have also been successfully raised on Quercus virginiana. As with other species of Mimallonidae, the larvae feed concealed. Young larvae feed under a layer of silk netting, mixed with frass, covering part of the leaf on which they're feeding. Later instars form a case by sticking multiple leaves together with silk, which eventually becomes a compact and rigid tube-shaped case with an opening on both sides. Larvae overwinter within this case prior to pupation.

Larvae have an enlarged head and a flattened, armored anal plate, both of which are characteristic for species of Mimallonidae. Final instar larvae have a brown base color with yellow stripe markings, with some variation in exact shade and shape of the markings. They resemble those of Lacosoma chiridota, but with more pronounced markings due to a higher contrast between marking and base color.

=== Adult ===
Wings are pale brown, shaded rosy pink on the basal half, and have an obscure dot on both wings as well as a thin, very slightly curved, brown line. Wingspan is approximately 29 mm. Adults are most commonly on wing during June to August.
