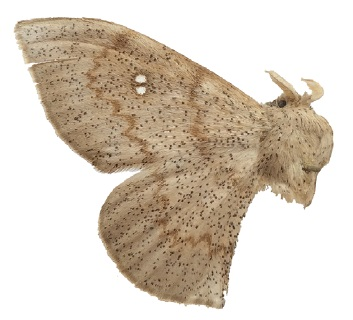

Scientific classification
- Domain: Eukaryota
- Kingdom: Animalia
- Phylum: Arthropoda
- Class: Insecta
- Order: Lepidoptera
- Family: Mimallonidae
- Genus: Eadmuna
- Species: E. pulverula

Binomial name
- Eadmuna pulverula (Schaus, 1896)

Synonyms
- Perophora pulverula Schaus, 1896; Cicinnus pulverula

= Eadmuna pulverula =

Moth species in family Mimallonidae

Eadmuna pulverula is a species of moth of the family Mimallonidae. It is found in Brazil, where it has only been recorded from São Paulo.

The length of the forewings is about 24 mm. The forewings are similar to those of the females of Eadmuna paloa, but with a slightly more pronounced apex and overall darker coloration and heavier speckling due to a higher number of petiolate scales. The hyaline discal mark is smaller. The postmedial line is present, darker, thicker, brown, dentate and narrowly interrupted by veins. There is a dark wedge where the postmedial line meets the costa. The antemedial lines are present, bilobed and B-shaped, but straighter. The hindwings have similar coloration as the forewings, but are lighter overall and the anal angle is accentuated. The postmedial line is dentate, dark, well pronounced, narrowly interrupted by veins and slightly lighter than that of the forewings. There are no hyaline patches.
