= Axia vaulogeri =

Scientific classification
- Domain: Eukaryota
- Kingdom: Animalia
- Phylum: Arthropoda
- Class: Insecta
- Order: Lepidoptera
- Family: Cimeliidae
- Genus: Axia
- Species: A. vaulogeri

Binomial name
- Axia vaulogeri Staudinger, 1892

Synonyms
- Axia ernestina Turati, 1934; Axia vaulogeri f. cannella Marten, 1937; Cimelia vaulogeri thamii Rungs, 1947; Cimelia vaulogeri f. pudipunda Rungs, 1947; Axia vaulogeri iblis Rungs, 1948; Axia vaulogeri asba Rungs, 1981

Species of moth

Axia vaulogeri is a species of moth of the family Cimeliidae first described by Otto Staudinger in 1892. It is found in North Africa, including Algeria, Morocco and Libya.

The larvae feed on Euphorbia terracina and Euphorbia medicaginea.
