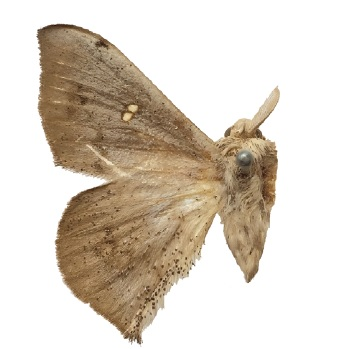

Scientific classification
- Domain: Eukaryota
- Kingdom: Animalia
- Phylum: Arthropoda
- Class: Insecta
- Order: Lepidoptera
- Family: Mimallonidae
- Genus: Eadmuna
- Species: E. esperans

Binomial name
- Eadmuna esperans (Schaus, 1905)

Synonyms
- Cicinnus esperans Schaus, 1905; Eadmuna esperanza

= Eadmuna esperans =

Moth species in family Mimallonidae

Eadmuna esperans is a species of moth of the family Mimallonidae. It is found in south-eastern and southern Brazil, where it has been recorded from Espírito Santo, Rio de Janeiro, São Paulo, Santa Catarina and Rio Grande do Sul.

The length of the forewings is 17–20 mm. The forewings are light silvery brown, suffused with darker brown postmedially except near the apex. There is a weakly pronounced hyaline discal spot which is yellowish opaque rather than clear due to a covering of yellowish scales. The postmedial line is bulging in the costal half, scalloped, narrowly interrupted by the veins and weaker on the costal third except for a dark wedge on the costa. The hindwings have a similar coloration and pattern as the forewings, though the maculation is usually somewhat fainter and there is no hyaline discal spot.
