= European gold moth =

Axia olga

Scientific classification
- Kingdom: Animalia
- Phylum: Arthropoda
- Class: Insecta
- Order: Lepidoptera
- Family: Cimeliidae
- Genus: Axia
- Species: A. olga

Binomial name
- Axia olga (Staudinger, 1899)

Synonyms
- Aria olga Staudinger, 1899

Species of moth

Axia olga, the European gold moth, is a cimeliid moth found in Armenia and Russia. The species was first described by Otto Staudinger in 1899.
