= Silk moth =

Silk moth may refer to

- Moths that produce silk in their larval stage, including many Saturniidae, Bombycidae, and Apatelodidae moths
  - The moth superfamily Bombycoidea, in contrast to other silk-producing moth groups
    - The moth family Bombycidae, in contrast to other silk-producing moth families
      - The species Bombyx mori in particular, the domesticated species used in commercial production of silk

== See also ==
- Saturniidae, a family of moths including emperor moths, royal moths, and giant/wild silk moths
- Apatelodidae, a family of American silkworm moths
