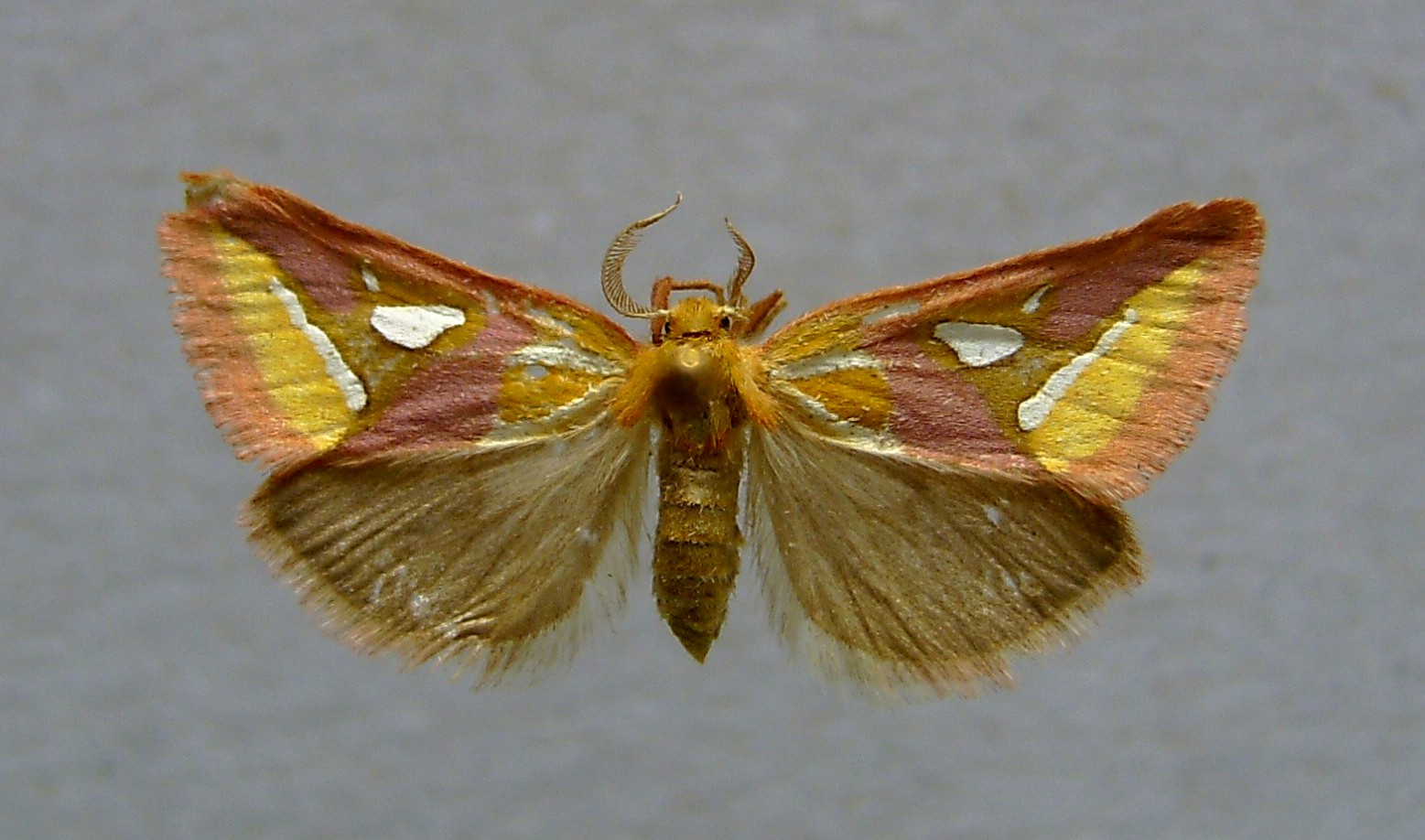

Scientific classification
- Kingdom: Animalia
- Phylum: Arthropoda
- Class: Insecta
- Order: Lepidoptera
- Family: Cimeliidae
- Genus: Axia
- Species: A. margarita

Binomial name
- Axia margarita (Hübner, 1813)

Synonyms
- Noctua margarita Hübner, 1813; Cimelia andalusica Marten, 1934

= Axia margarita =

Species of moth

Axia margarita is a moth of the family Cimeliidae first described by Jacob Hübner in 1813. It is found in Morocco, Spain, Portugal, southern France, Istria and southern Carniola.

The wingspan is 22–28 mm. Adults are mainly on wing during the day. There are two generations per year, with adults on wing from April to October.

The larvae feed on various species of spurge (Euphorbia species).

== Subspecies ==
- Axia margarita margarita
- Axia margarita andalusica (Marten, 1934) (Morocco and Andalusia)

== Life and reproduction ==
The moths fly mainly during the day and produce two generations per year, between April and October. They rest with their wings folded roof-like on the lower stems of their forage plants, where their colouring allows them to blend in. The silvery-white spot in the middle of the front wings resembles a dewdrop, making them almost invisible. They only occasionally visit artificial light sources. The caterpillars feed on various species of spurge (Euphorbia).
