= Axia napoleona =

Scientific classification
- Domain: Eukaryota
- Kingdom: Animalia
- Phylum: Arthropoda
- Class: Insecta
- Order: Lepidoptera
- Family: Cimeliidae
- Genus: Axia
- Species: A. napoleona

Binomial name
- Axia napoleona Schawerda, 1926

Species of moth

Axia napoleona is a species of moth of the family Cimeliidae first described by Schawerda in 1926. It is found on Corsica.

The larvae feed on Euphorbia insularis.
