= Druentica inscita =

Scientific classification
- Kingdom: Animalia
- Phylum: Arthropoda
- Clade: Pancrustacea
- Class: Insecta
- Order: Lepidoptera
- Family: Mimallonidae
- Genus: Druentica
- Species: D. inscita

Binomial name
- Druentica inscita (Schaus, 1890)

Synonyms
- Druentia inscita (Schaus, 1890)

Moth species in the family Mimallonidae

Druentica inscita is a moth of the family Mimallonidae. It is native to Mexico, and was thought to have been introduced to Hawaii for biological control of Clidemia hirta. However, recent research has suggested that the species introduced to Hawaii was misidentified, and is now known to be Druentica coralie (Herbin, 2016).

The larvae cut and fold the leaves of Clidemia hirta and Miconia acinodendrum to form a feeding shelter. They are green with brown stripes and are about 50 mm long.
