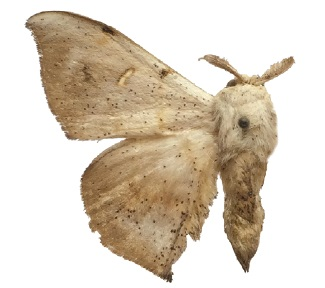

Scientific classification
- Domain: Eukaryota
- Kingdom: Animalia
- Phylum: Arthropoda
- Class: Insecta
- Order: Lepidoptera
- Family: Mimallonidae
- Genus: Eadmuna
- Species: E. guianensis

Binomial name
- Eadmuna guianensis St Laurent & Dombroskie, 2015

= Eadmuna guianensis =

Moth species in family Mimallonidae

Eadmuna guianensis is a species of moth of the family Mimallonidae. It is found in Guyana and French Guiana, where it is found in Amazon rainforests.

The length of the forewings is 18–20 mm. The forewings are brown and silvery grey, the brown colour is especially predominant distally from the thorax, with less extensive speckling due to a relative lack of dark, petiolate scales. The discal spot is not prominent, elongated, hyaline and yellowish opaque. The postmedial line is bulging in the costal half, scalloped, narrowly interrupted by veins and weaker on the costal third except for a dark wedge on the costa. The antemedial line is weak with dark chevron at the costal margin. The hindwings have a similar coloration as the forewings. The postmedial line is present, usually well developed, roughly parallel to the outer margin, though angled slightly more inward on the inner half than in related species.
