= Axia nesiota =

Scientific classification
- Kingdom: Animalia
- Phylum: Arthropoda
- Class: Insecta
- Order: Lepidoptera
- Family: Cimeliidae
- Genus: Axia
- Species: A. nesiota

Binomial name
- Axia nesiota Reisser, 1962

Species of moth

Axia nesiota is a species of moth of the family Cimeliidae first described by Hans Reisser in 1962. It is found on Crete and in mainland Greece.

The larvae feed on Euphorbia species.
