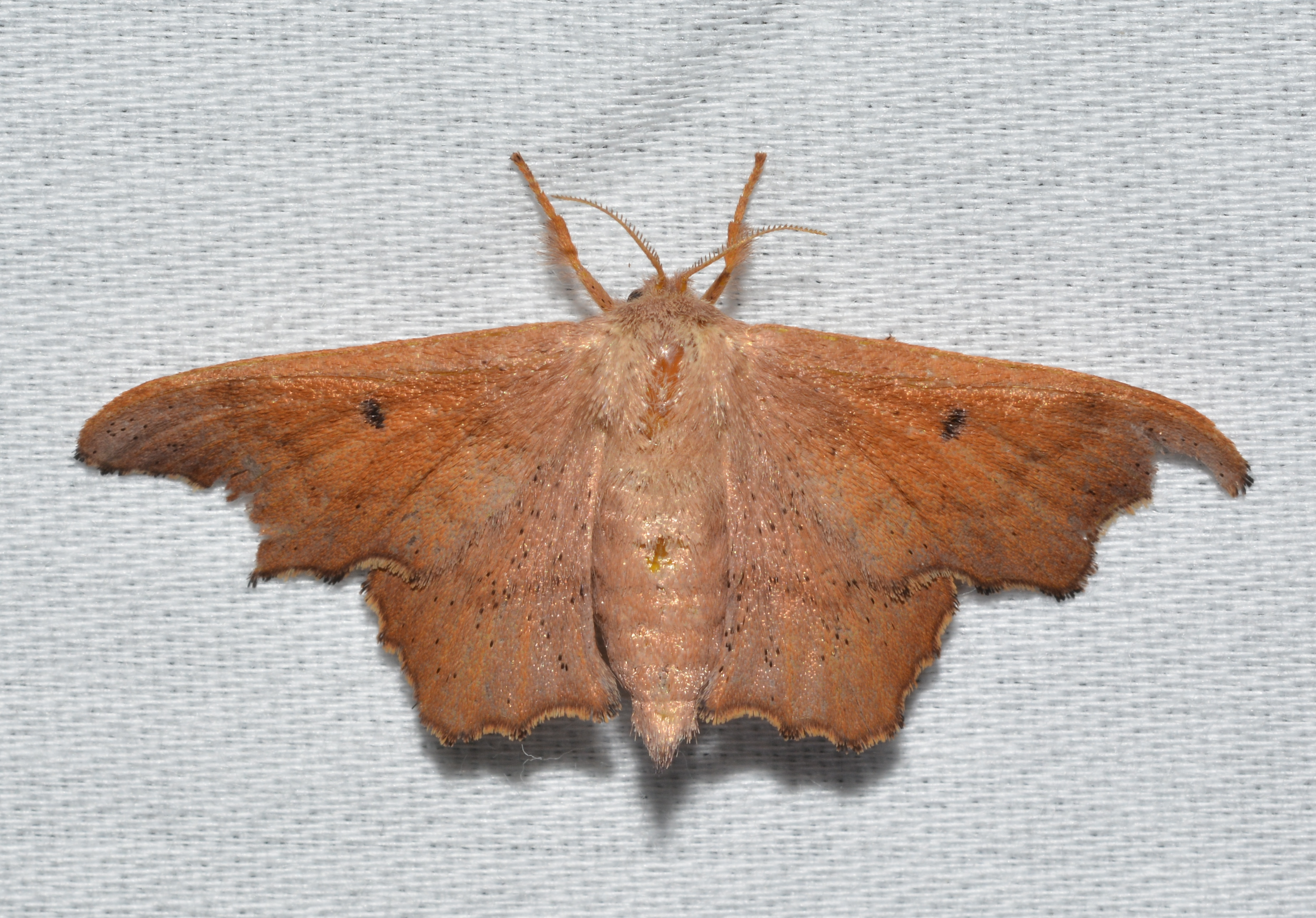

Scientific classification
- Domain: Eukaryota
- Kingdom: Animalia
- Phylum: Arthropoda
- Class: Insecta
- Order: Lepidoptera
- Family: Mimallonidae
- Genus: Lacosoma
- Species: L. chiridota

Binomial name
- Lacosoma chiridota Grote, 1864

= Lacosoma chiridota =

Moth species in family Mimallonidae

Lacosoma chiridota, the scalloped sack-bearer, is a species of sack-bearer moth in the family Mimallonidae.

The MONA or Hodges number for Lacosoma chiridota is 7659.

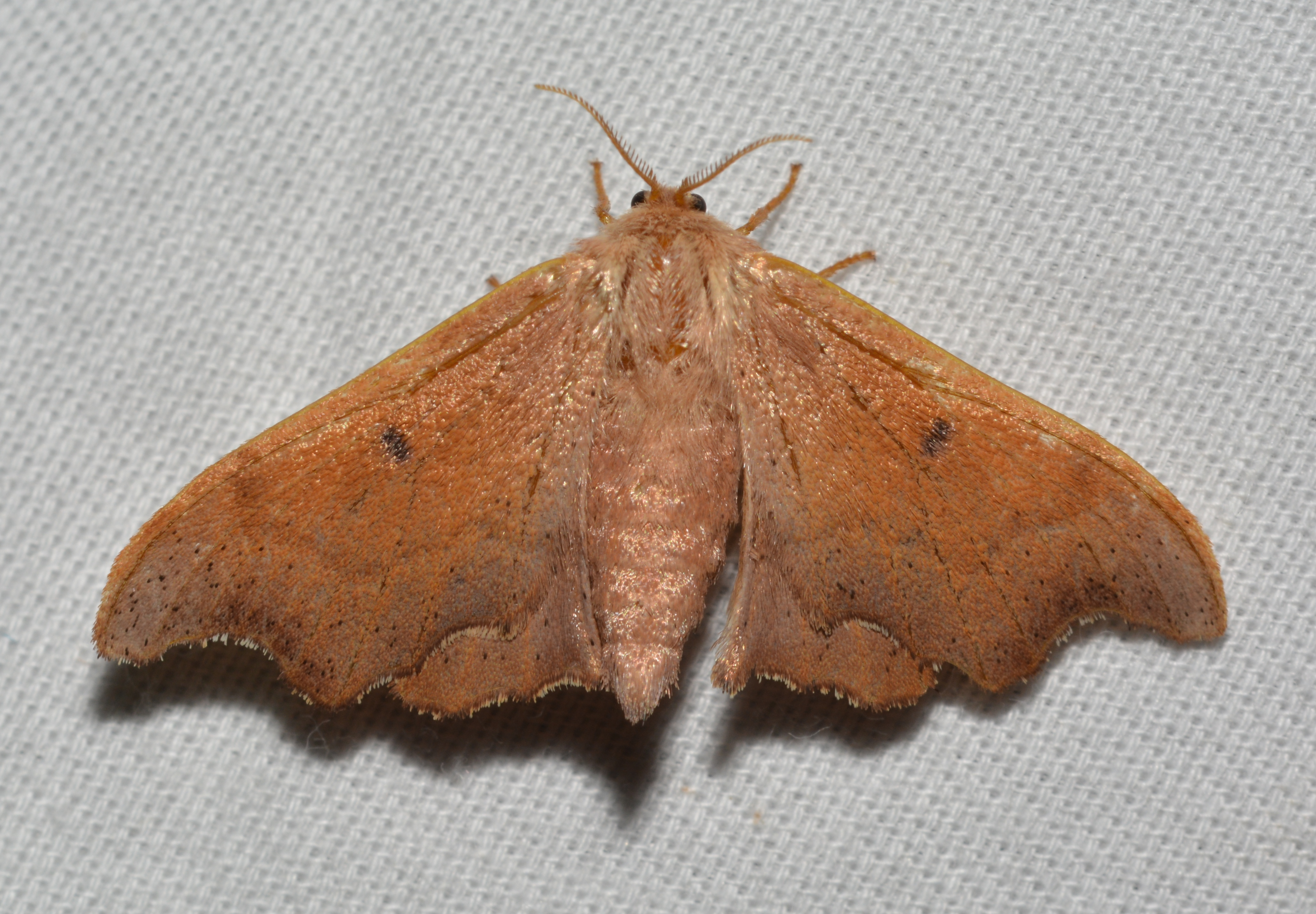
Scalloped sack-bearer, Lacosoma chiridota

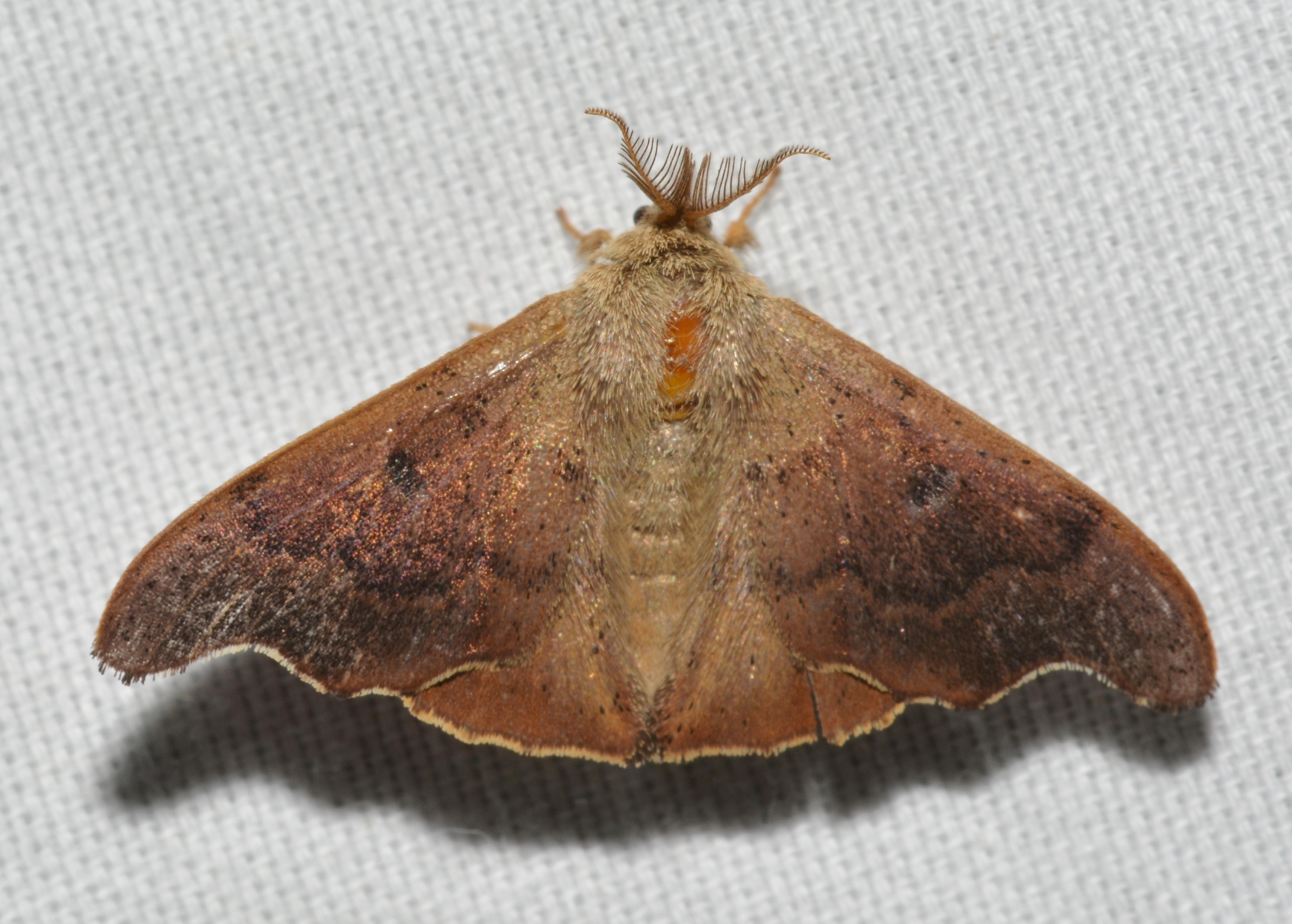
Scalloped sack-bearer, Lacosoma chiridota
