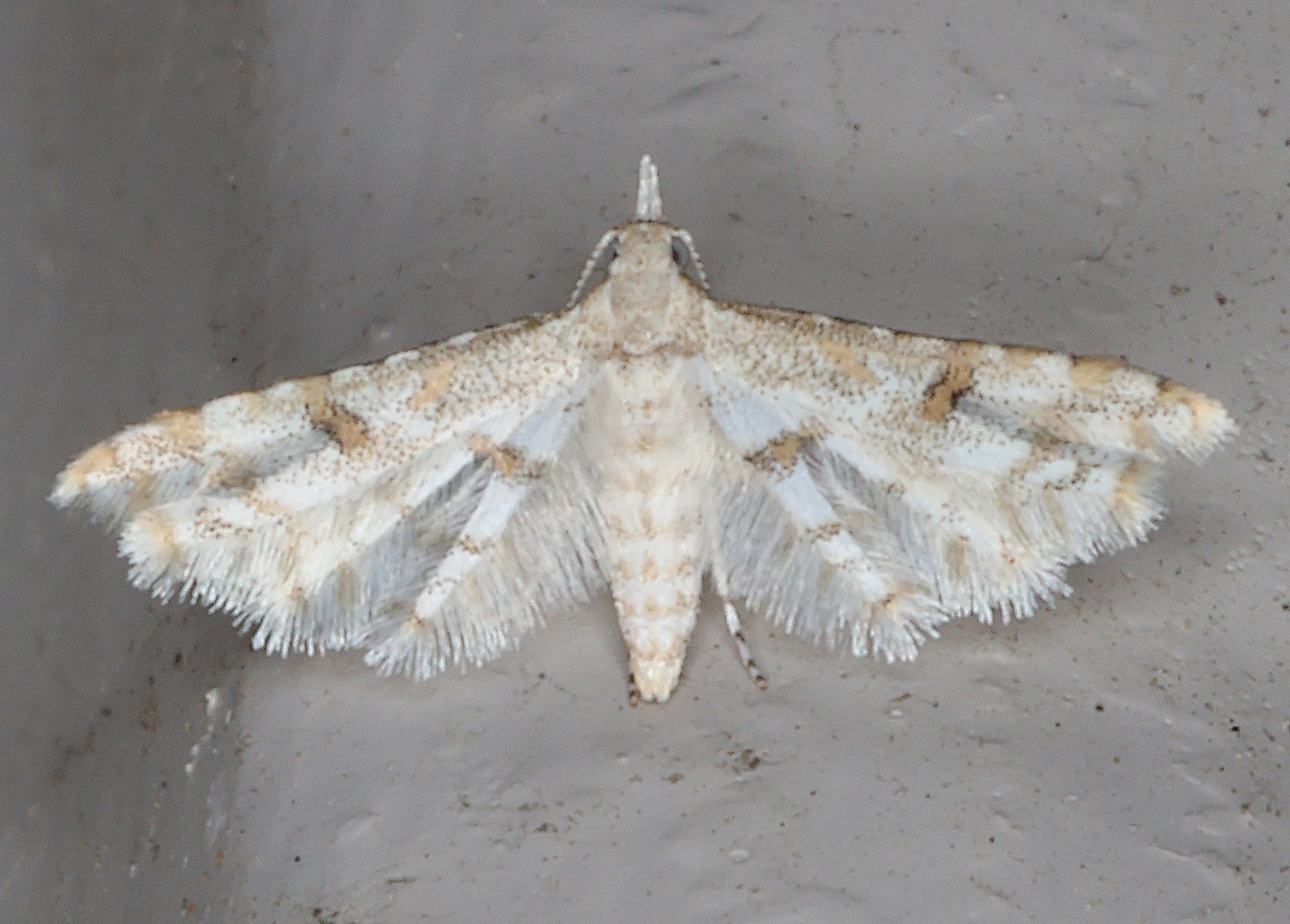
- Cenoloba obliteralis, Moonee Beach, NSW, Australia, 9 October 2025

Scientific classification
- Kingdom: Animalia
- Phylum: Arthropoda
- Clade: Pancrustacea
- Class: Insecta
- Order: Lepidoptera
- Family: Tineodidae
- Genus: Cenoloba; Walsingham, 1885

= Cenoloba =

Genus of moths

Cenoloba is a small moth genus of the family Tineodidae or false plume moths. Lord Walsingham named it in 1885 as a plume moth (Pterophoridae) genus to hold Cenoloba obliteralis, a species originally described by Francis Walker in the genus Pterophorus.

There are currently four named species:

- Cenoloba argochalca Meyrick, 1939
- Cenoloba cuprescens Hampson, 1917
- Cenoloba obliteralis (Walker, 1864)
- Cenoloba taprobana Hampson, 1912
