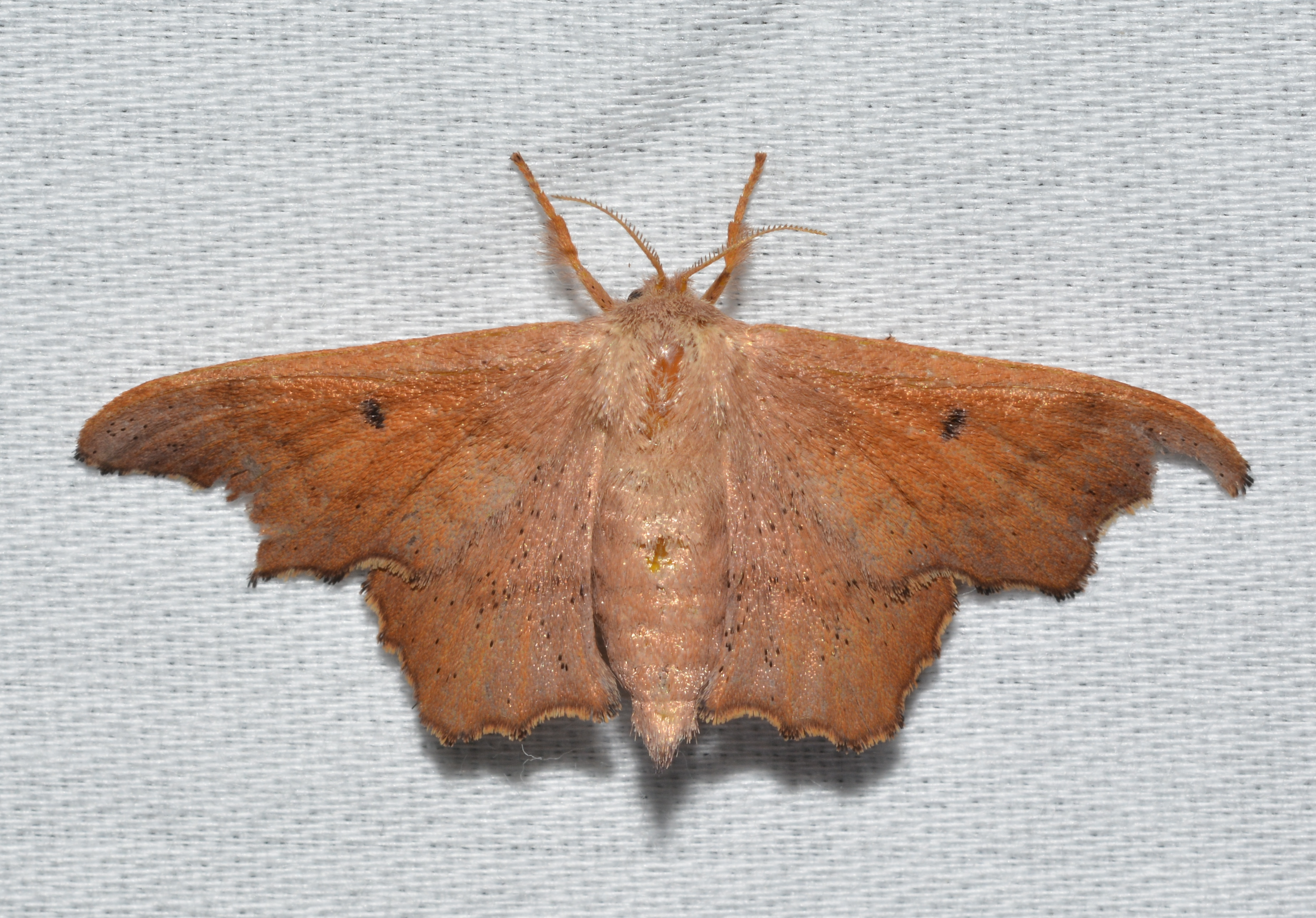
- Lacosoma chiridota

Scientific classification
- Kingdom: Animalia
- Phylum: Arthropoda
- Clade: Pancrustacea
- Class: Insecta
- Order: Lepidoptera
- Family: Mimallonidae
- Genus: Lacosoma; Grote, 1864

= Lacosoma =

Moth genus in family Mimallonidae

Lacosoma is a genus of sack-bearer moths in the family Mimallonidae. There are at least 30 described species in Lacosoma.

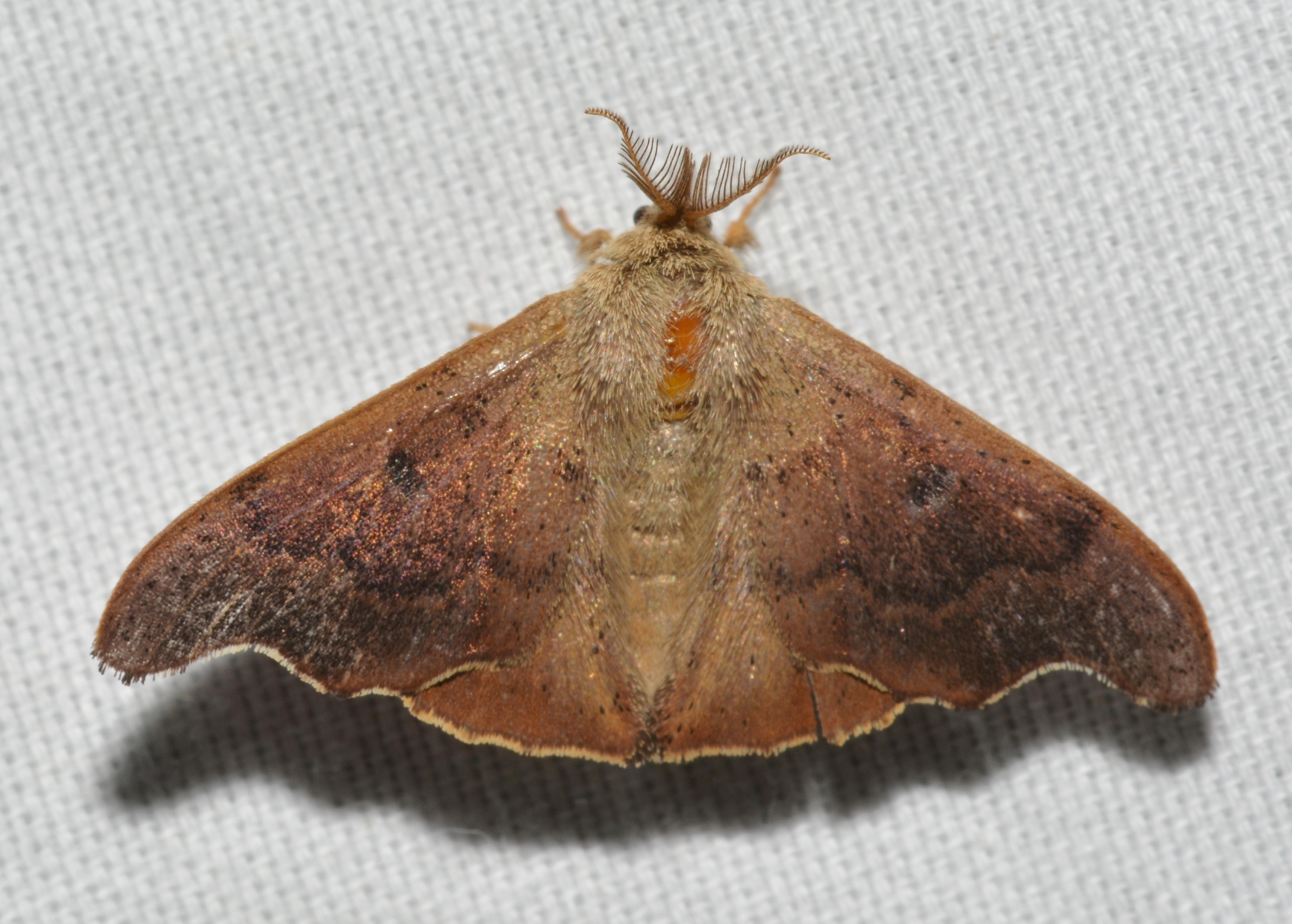
Lacosoma chiridota

The genus name Lacosoma is derived from Greek, referring to the hairy or woolly body characteristic of the group. The common name sack-bearer refers to the larval habit of constructing and carrying a silken case.

== Species ==
These 30 species belong to the genus Lacosoma:

- Lacosoma arizonicum Dyar, 1898^{c g b} (southwestern sack-bearer moth)
- Lacosoma asea Schaus, 1928^{c g}
- Lacosoma aurora Dognin, 1916^{c g}
- Lacosoma bigodia Schaus, 1928^{c g}
- Lacosoma briasia Schaus, 1928^{c g}
- Lacosoma cantia Schaus, 1928^{c g}
- Lacosoma chiridota Grote, 1864^{c g b} (scalloped sack-bearer)
- Lacosoma diederica Schaus, 1928^{c g}
- Lacosoma julietta Dyar, 1913^{c g}
- Lacosoma ladema Dognin, 1920^{c g}
- Lacosoma lola Schaus, 1905^{c g}
- Lacosoma ludolpha Schaus, 1928^{c g}
- Lacosoma lygia Schaus, 1912^{c g}
- Lacosoma maldera Schaus, 1934^{c g}
- Lacosoma medalla Dyar, 1913^{c g}
- Lacosoma ostrinum Herbin, 2016^{g}
- Lacosoma otalla Schaus, 1905^{c g}
- Lacosoma oyapoca Schaus, 1928^{c g}
- Lacosoma perplexa Schaus, 1922^{c g}
- Lacosoma philastria Schaus, 1928^{c g}
- Lacosoma raydela Schaus, 1928^{c g}
- Lacosoma rosea Dognin, 1905^{c g}
- Lacosoma schausi Dognin, 1923^{c g}
- Lacosoma syrinx Druce, 1898^{c g}
- Lacosoma turnina Schaus, 1928^{c g}
- Lacosoma valera Schaus, 1928^{c g}
- Lacosoma valva Schaus, 1905^{c g}
- Lacosoma violacea Sepp, 1818^{c g}
- Lacosoma vulfreda Schaus, 1928^{c g}
- Lacosoma zonoma Schaus, 1928^{c g}

Data sources: i = ITIS, c = Catalogue of Life, g = GBIF, b = Bugguide.net
