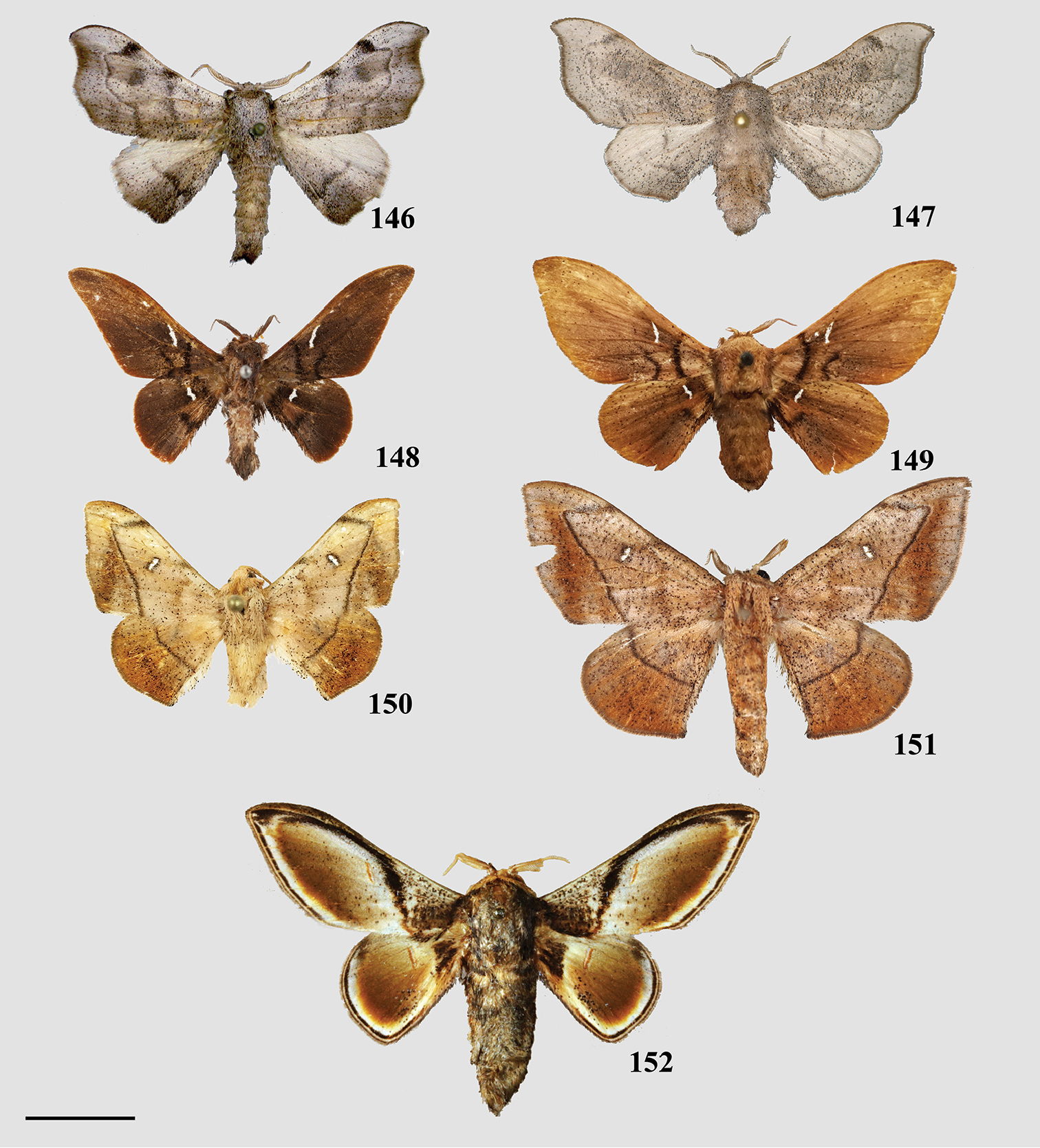

Scientific classification
- Kingdom: Animalia
- Phylum: Arthropoda
- Class: Insecta
- Order: Lepidoptera
- Family: Mimallonidae
- Subfamily: Cicinninae
- Genus: Euphaneta; Schaus, 1928

= Euphaneta =

Genus of moths

Euphaneta is a genus of mimallonid moths described by William Schaus in 1928.

== List of species ==
- Euphaneta divisa (Walker, 1855)
- Euphaneta romani Bryk, 1953
