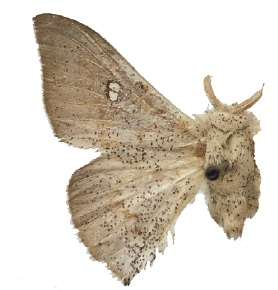
- Male
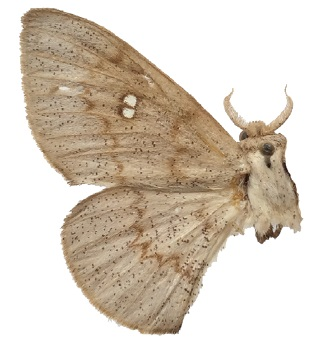
- Female

Scientific classification
- Kingdom: Animalia
- Phylum: Arthropoda
- Class: Insecta
- Order: Lepidoptera
- Family: Mimallonidae
- Genus: Eadmuna
- Species: E. paloa

Binomial name
- Eadmuna paloa Schaus, 1933

= Eadmuna paloa =

Moth species in family Mimallonidae

Eadmuna paloa is a species of moth of the family Mimallonidae. It is found in south-eastern and southern Brazil, where it has been recorded from São Paulo, Santa Catarina, Paraná and Minas Gerais.

The length of the forewings is 16–20 mm (0.63–0.79 in) for males and 22–24 mm (0.87–0.94 in) for females. The forewings are silvery grey brown with contrasting, extensive speckling due to dark, petiolate scales. The postmedial region is roughly concolorous with the rest of the forewings, though the silvery sheen is lost near the margin, so the margin is a singed-brown colour. There is a hyaline discal spot which is prominent, large, very clear, not covered in scales and outlined by dark scales. There is also a very faint postmedial line bulging in the costal half, dentate, narrowly interrupted by the veins and weaker on the costal third except for a darker wedge on the costa. The antemedial line is faint. The hindwings have a similar coloration as the forewings. The postmedial line, when present, may be more strongly marked than on the forewing and there are no hyaline patches.
