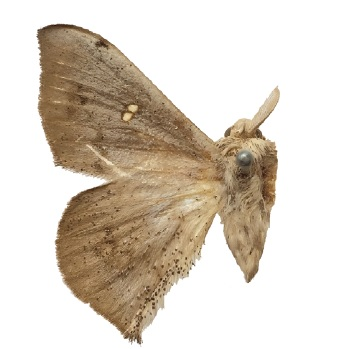
- Eadmuna esperans

Scientific classification
- Kingdom: Animalia
- Phylum: Arthropoda
- Class: Insecta
- Order: Lepidoptera
- Family: Mimallonidae
- Genus: Eadmuna; Schaus, 1928

Species
- See text

= Eadmuna =

Moth genus in family Mimallonidae

Eadmuna is a genus of moths belonging to the family Mimallonidae.

== Species ==
The genus includes the following species:

- Eadmuna esperans (Schaus, 1905)
- Eadmuna guianensis St Laurent & Dombroskie, 2015
- Eadmuna paloa Schaus, 1933
- Eadmuna pulverula (Schaus, 1896)
