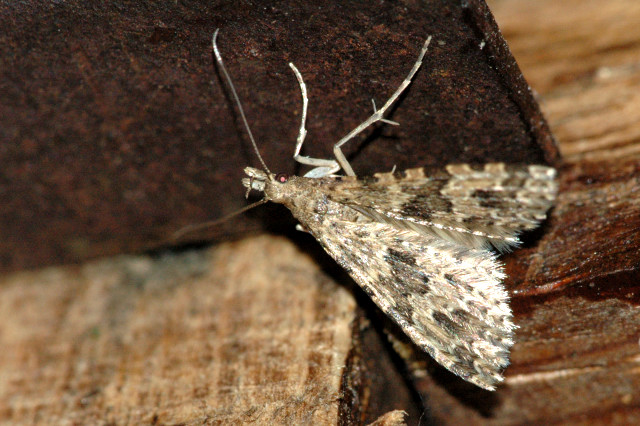
- Twenty-plume moth (Alucita hexadactyla: Alucitidae); Commanster, Belgian High Ardennes

Scientific classification
- Kingdom: Animalia
- Phylum: Arthropoda
- Clade: Pancrustacea
- Class: Insecta
- Order: Lepidoptera
- Clade: Apoditrysia
- Superfamily: Alucitoidea

Diversity
- 1-2 families, c.160 species

= Alucitoidea =

Superfamily of moths

Aluctoidea is the superfamily of many-plumed and false plume moths. These small moths are most easily recognized by their wings. These each consist of many (typically more than 3) narrow strips of membrane around the major veins, instead of a continuous sheet of membrane between the veins. In living moths in the wild, this is often hard to see however. When they are at rest, the "plumes" partly overlap, appearing as solid wings. But even then, they can be recognized by the wings having a marked lengthwise pattern and uneven edge.

They contain two families at most:

- Alucitidae – many-plumed moths
- Tineodidae – false plume moths

Sometimes, only one family is accepted, Tineodidae being merged into Alucitidae with the Alucitoidea thus becoming monotypic. Most of the roughly 160 described species in the superfamily belong to the many-plumed moths; these include a few rather widespread genera. The false plume moths consist of numerous small and well-distinct lineages; none of their genera have managed to become as successful as the Alucitidae.

== Systematics and taxonomy ==
Even though they are "micromoths", the Aluctoidea are not especially primitive Lepidoptera; the sizable carpenter moths (Cossidae) as well as the butterflies are not particularly distant relatives. The closest living relatives of the Aluctoidea, however, seem to be the plume moths (Pterophoroidea), which like the many-plumed moths have wings consisting each of several narrow straps (though less strikingly so than in the Aluctoidea). However, the taxonomic treatment of the many-plumed moths among the Ditrysia is disputed, mostly because of their unclear relationship to the fruitworm moths (Copromorphoidea).

In the arrangement used here, the Copromorphoidea are considered obtectomeran Ditrysia, significantly more advanced than the Aluctoidea (which certainly belong to the basal lineages of Apoditrysia). Some authors disagree and instead assume the Copromorphoidea to be closer relatives of the Alucitidae than even the Tineodidae and Pterophoroidea. This splits the many-plumed moths into two lineages, the Alucitidae (as well as the fringe-tufted moths, Epermeniidae) being included in an expanded Copromorphoidea, and the Tineodidae affiliated with the plume moth instead. The subfamily Alucitoidea is thus abandoned in this approach. The rationale for doing so is the marked similarity of Alucitidae caterpillars and chrysalises to those of Copromorphoidea. But this may simply be convergent evolution or symplesiomorphies, considering that the Copromorphoidea otherwise appear to possess the characteristic synapomorphies of the Obtectomera, which are absent in Aluctoidea.
