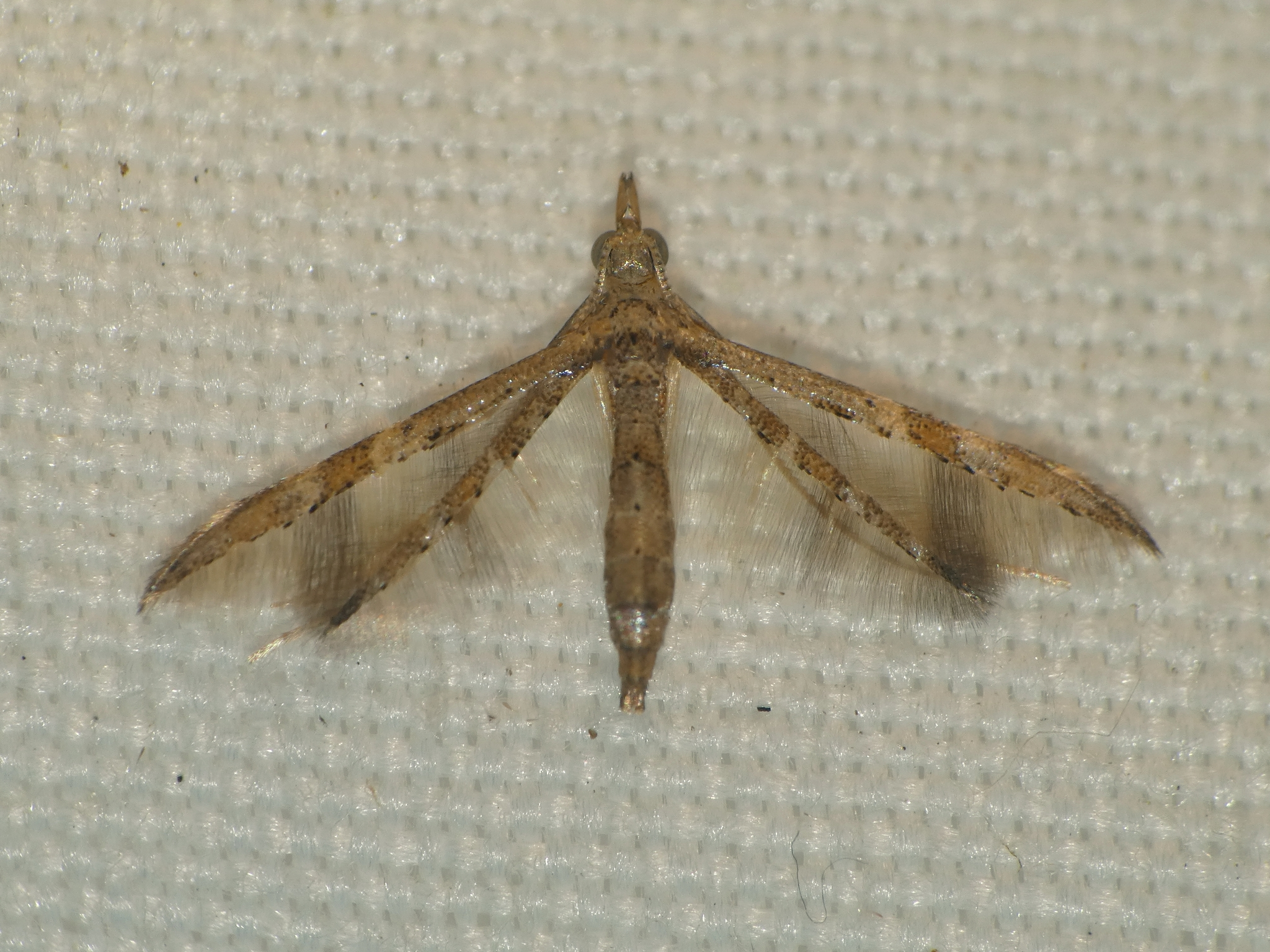
- Oxychirota paradoxa, Thornton Beach, QLD, Australia, 26 March 2025

Scientific classification
- Kingdom: Animalia
- Phylum: Arthropoda
- Clade: Pancrustacea
- Class: Insecta
- Order: Lepidoptera
- Family: Tineodidae
- Genus: Oxychirota; Meyrick, 1885

= Oxychirota =

Genus of moths

Oxychirota is a small moth genus of the family Tineodidae or false plume moths. Edward Meyrick named it in 1885 for the Australian species Oxychirota paradoxa.

There are currently three named species:

- Oxychirota ceylonica Hampson, 1906
- Oxychirota mesocola Hampson, 1906
- Oxychirota paradoxa Meyrick, 1885
