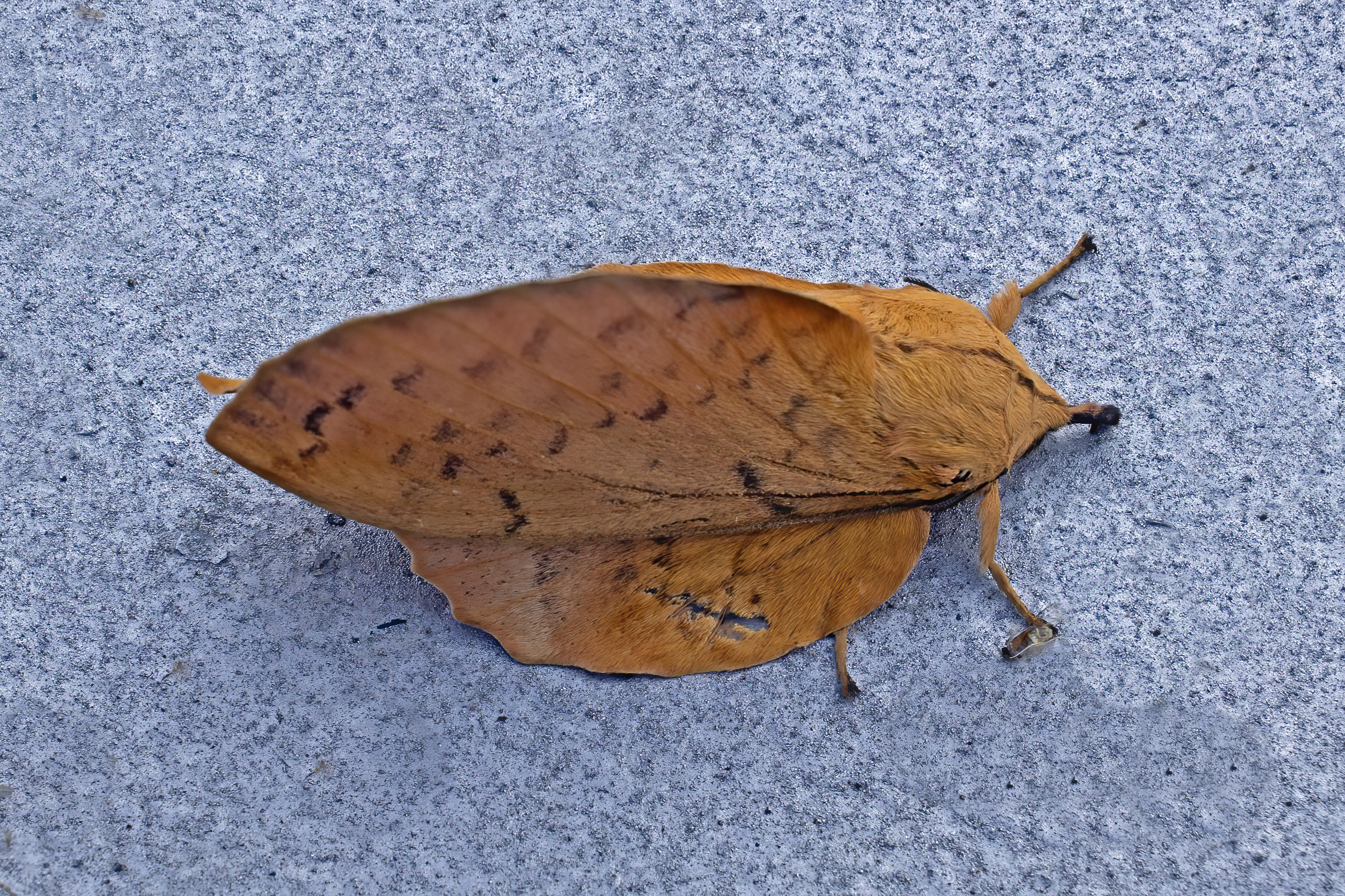
- The poplar lappet Gastropacha populifolia

Scientific classification
- Kingdom: Animalia
- Phylum: Arthropoda
- Clade: Pancrustacea
- Class: Insecta
- Order: Lepidoptera
- Infraorder: Heteroneura
- Clade: Eulepidoptera
- Clade: Ditrysia
- Clade: Apoditrysia
- Clade: Obtectomera
- Clade: Macroheterocera; Chapman, 1893

= Macroheterocera =

Clade of moths

The Macroheterocera are a well supported clade of moths that are closely related to butterflies and macro-moths.

== Taxonomy ==
The Macroheterocera includes the following superfamilies:

- Mimallonoidea – sack bearers (variously included in basal position or excluded)
- Drepanoidea – drepanids
- Noctuoidea – owlet moths
- Geometroidea – inchworms
- Lasiocampoidea – lappet moths
- Bombycoidea – bombycoid moths

The macroheteroceran superfamilies were previously place in the Macrolepidoptera, but recent molecular studies have failed to recover the Macrolepidoptera as a monophyletic group. The latter grouping also included butterflies (Papilionoidea) and Old World butterfly-moths (Calliduloidea).
