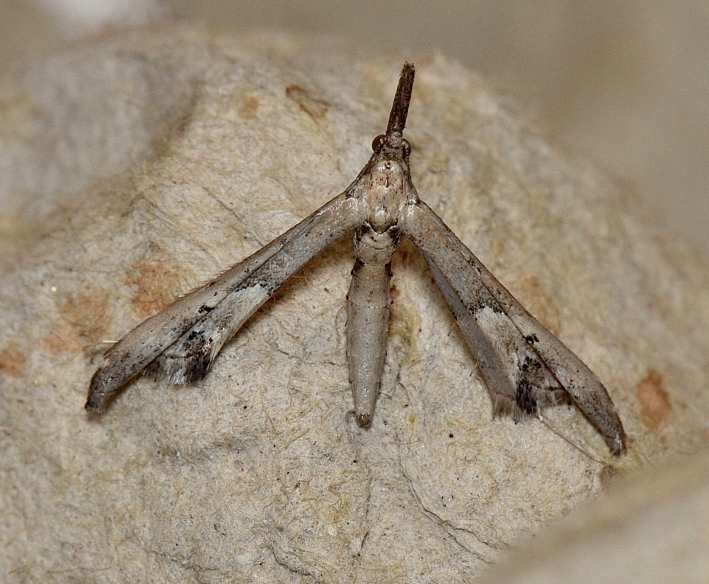
- Tineodes adactylalis, Sandford, TAS, Australia, 5 February 2017

Scientific classification
- Kingdom: Animalia
- Phylum: Arthropoda
- Clade: Pancrustacea
- Class: Insecta
- Order: Lepidoptera
- Family: Tineodidae
- Genus: Tineodes; Guenée, 1854
- Species: T. adactylalis

Binomial name
- Tineodes adactylalis Guenée, 1854

= Tineodes =

Genus of moths

Tineodes is a monotypic moth genus of the family Tineodidae or false plume moths. It was described by Achille Guenée in 1854.
