= Epicimelia =

Scientific classification
- Kingdom: Animalia
- Phylum: Arthropoda
- Class: Insecta
- Order: Lepidoptera
- Family: Cimeliidae
- Genus: Epicimelia; Korb, 1900
- Species: E. theresiae

Binomial name
- Epicimelia theresiae Korb, 1900

Synonyms
- Axia theresiae; Axia theresiae defreinai Witt, 1982; Epicimelia theresiae malatyiensis Amsel, 1979

Genus of moths

Epicimelia is a monotypic moth genus in the family Cimeliidae first described by Maximilian Korb in 1900. Its only species, Epicimelia theresiae, described by the same author in the same year, is found in Turkey and Iran.

== Subspecies ==
- Epicimelia theresiae theresiae
- Epicimelia theresiae schellhornae Amsel, 1979
