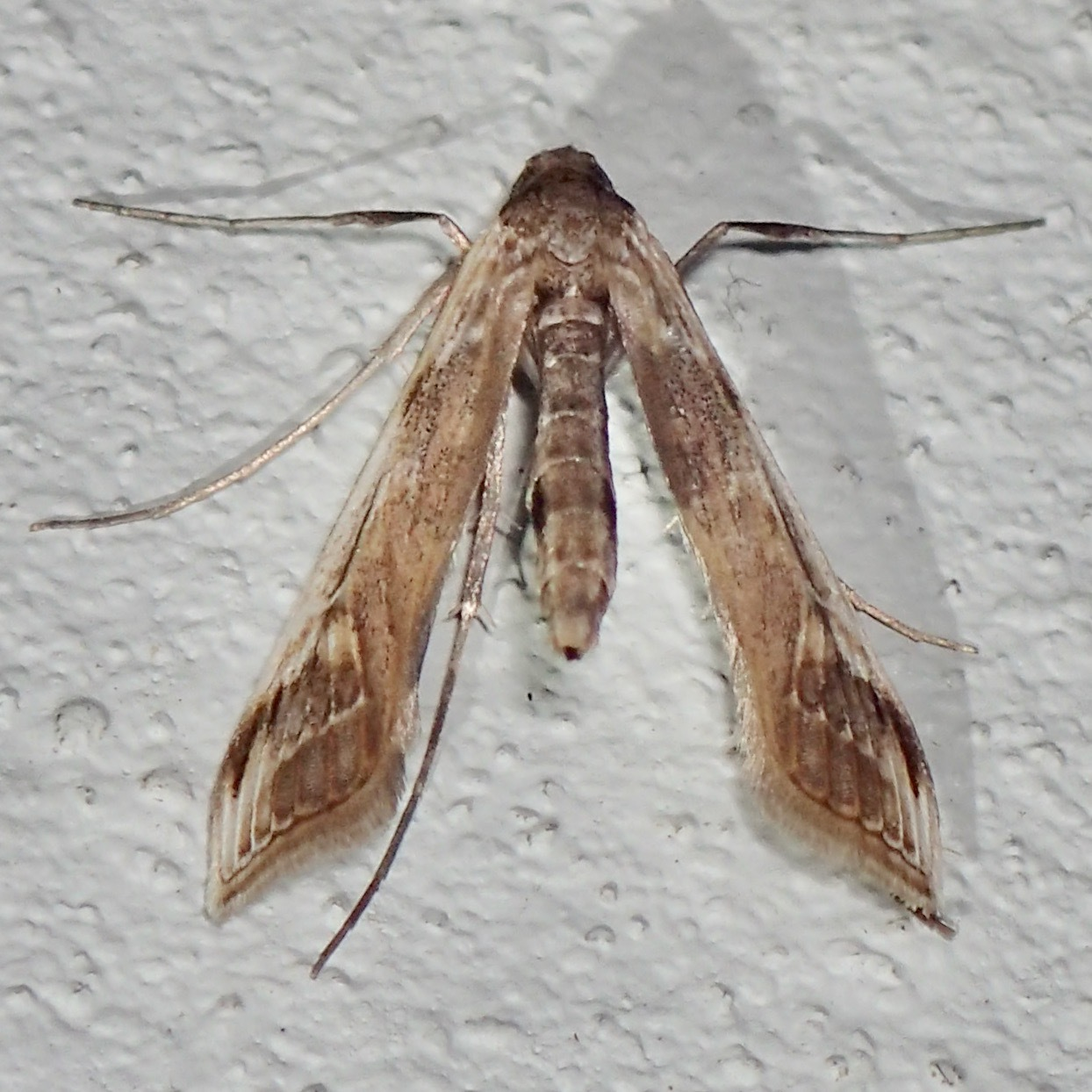
- Tanycnema anomala, Lamington National Park, QLD, Australia, 30 October 2022

Scientific classification
- Kingdom: Animalia
- Phylum: Arthropoda
- Class: Insecta
- Order: Lepidoptera
- Family: Tineodidae
- Genus: Tanycnema; Turner, 1922
- Species: T. anomala

Binomial name
- Tanycnema anomala Turner, 1922

= Tanycnema =

Genus of moths

Tanycnema is a monotypic moth genus of the family Tineodidae or false plume moths. It was described by Alfred Jefferis Turner in 1922. Turner described the genus in Proceedings of the Royal Society of Victoria, writing:

Gen. Tanycnema, nov.

Frons with a strong anterior tuft of hairs. Tongue present. Palpi rather long, porrect. Maxillary palpi obsolete. Antennae short. Legs long, slender; outer tibial spurs about 3/4 length of inner spurs. Forewings narrow, elongate; 2 from well before angle, 3 from angle, 4 and 5 somewhat approximate at origin, 6 from upper angle, 7, 8, 9, 10 stalked, 7 arising slightly before 10, 11 free. Hindwings twice as broad as forewings; 2 from 3/4, 3 from angle, 4 and 5 somewhat approximate at origin, 6 well separated at origin from 5, still more widely from 7, 7 from upper angle, closely approximated to 12 for some distance, but not anastomosing.

A peculiar, isolated, and primitive genus. The wide separation of 6 from 7 of the hindwings, and the absence of any anastomosis of 7 with 12 are primitive characters; on the other hand the relative approximation of 5 to 4 in the hindwings, and the stalking of 7 and 10 of the forewings are specialised characters, the former being unique in this family, to which the genus must, I think, be referred, though the absence of maxillary palpi (if confirmed), suggests some relationship to the Pterophoridae, but this may be more apparent than real.

The genus's one species, Tanycnema anomala, was described in the same article, as:

Tanycnema anomala, n. sp.

♂ 34 mm. Head and thorax brownish-grey. Palpi 3 1/2; brownish. Antennae about 1/2; fuscous. Abdomen grey; dorsum of basal segment whitish-grey. Legs brownish-grey. Forewings narrow, elongate, gradually dilating posteriorly, but only to a moderate extent, costa straight to middle, thence sinuate, apex pointed, termen slightly sinuate, slightly oblique; brownish-grey; costa broadly suffused with ochreous-whitish throughout; an ochreous-whitish dot at 2/3 on end of cell; a suffused inwardly-oblique, fuscous streak from before apex, cutting across pale costal area, then slightly dentate to about half-way across disc; a whitish subterminal line from apical pale area to vein 3; a similar line precedes terminal edge, which is fuscous, and is itself preceded by an obscure series of fuscous dots; cilia whitish-brown. Hindwings with apex tolerably pointed, termen gently rounded, wavy; grey; cilia grey.

Q., National Park (3000 ft.), in December; one specimen.
