= Anomima =

Scientific classification
- Kingdom: Animalia
- Phylum: Arthropoda
- Class: Insecta
- Order: Lepidoptera
- Family: Tineodidae
- Genus: Anomima; Turner, 1922
- Species: A. phaeochroa

Binomial name
- Anomima phaeochroa Turner, 1922

Genus of moths

Anomima phaeochra is a nocturnal species of moth belonging to the genus Anomima and family Tineodidae. Anomima phaeochra can be found throughout Australia. Anomima phaeochra was first described by naturalist Alfred Jefferis Turner in 1922 in Queensland, Australia.
