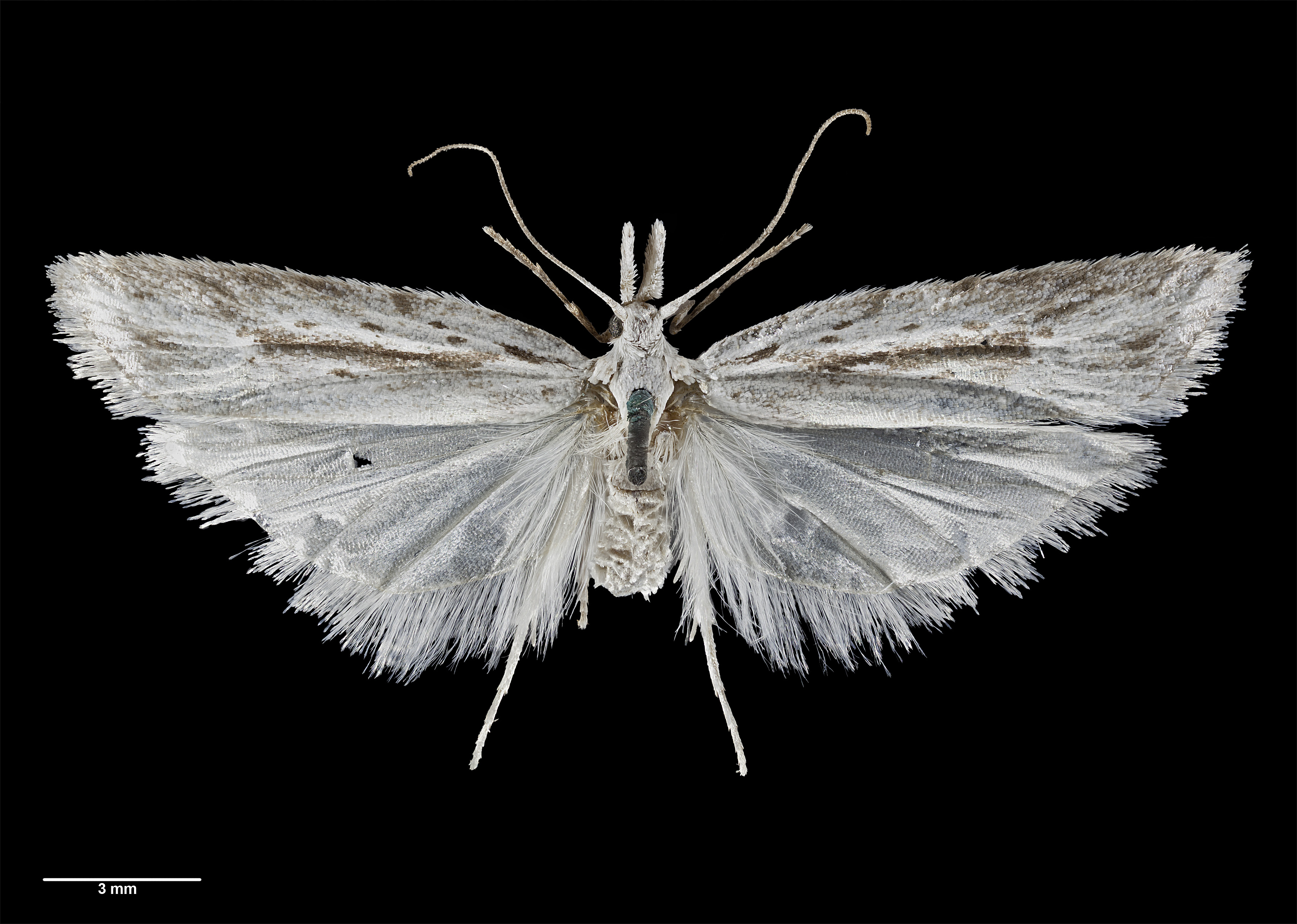
- Carposinidae specimen

Scientific classification
- Kingdom: Animalia
- Phylum: Arthropoda
- Clade: Pancrustacea
- Class: Insecta
- Order: Lepidoptera
- Clade: Neolepidoptera
- Infraorder: Heteroneura
- Clade: Eulepidoptera
- Clade: Ditrysia
- Clade: Apoditrysia
- Superfamily: Carposinoidea; Walsingham, 1897

Families
- Copromorphidae; Carposinidae

Diversity
- About 318 species

Synonyms
- Copromorphoidea Meyrick, 1905

= Carposinoidea =

Superfamily of moths

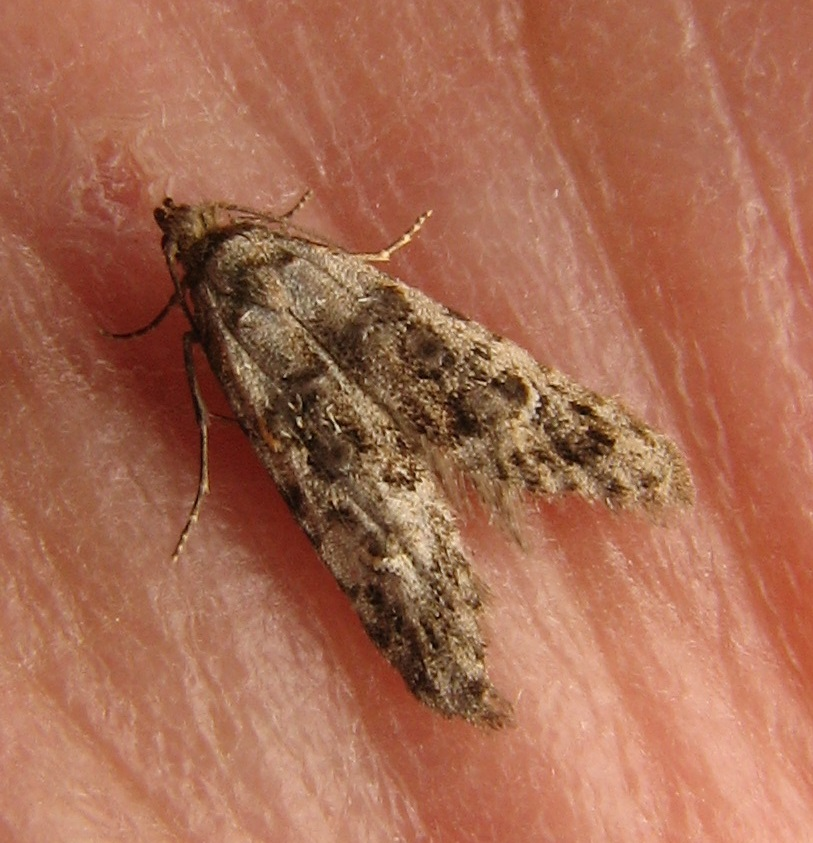
Bondia sp.

Carposinoidea, the "fruitworm moths", is a superfamily of insects in the lepidopteran order. The superfamily is also known as Copromorphoidea, which is a junior synonym. These moths are small to medium-sized (10–50 mm. in wingspan) and are broad-winged bearing some resemblance to the superfamilies Tortricoidea and Immoidea. The antennae are often "pectinate" especially in males, and many species of these well camouflaged moths bear raised tufts of scales on the wings and a specialised fringe of scales at the base of the hindwing sometimes in females only; there are a number of other structural characteristics (Common, 1990; Dugdale et al., 1999) . The position of this superfamily is not certain, but it has been placed in the natural group of "Apoditrysia" "Obtectomera" (Minet, 1991), rather than with the superfamilies Alucitoidea or Epermenioidea within which it has sometimes previously been placed, on the grounds that shared larval and pupal characteristics of these groups have probably evolved independently. It has been suggested that the division into two families should be abandoned (e.g. Holloway et al., 2001).

== Distribution ==
Carposinoidea occur worldwide except the northwest Palaearctic region (Dugdale et al., 1999).

== Behaviour ==
Adults are night-flying and attracted to lights. Caterpillars live between joined leaves or fruits or bore within stems. The larvae pupate with the silken gallery or descend to the ground and make a cocoon covered in detritus (Dugdale et al., 1999).

== Larval hostplants ==
The hostplants include the gymnosperm genus Podocarpus and quite a wide range of dicotyledon families. As the moths can infest fruit some are considered pest species such as the "Peach Fruit Moth".
