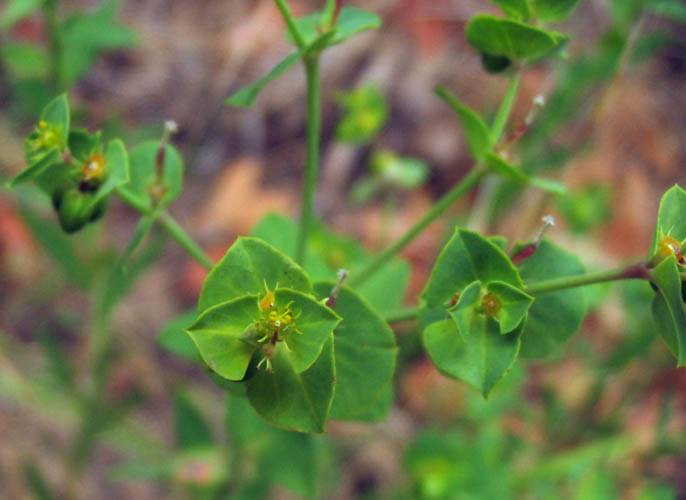

Scientific classification
- Kingdom: Plantae
- Clade: Tracheophytes
- Clade: Angiosperms
- Clade: Eudicots
- Clade: Rosids
- Order: Malpighiales
- Family: Euphorbiaceae
- Genus: Euphorbia
- Species: E. terracina

Binomial name
- Euphorbia terracina L.

= Euphorbia terracina =

Species of plant

Euphorbia terracina, commonly known as the Geraldton carnation weed and False caper, is a species of perennial herb in the family Euphorbiaceae. It has a self-supporting growth form and simple, broad leaves. Flowers are visited by Lipotriches brachysoma, Lipotriches natalensis, Lipotriches crassula, and Nomia bouyssoui. It produces small, three lobed fruits, with each lobe containing one seed.

== Distribution ==
Euphorbia terracina is natively distributed in Mediterranean climate regions of Northern Africa, temperate Asia, and some areas of Europe. It is an invasive weed in other similar climate regions mainly in Australia and the U.S. state of California. It allelopathically inhibits growth of surrounding plants.

== Toxicity ==
Euphorbia terracina is toxic to both humans and livestock. As with many other Euphorbia species, exposure to its milky sap may cause irritation to skin, eyes, and digestive tracts.

== Uses ==
In some regions of Algeria, the sap of Euphorbia terracina is used to treat warts. The sap has been found to demonstrate antioxidative properties

== Sources ==
This article incorporates text from a free content work. Licensed under CC0 (license statement/permission). Text taken from Euphorbia terracina. Encyclopedia of Life.
