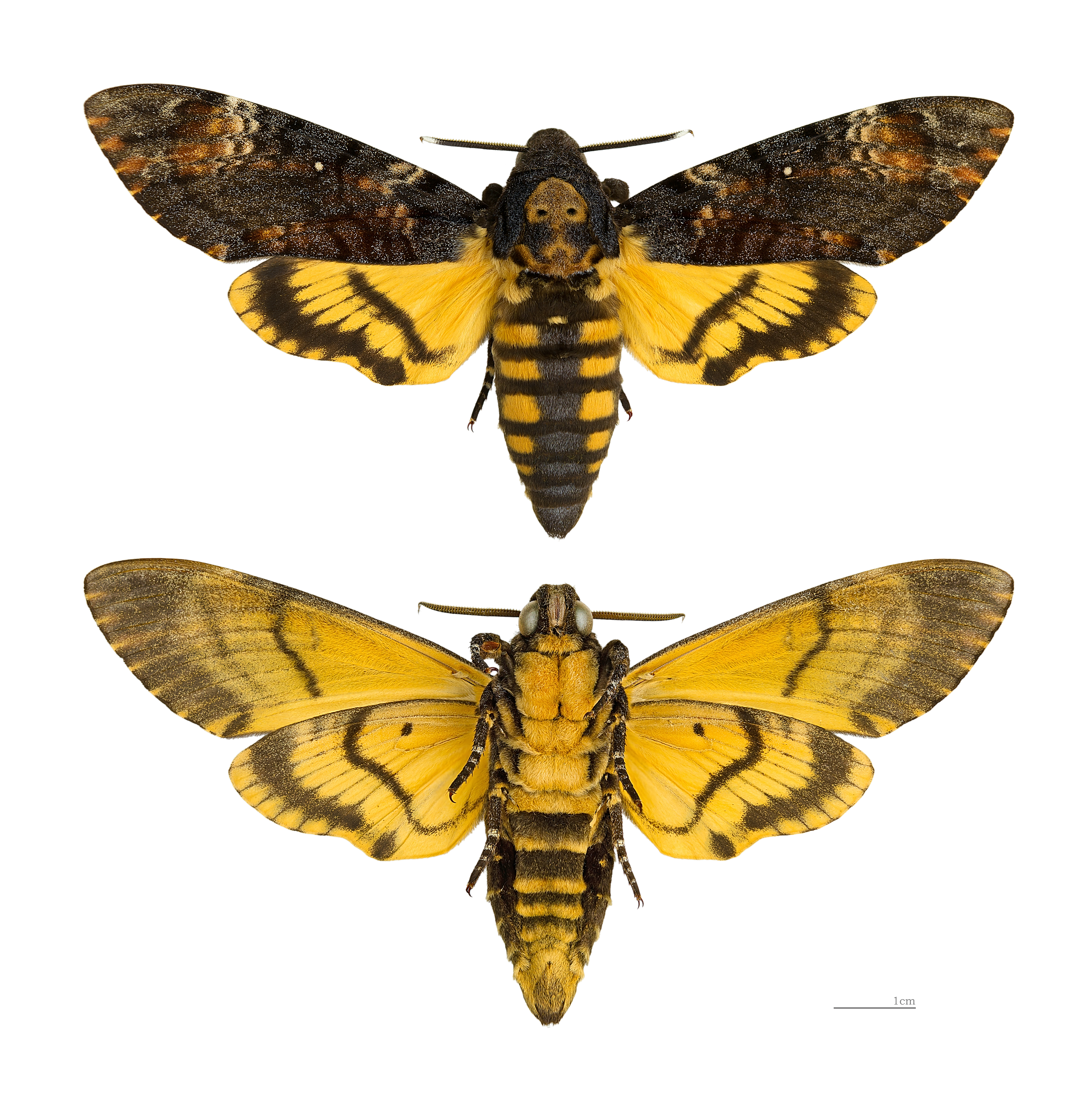
- Death's-head hawkmoth (Acherontia atropos)

Scientific classification
- Kingdom: Animalia
- Phylum: Arthropoda
- Clade: Pancrustacea
- Class: Insecta
- Order: Lepidoptera
- Clade: Eulepidoptera
- Clade: Ditrysia
- Clade: Apoditrysia
- Clade: Obtectomera
- Clade: Macroheterocera
- Superfamily: Bombycoidea; Gravenhorst, 1843

Families
- See text

Diversity
- >3,500 species

Synonyms
- Bombyciformia Schrank, 1802; Sphingoidea Gravenhorst, 1843

= Bombycoidea =

Superfamily of moths

Bombycoidea is a superfamily of moths, including the silk moths, sphinx moths, saturniids (including giant silk moths), and relatives. The superfamily Lasiocampoidea is a close relative and was historically sometimes merged in this group. After many years of debate and shifting taxonomies, the most recent classifications treat the superfamily as containing 10 constituent families.

== Characteristics ==
Bombycoid larvae often exhibit horns. In the adult stage they are typically large, and include the largest moths in the world.

== Families ==
Bombycoidea includes the following families:

- Anthelidae
- Apatelodidae
- Bombycidae
- Brahmaeidae (syn. Lemoniidae)
- Carthaeidae
- Endromidae (syn. Mirinidae)
- Eupterotidae
- Phiditiidae
- Saturniidae
- Sphingidae
