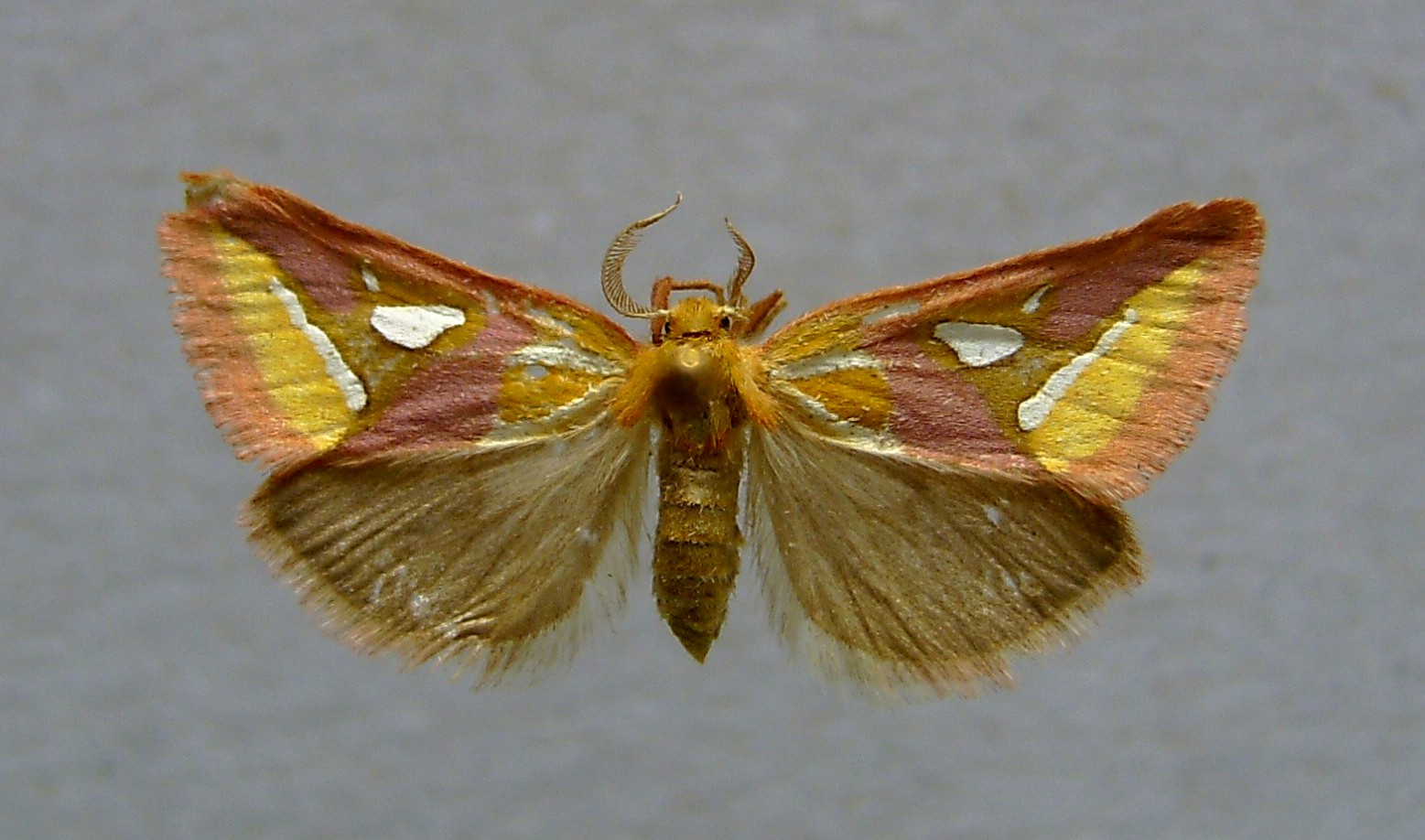
- Axia margarita

Scientific classification
- Domain: Eukaryota
- Kingdom: Animalia
- Phylum: Arthropoda
- Class: Insecta
- Order: Lepidoptera
- Clade: Ditrysia
- Clade: Apoditrysia
- Clade: Obtectomera
- Clade: Macroheterocera
- Superfamily: Drepanoidea
- Family: Cimeliidae; Chrétien, 1916

Genera
- Axia; Epicimelia

Synonyms
- Axiidae Rebel, 1919

= Cimeliidae =

Family of moths

Cimeliidae, the gold moths (formerly known as Axiidae), is a family of moths that is now placed in the macroheteroceran superfamily Drepanoidea, although previously placed in its own superfamily. Uniquely, they have a pair of pocket-like organs on the seventh abdominal spiracle of the adult moth which are only possibly sound receptive organs. They are quite large and brightly coloured moths that occur in southern Europe and feed on species of Euphorbia. Sometimes they are attracted to light. The family was first described by Pierre Chrétien in 1916.
