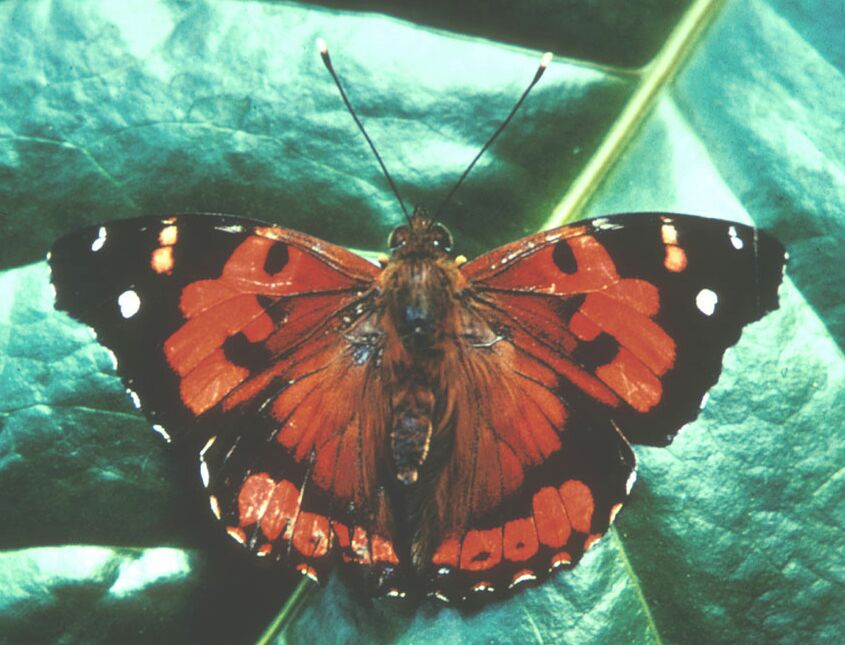
- Kamehameha

Scientific classification
- Kingdom: Animalia
- Phylum: Arthropoda
- Class: Insecta
- Order: Lepidoptera
- Clade: Myoglossata
- Clade: Neolepidoptera
- Infraorder: Heteroneura
- Clade: Eulepidoptera
- Clade: Ditrysia; Borner, 1925

Principal clades and superfamilies
- Tineoidea; Gracillarioidea; Yponomeutoidea; Apoditrysia; Simaethistoidea; Gelechioidea; Galacticoidea; Zygaenoidea; Cossoidea; Sesioidea; Choreutoidea; Carposinoidea; Tortricoidea; Urodoidea; Schreckensteinioidea; Epermenioidea; Alucitoidea; Pterophoroidea; Immoidea; Obtectomera; Whalleyanoidea; Hyblaeoidea; Pyraloidea; Thyridoidea; Calliduloidea; Papilionoidea (butterflies); Macroheterocera; Mimallonoidea; Lasiocampoidea; Bombycoidea; Noctuoidea; Drepanoidea; Geometroidea

= Ditrysia =

Suborder of moths and butterflies

Ditrysia is a clade of lepidopterans that contains both butterflies and a majority of moth species. They are named for the fact that the female has two distinct sexual openings: one for mating, and the other for laying eggs.

== Description ==
As larvae, they initially feed on plants until they grow to become adults and feed on nectar. They function as herbivores, pollinators, and prey in terrestrial ecosystems, and can also be extremely damaging to crops.

== Classification ==
About 98% of known Lepidoptera species belong to Ditrysia. The Lepidoptera group can be divided into the primitive but paraphyletic "micromoths" and the derived monophyletic Apoditrysia, which include mostly larger moths, as well as the butterflies.

Those with a dorsal heart vessel belong in section Cossina. Others, having a ventral heart vessel, belong in section Tineina. While it is difficult to pinpoint the origin of affinities between clades, Tineoidea are found to be useful in understanding the vast diversity in Ditrysia. Obstecomera and Macrolepidoptera are other examples of Ditrysia's subclades.

Apoditrysia, Obtectomera, and Macrolepidoptera will be considered monophyletic if one or more organisms are either included or excluded from the clade.

== See also ==
- Lepidoptera
- Taxonomy of Lepidoptera
