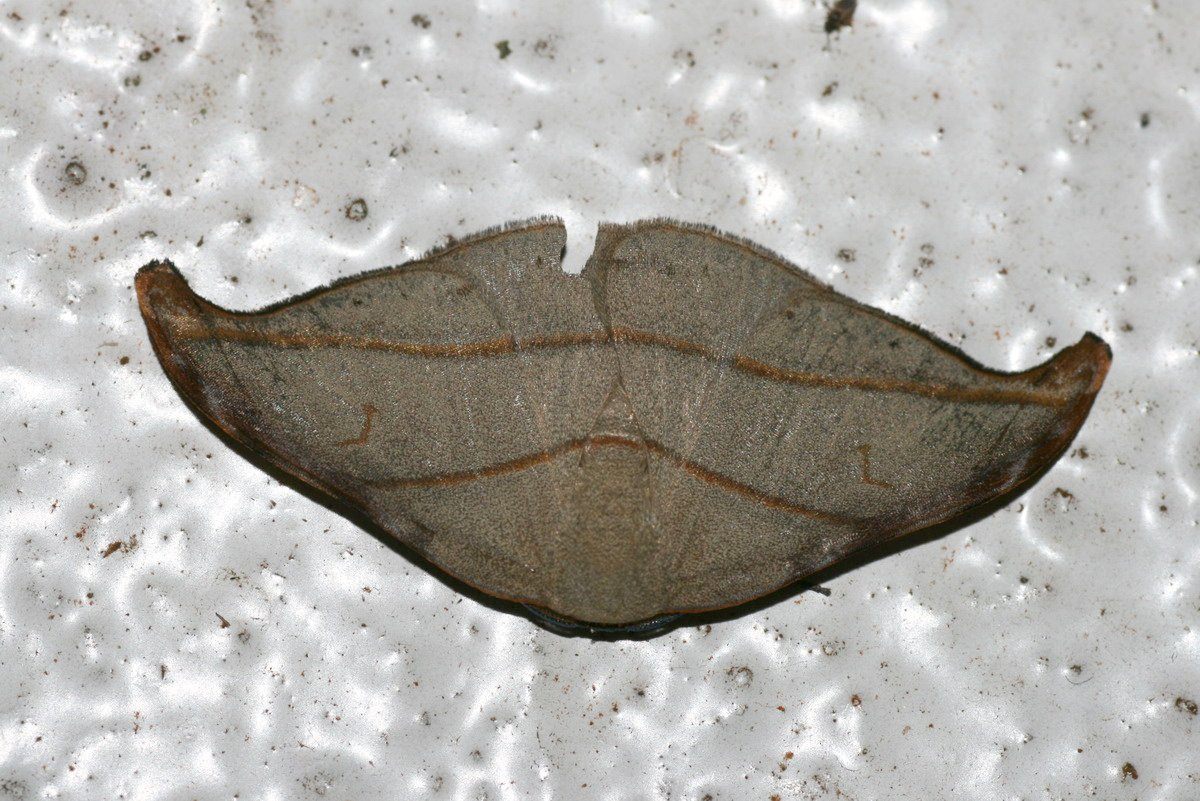

Scientific classification
- Domain: Eukaryota
- Kingdom: Animalia
- Phylum: Arthropoda
- Class: Insecta
- Order: Lepidoptera
- Clade: Eulepidoptera
- Clade: Ditrysia
- Clade: Apoditrysia
- Clade: Obtectomera
- Clade: Macroheterocera
- Superfamily: Drepanoidea; Boisduval, 1828

Families
- Drepanidae; Cimeliidae; Doidae

Synonyms
- Cimelioidea Chrétien, 1916; Axioidea Rebel, 1919 (Unav.)

= Drepanoidea =

Superfamily of moths

Drepanoidea is the superfamily of "hook tip moths". See Minet and Scoble (1999) for a comprehensive overview.

== Sources ==
- Firefly Encyclopedia of Insects and Spiders, edited by Christopher O'Toole, ISBN 1-55297-612-2, 2002
