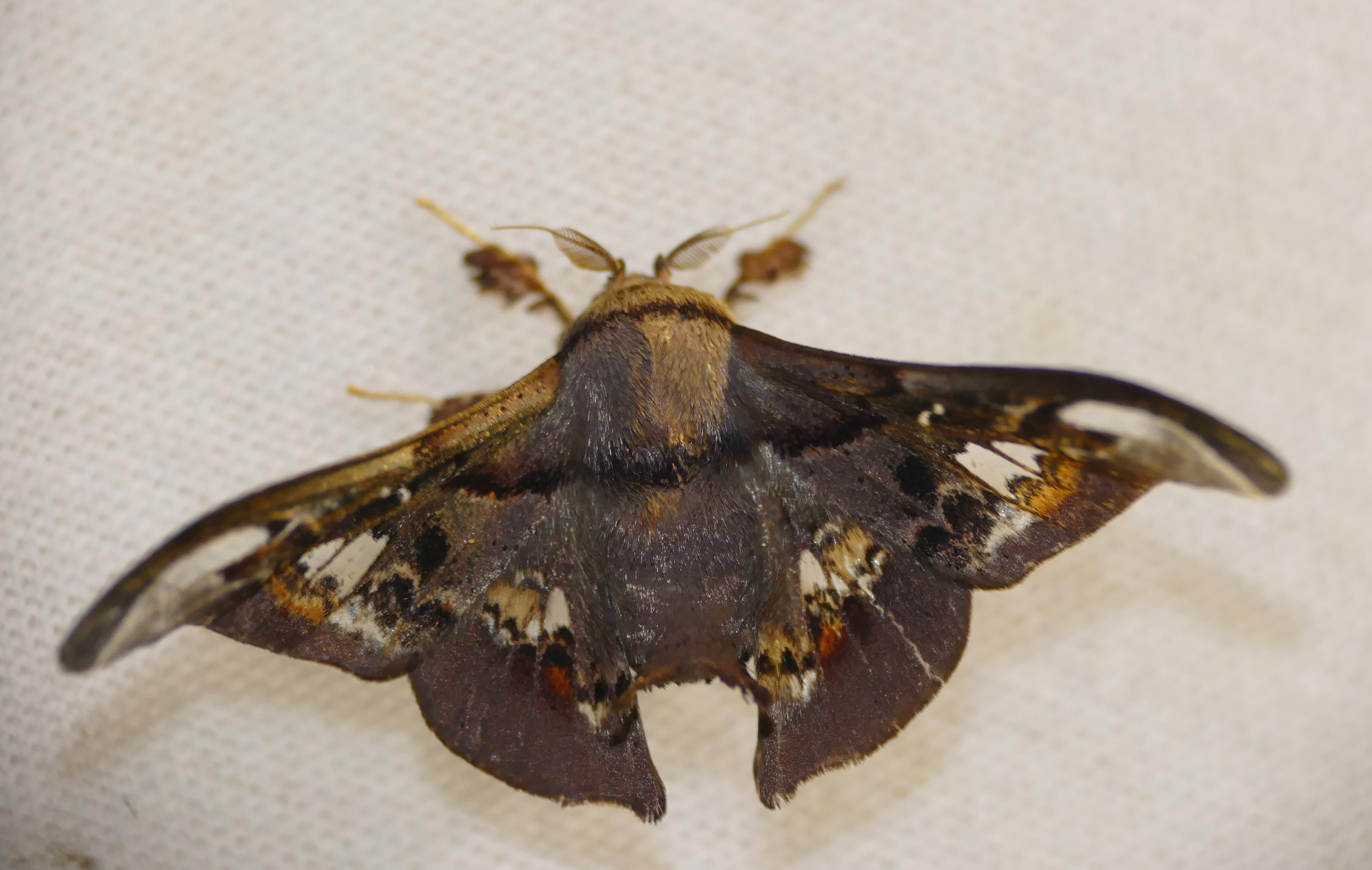
- Adalgisa eliasi

Scientific classification
- Kingdom: Animalia
- Phylum: Arthropoda
- Class: Insecta
- Order: Lepidoptera
- Clade: Ditrysia
- Clade: Apoditrysia
- Clade: Obtectomera
- Clade: Macroheterocera
- Superfamily: Mimallonoidea
- Family: Mimallonidae

Subfamilies
- Aurorianinae St Laurent & Kawahara, 2018; Cicinninae Schaus, 1912; Druenticinae St Laurent & Kawahara, 2018; Lacosominae Dyar, 1893; Meneviinae St Laurent, Herbin, & Kawahara, 2020; Mimalloninae Burmeister, 1878; Roelofinae St Laurent & Kawahara, 2020; Zaphantinae St Laurent & Kawahara, 2018

Diversity
- 300 species

= Mimallonidae =

Family of moths

Mimallonidae (mimallonids), sometimes known as "sack-bearer" moths for the larval case-building behavior, are a family of Lepidoptera containing over 300 named species in 43 genera. These moths are found only in the New World, with most taxa occurring in the Neotropics. Adult moths are externally similar to those belonging to some of the other Macroheterocera families Bombycoidea and Drepanoidea, and thus have been variously treated as belonging to either one of these or other superfamilies.

== Distribution ==
Mimallonids are restricted to the New World, and are distributed in North America, Central America, South America, and the Caribbean (Cuba and The Bahamas). The vast majority of genera and species are found in the tropical regions of the New World, with only five described species from the United States.

== Biology ==
Not much has been published on the natural history of adult Mimallonidae, though most species are thought to be nocturnal. At least three species have diurnal males. Young caterpillars live inside of folded leaves or beneath silken networks, and build portable or semi-portable cases out of silk, frass, and plant material as they grow. The cases are open on either end and vary from irregular in structure to spindle-shaped. The openings of the cases can be blocked by the head and/or the flattened anal plate of the last segment of the body. The sack-like case-making behavior of the caterpillars have earned them the common name "sack-bearers".

Mimallonidae larvae feed on several families of plants, including (but not limited to): Anacardiaceae, Clusiaceae, Combretaceae, Fagaceae, Melastomataceae, Myrtaceae and Rubiaceae. Research at the Area de Conservación, Guanacaste, Costa Rica has resulted in the rearing of many species of Mimallonidae, including some from several additional families of plants.

== Systematics and evolution ==
The current consensus, especially in works based on phylogenetic results, consider Mimallonidae to be the sole family of Mimallonoidea. Other phylogenetic studies of all major Lepidoptera lineages support the placement of Mimallonidae as sister to all Macroheterocera, but within the broader clade Obtectomera. This phylogenetic placement means that mimallonid moths are not more closely related to any one family of Lepidoptera, but are equally related (share a common ancestor with) all members of the extremely diverse clade Macroheterocera. Morphological features, particularly of the larvae, support the uniqueness of this family and distinctness from Macroheterocera.

The systematic relationships with Mimallonidae have been subject to two revisions, resulting in two different classification schemes. William Schaus revised the family and named most of the genera, he then separated the genera into two subfamilies: Lacosominae and Mimalloninae. These subfamilies were based on the presence (Lacosominae) or the absence (Mimalloninae) of the frenulum. It was later realized that this character varies within genera, and thus was deemed a sympleisiomorphy. Using molecular phylogenetics, specifically with the technique of anchored hybrid enrichment, the family was reorganized based on the recognition and naming of robustly supported clades, which were further strengthened with morphological apomorphies. The clades which were robustly supported across all analyses were assigned subfamily status, resulting in recognition of seven subfamilies in Mimallonidae. Using both molecular and morphological phylogenetics, all 42 genera (including some newly described ones) were assigned to the named clades. The 300+ species of the family, too, have been formally classified according to their phylogenetic arrangement.

Recently, many of the species formally placed in the genus Cicinnus have been transferred to Gonogramma, making Gonogramma one of the most diverse mimallonid genera.

=== Subfamilies, tribes, and genera ===
Below are the named clades of Mimallonidae, with their constituent genera assigned to their subfamily and tribe (wherever applicable).

- Zaphantinae
  - Zaphanta Dyar, 1910
- Roelofinae
  - Roelofa Schaus, 1928
- Meneviinae
  - Cunicumara St Laurent, 2016
  - Menevia Schaus, 1928
  - Tolypida Schaus, 1928
- Aurorianinae
  - Auroriana St Laurent and C. Mielke, 2016
- Mimalloninae
  - Eadmuna Schaus, 1928
  - Macessoga Schaus, 1928
  - Mimallo Hübner, 1820
  - Mimallodes St Laurent and Becker, 2020
  - Tostallo St Laurent and C. Mielke, 2016
- Lacosominae
- Alheitini
  - Adalgisa Schaus, 1928
  - Alheita Schaus, 1928
  - Arianula Herbin, 2012,
  - Fatellalla St Laurent and Kawahara, 2019
  - Herbinalla St Laurent and Kawahara, 2018
  - Tarema Schaus, 1896
  - Thaelia Herbin, 2016
- Lacosomini
  - Citralla St Laurent and Kawahara, 2019
  - Lacosoma Grote, 1864
  - Vanenga Schaus, 1928
- Trogopterini
  - Reinmara Schaus, 1928
  - Trogoptera Herrich-Schäffer, [1856]
- Druenticinae
- Druenticini:
  - Druentica Strand, 1932
  - Lepismalla St Laurent and Kawahara, 2019
  - Micrallo St Laurent and C. Mielke, 2016
  - Pamea Walker, 1855
  - Procinnus Herbin, 2016
  - Ulaluma St Laurent and Kawahara, 2018
- Luramini
  - Lurama Schaus, 1928
  - Ulmara Schaus, 1928
- Cicinninae
- Bedosiini
  - Bedosia Schaus, 1928
  - Bedosiallo St Laurent and Kawahara, 2018
- Cicinnini
  - Aceclostria Vuillot, 1893
  - Aleyda Schaus, 1928
  - Arcinnus Herbin, 2016
  - Cicinnus Blanchard, 1852
  - Cerradocinnus St Laurent, MIelke, and Kawahara, 2020
  - Gonogramma Boisduval, 1872
  - Euphaneta Schaus, 1928
  - Isoscella St Laurent and Carvalho, 2017
  - Roelmana Schaus, 1928
- Psychocampini
  - Biterolfa Schaus, 1928
  - Psychocampa Grote and Robinson, 1867

== Importance to humans ==
Mimallonidae have been reported as pests of some economically significant crops. In Surinam, Mimallo amilia has been noted as a pest of guava (Psidium gaujava). In Brazil, M. amilia is a known pest of eucalyptus (Eucalyptus urophylla) and Psychocampa callipius a pest of cashew (Anacardium occidentale).

In addition to some Mimallonidae species being regarded as pests, others have been considered as potential biological controls of invasive plants. Species belonging to the genus Druentica have been considered as potential control agents of Miconia calvescens (where it is invasive throughout the Pacific Islands, including Hawaii and Australia) and Clidemia hirta in Hawaii. Aceclostria mus has been evaluated as a potential control agent of the Brazilian pepper tree (Schinus terebinthifolius) in the United States.

== Sources ==
- Firefly Encyclopedia of Insects and Spiders, edited by Christopher O'Toole, ISBN 1-55297-612-2, 2002
- Natural History Museum Lepidoptera genus database
