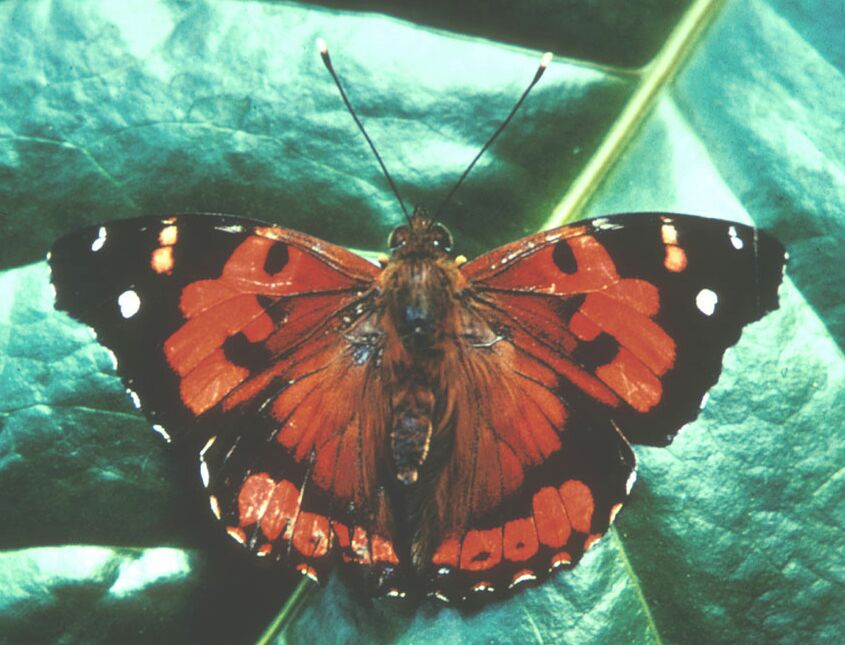
- Kamehameha

Scientific classification
- Kingdom: Animalia
- Phylum: Arthropoda
- Class: Insecta
- Order: Lepidoptera
- Clade: Neolepidoptera
- Infraorder: Heteroneura
- Clade: Eulepidoptera; Kiriakoff, 1948

Subdivisions
- Incurvariina; Superfamily Andesianoidea; Superfamily Adeloidea; Etimonotrysia; Superfamily Palaephatoidea; Superfamily Tischerioidea; Ditrysia; 30 superfamilies

= Eulepidoptera =

Clade of insects

Eulepidoptera represents a major clade within the infraorder Heteroneura, encompassing the vast majority of moth and butterfly species. It includes both primitive lineages such as Incurvariina and Etimonotrysia, as well as the highly diverse Ditrysia, which alone accounts for approximately 98% of all described Lepidoptera species. Members of Eulepidoptera are characterized by advanced wing coupling mechanisms, specialized larval stages, and a broad range of ecological roles, including pollination and agricultural pest activity. The evolutionary success of this clade is often attributed to its adaptability, co-evolution with flowering plants, and complex life cycles. Eulepidoptera was formally described by Kiriakoff in 1948 and remains a central focus in lepidopteran systematics and biodiversity research.

== See also ==
- Taxonomy of Lepidoptera
