= Ogygioses caliginosa =

Scientific classification
- Kingdom: Animalia
- Phylum: Arthropoda
- Class: Insecta
- Order: Lepidoptera
- Family: Palaeosetidae
- Genus: Ogygioses
- Species: O. caliginosa

Binomial name
- Ogygioses caliginosa Issiki and Stringer, 1932

Species of moth

Ogygioses caliginosa is a species of moth of the family Palaeosetidae. It is only known from Taiwan.
