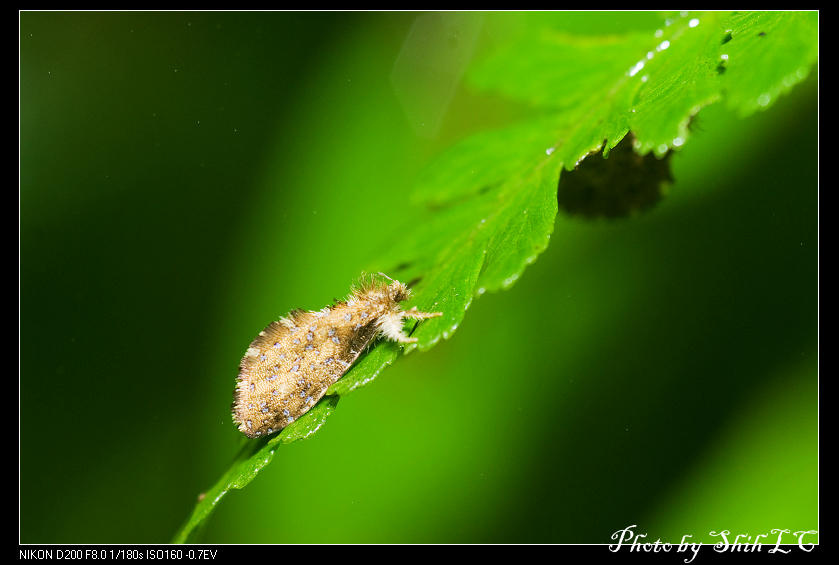

Scientific classification
- Kingdom: Animalia
- Phylum: Arthropoda
- Class: Insecta
- Order: Lepidoptera
- Family: Palaeosetidae
- Genus: Ogygioses
- Species: O. issikii

Binomial name
- Ogygioses issikii Davis, 1995

= Ogygioses issikii =

Species of moth

Ogygioses issikii is a species of moth of the family Palaeosetidae. It is only known from Taiwan.

The genus Ogygioses currently includes four recognized species: O. caliginosa, O. eurata, O. issikii, and O. luangensis

The known species of Ogygioses inhabiting Taiwan appear to occupy a variety of elevations and forest-types across the island, from low elevations (around ~300 m) to much higher montane zones.
