= Ogygioses luangensis =

Scientific classification
- Kingdom: Animalia
- Phylum: Arthropoda
- Class: Insecta
- Order: Lepidoptera
- Family: Palaeosetidae
- Genus: Ogygioses
- Species: O. luangensis

Binomial name
- Ogygioses luangensis Kristensen, 1995

Species of moth

Ogygioses luangensis is a species of moth of the family Palaeosetidae. It is found in Thailand.
