= Osrhoes =

Scientific classification
- Kingdom: Animalia
- Phylum: Arthropoda
- Class: Insecta
- Order: Lepidoptera
- Family: Palaeosetidae
- Genus: Osrhoes; H. Druce, 1900
- Species: O. coronta

Binomial name
- Osrhoes coronta H. Druce, 1900

Genus of moths

Osrhoes is a monotypic moth genus of the family Palaeosetidae. Its only species, Osrhoes coronta, is only known from Colombia. Both the genus and species were first described by Herbert Druce in 1900.
