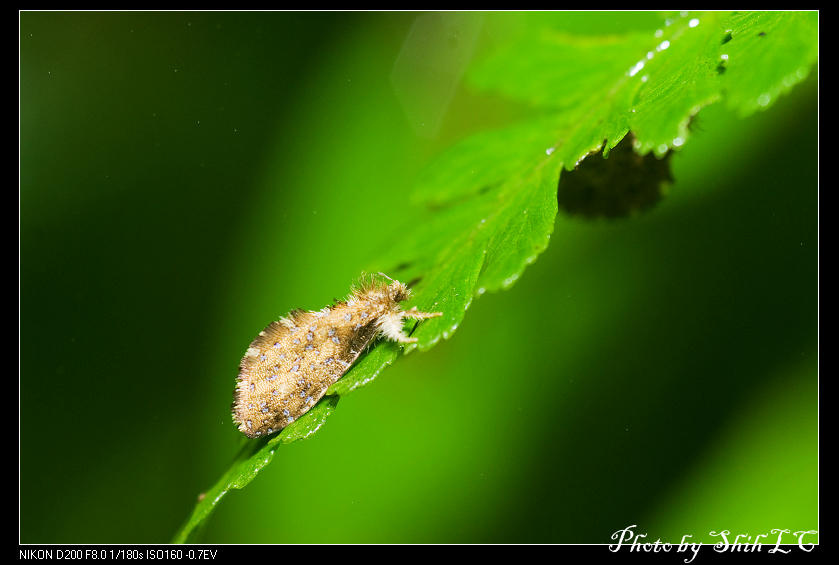
- Ogygioses eurata

Scientific classification
- Kingdom: Animalia
- Phylum: Arthropoda
- Clade: Pancrustacea
- Class: Insecta
- Order: Lepidoptera
- Family: Palaeosetidae
- Genus: Ogygioses; Issiki and Stringer, 1932

= Ogygioses =

Genus of moths

Ogygioses is a genus of moths of the family Palaeosetidae. Ogygioses luangensis is found in Thailand and the other Ogygioses species are found in Taiwan.

== Species ==
- Ogygioses caliginosa Issiki and Stringer, 1932
- Ogygioses eurata Issiki and Stringer, 1932
- Ogygioses issikii Davis, 1995
- Ogygioses luangensis Kristensen, 1995
