= Palaeoses =

Scientific classification
- Domain: Eukaryota
- Kingdom: Animalia
- Phylum: Arthropoda
- Class: Insecta
- Order: Lepidoptera
- Family: Palaeosetidae
- Genus: Palaeoses; Turner, 1922
- Species: P. scholastica

Binomial name
- Palaeoses scholastica Turner, 1922

Genus of moths

Palaeoses is a genus of moths of the family Palaeosetidae. It consists of only one species, Palaeoses scholastica, which is only known from Queensland.
