= Palaeosetidae =

Scientific classification
- Kingdom: Animalia
- Phylum: Arthropoda
- Clade: Pancrustacea
- Class: Insecta
- Order: Lepidoptera
- Clade: Myoglossata
- Clade: Neolepidoptera
- Infraorder: Exoporia
- Superfamily: Hepialoidea
- Family: Palaeosetidae

Genera and species
- Palaeoses Turner, 1922; Palaeoses scholastica Turner, 1922; Genustes Issiki and Stringer, 1932; Genustes lutata Issiki and Stringer, 1932; Ogygioses Issiki and Stringer, 1932; Ogygioses caliginosa Issiki and Stringer, 1932; Ogygioses eurata Issiki and Stringer, 1932; Ogygioses issikii Davis, 1995; Ogygioses luangensis Kristensen, 1995; Osrhoes Druce, 1900; Osrhoes coronta Druce, 1900

Diversity
- 4 genera and 7 species

Family of moths

The Palaeosetidae or miniature ghost moths are a family of insects in the order Lepidoptera contained within the superfamily Hepialoidea.

== Taxonomy and systematics ==
The Palaeosetidae are a primitive family of Hepialoidea with four currently recognised genera and seven species.

== Distribution ==
One genus occurs in Colombia (Osrhoes) and the other three genera have an Old World distribution from Assam to Australia.
