= Genustes =

Scientific classification
- Kingdom: Animalia
- Phylum: Arthropoda
- Class: Insecta
- Order: Lepidoptera
- Family: Palaeosetidae
- Genus: Genustes; Issiki and Stringer, 1932
- Species: G. lutata

Binomial name
- Genustes lutata Issiki and Stringer, 1932

Genus of moths

Genustes is a genus of moths of the family Palaeosetidae. It consists of only one species, Genustes lutata, which is only known from India.
