= Orthogonius cruralis =

Scientific classification
- Domain: Eukaryota
- Kingdom: Animalia
- Phylum: Arthropoda
- Class: Insecta
- Order: Coleoptera
- Suborder: Adephaga
- Family: Carabidae
- Genus: Orthogonius
- Species: O. cruralis

Binomial name
- Orthogonius cruralis Putzeys in Chaudoir, 1871

Species of beetle

Orthogonius cruralis is a species of ground beetle in the subfamily Orthogoniinae. It was described by Putzeys in Chaudoir in 1871.
