= Orthogonius acrogonus =

Scientific classification
- Domain: Eukaryota
- Kingdom: Animalia
- Phylum: Arthropoda
- Class: Insecta
- Order: Coleoptera
- Suborder: Adephaga
- Family: Carabidae
- Genus: Orthogonius
- Species: O. acrogonus

Binomial name
- Orthogonius acrogonus (Wiedemann, 1819)

Species of beetle

Orthogonius acrogonus is a species of ground beetle in the subfamily Orthogoniinae. It was described by Wiedemann in 1819.
