= Orthogonius equimarginalis =

Scientific classification
- Domain: Eukaryota
- Kingdom: Animalia
- Phylum: Arthropoda
- Class: Insecta
- Order: Coleoptera
- Suborder: Adephaga
- Family: Carabidae
- Genus: Orthogonius
- Species: O. equimarginalis

Binomial name
- Orthogonius equimarginalis Tian & Deuve, 2006

Species of beetle

Orthogonius equimarginalis is a species of ground beetle in the subfamily Orthogoniinae. It was described by Tian & Deuve in 2006.

It lives and breeds in the soil. It is suspected that it feeds on decaying material and other insects. It has wings but is unable to fly. It has a small head with antennae and big eyes on the sides, the thorax, and the abdomen.
