= Orthogonius opacus =

Scientific classification
- Kingdom: Animalia
- Phylum: Arthropoda
- Class: Insecta
- Order: Coleoptera
- Suborder: Adephaga
- Family: Carabidae
- Genus: Orthogonius
- Species: O. opacus

Binomial name
- Orthogonius opacus Schmidt-Goebel, 1846

Species of beetle

Orthogonius opacus is a species of ground beetle in the subfamily Orthogoniinae. It was described by Schmidt-Gobel in 1846.
