= Orthogonius stygius =

Scientific classification
- Domain: Eukaryota
- Kingdom: Animalia
- Phylum: Arthropoda
- Class: Insecta
- Order: Coleoptera
- Suborder: Adephaga
- Family: Carabidae
- Genus: Orthogonius
- Species: O. stygius

Binomial name
- Orthogonius stygius Andrewes, 1930

Species of beetle

Orthogonius stygius is a species of ground beetle in the subfamily Orthogoniinae. It was described by Andrewes in 1930.
