= Orthogonius sulcatus =

Scientific classification
- Domain: Eukaryota
- Kingdom: Animalia
- Phylum: Arthropoda
- Class: Insecta
- Order: Coleoptera
- Suborder: Adephaga
- Family: Carabidae
- Genus: Orthogonius
- Species: O. sulcatus

Binomial name
- Orthogonius sulcatus Schmidt-Goebel, 1846

Species of beetle

Orthogonius sulcatus is a species of ground beetle in the subfamily Orthogoniinae. It was described by Schmidt-Goebel in 1846.
