= Orthogonius capucinus =

Scientific classification
- Kingdom: Animalia
- Phylum: Arthropoda
- Class: Insecta
- Order: Coleoptera
- Suborder: Adephaga
- Family: Carabidae
- Genus: Orthogonius
- Species: O. capucinus

Binomial name
- Orthogonius capucinus Boheman, 1848

Species of beetle

Orthogonius capucinus is a species of ground beetle in the subfamily Orthogoniinae. It was described by Boheman in 1848.
