= Orthogonius drescheri =

Scientific classification
- Domain: Eukaryota
- Kingdom: Animalia
- Phylum: Arthropoda
- Class: Insecta
- Order: Coleoptera
- Suborder: Adephaga
- Family: Carabidae
- Genus: Orthogonius
- Species: O. drescheri

Binomial name
- Orthogonius drescheri Liebke, 1937

Species of beetle

Orthogonius drescheri is a species of ground beetle in the subfamily Orthogoniinae. It was described by Liebke in 1937.
