= Orthogonius tikekee =

Scientific classification
- Domain: Eukaryota
- Kingdom: Animalia
- Phylum: Arthropoda
- Class: Insecta
- Order: Coleoptera
- Suborder: Adephaga
- Family: Carabidae
- Genus: Orthogonius
- Species: O. tikekee

Binomial name
- Orthogonius tikekee Tian & Deuve, 2006

Species of beetle

Orthogonius tikekee is a species of ground beetle in the subfamily Orthogoniinae. It was described by Tian & Deuve in 2006.
