= Orthogonius rhodesiensis =

Scientific classification
- Domain: Eukaryota
- Kingdom: Animalia
- Phylum: Arthropoda
- Class: Insecta
- Order: Coleoptera
- Suborder: Adephaga
- Family: Carabidae
- Genus: Orthogonius
- Species: O. rhodesiensis

Binomial name
- Orthogonius rhodesiensis Lorenz, 1998

Species of beetle

Orthogonius rhodesiensis is a species of ground beetle in the subfamily Orthogoniinae. It was described by Lorenz in 1998.
