= Orthogonius deletus =

Scientific classification
- Domain: Eukaryota
- Kingdom: Animalia
- Phylum: Arthropoda
- Class: Insecta
- Order: Coleoptera
- Suborder: Adephaga
- Family: Carabidae
- Genus: Orthogonius
- Species: O. deletus

Binomial name
- Orthogonius deletus Schmidt-Gobel, 1846

Species of beetle

Orthogonius deletus is a species of ground beetle in the subfamily Orthogoniinae. It was described by Schmidt-Gobel in 1846.
