= Orthogonius assmuthi =

Scientific classification
- Domain: Eukaryota
- Kingdom: Animalia
- Phylum: Arthropoda
- Class: Insecta
- Order: Coleoptera
- Suborder: Adephaga
- Family: Carabidae
- Genus: Orthogonius
- Species: O. assmuthi

Binomial name
- Orthogonius assmuthi Wasmann, 1920

Species of beetle

Orthogonius assmuthi is a species of ground beetle in the subfamily Orthogoniinae. It was described by Wasmann in 1920.
