= Orthogonius clarkii =

Scientific classification
- Domain: Eukaryota
- Kingdom: Animalia
- Phylum: Arthropoda
- Class: Insecta
- Order: Coleoptera
- Suborder: Adephaga
- Family: Carabidae
- Subfamily: Orthogoniinae
- Genus: Orthogonius
- Species: O. clarkii

Binomial name
- Orthogonius clarkii Murray, 1858

Species of beetle

Orthogonius clarkii is a species in the beetle family Carabidae. It is found in Africa.
