= Orthogonius hopei =

Scientific classification
- Domain: Eukaryota
- Kingdom: Animalia
- Phylum: Arthropoda
- Class: Insecta
- Order: Coleoptera
- Suborder: Adephaga
- Family: Carabidae
- Genus: Orthogonius
- Species: O. hopei

Binomial name
- Orthogonius hopei Gray, 1832

Species of beetle

Orthogonius hopei is a species of ground beetle in the subfamily Orthogoniinae. It was described by George Robert Gray in 1832.

This species has been cited from India and Malay Peninsula. It has also been recorded from Singapore in 2007.
