= Orthogonius pinguis =

Scientific classification
- Domain: Eukaryota
- Kingdom: Animalia
- Phylum: Arthropoda
- Class: Insecta
- Order: Coleoptera
- Suborder: Adephaga
- Family: Carabidae
- Genus: Orthogonius
- Species: O. pinguis

Binomial name
- Orthogonius pinguis Murray, 1858

Species of beetle

Orthogonius pinguis is a species of ground beetle in the subfamily Orthogoniinae. It was described by Murray in 1858.
