= Orthogonius balthasari =

Scientific classification
- Domain: Eukaryota
- Kingdom: Animalia
- Phylum: Arthropoda
- Class: Insecta
- Order: Coleoptera
- Suborder: Adephaga
- Family: Carabidae
- Genus: Orthogonius
- Species: O. balthasari

Binomial name
- Orthogonius balthasari Jedlicka, 1935

Species of beetle

Orthogonius balthasari is a species of ground beetle in the subfamily Orthogoniinae. It was described by Jedlicka in 1935.
