= Orthogonius brevilabris =

Scientific classification
- Domain: Eukaryota
- Kingdom: Animalia
- Phylum: Arthropoda
- Class: Insecta
- Order: Coleoptera
- Suborder: Adephaga
- Family: Carabidae
- Genus: Orthogonius
- Species: O. brevilabris

Binomial name
- Orthogonius brevilabris H.Kolbe, 1889

Species of beetle

Orthogonius brevilabris is a species of ground beetle in the subfamily Orthogoniinae. It was described by H.Kolbe in 1889.
