= Orthogonius kickeli =

Scientific classification
- Domain: Eukaryota
- Kingdom: Animalia
- Phylum: Arthropoda
- Class: Insecta
- Order: Coleoptera
- Suborder: Adephaga
- Family: Carabidae
- Genus: Orthogonius
- Species: O. kickeli

Binomial name
- Orthogonius kickeli H.Kolbe, 1896

Species of beetle

Orthogonius kickeli is a species of ground beetle in the subfamily Orthogoniinae. It was described by H.Kolbe in 1896.
