= Orthogonius brevithorax =

Scientific classification
- Kingdom: Animalia
- Phylum: Arthropoda
- Class: Insecta
- Order: Coleoptera
- Suborder: Adephaga
- Family: Carabidae
- Genus: Orthogonius
- Species: O. brevithorax

Binomial name
- Orthogonius brevithorax Dejean, 1825

Species of beetle

Orthogonius brevithorax is a species of ground beetle in the subfamily Orthogoniinae. It was described by Pierre François Marie Auguste Dejean in 1825.
