= Orthogonius bicolor =

Scientific classification
- Domain: Eukaryota
- Kingdom: Animalia
- Phylum: Arthropoda
- Class: Insecta
- Order: Coleoptera
- Suborder: Adephaga
- Family: Carabidae
- Genus: Orthogonius
- Species: O. bicolor

Binomial name
- Orthogonius bicolor Jedlicka, 1965

Species of beetle

Orthogonius bicolor is a species of ground beetle in the subfamily Orthogoniinae. It was described by Jedlicka in 1965.
