= Orthogonius lieftincki =

Scientific classification
- Domain: Eukaryota
- Kingdom: Animalia
- Phylum: Arthropoda
- Class: Insecta
- Order: Coleoptera
- Suborder: Adephaga
- Family: Carabidae
- Genus: Orthogonius
- Species: O. lieftincki

Binomial name
- Orthogonius lieftincki Andrewes, 1936

Species of beetle

Orthogonius lieftincki is a species of ground beetle in the subfamily Orthogoniinae. It was described by Andrewes in 1936.
