= Orthogonius saundersi =

Scientific classification
- Kingdom: Animalia
- Phylum: Arthropoda
- Class: Insecta
- Order: Coleoptera
- Suborder: Adephaga
- Family: Carabidae
- Genus: Orthogonius
- Species: O. saundersi

Binomial name
- Orthogonius saundersi Andrewes, 1926

Species of beetle

Orthogonius saundersi is a species of ground beetle in the subfamily Orthogoniinae. It was described by Andrewes in 1926.
