= Orthogonius planiger =

Scientific classification
- Domain: Eukaryota
- Kingdom: Animalia
- Phylum: Arthropoda
- Class: Insecta
- Order: Coleoptera
- Suborder: Adephaga
- Family: Carabidae
- Genus: Orthogonius
- Species: O. planiger

Binomial name
- Orthogonius planiger (Walker, 1858)

Species of beetle

Orthogonius planiger is a species of ground beetle in the subfamily Orthogoniinae. It was described by Francis Walker in 1858.
