= Orthogonius davidi =

Scientific classification
- Domain: Eukaryota
- Kingdom: Animalia
- Phylum: Arthropoda
- Class: Insecta
- Order: Coleoptera
- Suborder: Adephaga
- Family: Carabidae
- Genus: Orthogonius
- Species: O. davidi

Binomial name
- Orthogonius davidi Chaudoir, 1878

Species of beetle

Orthogonius davidi is a species of ground beetle in the subfamily Orthogoniinae. It was described by Maximilien Chaudoir in 1878.
