= Orthogonius dispar =

Scientific classification
- Domain: Eukaryota
- Kingdom: Animalia
- Phylum: Arthropoda
- Class: Insecta
- Order: Coleoptera
- Suborder: Adephaga
- Family: Carabidae
- Genus: Orthogonius
- Species: O. dispar

Binomial name
- Orthogonius dispar Bates, 1892

Species of beetle

Orthogonius dispar is a species of ground beetle in the subfamily Orthogoniinae. It was described by Henry Walter Bates in 1892.
