= Orthogonius dupuisi =

Scientific classification
- Domain: Eukaryota
- Kingdom: Animalia
- Phylum: Arthropoda
- Class: Insecta
- Order: Coleoptera
- Suborder: Adephaga
- Family: Carabidae
- Genus: Orthogonius
- Species: O. dupuisi

Binomial name
- Orthogonius dupuisi Basilewsky, 1948

Species of beetle

Orthogonius dupuisi is a species of ground beetle in the subfamily Orthogoniinae. It was described by Basilewsky in 1948.
