= Orthogonius kumatai =

Scientific classification
- Kingdom: Animalia
- Phylum: Arthropoda
- Class: Insecta
- Order: Coleoptera
- Suborder: Adephaga
- Family: Carabidae
- Genus: Orthogonius
- Species: O. kumatai

Binomial name
- Orthogonius kumatai Habu, 1979

Species of beetle

Orthogonius kumatai is a species of ground beetle in the subfamily Orthogoniinae. It was described by Habu in 1979.
