= Orthogonius duplicatus =

Scientific classification
- Domain: Eukaryota
- Kingdom: Animalia
- Phylum: Arthropoda
- Class: Insecta
- Order: Coleoptera
- Suborder: Adephaga
- Family: Carabidae
- Genus: Orthogonius
- Species: O. duplicatus

Binomial name
- Orthogonius duplicatus (Wiedemann, 1819)

Species of beetle

Orthogonius duplicatus is a species of ground beetle in the subfamily Orthogoniinae. It was described by Wiedemann in 1819.
