= Orthogonius femoralis =

Scientific classification
- Domain: Eukaryota
- Kingdom: Animalia
- Phylum: Arthropoda
- Class: Insecta
- Order: Coleoptera
- Suborder: Adephaga
- Family: Carabidae
- Genus: Orthogonius
- Species: O. femoralis

Binomial name
- Orthogonius femoralis Chaudoir, 1848

Species of beetle

Orthogonius femoralis is a species of ground beetle in the subfamily Orthogoniinae. It was described by Maximilien Chaudoir in 1848.
