= Orthogonius xanthomerus =

Scientific classification
- Domain: Eukaryota
- Kingdom: Animalia
- Phylum: Arthropoda
- Class: Insecta
- Order: Coleoptera
- Suborder: Adephaga
- Family: Carabidae
- Genus: Orthogonius
- Species: O. xanthomerus

Binomial name
- Orthogonius xanthomerus L. Redtenbacher, 1867

Species of beetle

Orthogonius xanthomerus is a species of ground beetle in the subfamily Orthogoniinae. It was described by L. Redtenbacher in 1867.
