= Orthogonius perpuncticollis =

Scientific classification
- Kingdom: Animalia
- Phylum: Arthropoda
- Class: Insecta
- Order: Coleoptera
- Suborder: Adephaga
- Family: Carabidae
- Genus: Orthogonius
- Species: O. perpuncticollis

Binomial name
- Orthogonius perpuncticollis Burgeon, 1937

Species of beetle

Orthogonius perpuncticollis is a species of ground beetle in the subfamily Orthogoniinae. It was described by Burgeon in 1937.
