= Orthogonius termiticola =

Scientific classification
- Domain: Eukaryota
- Kingdom: Animalia
- Phylum: Arthropoda
- Class: Insecta
- Order: Coleoptera
- Suborder: Adephaga
- Family: Carabidae
- Genus: Orthogonius
- Species: O. termiticola

Binomial name
- Orthogonius termiticola Wasmann, 1902

Species of beetle

Orthogonius termiticola is a species of ground beetle in the subfamily Orthogoniinae. It was described by Wasmann in 1902.
