= Orthogonius picilabris =

Scientific classification
- Kingdom: Animalia
- Phylum: Arthropoda
- Class: Insecta
- Order: Coleoptera
- Suborder: Adephaga
- Family: Carabidae
- Genus: Orthogonius
- Species: O. picilabris

Binomial name
- Orthogonius picilabris W.S.Macleay, 1825

Species of beetle

Orthogonius picilabris is a species of ground beetle in the subfamily Orthogoniinae. It was described by W. S. Macleay in 1825.
