= Orthogonius impunctipennis =

Scientific classification
- Domain: Eukaryota
- Kingdom: Animalia
- Phylum: Arthropoda
- Class: Insecta
- Order: Coleoptera
- Suborder: Adephaga
- Family: Carabidae
- Genus: Orthogonius
- Species: O. impunctipennis

Binomial name
- Orthogonius impunctipennis Quedenfeldt, 1883

Species of beetle

Orthogonius impunctipennis is a species of ground beetle in the subfamily Orthogoniinae. It was described by Quedenfeldt in 1883.
