= Orthogonius flavipes =

Scientific classification
- Domain: Eukaryota
- Kingdom: Animalia
- Phylum: Arthropoda
- Class: Insecta
- Order: Coleoptera
- Suborder: Adephaga
- Family: Carabidae
- Genus: Orthogonius
- Species: O. flavipes

Binomial name
- Orthogonius flavipes Deuve, 2004

Species of beetle

Orthogonius flavipes is a species of ground beetle in the subfamily Orthogoniinae. It was described by Deuve in 2004.
