= Orthogonius buquetii =

Scientific classification
- Kingdom: Animalia
- Phylum: Arthropoda
- Class: Insecta
- Order: Coleoptera
- Suborder: Adephaga
- Family: Carabidae
- Genus: Orthogonius
- Species: O. buquetii

Binomial name
- Orthogonius buquetii Chaudoir, 1850

Species of beetle

Orthogonius buquetii is a species of ground beetle in the subfamily Orthogoniinae, found in Sierra Leone and Ivory Coast. It was described by Maximilien Chaudoir in 1850.
