= Orthogonius alternans =

Scientific classification
- Domain: Eukaryota
- Kingdom: Animalia
- Phylum: Arthropoda
- Class: Insecta
- Order: Coleoptera
- Suborder: Adephaga
- Family: Carabidae
- Genus: Orthogonius
- Species: O. alternans

Binomial name
- Orthogonius alternans (Wiedemann, 1823)

Species of beetle

Orthogonius alternans is a species of ground beetle in the subfamily Orthogoniinae. It was described by Wiedemann in 1823.
