= O. nepalensis =

O. nepalensis may refer to:

- Ophiocordyceps nepalensis, a parasitic fungus
- Oreorchis nepalensis, a plant native to Asia
- Orthogonius nepalensis, a ground beetle
- Orthosia nepalensis, an owlet moth
