= Orthogonius rufotestaceus =

Scientific classification
- Domain: Eukaryota
- Kingdom: Animalia
- Phylum: Arthropoda
- Class: Insecta
- Order: Coleoptera
- Suborder: Adephaga
- Family: Carabidae
- Genus: Orthogonius
- Species: O. rufotestaceus

Binomial name
- Orthogonius rufotestaceus G.Muller, 1941

Species of beetle

Orthogonius rufotestaceus is a species of ground beetle in the subfamily Orthogoniinae. It was described by G.Muller in 1941.
