= Orthogonius caffer =

Scientific classification
- Kingdom: Animalia
- Phylum: Arthropoda
- Class: Insecta
- Order: Coleoptera
- Suborder: Adephaga
- Family: Carabidae
- Genus: Orthogonius
- Species: O. caffer

Binomial name
- Orthogonius caffer Boheman, 1848

Species of beetle

Orthogonius caffer is a species of ground beetle in the subfamily Orthogoniinae. It was described by Boheman in 1848.
