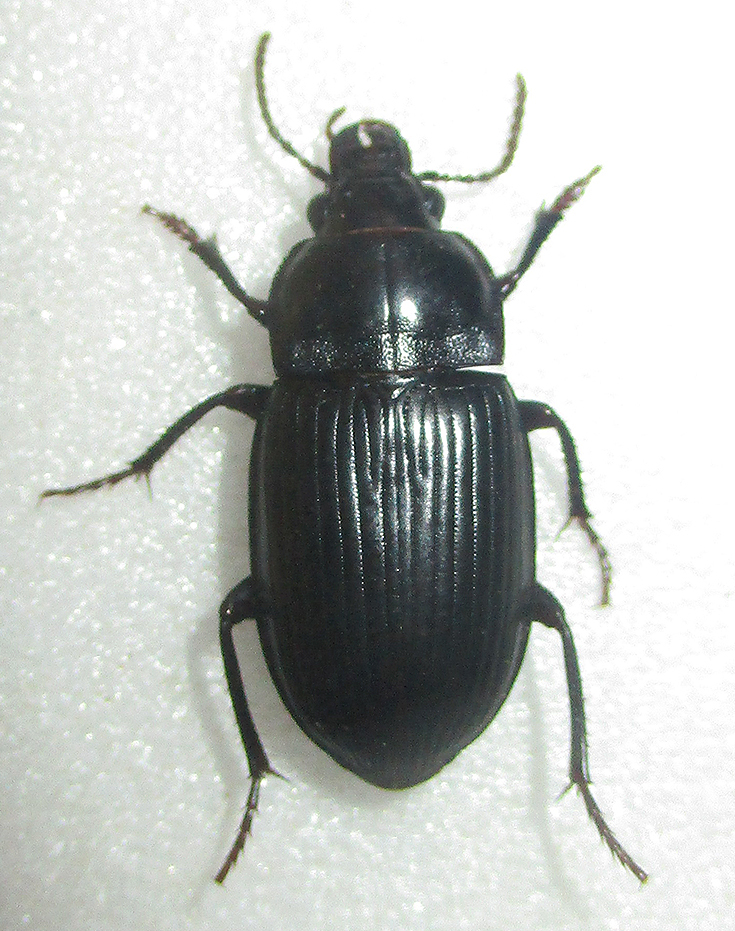
- Rathymus melanarius, Botswana

Scientific classification
- Kingdom: Animalia
- Phylum: Arthropoda
- Class: Insecta
- Order: Coleoptera
- Suborder: Adephaga
- Family: Carabidae
- Subfamily: Orthogoniinae
- Tribe: Idiomorphini
- Subtribe: Idiomorphina
- Genus: Rathymus; Dejean, 1831

Synonyms
- Parastrigia Maindron, 1906; Rathymus Brulle, 1834; Rhathymnus Péringuey, 1926; Rhathymus Agassiz, 1846

= Rathymus =

Genus of beetles

Rathymus is a genus in the ground beetle family Carabidae. There are at least three described species in Rathymus, found in Africa.

== Species ==
These three species belong to the genus Rathymus:

- Rathymus carbonarius Dejean, 1831 (Senegal/Gambia, Guinea-Bissau, Mali, Burkina Faso, Nigeria, Niger, Chad)
- Rathymus melanarius Klug, 1853 (Tanzania, Malawi, Mozambique, Namibia, South Africa)
- Rathymus saganicola (G.Müller, 1941) (Ethiopia)
