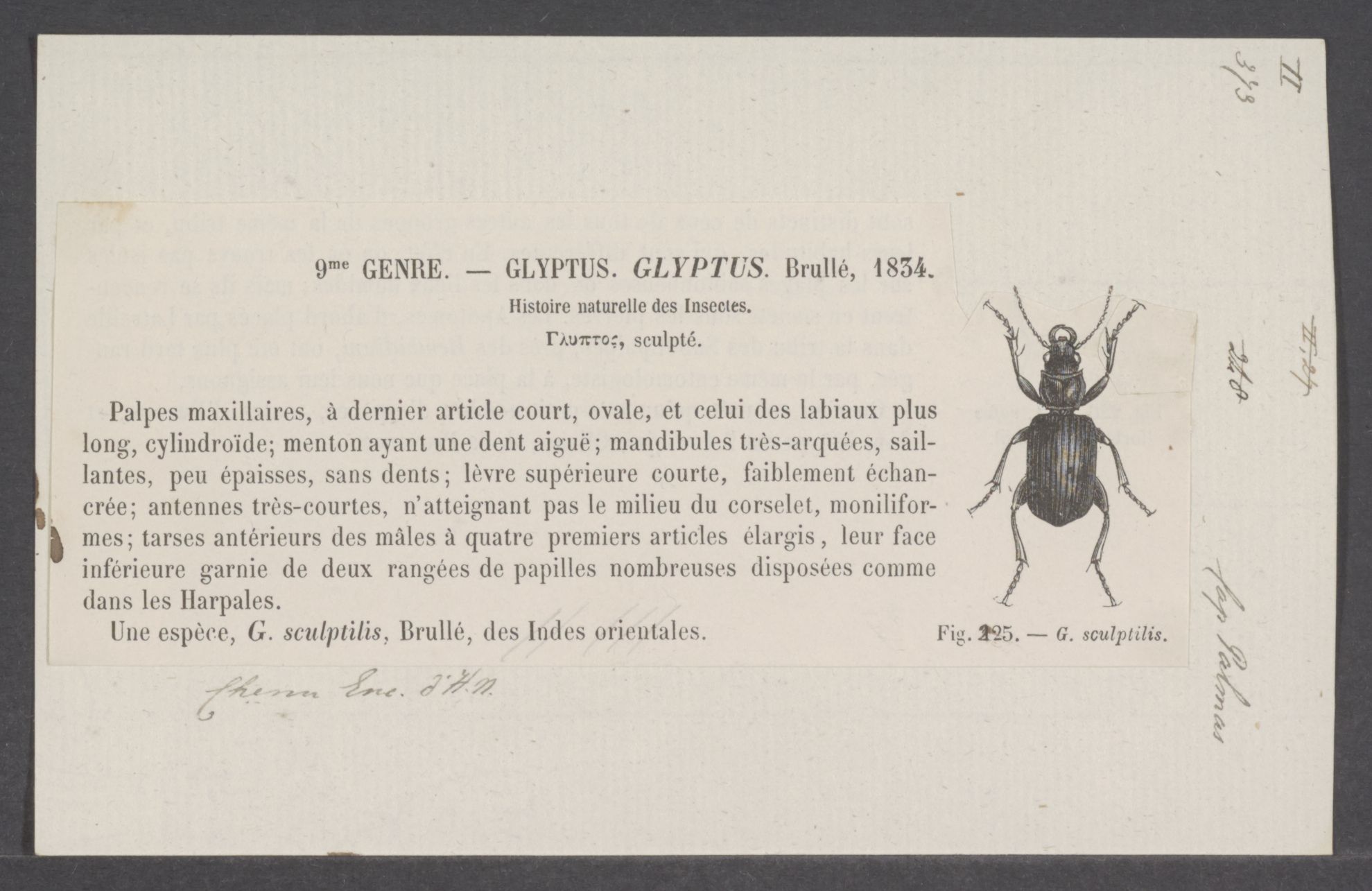

Scientific classification
- Domain: Eukaryota
- Kingdom: Animalia
- Phylum: Arthropoda
- Class: Insecta
- Order: Coleoptera
- Suborder: Adephaga
- Family: Carabidae
- Subfamily: Orthogoniinae
- Tribe: Orthogoniini
- Subtribe: Glyptina
- Genus: Glyptus; Brullé, 1837

= Glyptus =

Genus of beetles

Glyptus is a genus in the ground beetle family Carabidae. There are at least two described species in Glyptus, found in Africa.

== Species ==
These two species belong to the genus Glyptus:

- Glyptus insignis Gestro, 1895 (Ethiopia)
- Glyptus sculptilis Brullé, 1837 (Guinea, Ivory Coast, Togo, Congo, DR Congo, Tanzania)
