= Orthogonius nepalensis =

Scientific classification
- Kingdom: Animalia
- Phylum: Arthropoda
- Class: Insecta
- Order: Coleoptera
- Suborder: Adephaga
- Family: Carabidae
- Genus: Orthogonius
- Species: O. nepalensis

Binomial name
- Orthogonius nepalensis Habu, 1979

Species of beetle

Orthogonius nepalensis is a species of ground beetle in the subfamily Orthogoniinae. It was described by Habu in 1979.
