= Anoncopeucus =

Scientific classification
- Domain: Eukaryota
- Kingdom: Animalia
- Phylum: Arthropoda
- Class: Insecta
- Order: Coleoptera
- Suborder: Adephaga
- Family: Carabidae
- Subfamily: Orthogoniinae
- Tribe: Orthogoniini
- Genus: Anoncopeucus de Chaudoir, 1871

Genus of beetles

Anoncopeucus is a small genus of beetles first named in 1871 by Russian entomologist Maximilien Chaudoir. Anoncopeucus is part of the tribe Orthogoninii, a small group of ground beetles native to subtropical Asia and North Africa. Species in the genus Anoncopeucus occur in Thailand, Indonesia, and Borneo.

There are two species in the genus Anoncopeucus:

- Anoncopeucus curvatus Burgeon, 1936
- Anoncopeucus curvipes (Dejean & Boisduval, 1829)
