= Neoglyptus =

Scientific classification
- Domain: Eukaryota
- Kingdom: Animalia
- Phylum: Arthropoda
- Class: Insecta
- Order: Coleoptera
- Suborder: Adephaga
- Family: Carabidae
- Subfamily: Orthogoniinae
- Tribe: Orthogoniini
- Subtribe: Glyptina
- Genus: Neoglyptus; Basilewsky, 1953

Genus of beetles

Neoglyptus is a genus in the ground beetle family Carabidae. There are about seven described species in Neoglyptus, found in Africa.

== Species ==
These seven species belong to the genus Neoglyptus:

- Neoglyptus abyssinicus (Burgeon, 1936) (Somalia, Tanzania)
- Neoglyptus aciculatus Lecordier, 1968 (Ivory Coast)
- Neoglyptus bayeri (Burgeon, 1936) (Kenya)
- Neoglyptus brevicornis (Péringuey, 1896) (DR Congo, Mozambique, Zimbabwe, South Africa)
- Neoglyptus congoensis (Burgeon, 1936) (DR Congo)
- Neoglyptus pectinatus (Alluaud, 1927) (DR Congo, Tanzania)
- Neoglyptus punctulatus (Chaudoir, 1862) (Ivory Coast, Somalia, DR Congo, Kenya, Tanzania, Mozambique, Zimbabwe, South Africa)
