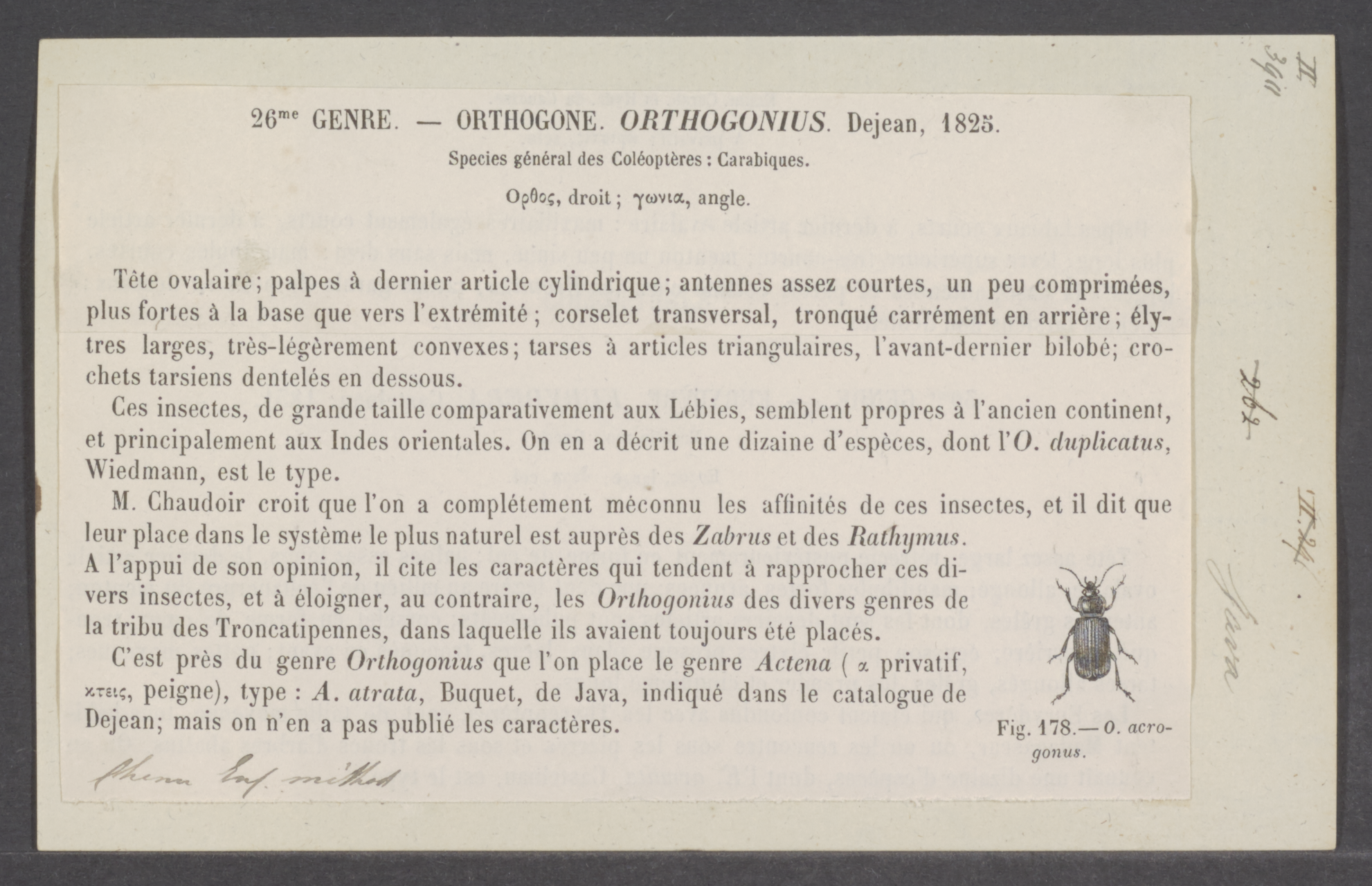

Scientific classification
- Domain: Eukaryota
- Kingdom: Animalia
- Phylum: Arthropoda
- Class: Insecta
- Order: Coleoptera
- Suborder: Adephaga
- Superfamily: Caraboidea
- Family: Carabidae
- Subfamily: Orthogoniinae
- Genus: Orthogonius; W.S.MacLeay, 1825

= Orthogonius =

Genus of beetles

Orthogonius is a genus of beetles in the family Carabidae, containing the following species:

- Orthogonius aberlenci Tian & Deuve, 2016 (Laos)
- Orthogonius acrogonus (Wiedemann, 1819) (Malaysia, Indonesia, and Borneo)
- Orthogonius acutangulus Chaudoir, 1878 (Sri Lanka)
- Orthogonius adoriae Tian & Deuve, 2006 (India)
- Orthogonius aemulus Péringuey, 1896 (Zimbabwe, Botswana, and Namibia)
- Orthogonius alternans (Wiedemann, 1823) (Indomalaya)
- Orthogonius alutaceus Quedenfeldt, 1883 (Africa)
- Orthogonius andrewesi Emden, 1928 (Philippines)
- Orthogonius andrewesianus Tian & Deuve, 2006 (Malaysia, Singapore, and Indonesia)
- Orthogonius angkor Tian & Deuve, 2006 (Cambodia)
- Orthogonius angkorensis Tian & Deuve, 2008 (Cambodia)
- Orthogonius angustus Chaudoir, 1872 (Thailand, Vietnam, and Malaysia)
- Orthogonius annamensis Jedlicka, 1965 (Vietnam)
- Orthogonius annamicola Tian & Deuve, 2006 (Vietnam)
- Orthogonius annemariae Tian & Deuve, 2006 (India)
- Orthogonius assamensis Tian & Deuve, 2006 (India)
- Orthogonius assamicola Tian & Deuve, 2006 (India)
- Orthogonius assmuthi Wasmann, 1920 (India)
- Orthogonius baconi Chaudoir, 1872 (India and Myanmar)
- Orthogonius baconioides Tian & Sabu, 2009 (India)
- Orthogonius balthasari Jedlicka, 1935 (Philippines)
- Orthogonius batesi Tian & Deuve, 2003 (Sri Lanka)
- Orthogonius batesianus Tian & Deuve, 2007
- Orthogonius batesioides Tian & Deuve, 2006 (India)
- Orthogonius baumi Jedlicka, 1955 (Malaysia)
- Orthogonius becqueti Burgeon, 1937 (Democratic Republic of the Congo and Burundi)
- Orthogonius bellus Tian & Deuve, 2016 (Vietnam)
- Orthogonius bicolor Jedlicka, 1965 (Vietnam)
- Orthogonius borneoensis Tian & Deuve, 2006 (Indonesia and Borneo)
- Orthogonius brancuccii Tian & Deuve, 2006 (Thailand)
- Orthogonius brevilabris Kolbe, 1889 (Democratic Republic of the Congo and Angola)
- Orthogonius brevithorax Dejean, 1825 (Africa)
- Orthogonius bruggei Tian & Deuve, 2006 (Malaysia)
- Orthogonius buquetii Chaudoir, 1850 (Sierra Leone and Ivory Coast)
- Orthogonius burckhardti Tian & Deuve, 2006
- Orthogonius burmanensis Tian & Deuve, 2006 (Myanmar)
- Orthogonius caffer Boheman, 1848 (Zimbabwe and South Africa)
- Orthogonius cambodgensis Tian & Deuve, 2006 (Cambodia)
- Orthogonius canaraensis Tian & Deuve, 2006 (India)
- Orthogonius canaraicola Tian & Deuve, 2006 (India)
- Orthogonius capucinus Boheman, 1848 (Zimbabwe and South Africa)
- Orthogonius carbonicolor Tian & Deuve, 2006 (Myanmar)
- Orthogonius carinatus Tian & Deuve, 2013 (Laos)
- Orthogonius celebesicus Tian & Deuve, 2006 (Indonesia)
- Orthogonius ceylanicus Tian & Deuve, 2016 (Sri Lanka)
- Orthogonius chaudoiri Tian & Deuve, 2001 (Vietnam)
- Orthogonius cheni Tian & Deuve, 2001 (China)
- Orthogonius chiangensis Tian & Deuve, 2006 (Thailand)
- Orthogonius clarkii Murray, 1858 (Africa)
- Orthogonius confusus Tian & Deuve, 2006 (Malaysia)
- Orthogonius constanti Tian & Deuve, 2006 (Cambodia)
- Orthogonius constrictus Tian; Deuve & Felix, 2012 (Thailand)
- Orthogonius coomani Tian & Deuve, 2006 (Vietnam)
- Orthogonius coomanioides Tian; Deuve & Felix, 2012 (Thailand)
- Orthogonius coracinus Kolbe, 1895 (Uganda, Rwanda, Burundi, and Tanzania)
- Orthogonius crassicrus Chaudoir, 1872 (Indonesia and Borneo)
- Orthogonius cruralis Putzeys in Chaudoir, 1872
- Orthogonius curvatus Tian & Deuve, 2006 (India)
- Orthogonius cyclothorax Tian & Deuve, 2007 (Singapore)
- Orthogonius davidi Chaudoir, 1878 (China and Taiwan)
- Orthogonius deletus Schmidt-Goebel, 1846 (China, India, Southeast Asia)
- Orthogonius deuvei Tian & Kirschenhofer, 2013 (Vietnam)
- Orthogonius dispar Bates, 1892 (Myanmar)
- Orthogonius dohertyi Tian & Deuve, 2006 (Malaysia)
- Orthogonius dongnanya Tian & Deuve, 2006 (Singapore, Indonesia, and Borneo)
- Orthogonius doriae Putzeys in Chaudoir, 1872 (Indonesia and Borneo)
- Orthogonius drescheri Liebke, 1937 (Indonesia)
- Orthogonius drumonti Tian & Deuve, 2006 (Indonesia)
- Orthogonius duboisi Tian & Deuve, 2006 (China)
- Orthogonius duplicatus (Wiedemann, 1819) (Indomalaya)
- Orthogonius dupuisi Basilewsky, 1948 (Zambia)
- Orthogonius dupuisianus Tian & Deuve, 2010 (Indonesia)
- Orthogonius dureli Tian & Deuve, 2005 (Bhutan and India)
- Orthogonius edentatus Tian & Deuve, 2006 (Malaysia, Indonesia, and Borneo)
- Orthogonius elisabethanus Burgeon, 1937 (Democratic Republic of the Congo)
- Orthogonius emarginatus Tian & Deuve, 2007 (Singapore)
- Orthogonius equimarginalis Tian & Deuve, 2006 (Indonesia)
- Orthogonius euthyphallus Tian & Deuve, 2013 (Laos and Vietnam)
- Orthogonius fairmairei Tian & Deuve, 2006 (Singapore)
- Orthogonius feai Tian & Deuve, 2007
- Orthogonius femoralis Chaudoir, 1848 (Sri Lanka and India)
- Orthogonius flavipes Deuve, 2004 (Indonesia)
- Orthogonius flavus Jedlicka, 1964 (India)
- Orthogonius foveiclypeus Tian & Deuve, 2004 (Indonesia)
- Orthogonius fryi Tian & Deuve, 2006 (Myanmar)
- Orthogonius fugax Chaudoir, 1872 (Sri Lanka)
- Orthogonius gracililamella Tian; Deuve & Felix, 2012 (Thailand)
- Orthogonius gracilipes Tian & Deuve, 2006 (India)
- Orthogonius gracilis Tian & Deuve, 2006 (India)
- Orthogonius grootaerti Tian & Deuve, 2006 (Thailand)
- Orthogonius hageni Oberthür, 1883 (Indonesia)
- Orthogonius himalaya Tian & Deuve, 2006 (Bhutan and India)
- Orthogonius himalayicus Tian & Deuve, 2005 (Bhutan and India)
- Orthogonius hirtulus Tian & Deuve, 2006 (Indonesia)
- Orthogonius hirtus Chaudoir, 1872 (Malaysia and Indonesia)
- Orthogonius hopei Gray, 1832 (Indomalaya)
- Orthogonius huananoides Tian & Deuve, 2006 (Thailand and Vietnam)
- Orthogonius huananus Tian & Deuve, 2001 (China)
- Orthogonius hypocrita Chaudoir, 1872 (Indonesia and Philippines)
- Orthogonius hypocritoides Jedlicka, 1935 (Philippines)
- Orthogonius impunctipennis Quedenfeldt, 1883 (Democratic Republic of the Congo and Angola)
- Orthogonius indicus Tian & Deuve, 2006 (India)
- Orthogonius indophilus Tian & Deuve, 2006 (India)
- Orthogonius inexpectatus Tian & Deuve, 2006 (India)
- Orthogonius inops Chaudoir, 1872 (Indonesia)
- Orthogonius insularis Chaudoir, 1872 (Malaysia, Indonesia, and Borneo)
- Orthogonius intermedius Chaudoir, 1872 (Indonesia)
- Orthogonius javanus Tian & Deuve, 2006 (Taiwan and Indonesia)
- Orthogonius jianfengling Tian & Deuve, 2001 (China)
- Orthogonius kalimantanensis Tian & Deuve, 2006 (Indonesia and Borneo)
- Orthogonius kapiriensis Burgeon, 1937 (Democratic Republic of the Congo)
- Orthogonius katangensis Burgeon, 1937 (Democratic Republic of the Congo)
- Orthogonius kickeli Kolbe, 1895 (Namibia)
- Orthogonius kirirom Tian & Deuve, 2008 (Thailand and Cambodia)
- Orthogonius klickai Jedlicka, 1935 (Philippines)
- Orthogonius kubani Tian & Deuve, 2006 (Thailand)
- Orthogonius kumatai Habu, 1979 (Nepal)
- Orthogonius lancangjiang Tian & Deuve, 2006 (Laos)
- Orthogonius lao Tian & Deuve, 2006 (Laos)
- Orthogonius latreillei Tian & Deuve, 2006 (India)
- Orthogonius latus Hope, 1842 (Africa)
- Orthogonius ledouxi Tian & Deuve, 2006 (Vietnam)
- Orthogonius legrandi Tian & Deuve, 2006 (Malaysia)
- Orthogonius lieftincki Andrewes, 1936 (Indonesia)
- Orthogonius limbourgi Tian & Deuve, 2016 (Vietnam)
- Orthogonius loeicus Tian & Deuve, 2006 (Thailand)
- Orthogonius loeiensis Tian & Deuve, 2006 (Thailand)
- Orthogonius longicornis Chaudoir, 1872 (Sri Lanka and Thailand)
- Orthogonius longilamella Tian & Deuve, 2008
- Orthogonius longipennis Hope, 1842
- Orthogonius longiphallus Tian & Deuve, 2005 (Bhutan)
- Orthogonius lucidus Bates, 1891 (India)
- Orthogonius luzonicus Chaudoir, 1872 (Philippines)
- Orthogonius macrophthalmus Tian & Deuve, 2013 (Vietnam)
- Orthogonius maindronianus Tian & Deuve, 2006 (India)
- Orthogonius makiling Tian & Deuve, 2006 (Philippines)
- Orthogonius malacca Tian & Deuve, 2006 (Malaysia)
- Orthogonius malaisei Andrewes, 1947 (Myanmar)
- Orthogonius malaya Tian & Deuve, 2006 (Malaysia)
- Orthogonius malaysiaensis Tian & Deuve, 2006 (Malaysia)
- Orthogonius medanensis Tian & Deuve, 2006 (Indonesia)
- Orthogonius meghalayaensis Tian & Deuve, 2016 (India)
- Orthogonius mekongensis Tian & Deuve, 2006 (Laos)
- Orthogonius melanipes Tian & Deuve, 2006 (India)
- Orthogonius mellyi (Chaudoir, 1850) (Bangladesh, India, and Myanmar)
- Orthogonius minimus Tian & Deuve, 2006 (India)
- Orthogonius mniszechi Chaudoir, 1872 (India, Malaysia, Indonesia, and Borneo)
- Orthogonius moestus Chaudoir, 1872
- Orthogonius monolophus Andrewes, 1931 (Indonesia and Borneo)
- Orthogonius montanus Tian & Deuve, 2006 (Myanmar)
- Orthogonius morvani Tian & Deuve, 2003 (Thailand)
- Orthogonius morvanianus Tian & Deuve, 2016 (Thailand)
- Orthogonius mouhoti Chaudoir, 1872 (Southeast Asia)
- Orthogonius myanmarensis Tian & Deuve, 2006 (Myanmar)
- Orthogonius nahaeo Tian & Deuve, 2006 (Thailand)
- Orthogonius nepalensis Habu, 1979 (Nepal)
- Orthogonius nepalicus Tian & Deuve, 2006 (Nepal)
- Orthogonius niger Jedlicka, 1935 (Philippines)
- Orthogonius nigripes Tian & Deuve, 2001 (China and Vietnam)
- Orthogonius nongfaensis Tian & Kirschenhofer, 2013 (Laos)
- Orthogonius nyassicus Kolbe, 1895
- Orthogonius obliquepes Tian & Deuve, 2006 (Philippines)
- Orthogonius opacus Schmidt-Goebel, 1846 (Indomalaya)
- Orthogonius orphnodes Andrewes, 1930 (Indonesia)
- Orthogonius ovatulus Tian & Deuve, 2003 (Sri Lanka)
- Orthogonius ovatus Chaudoir, 1878 (Indonesia)
- Orthogonius pachlatkoi Tian & Deuve, 2006 (Thailand)
- Orthogonius palangbangensis Tian & Deuve, 2006 (Indonesia)
- Orthogonius panghongae Tian & Deuve, 2006 (China)
- Orthogonius pangi Tian & Deuve, 2006 (Thailand and Vietnam)
- Orthogonius parallelus Chaudoir, 1872 (Sri Lanka)
- Orthogonius parastantoni Tian & Deuve, 2006 (Sri Lanka)
- Orthogonius parasuturalis Tian & Deuve, 2006 (Indonesia)
- Orthogonius parcepunctatus Kolbe, 1895 (Tanzania)
- Orthogonius paris Tian & Deuve, 2006 (Thailand)
- Orthogonius parvus Chaudoir, 1872 (India)
- Orthogonius pectinatus Tian & Deuve, 2016 (Thailand and Vietnam)
- Orthogonius perakensis Tian & Deuve, 2006 (Malaysia)
- Orthogonius perakicus Tian & Deuve, 2007 (Malaysia)
- Orthogonius perpuncticollis Burgeon, 1937 (Africa)
- Orthogonius petiolaris Tian & Deuve, 2006 (India)
- Orthogonius piceus Chaudoir, 1872 (Malaysia and Indonesia)
- Orthogonius picilabris (W.S.MacLeay, 1825) (Malaysia, Indonesia, and Borneo)
- Orthogonius picipennis Chaudoir, 1872 (Cambodia and Vietnam)
- Orthogonius pinguis Murray, 1858 (Nigeria)
- Orthogonius pinophilus Tian; Deuve & Felix, 2012 (Thailand)
- Orthogonius planiger (Walker, 1858) (Sri Lanka)
- Orthogonius plebius Tian & Deuve, 2006 (Sri Lanka)
- Orthogonius poggii Tian & Deuve, 2007
- Orthogonius politior Tian & Deuve, 2016 (Laos)
- Orthogonius politus Chaudoir, 1872 (Malaysia, Indonesia, and Borneo)
- Orthogonius pollinctor Basilewsky, 1948 (Democratic Republic of the Congo)
- Orthogonius pradieri Chaudoir, 1872
- Orthogonius pseudochaudoiri Tian; Deuve & Felix, 2012 (Thailand)
- Orthogonius pseudocheni Tian & Deuve, 2006 (Vietnam)
- Orthogonius pseudolongicornis Tian & Deuve, 2006 (Southeast Asia)
- Orthogonius pseudomouhoti Tian & Deuve, 2008 (Cambodia)
- Orthogonius punctatellus Tian & Deuve, 2006 (Indonesia)
- Orthogonius punctulatus Chaudoir, 1872 (India)
- Orthogonius punctum Tian & Deuve, 2016 (Thailand and Vietnam)
- Orthogonius putzeysi Tian & Deuve, 2006 (Sri Lanka)
- Orthogonius quadrisetosus Tian & Deuve, 2006 (Malaysia)
- Orthogonius rhodesianus Csiki, 1932
- Orthogonius rhodesiensis Lorenz, 1998 (Zambia)
- Orthogonius ribbei Tian & Deuve, 2003 (Indonesia)
- Orthogonius rogueti Tian & Deuve, 2016 (India)
- Orthogonius rotundatus Tian & Deuve, 2006
- Orthogonius rufiventris Bates, 1892 (Myanmar)
- Orthogonius rufotestaceus G.Müller, 1941 (Ethiopia)
- Orthogonius sabahensis Tian & Deuve, 2006 (Malaysia, Indonesia, and Borneo)
- Orthogonius sabahicus Tian & Deuve, 2016 (Malaysia, Indonesia, and Borneo)
- Orthogonius salvazai Tian & Deuve, 2006 (Laos)
- Orthogonius sarawakensis Tian & Deuve, 2006 (Malaysia, Indonesia, and Borneo)
- Orthogonius saundersi Andrewes, 1926 (Malaysia and Singapore)
- Orthogonius schaumi Chaudoir, 1872 (Sri Lanka and Indonesia)
- Orthogonius schaumioides Tian & Deuve, 2006 (India)
- Orthogonius schauteni Tian & Deuve, 2006 (Malaysia)
- Orthogonius schmidtgoebeli Chaudoir, 1872 (Myanmar)
- Orthogonius senegalensis Dejean, 1831 (Africa)
- Orthogonius setosopalpiger Tian; Deuve & Felix, 2012 (Thailand)
- Orthogonius siamensis Tian & Deuve, 2006 (Thailand)
- Orthogonius similaris Tian; Deuve & Felix, 2012 (Thailand)
- Orthogonius simplicatus Tian & Deuve, 2006 (Indonesia)
- Orthogonius singaporensis Tian & Deuve, 2006 (Singapore)
- Orthogonius sinuatiphallus Tian & Deuve, 2001 (China)
- Orthogonius smetsi Tian & Deuve, 2006 (Cambodia)
- Orthogonius solidicornis Tian & Deuve, 2003 (China)
- Orthogonius solidus Tian & Deuve, 2006 (India)
- Orthogonius spinosus Burgeon, 1937 (Africa)
- Orthogonius srilankaicus Tian & Deuve, 2003 (Sri Lanka)
- Orthogonius stantoni Tian & Deuve, 2006 (India)
- Orthogonius sterbai Jedlicka, 1935 (Philippines)
- Orthogonius stygius Andrewes, 1930 (Malaysia and Indonesia)
- Orthogonius sulawesicus Tian & Deuve, 2003 (Indonesia)
- Orthogonius sulcatoides Tian & Deuve, 2006 (India, Myanmar, and Malaysia)
- Orthogonius sulcatus Schmidt-Goebel, 1846 (Myanmar and Cambodia)
- Orthogonius sumatraicus Tian & Deuve, 2006 (Indonesia)
- Orthogonius suturalis Chaudoir, 1872 (Malaysia, Indonesia, and Borneo)
- Orthogonius taghavianae Tian; Deuve & Felix, 2012 (Thailand)
- Orthogonius taiwanicus Tian & Deuve, 2006 (Taiwan)
- Orthogonius tangsen Tian & Deuve, 2006 (India)
- Orthogonius tenasserimensis Tian & Deuve, 2006 (Myanmar)
- Orthogonius termiticola Wasmann, 1902 (Malaysia)
- Orthogonius thaicus Tian & Deuve, 2003 (Thailand)
- Orthogonius thaiensis Tian & Deuve, 2006 (Thailand)
- Orthogonius thailandensis Tian & Deuve, 2006 (Thailand)
- Orthogonius thoracicus Gestro, 1875
- Orthogonius tikekee Tian & Deuve, 2006 (Myanmar)
- Orthogonius tonkinensis Tian & Deuve, 2006 (Vietnam)
- Orthogonius tonkinicus Tian & Deuve, 2006 (Vietnam)
- Orthogonius travancore Tian & Deuve, 2006 (India)
- Orthogonius tricarinatus Burgeon, 1937 (Africa)
- Orthogonius uncipennis Tian & Deuve, 2006 (Nepal)
- Orthogonius vari Tian; Deuve & Felix, 2012 (Thailand and Cambodia)
- Orthogonius variabilis Tian; Deuve & Felix, 2012 (China and Thailand)
- Orthogonius virgulatus Andrewes, 1931 (Indonesia and Borneo)
- Orthogonius wallardiensis Tian & Deuve, 2006 (India)
- Orthogonius wrasei Tian & Deuve, 2016 (Myanmar)
- Orthogonius xanthomerus L.Redtenbacher, 1868 (China)
- Orthogonius yoga Tian & Deuve, 2006 (India)
- Orthogonius yunnanensis Tian & Deuve, 2001 (China)
