= Nepalorthogonius =

Nepalorthogonius monilicornis

Scientific classification
- Kingdom: Animalia
- Phylum: Arthropoda
- Class: Insecta
- Order: Coleoptera
- Suborder: Adephaga
- Family: Carabidae
- Subfamily: Orthogoniinae
- Genus: Nepalorthogonius; Habu, 1979
- Species: N. monilicornis

Binomial name
- Nepalorthogonius monilicornis Habu, 1979

Genus of beetles

Nepalorthogonius monilicornis is a species of beetles in the family Carabidae, the only species in the genus Nepalorthogonius.
