= Perochnoristhus =

Scientific classification
- Domain: Eukaryota
- Kingdom: Animalia
- Phylum: Arthropoda
- Class: Insecta
- Order: Coleoptera
- Suborder: Adephaga
- Family: Carabidae
- Tribe: Idiomorphini
- Subtribe: Perochnoristhina
- Genus: Perochnoristhus; Basilewsky, 1973
- Species: P. penrithae

Binomial name
- Perochnoristhus penrithae Basilewsky, 1973

Genus of beetles

Perochnoristhus is a genus in the ground beetle family Carabidae. This genus has a single species, Perochnoristhus penrithae. It is found in Namibia.
