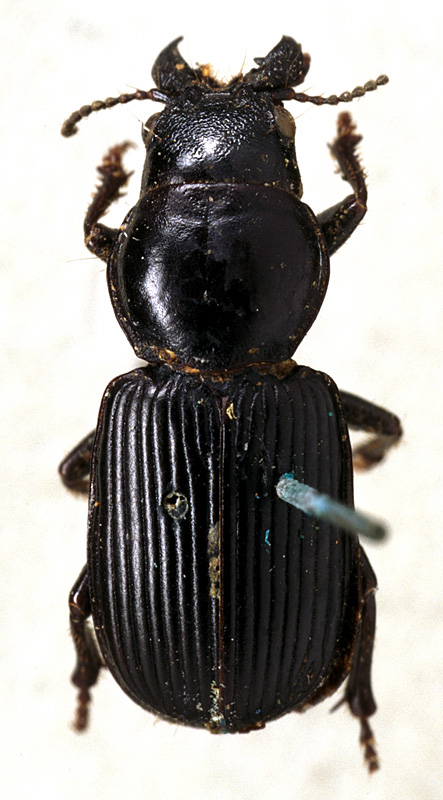
- Idiomorphus guerini

Scientific classification
- Kingdom: Animalia
- Phylum: Arthropoda
- Clade: Pancrustacea
- Class: Insecta
- Order: Coleoptera
- Suborder: Adephaga
- Family: Carabidae
- Subfamily: Orthogoniinae; Schaum, 1857

= Orthogoniinae =

Subfamily of beetles

Orthogoniinae is a subfamily of ground beetles (family Carabidae). Occasionally it was treated as a tribe Orthogoniini of subfamily Harpalinae, particularly when this was circumscribed loosely.

It contains the following genera:

Tribe Amorphomerini Sloane, 1923
Amorphomerus Sloane, 1923
Tribe Idiomorphini Bates, 1891
Idiomorphus Chaudoir, 1846
Rathymus Dejean, 1831
Strigia Brullé, 1835
Perochnoristhus Basilewsky, 1973
Tribe Orthogoniini Schaum, 1857
Glyptus Brullé, 1837
Neoglyptus Basilewsky, 1953
Actenoncus Chaudoir, 1872
Anoncopeucus Chaudoir, 1872
Hexachaetus Chaudoir, 1872
Neoorthogonius Tian & Deuve, 2006
Nepalorthogonius Habu, 1979
Orthogonius W.S.MacLeay, 1825
