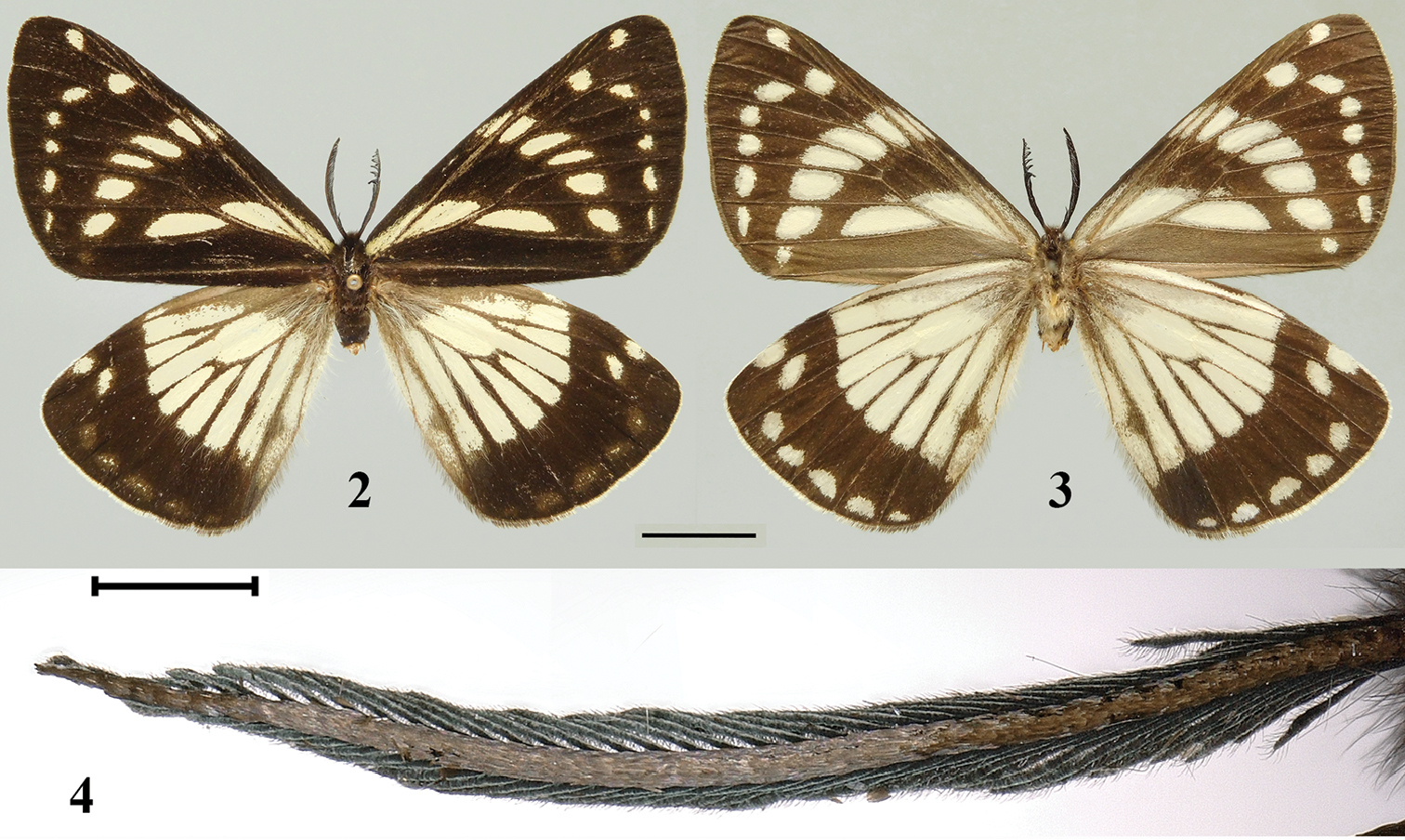
- Mimaporia owadai
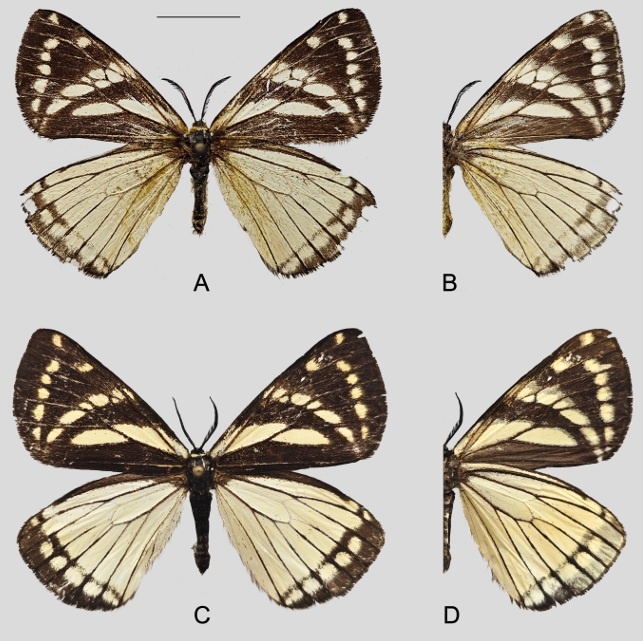
- Mimaporia pura

Scientific classification
- Kingdom: Animalia
- Phylum: Arthropoda
- Class: Insecta
- Order: Lepidoptera
- Family: Epicopeiidae
- Genus: Mimaporia; Wei & Yen, 2017

Type species
- Mimaporia hmong Wei & Yen, 2017

Species
- See text

= Mimaporia =

Genus of moth

Mimaporia is a genus of moths in the Oriental swallowtail moth family Epicopeiidae consisting of two species, Mimaporia hmong and Mimaporia owadai. First described in 2017 by Shen-Horn Yen and Chia-Hsuan Wei, as the sole species Mimaporia hmong, from museum specimens held at the Natural History Museum, London. The second species, Mimaporia owadai was discovered two years after the initial description. Its members are found in Northern Vietnam, Northern India, and Sichuan Province in China.

Named due to their resemblance to Aporia butterflies, this genus of moths engage in various mimetic relationships with other lepidopterans. This includes members of the butterfly genus Neptis in addition to the aforementioned Aporia. Recent genetic studies put Mimaporia as a sister group to Nossa and Epicopeia.

== Description ==
Mimaporia is a genus of Epicopeiid moths, known for engaging in mimicry complexes with other lepidopterans. Mimaporia is no exception, in this case, the moth mimics members of the families Nymphalidae and Pieridae. With M. hmong known for engaging in a mimetic relationship with Aporia agathon. Whereas M. owadai is known for its mimetic relationship with members of the genus Neptis, including Neptis alwina, Neptis dejeani, and Neptis philyroides, with similar flight and wing patterns. The distribution of M. owadai overlaps with that of N. alwina and N. dejeani, while the Northern Vietnamese distribution of M. hmong overlapping with N. philyroides and thus making it a contender for its mimetic relationship.

The genus is characterized by their lack of chaetosemata, which are sensory structures. Additionally wing venation, in the closeness of forewing vein M2 and M3 compared to the closeness of M2 with the stem of vein R5 and M1. The aedeagus of Mimaporia has a sclerotized shaft. In addition, similar to the genera Nossa and Epicopeia, of whom it has a sister-group relationship with, the aedeagus coecum is reduced or even absent.

== Etymology ==
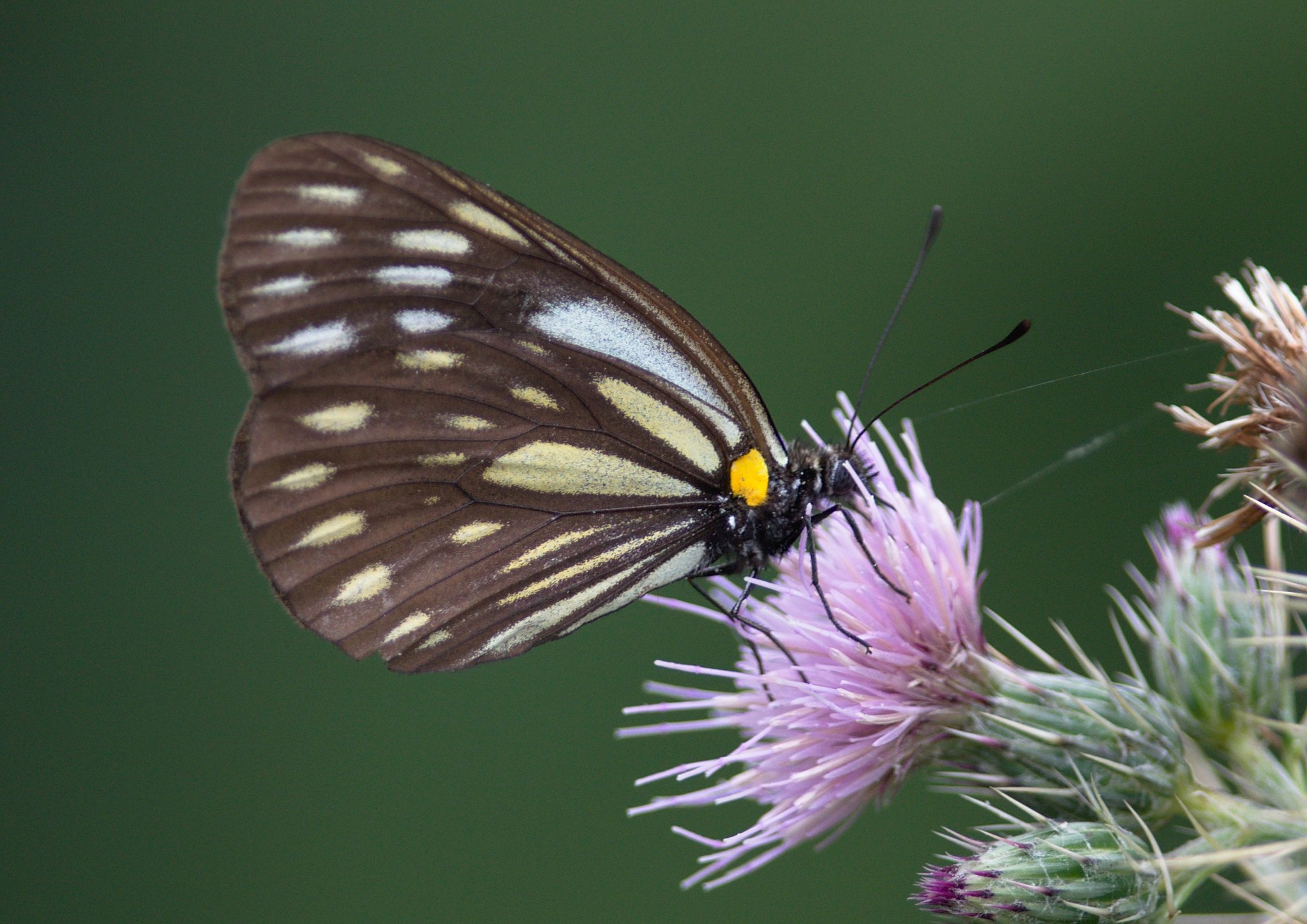
Mimaporia was named as the moth resembled Aporia butterflies.

The genus was named after the butterfly genus Aporia, and the possible co-mimicry relationship that the two genera share. It was thought that the first species discovered, Mimaporia hmong, occurred sympatrically with the butterfly Aporia agathon. Their external appearance, consisting of orange and yellow tegulae, and light colored dotted and striped wings, resemble each other.

== Species ==
Mimaporia consists of 3 species, with the newest being discovered in 2024.

- Mimaporia hmong Wei & Yen, 2017
- Mimaporia owadai Huang & Wang, 2019
- Mimaporia pura Yu & Jiang in Yu, Jiang, Xiong, Pan & Hu, 2024

== Taxonomy ==
Mimaporia was described from a group of museum specimens of previously-unknown Epicopeiid moths held at the Natural History Museum, London, which first came into attention in 2002. No taxonomic change was made, due to the scarcity of genetic available to researchers until specimens of Mimaporia hmong were sent in from Vietnam. Both M. hmong and M. owadai were known after the 2002 rediscovery, but only M. hmong was described from the specimens by Wei and Yen. M. owadai, which was physically discovered 2 years later, and then retroactively identified as the specimens held in the Natural History Museum, London that were referred to in Wei and Yen's original paper.

Through morphological evidence, it suggests a potential relationship for the Epicopeiid genus Burmeia. However, for the purposes of Wei and Yen's initial description, due to the rarity of Burmeia specimens, it was neglected for genetic sampling. Phylogenetic analysis suggests a sister group relationship between Mimaporia and the genera Chatamla or Parabraxas. Despite this close relationship, Mimaporia resembles the genus Nossa rather than its sister taxa in appearance. Later research by Zhang et al. in 2020 suggests a different relationship from that interpreted by Wei and Yen, between Mimaporia and Epicopeia and Nossa, which is detailed in the second cladogram below. This research was further corroborated upon by a separate study in 2021 by Call et al..

The following phylogenetic tree is derived from Wei and Yen's research, with the left figure representing Bayesian analysis, suggesting a sister relationship with Parabraxas, whereas the right figure representing maximum likelihood analysis, and suggesting that Mimaporia is sister to Parabraxas:

- - - Pseudobiston pinratanai (Pseudobistonidae)
    - Amana angulifera
    - - - Nossa moorei
        - - Epicopeia battaka
          - - Epicopeia polydora
            - - Epicopeia polydora
              - Epicopeia polydora
      - - - - Epicopeia mencia
            - Epicopeia mencia
          - - Psychostrophia nymphidiaria
            - Psychostrophia picaria
        - - - Schistomitra funeralis
            - - Chatamla flavescens
              - - Mimaporia hmong
                - Parabraxas nigromacularia
          - - - Epicopeia hainesii sinicaria
              - Epicopeia hainesii matsumurai
            - - Nossa nelcinna
              - Nossa palaearctica

- - - Pseudobiston pinratanai (Pseudobistonidae)
    - - Amana angulifera
      - - - Nossa moorei
          - - Epicopeia battaka
            - - Epicopeia polydora
              - - Epicopeia polydora
                - Epicopeia polydora
        - - - Epicopeia mencia
            - Epicopeia mencia
          - - - - Parabraxas nigromacularia
                - - Psychostrophia nymphidiaria
                  - Psychostrophia picaria
            - - - Schistomitra funeralis
                - - Chatamla flavescens
                  - - Mimaporia hmong
              - - - Epicopeia hainesii sinicaria
                  - Epicopeia hainesii matsumurai
                - - Nossa nelcinna
                  - Nossa palaearctica

A 2020 study focusing on the genetic relationships of the Epicopeiid moths by Zhang et al. focusing on their mimetic relationships moved Mimaporia outside of the currently understood arrangement. The genetic material of Mimaporia owadaiwas used for its purposes, and found a sister relationship between it and the Epicopeia and Nossa group, disputing the findings of Wei and Yen in 2017. This was further supported by morphological similarities in the genitalia of the 3 genera, which had similarities in the aedeagus coecum. The study yielded the following phylogenetic tree, which is reproduced as follows: These findings were further supported by Call et al. (2021), using targeted enrichment (TE) approach of Next Generation Sequencing (NGS) which yielded results that were entirely in agreement with Zhang et al.'s work.

- - - - Pseudobiston
      - - Deuveia
        - - - Burmeia
            - Psychostrophia
          - - Amana
            - - - Schistomitra
                - - Chatamla
                  - Parabraxas
              - - Mimaporia
                - - - - Epicopeia I
                      - - Nossa I
                        - Epicopeia II
                    - - Epicopeia III
                      - Nossa II

== Distribution ==
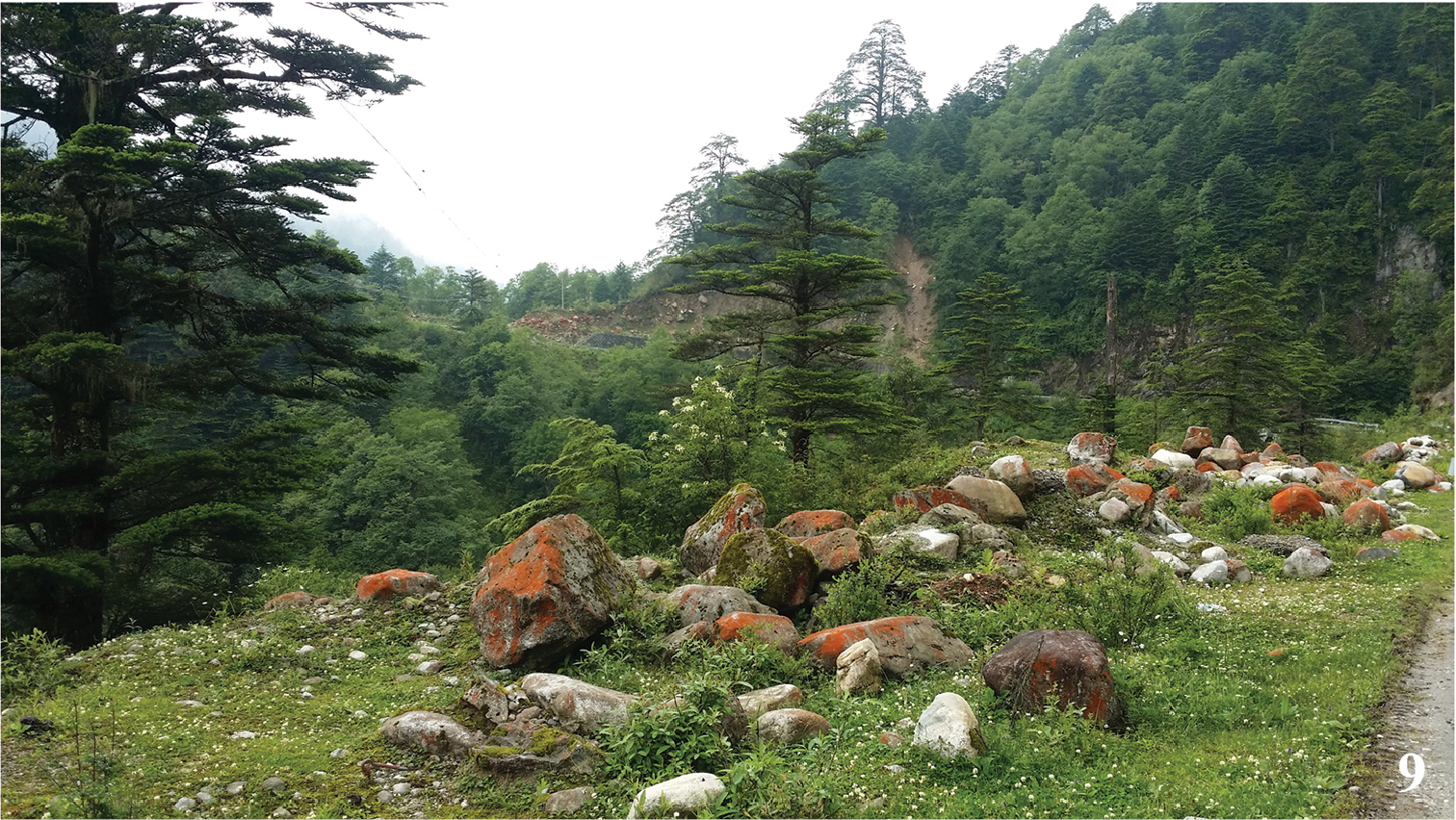
Habitat of Mimaporia owadai in Sichuan Province, China.

Mimaporia hmong was described from specimens found in Vietnam, with the type locality being Lào Cai. The specific name refers to the Hmong people of Sa Pa, Vietnam.

Mimaporia owadai was first collected from a specimen in Moxi Town, Sichuan in China. Additional specimens housed in the Natural History Museum, London, were retroactively identified as M. owadai due to similarities in external characteristics. These additional specimens had their localities listed as being from Northern India and Wolong, Sichuan. It is additionally known to occur in Luding County in Sichuan.
