= Epicopiopsis =

Scientific classification
- Kingdom: Animalia
- Phylum: Arthropoda
- Class: Insecta
- Order: Lepidoptera
- Family: Epicopeiidae
- Genus: Epicopiopsis; Grünberg, 1908

Genus of moths

Epicopiopsis is a genus of moths in the family Epicopeiidae described by Karl Grünberg in 1908. The Global Lepidoptera Names Index has this genus as a synonym of Epicopeia.

== Species ==
- Epicopiopsis albofasciata Djakonov, 1926
- Epicopiopsis battaka Dohrn, 1895
- Epicopiopsis caroli Janet, 1909
- Epicopiopsis hainesii Holland, 1889
- Epicopiopsis leucomelaena Oberthür, 1919
- Epicopiopsis longicauda Matsumura, 1931
- Epicopiopsis mencia Moore, 1874
- Epicopiopsis polydora Westwood, 1841
- Epicopiopsis philenora Westwood, 1841
