= Nossa alpherakii =

Scientific classification
- Domain: Eukaryota
- Kingdom: Animalia
- Phylum: Arthropoda
- Class: Insecta
- Order: Lepidoptera
- Family: Epicopeiidae
- Genus: Nossa
- Species: N. alpherakii

Binomial name
- Nossa alpherakii (Herz, 1904)

Synonyms
- Atossa alpherakii Herz, 1904

Species of moth

Nossa alpherakii is a moth in the family Epicopeiidae first described by Alfred Otto Herz in 1904. It is found in North Korea.
