= Parabraxas flavomarginaria =

Scientific classification
- Domain: Eukaryota
- Kingdom: Animalia
- Phylum: Arthropoda
- Class: Insecta
- Order: Lepidoptera
- Family: Epicopeiidae
- Genus: Parabraxas
- Species: P. flavomarginaria

Binomial name
- Parabraxas flavomarginaria (Leech, 1897)

Synonyms
- Oberthüria flavomarginaria Leech, 1897

Species of moth

Parabraxas flavomarginaria is a moth in the family Epicopeiidae. It was described by John Henry Leech in 1897. It is found in western China.

The wingspan is 50–58 mm. Adults are similar to Parabraxas davidi, but have much broader and richer yellow border to all wings. These borders are transversed by a series of black spots and are inwardly limited by narrower black bands. The costal area is more deeply yellow and more finely speckled with black. There is no black transverse bar at the end of the discal cell on the hindwings and the abdominal margin is not suffused with blackish.
