= Amana (moth) =

Scientific classification
- Kingdom: Animalia
- Phylum: Arthropoda
- Class: Insecta
- Order: Lepidoptera
- Family: Epicopeiidae
- Genus: Amana; Walker, 1855

Genus of moths

Amana is a genus of moths in the family Epicopeiidae.

== Species ==
- Amana angulifera Walker, 1855

== Former species ==
- Amana banghaasi Hering, 1932
