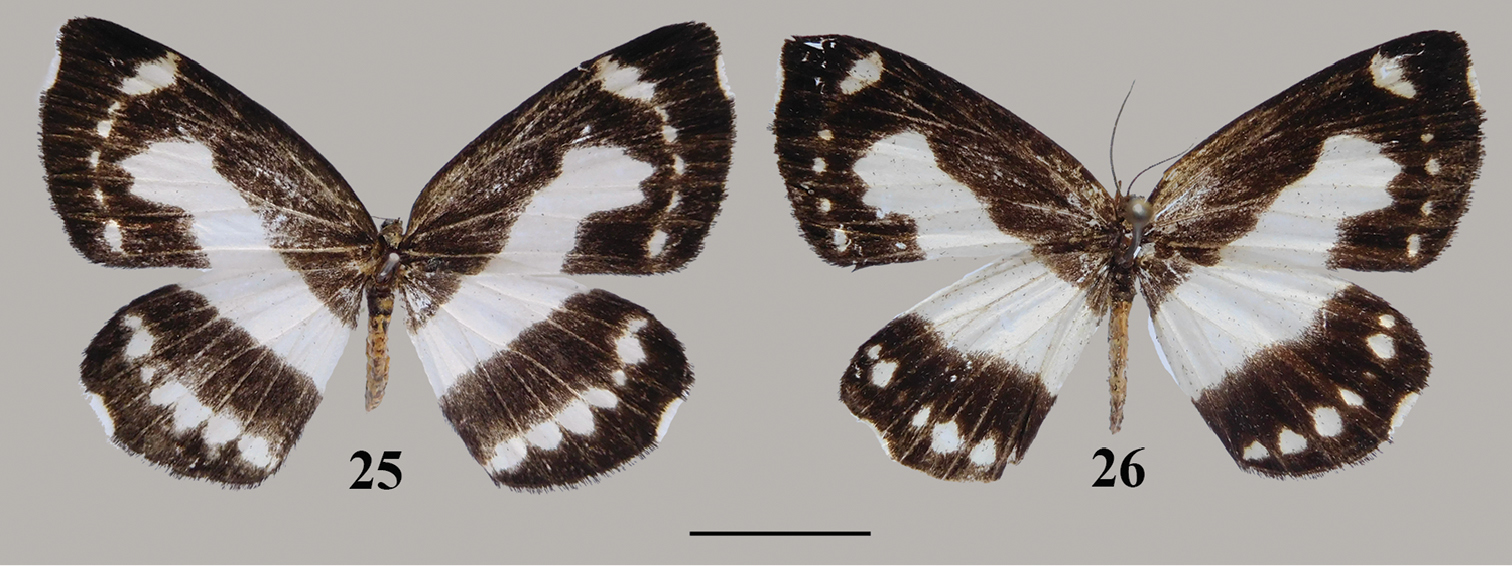

Scientific classification
- Kingdom: Animalia
- Phylum: Arthropoda
- Class: Insecta
- Order: Lepidoptera
- Family: Epicopeiidae
- Genus: Psychostrophia
- Species: P. endoi

Binomial name
- Psychostrophia endoi Inoue, 1992

= Psychostrophia endoi =

Species of moth

Psychostrophia endoi is a moth in the family Epicopeiidae. It was described by Hiroshi Inoue in 1992. It is found in Laos.

The length of the forewings is about 16 mm.
