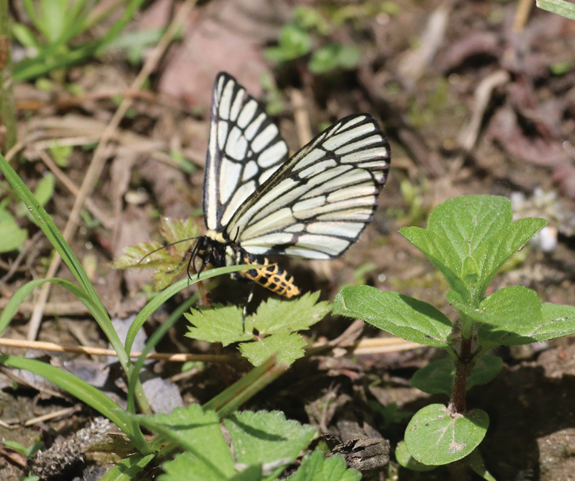

Scientific classification
- Domain: Eukaryota
- Kingdom: Animalia
- Phylum: Arthropoda
- Class: Insecta
- Order: Lepidoptera
- Family: Epicopeiidae
- Genus: Schistomitra
- Species: S. joelmineti

Binomial name
- Schistomitra joelmineti Huang & Wang, 2019

= Schistomitra joelmineti =

Genus of moths

Schistomitra joelmineti is a moth species in the family Epicopeiidae described by Si-Yao Huang and Yuan Zhang in 2019. The specific epithet is named in honor of Joël Minet

It is found in Northwest China, where it has been found in Shaanxi Province and Gansu Province as of 2019. Length of forewing is 27–30 mm. Adults are on wing from late April to June. The host plant of larva is unknown at present.
