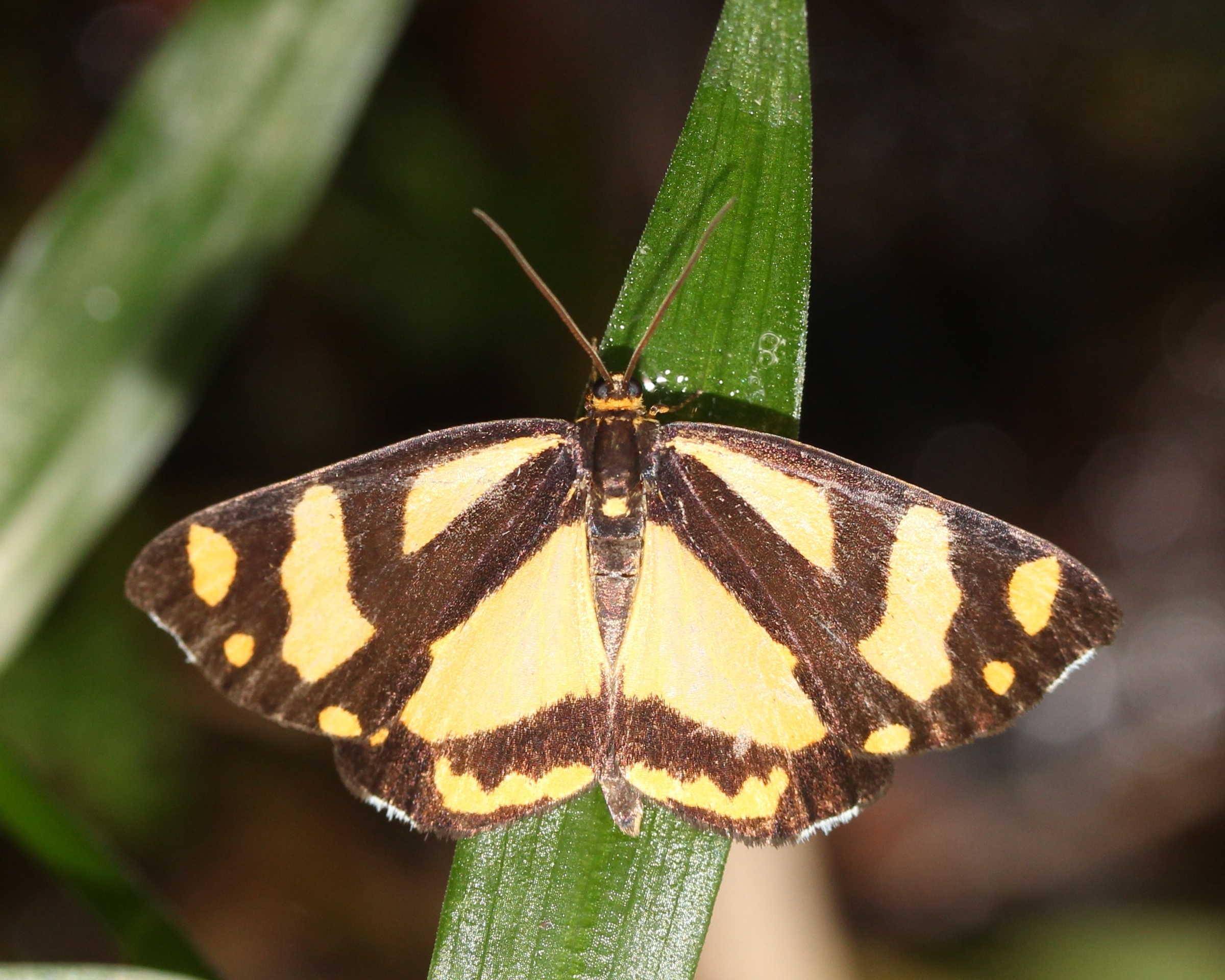
- Psychostrophia melanargia on a leaf

Scientific classification
- Kingdom: Animalia
- Phylum: Arthropoda
- Class: Insecta
- Order: Lepidoptera
- Family: Epicopeiidae
- Genus: Psychostrophia
- Species: P. melanargia

Binomial name
- Psychostrophia melanargia Butler, 1877
- Range of P. melanargia

Synonyms
- Psychostrophia catenifera Seitz, 1912; Psychostrophia hemimelaena Seitz, 1913

= Psychostrophia melanargia =

Species of moth

Psychostrophia melanargia, commonly known as golden-crested moth, is a moth of the family Epicopeiidae first described by Arthur Gardiner Butler in 1877. It is found in Japan.

The wingspan is 32–39 mm.

== Host plants ==
The host plant is the Japanese clethra Huang, S. Y.; Wang, M.; Fan, X. L. (2019). "Notes on the genus Psychostrophia Butler, 1877 (Lepidoptera, Epicopeiidae), with description of a new species". ZooKeys (900): 111–127. Bibcode:2019ZooK..900..111H. doi:10.3897/zookeys.900.46973. PMC 6946741. PMID 31920426.
