= Nossa nagaensis =

Scientific classification
- Domain: Eukaryota
- Kingdom: Animalia
- Phylum: Arthropoda
- Class: Insecta
- Order: Lepidoptera
- Family: Epicopeiidae
- Genus: Nossa
- Species: N. nagaensis

Binomial name
- Nossa nagaensis (Elwes, 1890)

Synonyms
- Atossa nagaensis Elwes, 1890

Species of moth

Nossa nagaensis is a moth in the family Epicopeiidae first described by Henry John Elwes in 1890. It is found in the Indian state of Assam.
