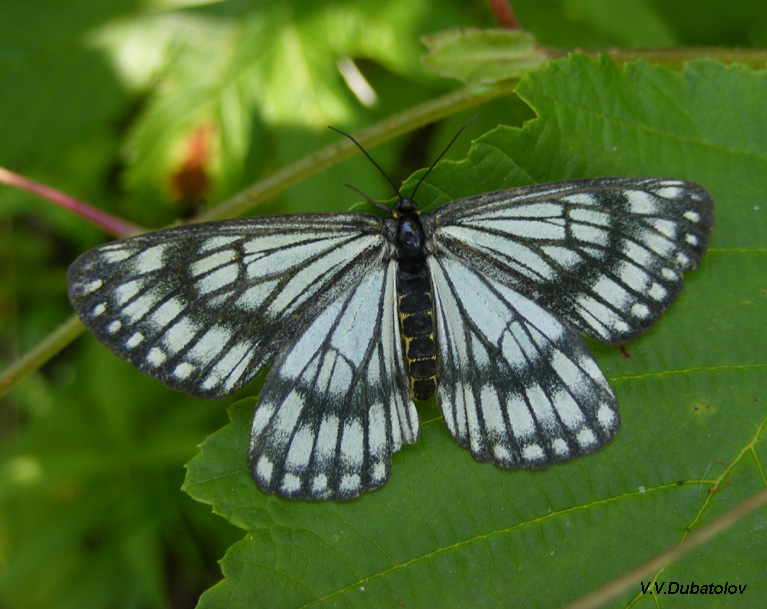
- Female from Russia

Scientific classification
- Domain: Eukaryota
- Kingdom: Animalia
- Phylum: Arthropoda
- Class: Insecta
- Order: Lepidoptera
- Family: Epicopeiidae
- Genus: Nossa
- Species: N. palaearctica

Binomial name
- Nossa palaearctica (Staudinger, 1887)

Synonyms
- Chalcosia palaearctica Staudinger, 1887

= Nossa palaearctica =

Species of moth

Nossa palaearctica is a moth in the family Epicopeiidae first described by Staudinger in 1887. It is found in the Russian Far East and China. The Global Lepidoptera Names Index gives this name as a synonym of Nossa nelcinna.
