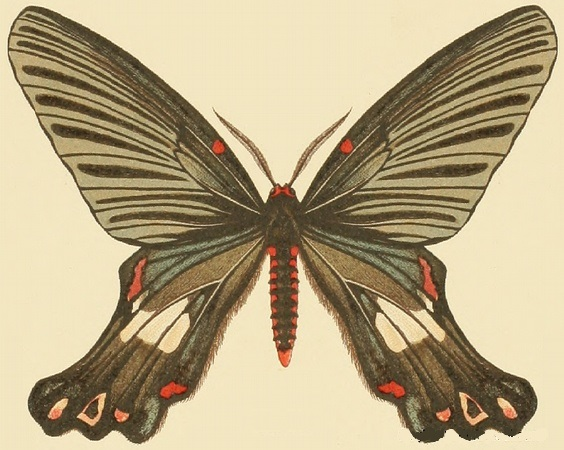

Scientific classification
- Domain: Eukaryota
- Kingdom: Animalia
- Phylum: Arthropoda
- Class: Insecta
- Order: Lepidoptera
- Family: Epicopeiidae
- Genus: Epicopeia
- Species: E. caroli

Binomial name
- Epicopeia caroli Janet, 1909

= Epicopeia caroli =

Species of moth

Epicopeia caroli is a moth in the family Epicopeiidae. It was described by Janet in 1909. It is found in China.

== Subspecies ==
- Epicopeia caroli caroli
- Epicopeia caroli fukienensis Chu & Wang 1981
- Epicopeia caroli tienmuensis Chu & Wang, 1981
