= Psychostrophia picaria =

Scientific classification
- Domain: Eukaryota
- Kingdom: Animalia
- Phylum: Arthropoda
- Class: Insecta
- Order: Lepidoptera
- Family: Epicopeiidae
- Genus: Psychostrophia
- Species: P. picaria

Binomial name
- Psychostrophia picaria Leech, 1897

Synonyms
- Psychostrophia albomaculata Wileman

Species of moth

Psychostrophia picaria is a moth in the family Epicopeiidae. It was described by John Henry Leech in 1897. It is found in China.
