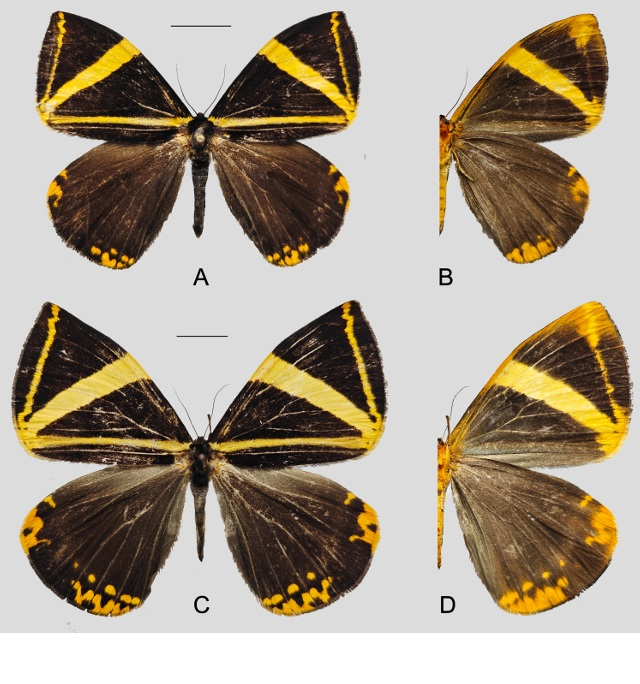
- A, B: male; C, D: female

Scientific classification
- Kingdom: Animalia
- Phylum: Arthropoda
- Class: Insecta
- Order: Lepidoptera
- Family: Epicopeiidae
- Genus: Amana
- Species: A. angulifera

Binomial name
- Amana angulifera Walker, 1855

= Amana angulifera =

Species of moth

Amana angulifera is a moth in the family Epicopeiidae. It was described by Francis Walker in 1855. It is found in India.
