= Hoyerswerda riots =

Series of xenophobic riots in Saxony, Germany in September 1991

The Hoyerswerda riots (German: Unruhen in Hoyerswerda) were xenophobic riots that lasted from 17 to 23 September 1991 in Hoyerswerda, a town in the north-east of Saxony, Germany.

The riots started with a group of mainly young neo-Nazis attacking Vietnamese street hawkers. After the intervention of the police, a hostel used mainly by Mozambican contract workers came under attack. In the following night, further riots took place in Hoyerswerda and foreigners were hurt. On the fourth night, stones and petrol bombs were thrown at an apartment block in Thomas-Müntzer-Straße that housed asylum seekers. During the clashes, 32 people were hurt and 83 were arrested.

After the incidents, the Saxony government evacuated the asylum seekers from Thomas-Müntzer-Straße and many contract workers left the town. In 1991, the word ausländerfrei (free of foreigners) became a synonym for the riot and the 'un-word of the year' in Germany 1991.

The city made efforts to polish its public image and to take action against right-wing radicals. Although the presence of right-wing radicals in the city is less visible, it is still a centre of right-wing extremism. In 2006, the Jungen Nationaldemokraten, the youth organisation of the far-right National Democratic Party of Germany, organised a demonstration to remember the 1991 riots. The police arrested over 50 counter-demonstrators and the demonstration took place.

== See also ==
- Riot of Rostock-Lichtenhagen
- Solingen arson attack of 1993
