= Parabraxas nigromacularia =

Scientific classification
- Domain: Eukaryota
- Kingdom: Animalia
- Phylum: Arthropoda
- Class: Insecta
- Order: Lepidoptera
- Family: Epicopeiidae
- Genus: Parabraxas
- Species: P. nigromacularia

Binomial name
- Parabraxas nigromacularia (Leech, 1897)

Synonyms
- Oberthuria nigromacularia Leech, 1897; Methystria nigromacularia ab. nigrofasciaria Bytinski-Salz, 1939

Species of moth

Parabraxas nigromacularia is a moth in the family Epicopeiidae. It was described by John Henry Leech in 1897. It is found in central China.

The wingspan is about 50 mm. Adults are white, with the costa and outer margin of the forewings broadly yellow, the former dotted with black, the latter transversed by two series of black spots and bordered inwardly by a third series. There is an interrupted central band and a series of five black spots from this to the inner margin. The extreme base of the hindwings is black and there are a number of large black spots.
