= Nossa moorei =

Scientific classification
- Kingdom: Animalia
- Phylum: Arthropoda
- Class: Insecta
- Order: Lepidoptera
- Family: Epicopeiidae
- Genus: Nossa
- Species: N. moorei

Binomial name
- Nossa moorei (Elwes, 1890)

Synonyms
- Atossa moorei Elwes, 1890

Species of moth

Nossa moorei is a moth in the family Epicopeiidae first described by Henry John Elwes in 1890. It is found in the Indian state of Assam, Bhutan, and China.
