= Marcel Rozgonyi =

German footballer

Personal information
- Date of birth: 28 January 1976 (age 50)
- Place of birth: Hoyerswerda, East Germany
- Height: 1.85 m (6 ft 1 in)
- Position: Defender

Youth career
- FC Energie Cottbus

Senior career*
Years	Team	Apps	(Gls)
1995–2000	FSV Hoyerswerda		
2000–2001	1. FC Magdeburg		
2001–2002	FC Schalke 04	0	(0)
2002–2003	FC Energie Cottbus	16	(0)
2004–2006	1. FC Saarbrücken	57	(2)
2006–2008	FC Sachsen Leipzig	47	(0)
2008–2010	1. FC Saarbrücken	17	(1)
- * Club domestic league appearances and goals

Marcel Rozgonyi (born 28 January 1976 in Hoyerswerda) is a German former football player. He also holds Hungarian citizenship. He made his debut on the professional league level in the Bundesliga for FC Energie Cottbus on 17 August 2002 when he came on as a half-time substitute in the game against VfL Bochum.

== Honours ==
- DFB-Pokal: 2001–02
