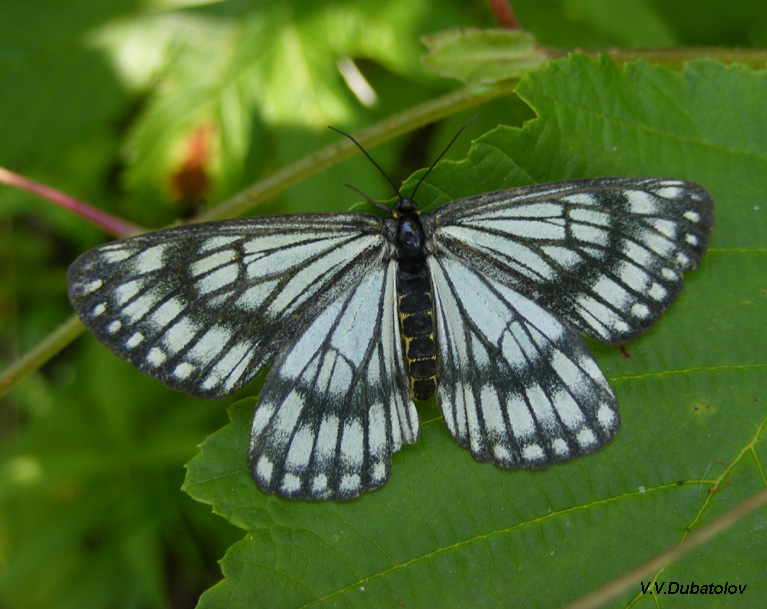
- Nossa palaearctica Female

Scientific classification
- Domain: Eukaryota
- Kingdom: Animalia
- Phylum: Arthropoda
- Class: Insecta
- Order: Lepidoptera
- Family: Epicopeiidae
- Genus: Nossa; Kirby, 1892

Synonyms
- Atossa Moore, [1875] (preocc. Thomson, 1864)

= Nossa =

Genus of moths

Nossa is a genus of moths in the family Epicopeiidae. The genus was described by William Forsell Kirby in 1892.

== Species ==
- Nossa alpherakii (Herz, 1904)
- Nossa moorei (Elwes, 1890)
- Nossa nagaensis (Elwes, 1890)
- Nossa nelcinna (Moore, [1875])
- Nossa palaearctica (Staudinger, 1887)

== Former species ==
- Nossa chinensis
- Nossa leechii
