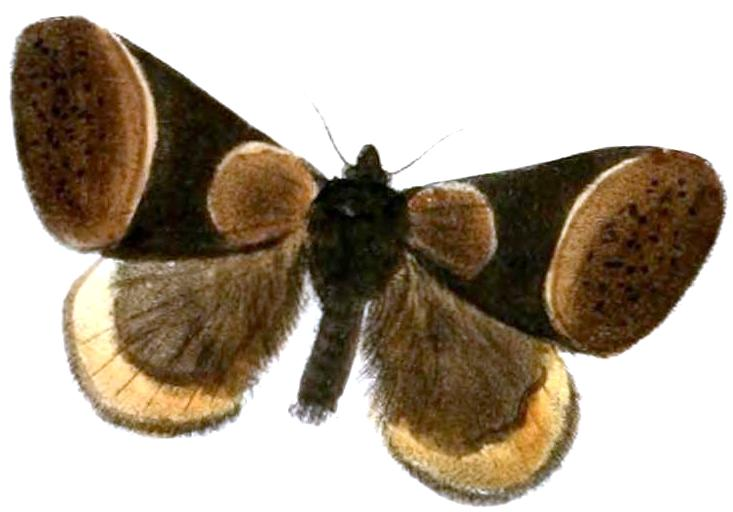
- Heracula discivitta

Scientific classification
- Kingdom: Animalia
- Phylum: Arthropoda
- Clade: Pancrustacea
- Class: Insecta
- Order: Lepidoptera
- Superfamily: Geometroidea
- Family: Pseudobistonidae; Minet, Rajaei & Stüning, 2015

Subfamilies
- Pseudobistoninae; Heraculinae

= Pseudobistonidae =

Family of moths

Pseudobistonidae is a family of Asian moths in the superfamily Geometroidea. It was erected in 2015 and contained Pseudobiston pinratanai as its only species. A second species was moved into this family in 2019: Heracula discivitta, in a new subfamily called Heraculinae.

== Subfamilies and genera ==
- Subfamily Pseudobistoninae Minet, Rajaei & Stüning, 2015
  - Genus Pseudobiston Inoue, 1994
- Subfamily Heraculinae Wang & Holloway, 2019
  - Genus Heracula Moore, [1866]
