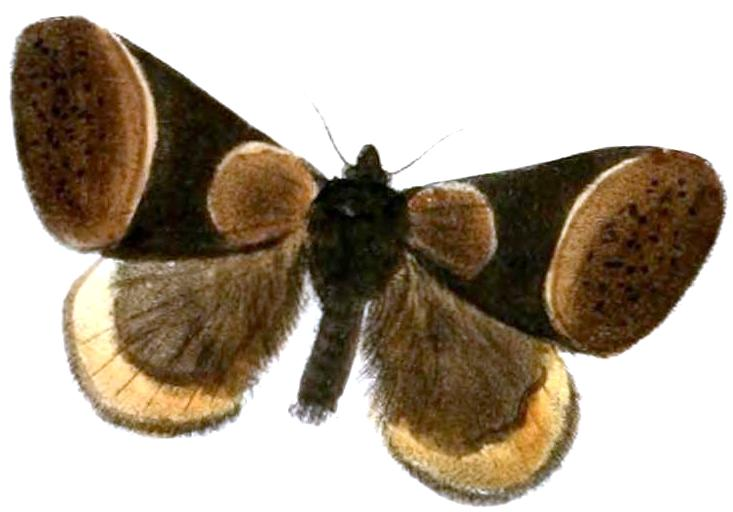

Scientific classification
- Kingdom: Animalia
- Phylum: Arthropoda
- Clade: Pancrustacea
- Class: Insecta
- Order: Lepidoptera
- Family: Pseudobistonidae
- Subfamily: Heraculinae; Wang & Holloway, 2019
- Genus: Heracula; Moore, [1866]
- Species: H. discivitta

Binomial name
- Heracula discivitta Moore, [1866]

= Heracula =

Genus of moths

Heracula is a genus of moths in the family Pseudobistonidae. It contains only one species, Heracula discivitta, which is found in India (Sikkim) and Nepal.

It used to be classified in the subfamily Lymantriinae of the family Erebidae until 2019, when it was moved to the recently created family Pseudobistonidae, in a newly created subfamily called Heraculinae.
