= Epicopeia leucomelaena =

Scientific classification
- Domain: Eukaryota
- Kingdom: Animalia
- Phylum: Arthropoda
- Class: Insecta
- Order: Lepidoptera
- Family: Epicopeiidae
- Genus: Epicopeia
- Species: E. leucomelaena

Binomial name
- Epicopeia leucomelaena Oberthür, 1919

Species of moth

Epicopeia leucomelaena is a moth in the family Epicopeiidae. It was described by Oberthür in 1919. It is found in China.
