= Epicopeia philenora =

Scientific classification
- Kingdom: Animalia
- Phylum: Arthropoda
- Class: Insecta
- Order: Lepidoptera
- Family: Epicopeiidae
- Genus: Epicopeia
- Species: E. philenora

Binomial name
- Epicopeia philenora Westwood, 1841

Synonyms
- Epicopeia varunaea Moore, 1865

Species of moth

Epicopeia philenora is a moth in the family Epicopeiidae. It was described by John O. Westwood in 1841. It is found in India.
