= Psychostrophia nymphidiaria =

Scientific classification
- Domain: Eukaryota
- Kingdom: Animalia
- Phylum: Arthropoda
- Class: Insecta
- Order: Lepidoptera
- Family: Epicopeiidae
- Genus: Psychostrophia
- Species: P. nymphidiaria

Binomial name
- Psychostrophia nymphidiaria (Oberthür, 1893)

Synonyms
- Abraxas nymphidiaria Oberthür, 1893

Species of moth

Psychostrophia nymphidiaria is a moth in the family Epicopeiidae. It was described by Oberthür in 1893. It is found in western China.
