= Parabraxas davidi =

Scientific classification
- Kingdom: Animalia
- Phylum: Arthropoda
- Clade: Pancrustacea
- Class: Insecta
- Order: Lepidoptera
- Family: Epicopeiidae
- Genus: Parabraxas
- Species: P. davidi

Binomial name
- Parabraxas davidi (Oberthür, 1886)

Synonyms
- Abraxas davidi Oberthür, 1886; Parabraxas davidi erebina Oberthür, 1911

Species of moth

Parabraxas davidi is a moth in the family Epicopeiidae. It was described by Oberthür in 1885. It is found in western China and Tibet.
