= Schistomitra funeralis =

Scientific classification
- Kingdom: Animalia
- Phylum: Arthropoda
- Clade: Pancrustacea
- Class: Insecta
- Order: Lepidoptera
- Family: Epicopeiidae
- Genus: Schistomitra
- Species: S. funeralis

Binomial name
- Schistomitra funeralis Butler, 1881

Genus of moths

Schistomitra funeralis is a moth species in the family Epicopeiidae described by Arthur Gardiner Butler in 1881. It is found in Japan, where it has been recorded from Honshu, Shikoku and kyushu.

The wingspan is 46–53 mm. Adults are on wing from May to June.

The larvae feed on Stewartia pseudocamellia.
