= Hoyerswerda =

Town in Saxony, Germany

Hoyerswerda Wojerecy
- Town
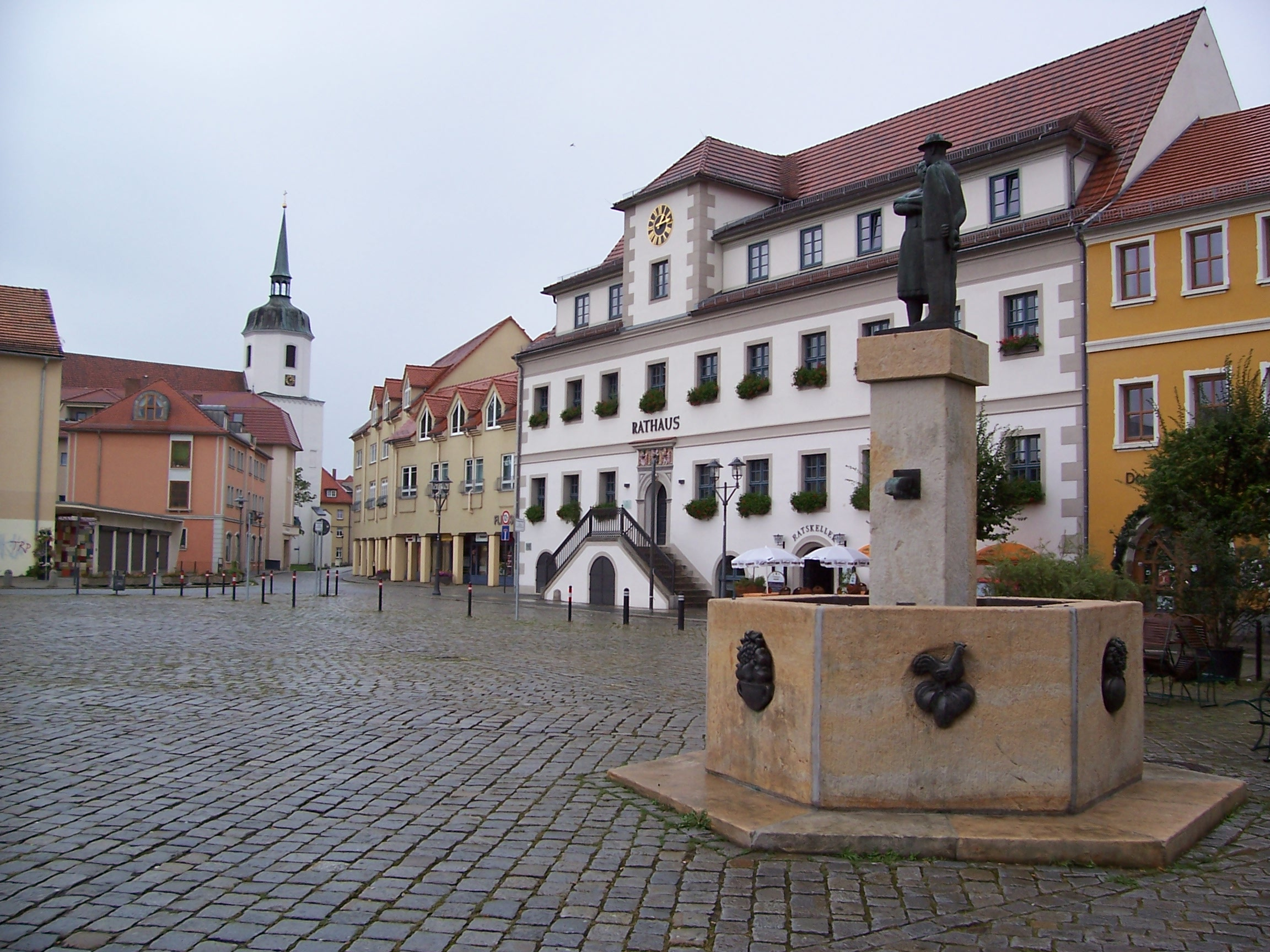
- View of the Old Town's Market Square

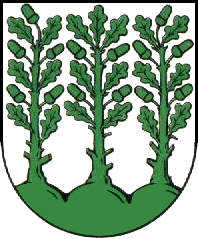
- Coat of arms

- Location of Hoyerswerda; Wojerecy within Bautzen district
- Interactive map of Hoyerswerda; Wojerecy
- Location within Germany Location within Saxony
- Coordinates: 51°26′N 14°15′E
- Country: Germany
- State: Saxony
- District: Bautzen

Government
  - Mayor (2020–27): Torsten Ruban-Zeh (SPD)

Area
  - Total: 95.44 km^{2} (36.85 sq mi)
- Elevation: 117 m (384 ft)

Population (2025-12-31)
  - Total: 30,458
  - Density: 319.1/km^{2} (826.5/sq mi)
- Demonym(s): German: Hoyerswerdaer; Upper Sorbian: Wojerowčan (m.), Wojerowčanka (f.)
- Time zone: UTC+01:00 (CET)
  - Summer (DST): UTC+02:00 (CEST)
- Postal codes: 02977
- Dialling codes: 03571, 035722
- Vehicle registration: BZ, BIW, HY, KM
- Website: www.hoyerswerda.de

Hoyerswerda (German: [hɔʏɐsˈvɛʁda]) or Wojerecy (Upper Sorbian: [ˈwɔjɛʁɛtsɨ]) is a major district town in the district of Bautzen in the German state of Saxony. It is located in the Sorbian settlement area of Upper Lusatia, in which the Upper Sorbian language is spoken in addition to German.

Hoyerswerda is divided into the Old Town and the New Town, surrounded by village areas. The Old Town is the historical centre with many old houses and sight-seeing attractions, the New Town is more modern and varicoloured. Prior to the renovation of the town, prefabricated apartment blocks predominated in this area.

The town has many lakes, marshes and waterways in its surrounding area, because of its situation in Lusatia. This brings many tourists to spend their holidays there. It is attractive for cyclists and inline skaters who use recently created paths meandering among the lakes.

== Geography ==
The town is situated in the north of the District of Bautzen, close to the borders of Saxony with Brandenburg. Major cities and towns in proximity are Cottbus 35 kilometres (22 miles) in the north-west, Dresden 55 kilometres (34 miles) in the south-west and Berlin 150 kilometres (93 miles) in the north. Hoyerswerda is part of Upper Lusatia and lies on a rural plain characterised by the presence of several lakes and some marshes.

=== Districts ===
Hoyerswerda is divided beside the Old Town and New Town into the following districts (names given in German/Upper Sorbian):

- Bröthen-Michalken (German), Brětnja/Michałki (Upper Sorbian)
- Dörgenhausen/Němcy
- Knappenrode/Hórnikecy
- Schwarzkollm/Čorny Chołmc
- Zeißig/Ćisk

==== Old Town ====
The old town of Hoyerswerda is divided into eleven districts:

Neida, Dresdner Vorstadt, Am Bahnhof ('At the Railway Station'), Am Stadtrand ('On the Outskirts'), an der Neupetershainer Bahn, An der Thrune, Innere Altstadt ('Inner Historic Centre'), Senftenberger Vorstadt, Spremberger Vorstadt, Nördliche Elsteraue, Südliche Elsteraue.

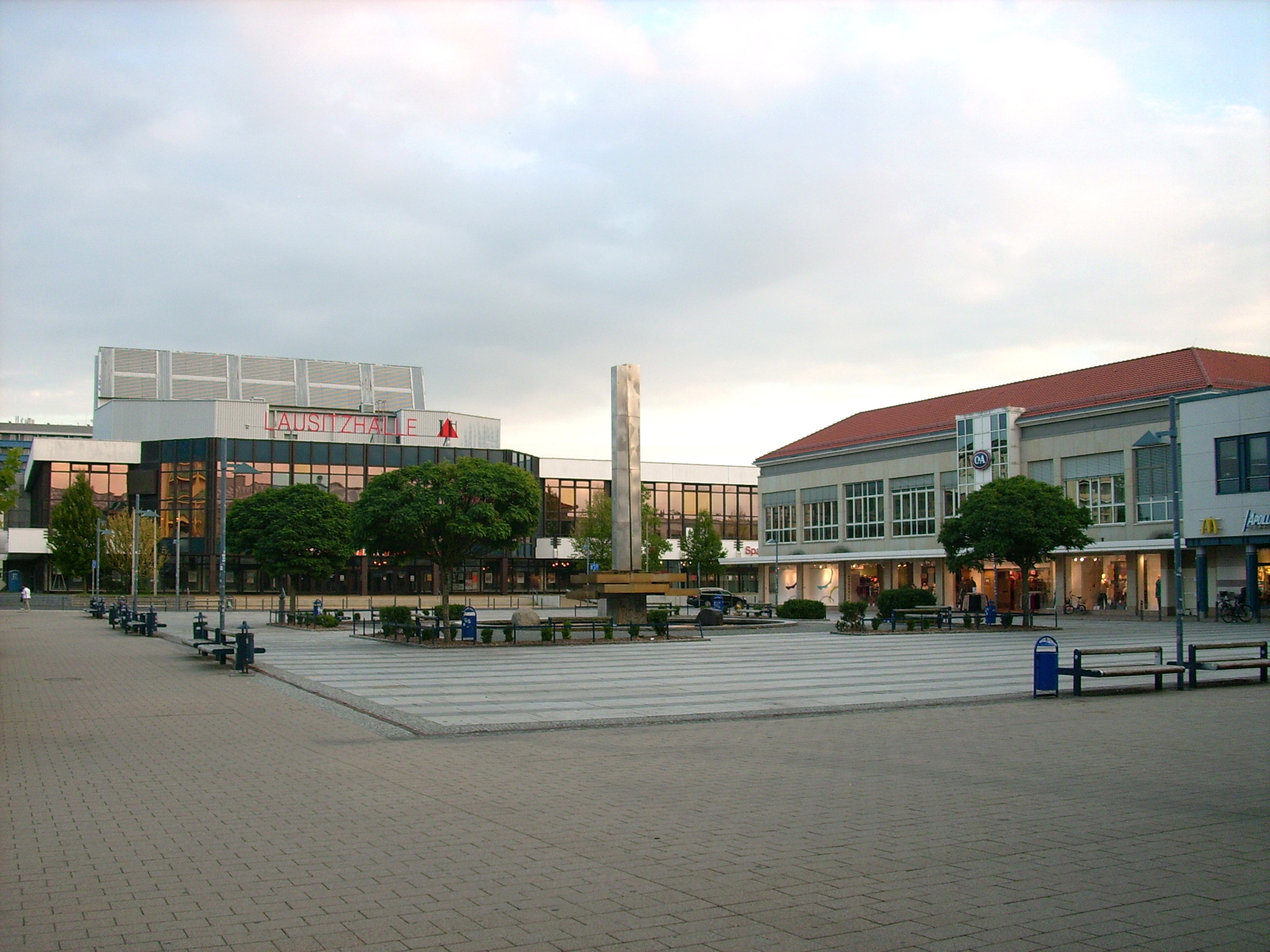
View at the New Town's Lusatian Square (Lausitzer Platz)

==== New Town ====
The new town of Hoyerswerda is divided into 14 districts:

Neustadt Zentrum ('New Town Centre'), Kühnicht, Grünewaldring, Gondelteich ('Gondola Lake'), Wohnkomplex I, Wohnkomplex II, Wohnkomplex III, Wohnkomplex IV, Wohnkomplex V/VE, Wohnkomplex VI, Wohnkomplex VII, Wohnkomplex VIII, Wohnkomplex IX, Wohnkomplex X.

== History ==
=== Early history ===
The first settlers arrived in this area in 700 AD. They were Milceni Slavs. Many artifacts from this old culture have been found in the Hoyerswerda area.

1000 AD saw the construction of the first church in the town; the Heilige Familie ('Holy Family') which is still standing today in the historic centre of Hoyerswerda.

In 1150, Hoyerswerda first appeared on a map of Lusatia.

The city was first mentioned in 1268. At the time the mayor was Hoyer von Vredeberg.

In 1371 it was designated an official market town. Before this Hoyerswerda was a very little town with few structures, but the city then grew under the leadership of the new mayor Karl IV.

It received municipal rights from Freiherr von Duba on 19 December 1423, as well as the right to elect its own council.

In the 17th century, the city experienced many problems due to the 30 Years War. The Number of inhabitants dropped drastically, but recovered by the end of the century.

In 1624, Hoyerswerda became the capital of the Spremberg district. A few years later the district took the name Hoyerswerda because of the growing importance of the city.

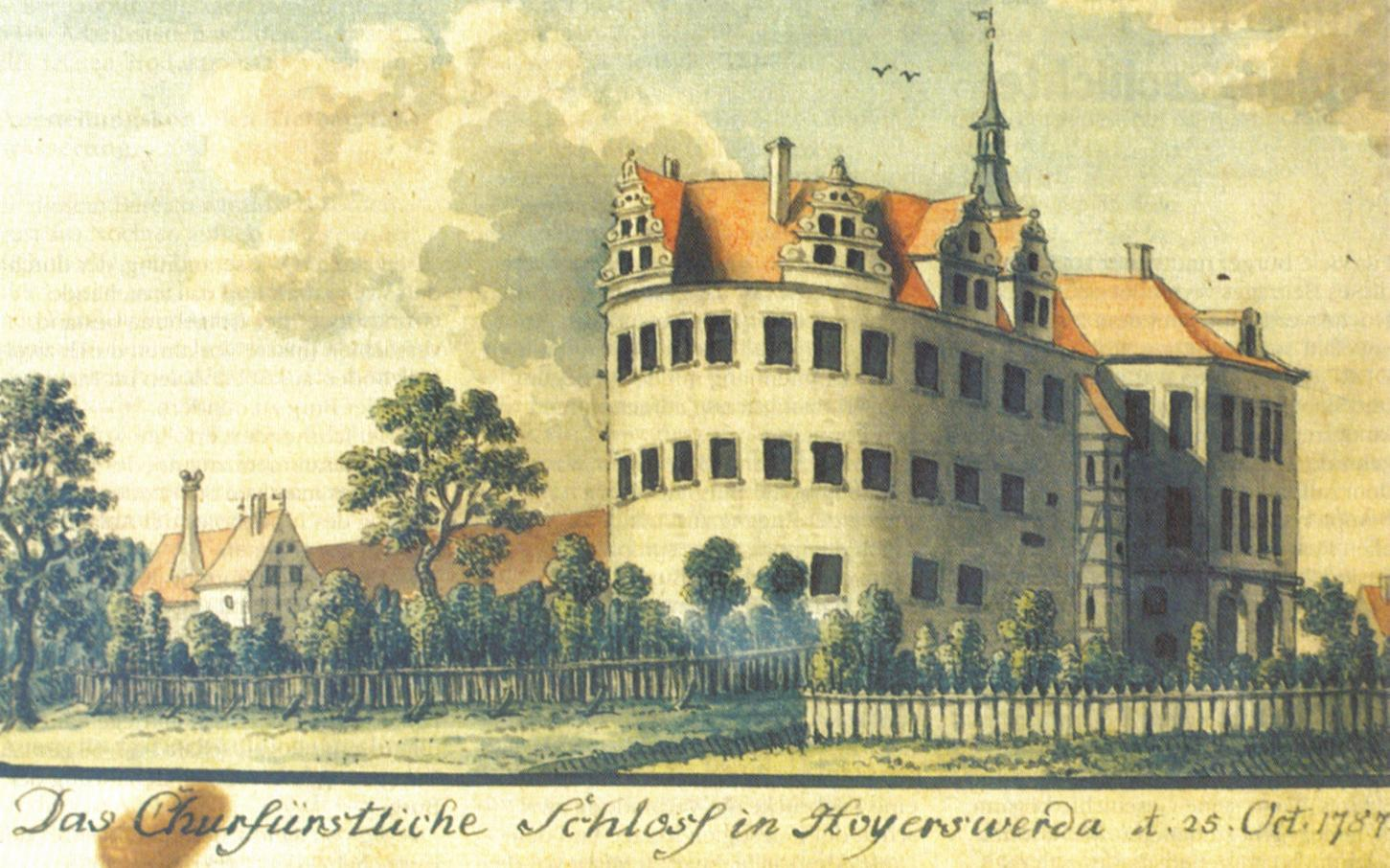
Hoyerswerda Castle in the 18th century

In the middle of this century Hoyerswerda had become the largest town in the Lusatian region.

In the 18th century the Polish King and Elector of Saxony, Augustus II the Strong, gave the Duchy of Hoyerswerda to Ursula Katharina Lubomirska, who helped the town develop trade and manufacturing. In 1737, King Augustus III of Poland bought the town from Lubomirska. The King used to stop in the Hoyerswerda Castle during his travels from Dresden to Warsaw. The Battle of Hoyerswerda occurred nearby in 1759 during the Seven Years' War.

In 1815 Hoyerswerda became part of the Kingdom of Prussia. Initially it was administered as part of the Spremberg-Hoyerswerdaer Kreis of the Province of Brandenburg, but in 1825 the southern part was split off to form Landkreis Hoyerswerda and attached to the Province of Silesia. In 1871, with Prussia, it became part of the German Empire. In 1873 a new railway between Hoyerswerda and Ruhland opened. It had a positive effect on the economic development of the city. In 1912, the Domowina, the organisation of the Sorbs, was founded in the city. In 1918, the Sorbs protested here against the policy of Germanisation. The town became part of the Prussian Province of Lower Silesia in 1919.

=== Recent history ===
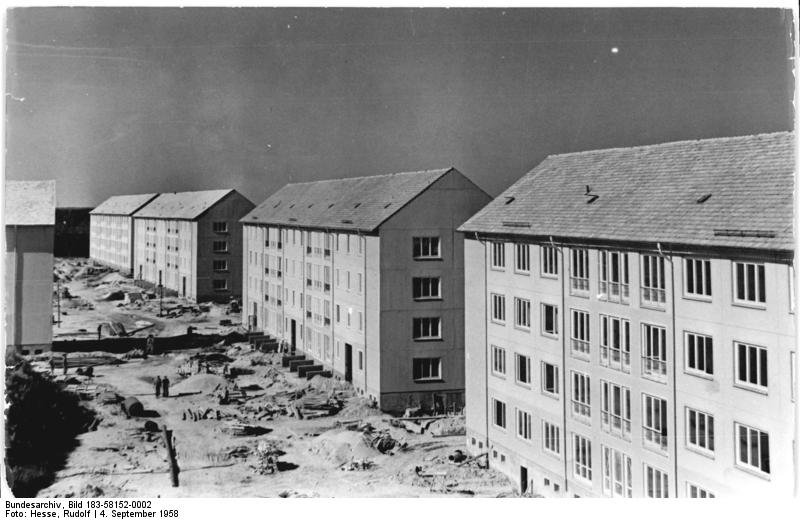
GDR type housing built in the 1950s

During the Second World War, in 1944, the Dulag 124 prisoner-of-war camp was relocated from Slavuta to Hoyerswerda. At the end of the war the town was declared a core centre of German defence and was therefore heavily damaged. The invading Soviet Red Army set the town on fire. It became part of Saxony again after the war, but from 1952, it was administered by the Bezirk (Region) of Cottbus, until 1990, when the states of East Germany were abolished.

During the GDR period, Hoyerswerda became an important industrial town. The lignite processing enterprise "Schwarze Pumpe" was established in 1955 (it is today in the federal state of Brandenburg). From 1957, the demand for new living space rose dramatically. In the following years, 10 new living areas were established with tens of thousands of apartments being built. In 1981, the city reached its maximum number of inhabitants, with 71,054 residents. At that time, more children per inhabitant were born in Hoyerswerda than anywhere else in the GDR. Upon reunification in 1990, the people of the city decided to become part of the reconstituted state of Saxony. With the end of the GDR and the reorganisation of the East German economy, many enterprises in the industrial region of Hoyerswerda were scaled down or closed.

In 1991 multiple xenophobic attacks targeted immigrant workers from the Far East as well as asylum seekers from Asia, Africa and Eastern Europe. A hostel accommodating asylum seekers was attacked and petrol bombs were thrown. Media coverage of the unrest shocked many in Germany and abroad, provoking much public debate.

Between 1993 and 1998, several smaller villages became part of the city, but the number of overall inhabitants declined rapidly, from about 70,000 people in the 1980s to about 35,000 people by the end of 2012. There have been attempts to renovate the city. Many of the apartment blocks built during the time of the GDR have been demolished or renovated. This project, like others, was financed with money from the EU and the Federal Republic of Germany.

Its role as an independently ruled town ("Kreisfreie Stadt") in Saxony disappeared in 2008 with the reshaping of the regional administration of Saxony.

== Sights ==
Main sights include:

- the Hoyerswerda castle
- the Market Square (Markt) in the Old Town, including:
  - the Old Town Hall (Altes Rathaus)
  - an 18th-century Polish-Saxon post milestone with coats of arms of the Polish–Lithuanian Commonwealth and the Electorate of Saxony and the monogram of King Augustus II the Strong
  - the Sorbian Fountain (Sorbenbrunnen) from 1980
- the St. John's Church (Johanneskirche)
- the former seat of the Domowina, built in 1885
- the New Town Hall (Neues Rathaus), built in 1904
- Planetarium Hoyerswerda, founded in the 1960s
- the Lusatian Square (Lausitzer Platz) in the New Town with the Lusatian Hall (Lausitzhalle/Łužiska Hala)
- the ZCOM Zuse-Computer-Museum
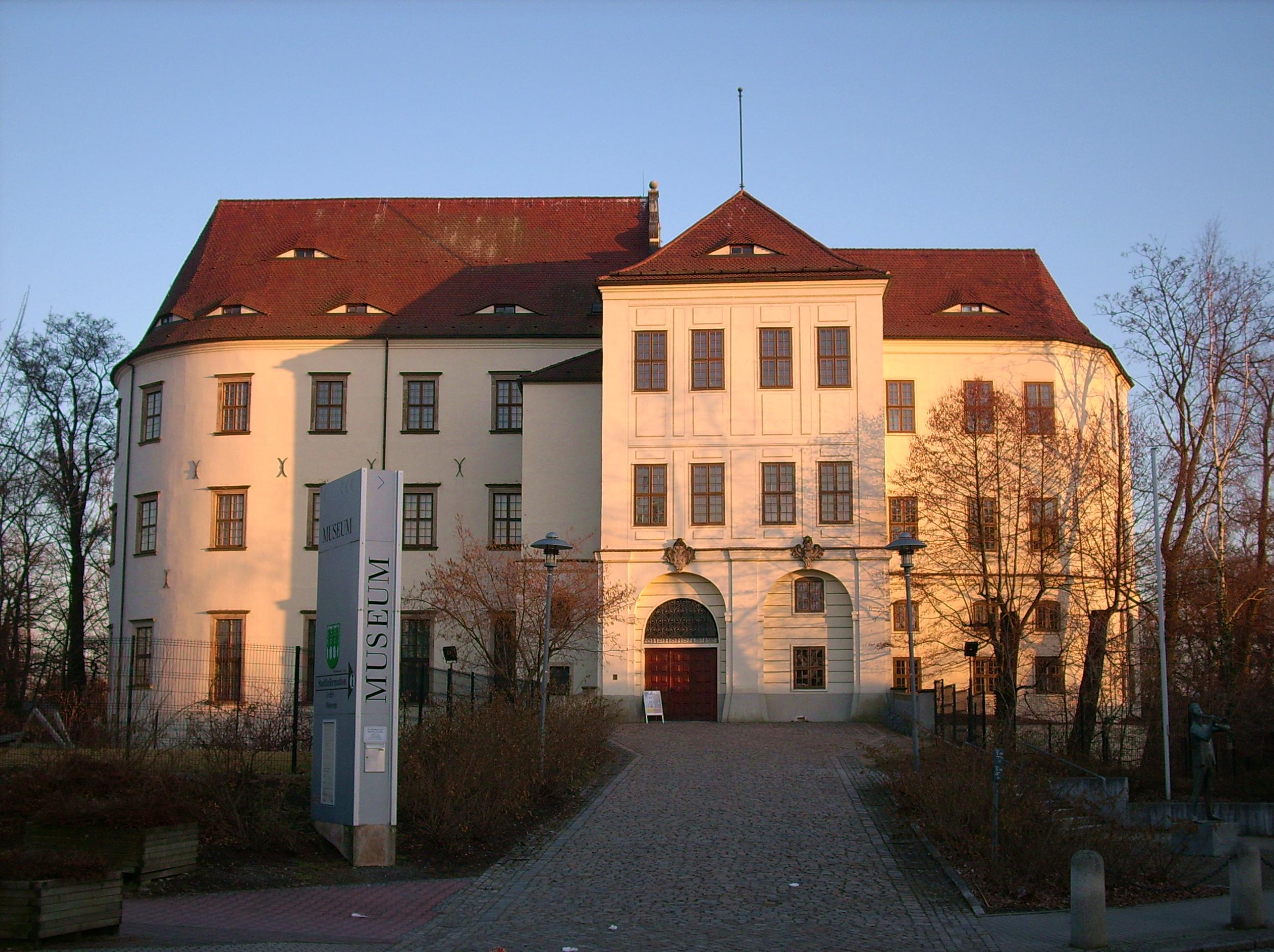
Hoyerswerda Castle

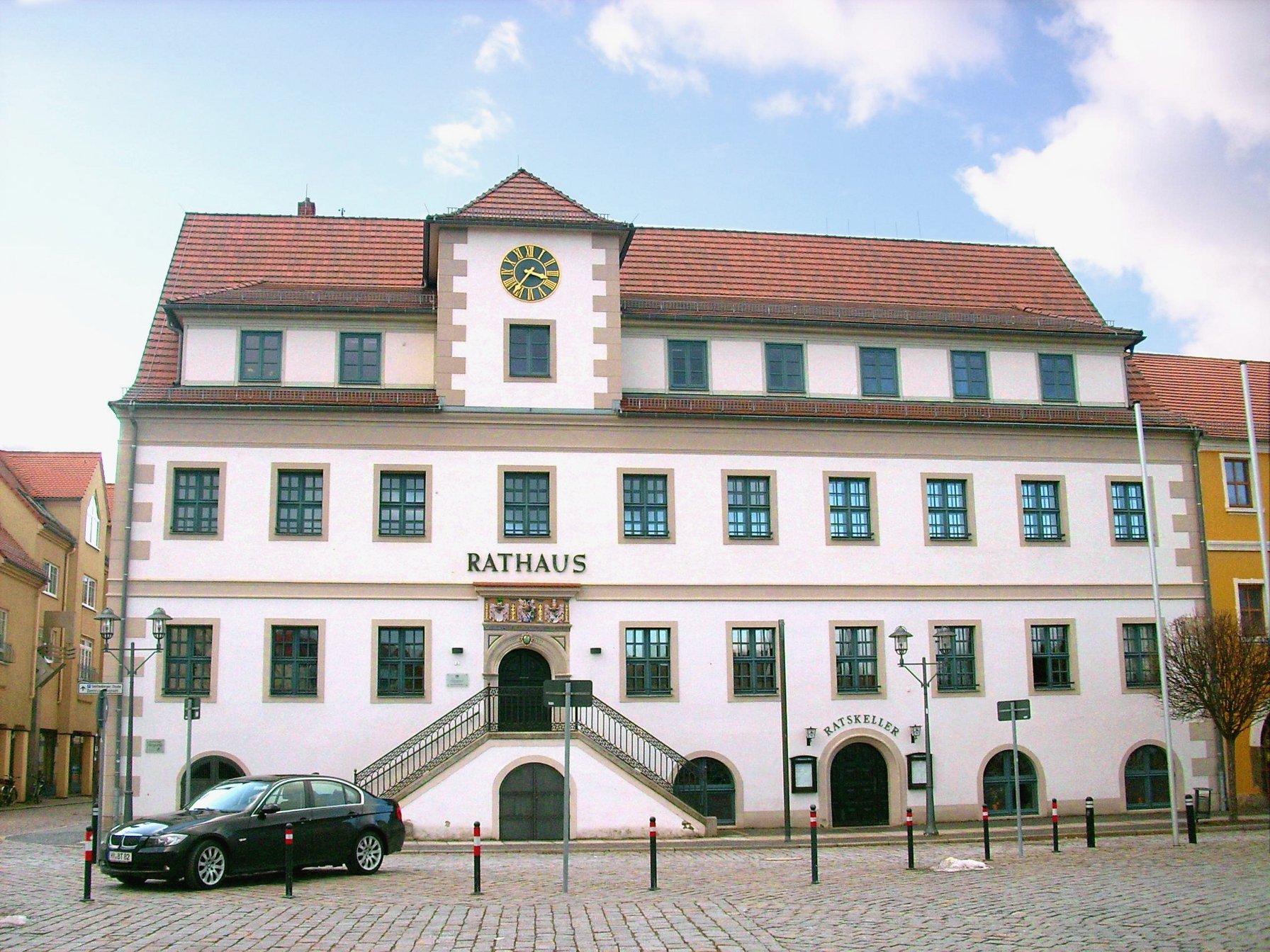
Old Town Hall

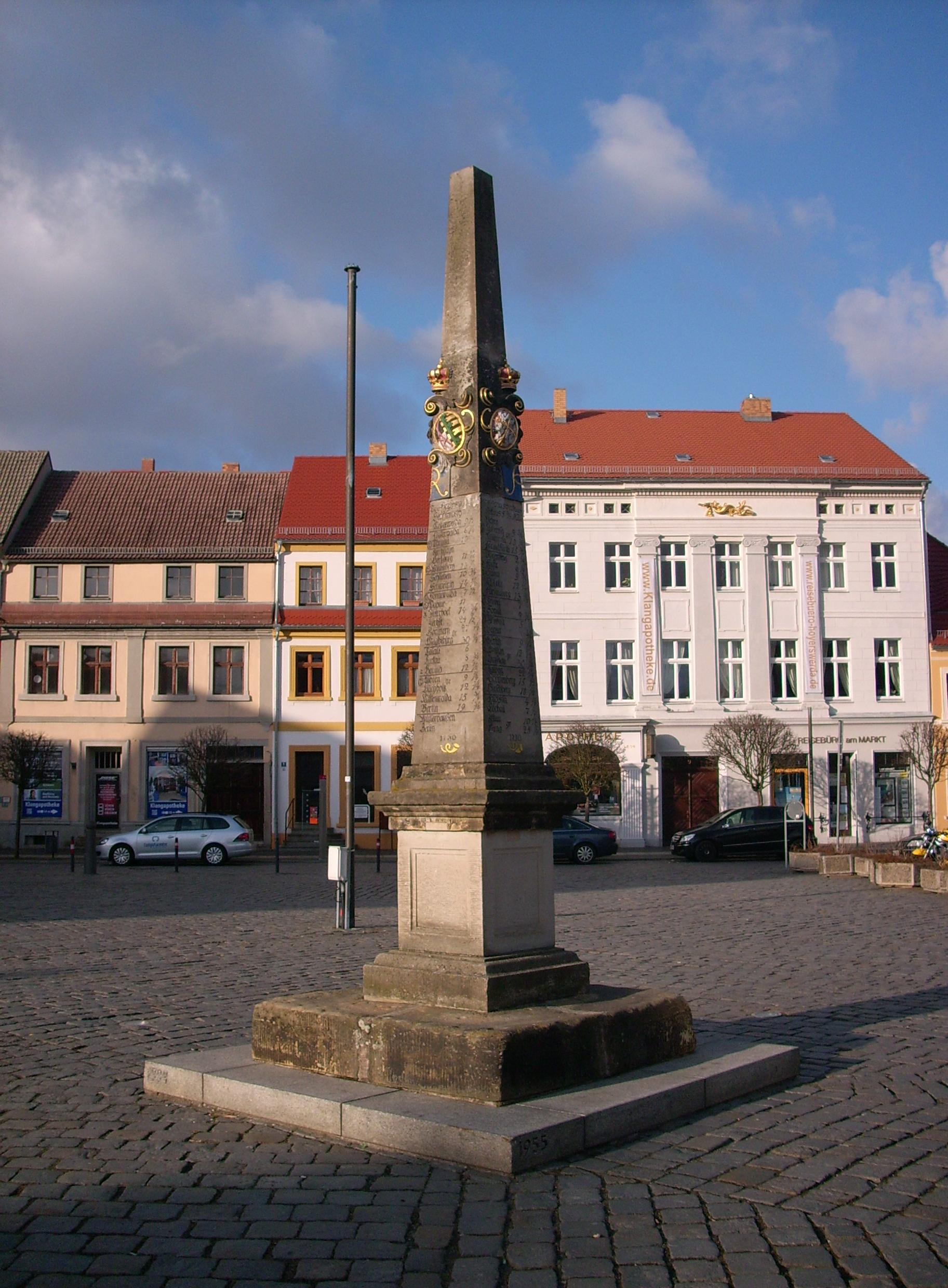
Polish-Saxon post milestone

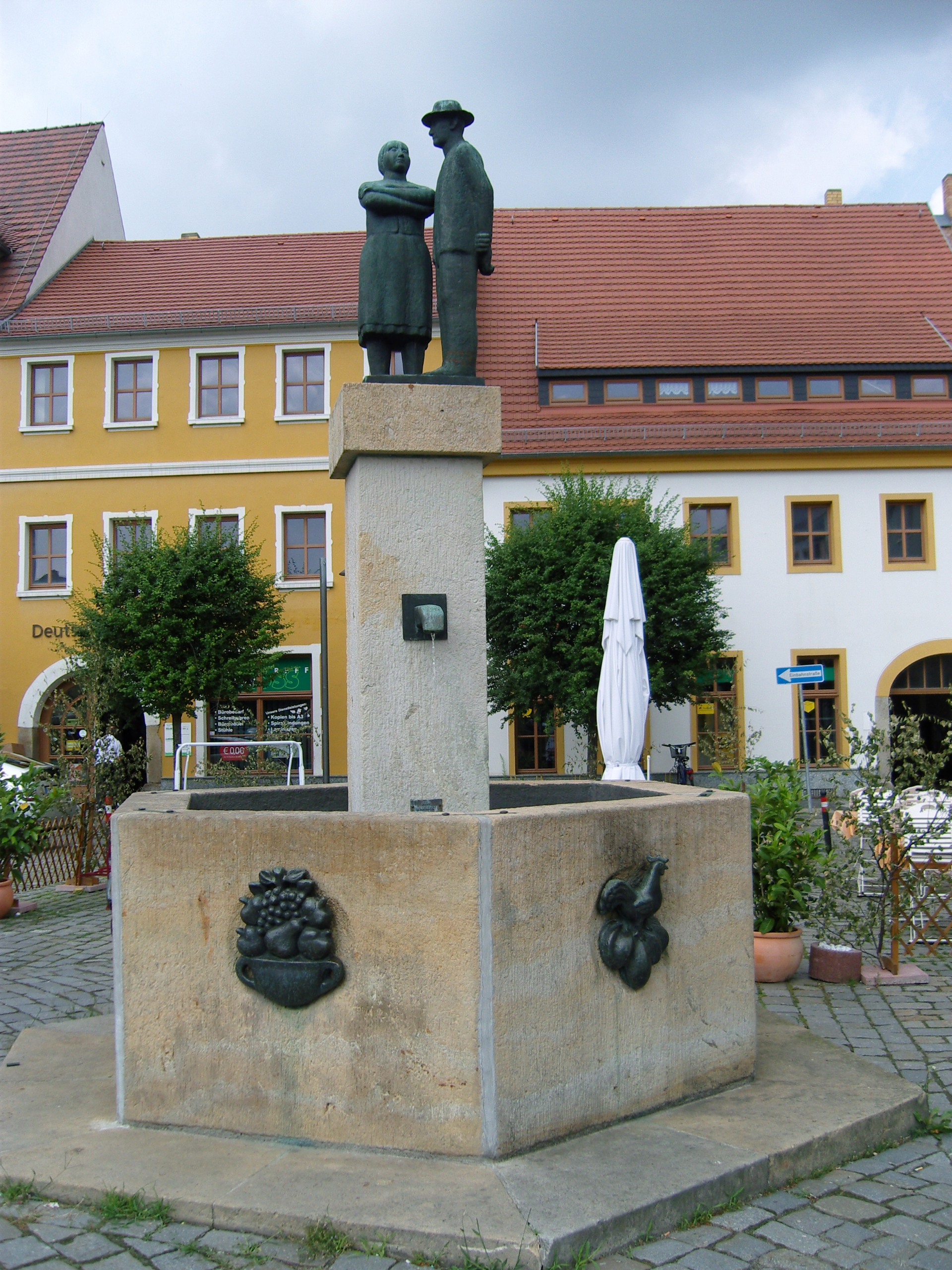
Sorbian Fountain

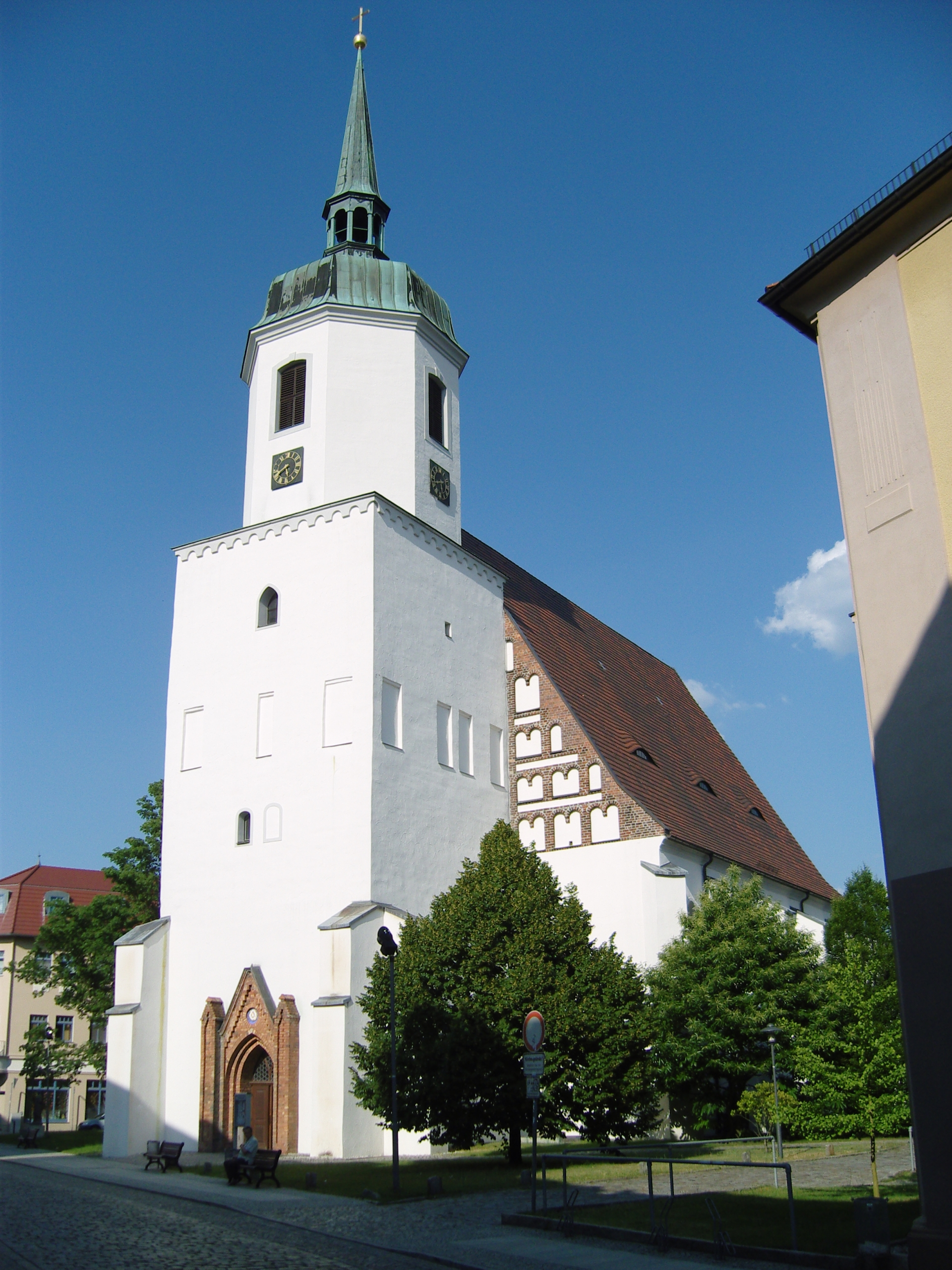
St. John's Church

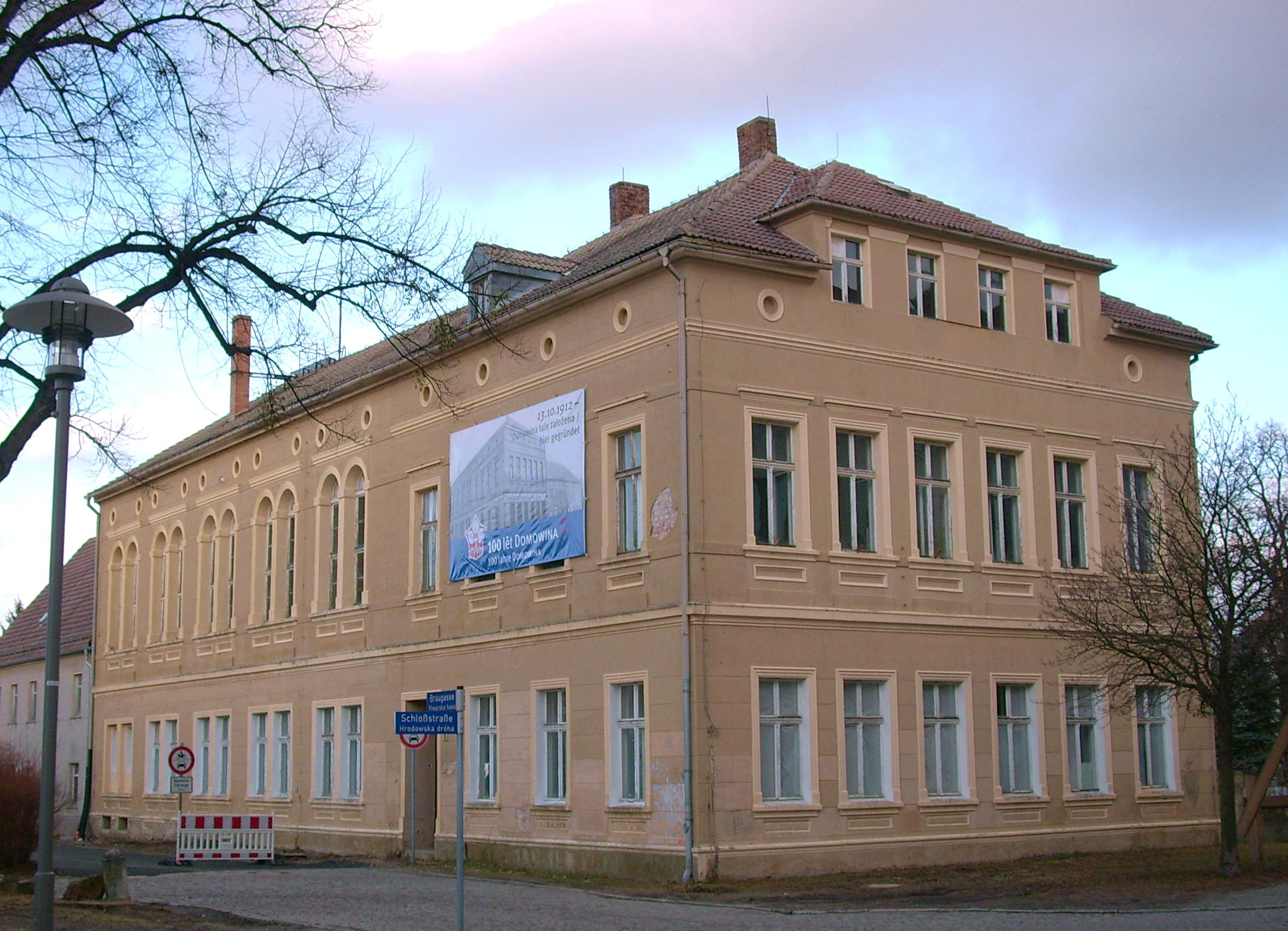
Former seat of the Domowina

== Seats in the Local council (Stadtrat) ==
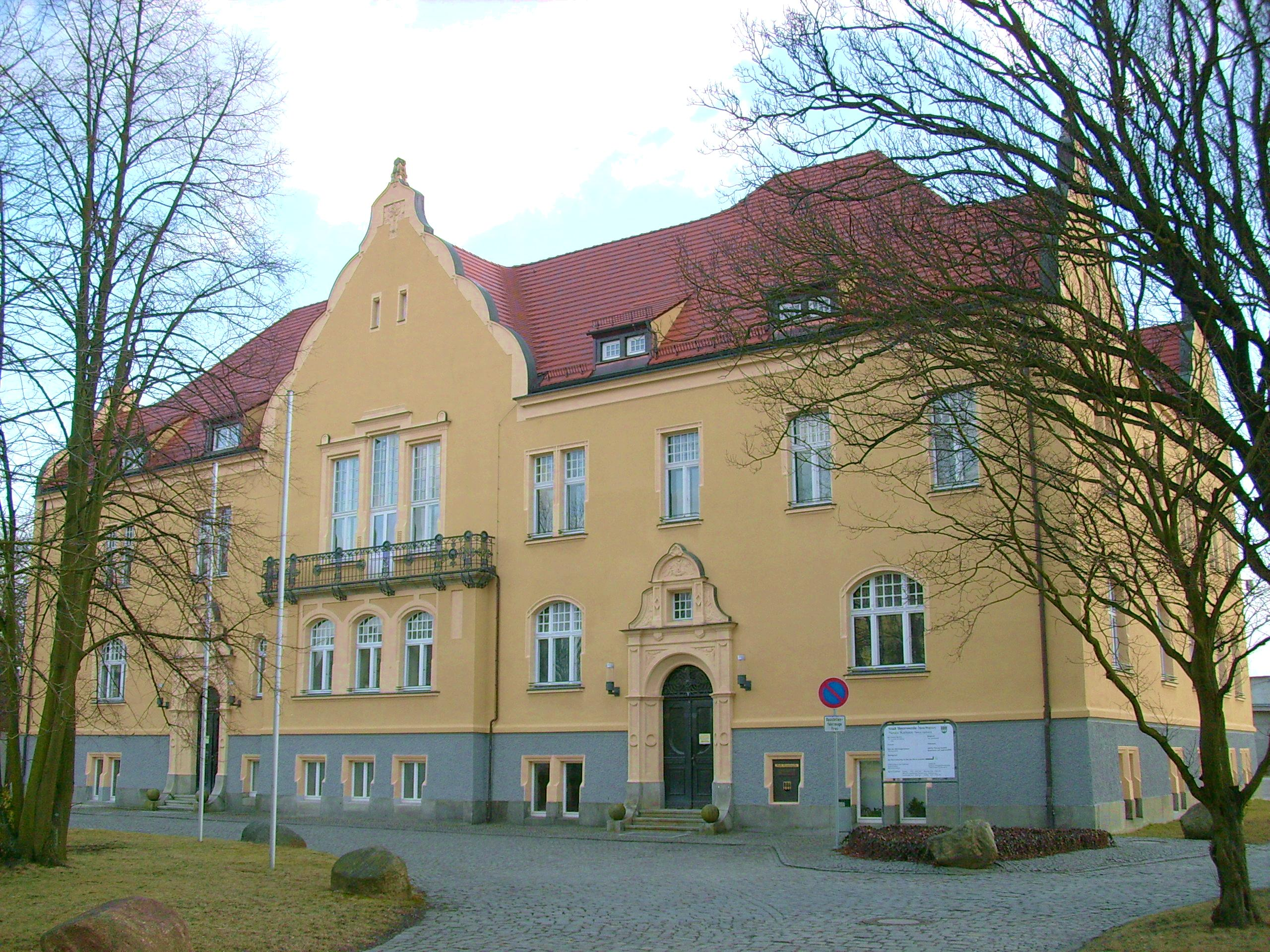
New Town Hall

Elections in 2014:

- CDU: 10 seats
- The Left: 8 seats
- Free voters: 5 seats
- SPD: 4 seats
- AH: 2 seats
- NPD: 1 seat
- Total: 30 seats

== Economic situation ==
While part of East Germany, employment in Hoyerswerda was provided by a power plant, glassworks, coal mines, and an army artillery range. With the reunification of Germany and the subsequent demise of a centrally planned economy, the city lost many jobs as the glassworks and artillery range were closed, and the power plant reduced its payroll. The industries on the secondary sector disappeared nearly completely. It is, however, expected that new houses must be built in Hoyerswerda, because of an anticipated increase in population due to copper mining at Schwarze Pumpe. There is also a thermal power plant planned for Hoyerswerda, because the district heating contract with Schwarze Pumpe will end in 2016.

Unemployment remains at 13%. Hoyerswerda holds third place regarding poverty of children according to a statistics of the Child Protection Alliance.

== Notable people ==
- Alfred Otto Herz (1856–1906), entomologist
- Rudolf von Sebottendorf (1875–1945), founder of the anti-semitic and racial Thule Society
- William August Schulze (German-American rocket scientist and Operation Paperclip hire
- Heinz Kozur (1942–2013), paleontologist and stratigrapher
- Petra Pfaff (born 1960), track and field athlete
- Roland Hennig (born 1967), racing cyclist
- Marcel Rozgonyi (born 1976), footballer
- Matthias Heidrich (born 1977), footballer
- Tony Jantschke (born 1990), footballer
- Marvin Stefaniak (born 1995), footballer

=== Lived in Hoyerswerda ===
- Ursula Katharina Lubomirska (1680–1743), Polish noblewoman, mistress of King Augustus II the Strong (lived here, was owner of the castle for over 30 years)
- Jan Henryk Dąbrowski (1755–1818), Polish general, national hero of Poland (grew up here)
- Konrad Zuse (1910–1995), computer pioneer (did his Abitur here)
- Rochus Misch (1917–2013), radio operator, bodyguard of Hitler (did his painter education here)
- Brigitte Reimann (1933–1973), writer (lived here in the 1960s)
- Gerhard Gundermann (1955–1998), songwriter and rock musician (Abitur, life and musical work until 1987, sepulchre on the graveyard of Hoyerswerda)

== Twin towns – sister cities ==
Hoyerswerda is twinned with:

- Dillingen, Germany (1988)
- Huittinen, Finland (1998)
- Środa Wielkopolska, Poland (2006)

== See also ==
- Hoyerswerda riots
- Dubringer Moor
