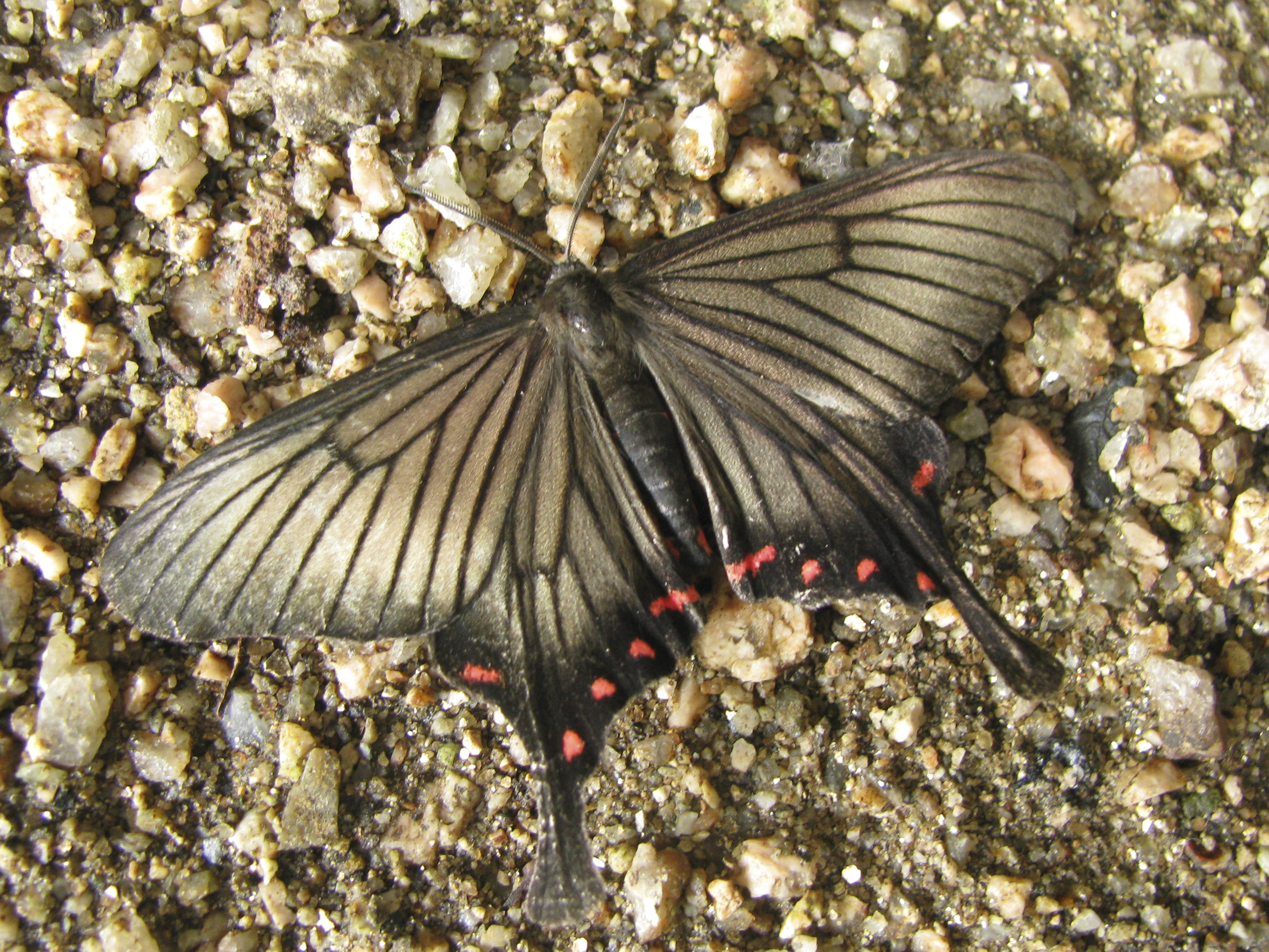

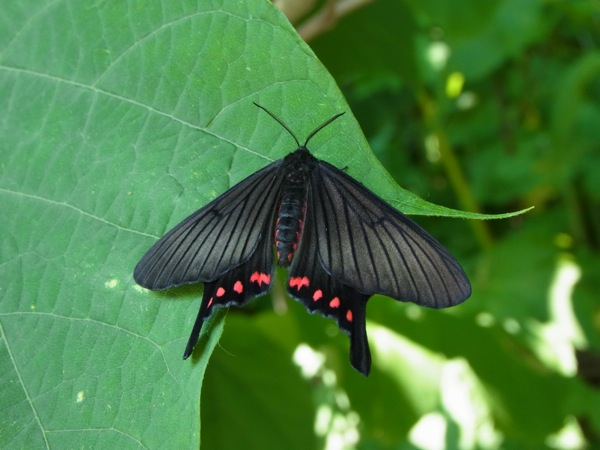

Scientific classification
- Domain: Eukaryota
- Kingdom: Animalia
- Phylum: Arthropoda
- Class: Insecta
- Order: Lepidoptera
- Family: Epicopeiidae
- Genus: Epicopeia
- Species: E. hainesii

Binomial name
- Epicopeia hainesii Holland, 1889

Synonyms
- Epicopeia chinensis Leech; Epicopeia mipallida Oberthür, 1920; Epicopeia pallescens Oberthür, 1920; Epicopeia simulans Leech, 1889; Epicopeia sinicaria Leech, 1897

= Epicopeia hainesii =

Species of moth

Epicopeia hainesii is a moth of the family Epicopeiidae, first described by William Jacob Holland in 1889. It is found in the Korean Peninsula, Japan and Taiwan.

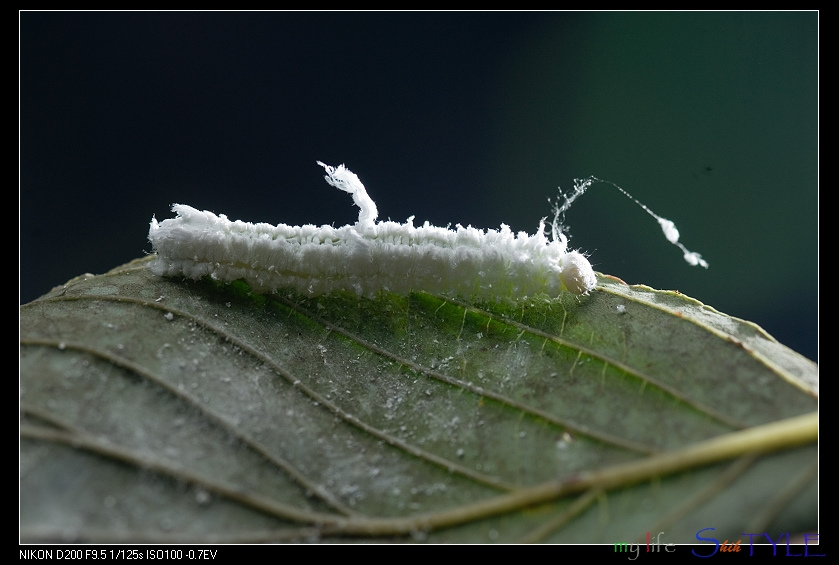
Epicopeia hainesii matsumurai larva

The wingspan is 55–60 mm.

== Subspecies ==
- Epicopeia hainesii hainesii Holland, 1889
- Epicopeia hainesii matsumurai Okano, 1973 (Taiwan)
- Epicopeia hainesii tsushimana Inoue, 1978 (Japan)
