= Epicopeia battaka =

Scientific classification
- Domain: Eukaryota
- Kingdom: Animalia
- Phylum: Arthropoda
- Class: Insecta
- Order: Lepidoptera
- Family: Epicopeiidae
- Genus: Epicopeia
- Species: E. battaka

Binomial name
- Epicopeia battaka Dohrn, 1895

Species of moth

Epicopeia battaka is a moth in the family Epicopeiidae. It was described by Heinrich Wolfgang Ludwig Dohrn in 1895. It is found on Sumatra and Peninsular Malaysia.

== Subspecies ==
- Epicopeia battaka battaka (northern Sumatra)
- Epicopeia battaka dempona Kishida & Endo, 1999 (southern Sumatra)
- Epicopeia battaka malayana Kishida & Endo, 1999 (Peninsular Malaysia)
