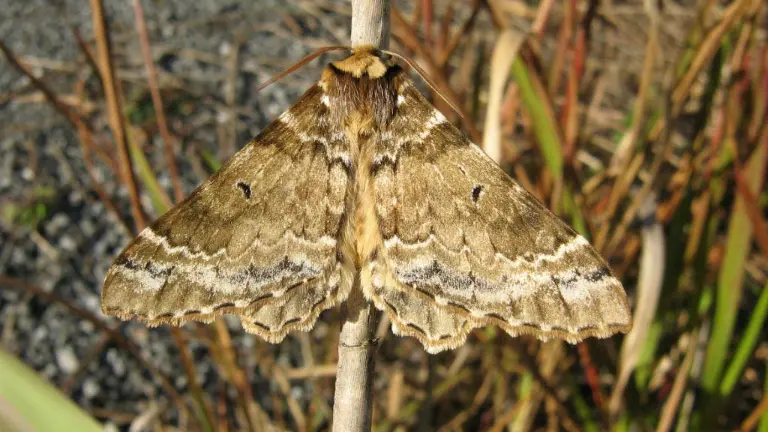

Scientific classification
- Kingdom: Animalia
- Phylum: Arthropoda
- Clade: Pancrustacea
- Class: Insecta
- Order: Lepidoptera
- Family: Pseudobistonidae
- Subfamily: Pseudobistoninae; Minet, Rajaei & Stüning, 2015
- Genus: Pseudobiston; Inoue, 1994
- Species: P. pinratanai

Binomial name
- Pseudobiston pinratanai Inoue, 1994

= Pseudobiston =

Genus of moths

Pseudobiston is a genus of moths in the family Pseudobistonidae. It contains only one species, Pseudobiston pinratanai, which is found in North Thailand and North Vietnam.

It was originally assigned to the family Geometridae, but in 2015 it was moved to its own, separate family: Pseudobistonidae.
