= Chatamla =

Scientific classification
- Domain: Eukaryota
- Kingdom: Animalia
- Phylum: Arthropoda
- Class: Insecta
- Order: Lepidoptera
- Family: Epicopeiidae
- Genus: Chatamla; Moore, 1881
- Species: C. flavescens

Binomial name
- Chatamla flavescens Walker, 1854

Synonyms
- Euschema flavescens Walker, 1854; Chatamla nigrescens Moore; Chatamla tricolor Butler

Genus of moths

Chatamla is a monotypic moth genus in the family Epicopeiidae described by Frederic Moore in 1881. Its only species, Chatamla flavescens, was described by Francis Walker in 1854. It is found in northern India.
