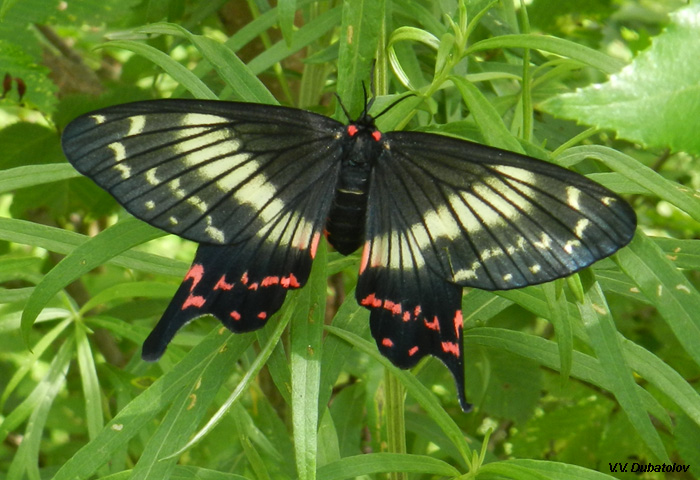
- Epicopeia mencia var. leucorrhea

Scientific classification
- Domain: Eukaryota
- Kingdom: Animalia
- Phylum: Arthropoda
- Class: Insecta
- Order: Lepidoptera
- Family: Epicopeiidae
- Genus: Epicopeia
- Species: E. mencia

Binomial name
- Epicopeia mencia Moore, [1875]

Synonyms
- Epicopeia formosana Nagano, 1912; Epicopeia albofasciata Djakonov, 1926; Epicopeia longicauda Matsumura, 1931; Epicopeia mencia licenti Strelkov, 1932; Epicopeia mencia var. aemilii Strelkov, 1932; Epicopeia mencia var. gandissarti Strelkov, 1932; Epicopeia hirayamai Matsumura, 1935

= Epicopeia mencia =

Species of moth

Epicopeia mencia is a moth in the family Epicopeiidae. It was described by Frederic Moore in 1875. It is found in China, Vietnam, Korea, the Russian Far East, Japan and Taiwan.

The wingspan is about 60 mm.

The larvae feed on Ulmus species. There is one generation per year. The species overwinters in the pupal stage.

== Gallery ==
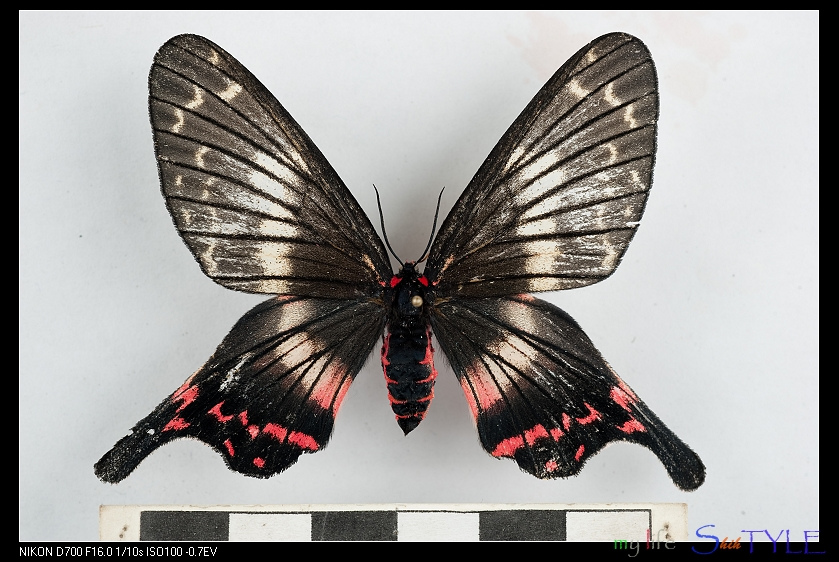

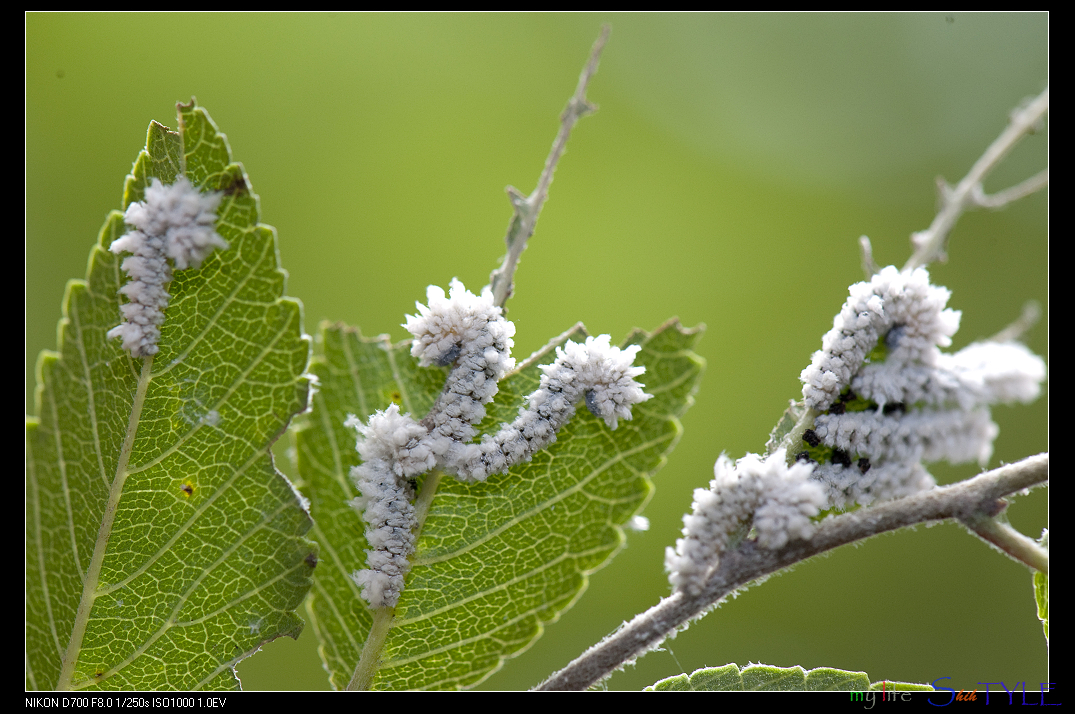

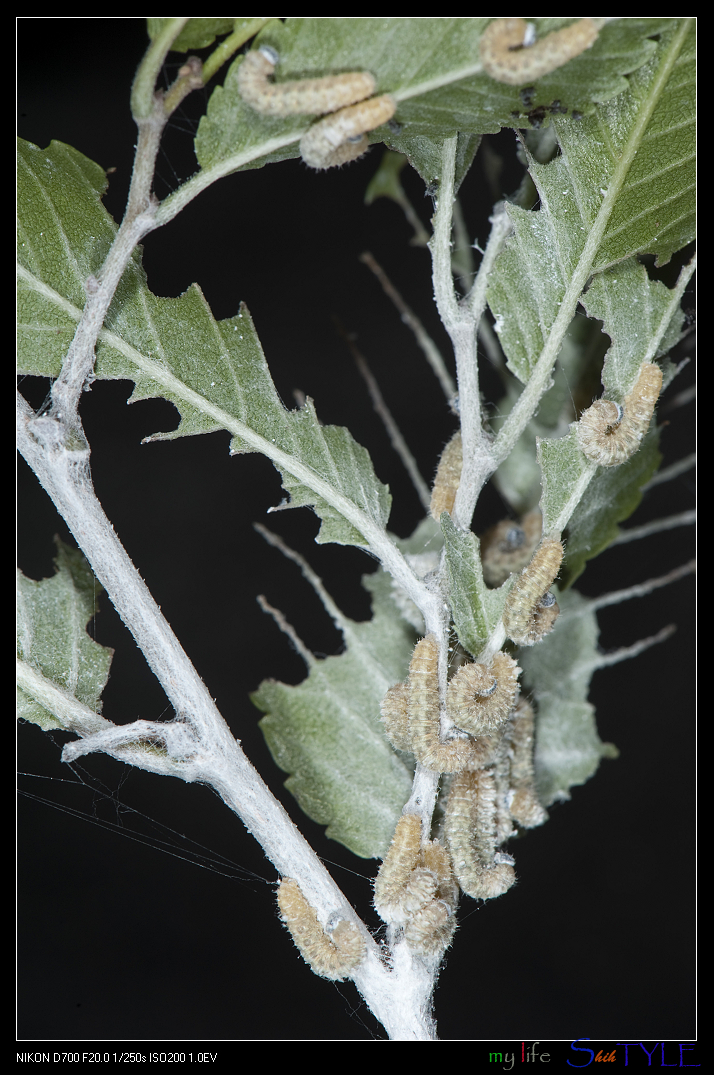
