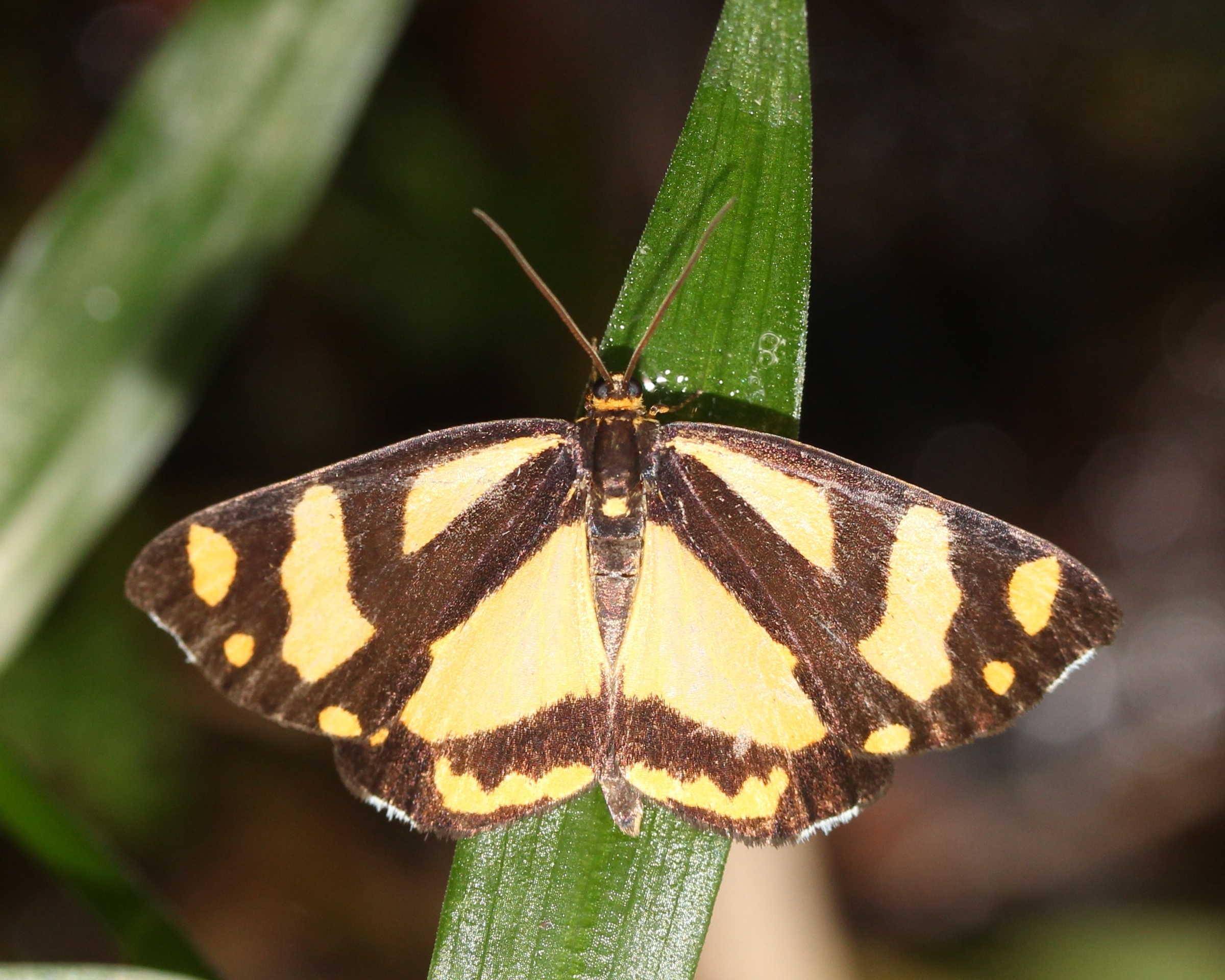
- Psychostrophia melanargia

Scientific classification
- Domain: Eukaryota
- Kingdom: Animalia
- Phylum: Arthropoda
- Class: Insecta
- Order: Lepidoptera
- Family: Epicopeiidae
- Genus: Psychostrophia; Butler, 1877

= Psychostrophia =

Genus of moths

Psychostrophia is a genus of moths in the family Epicopeiidae. The genus was erected by Arthur Gardiner Butler in 1877.

== Species ==
- Psychostrophia melanargia Butler 1877
- Psychostrophia nymphidiaria (Oberthür, 1893)
- Psychostrophia picaria Leech, 1897
- Psychostrophia endoi Inoue, 1992
