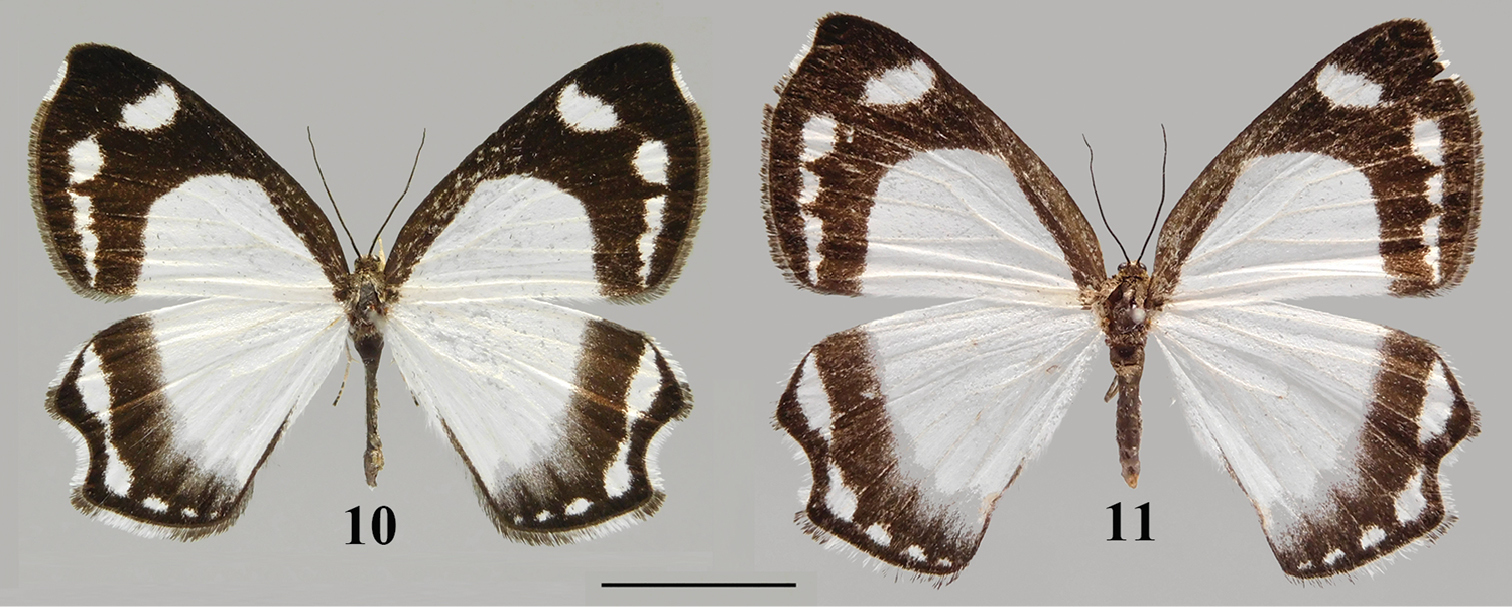

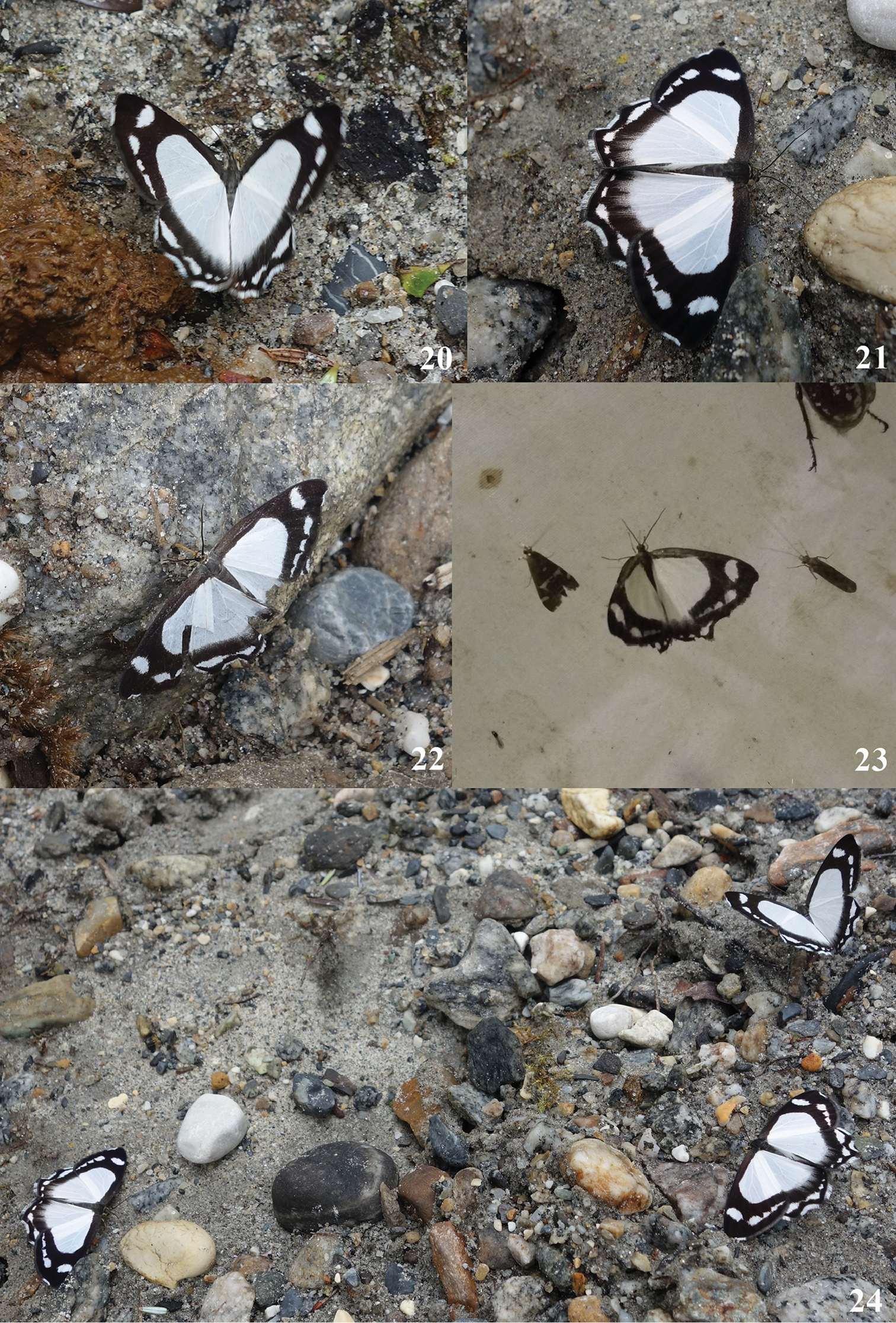

Scientific classification
- Kingdom: Animalia
- Phylum: Arthropoda
- Clade: Pancrustacea
- Class: Insecta
- Order: Lepidoptera
- Family: Epicopeiidae
- Genus: Burmeia; Minet, 2002
- Species: B. leesi

Binomial name
- Burmeia leesi Minet, 2002

= Burmeia =

Genus of moths

Burmeia leesi is a moth in the family Epicopeiidae. It is found in Burma.

The wingspan is about 28.5 mm for males and 31.5 mm for females.
