= Parabraxas =

Scientific classification
- Domain: Eukaryota
- Kingdom: Animalia
- Phylum: Arthropoda
- Class: Insecta
- Order: Lepidoptera
- Family: Epicopeiidae
- Genus: Parabraxas; Leech, 1897

Synonyms
- Oberthüria; Oberthueria Leech, 1897 (preocc. Staudinger, 1892); Methystria Seitz, 1912; Thuria Chu & Zhu, 1981

Genus of moths

Parabraxas is a genus of moths in the family Epicopeiidae.

== Species ==
- Parabraxas davidi (Oberthür, 1885)
- Parabraxas flavomarginaria (Leech, 1897)
- Parabraxas nigromacularia (Leech, 1897)

== Former species ==
- Parabraxas erebina (Oberthür, 1896)
