= Nossa nelcinna =

Scientific classification
- Domain: Eukaryota
- Kingdom: Animalia
- Phylum: Arthropoda
- Class: Insecta
- Order: Lepidoptera
- Family: Epicopeiidae
- Genus: Nossa
- Species: N. nelcinna

Binomial name
- Nossa nelcinna (Moore, [1875])

Synonyms
- Atossa nelcinna Moore, [1875]; Atossa nelcymna var. chinensis Leech, 1890

Species of moth

Nossa nelcinna is a moth in the family Epicopeiidae first described by Frederic Moore in 1875. It is found in the north-western Himalayas and China.

The wingspan is about 69 mm for males and 75 mm for females. Adults are greenish fuliginous (sooty) with black veins and a black longitudinal streak in the cell on the forewings. The spaces between the veins from the base to the disc of the forewings are greenish yellowish white and there is a transverse discal row of yellowish-white lunules, as well as a marginal row of small spots. The hindwings have yellowish-white spaces between the veins at the base. There is a discal transverse row of conical spots and a marginal row of quadrate spots.
