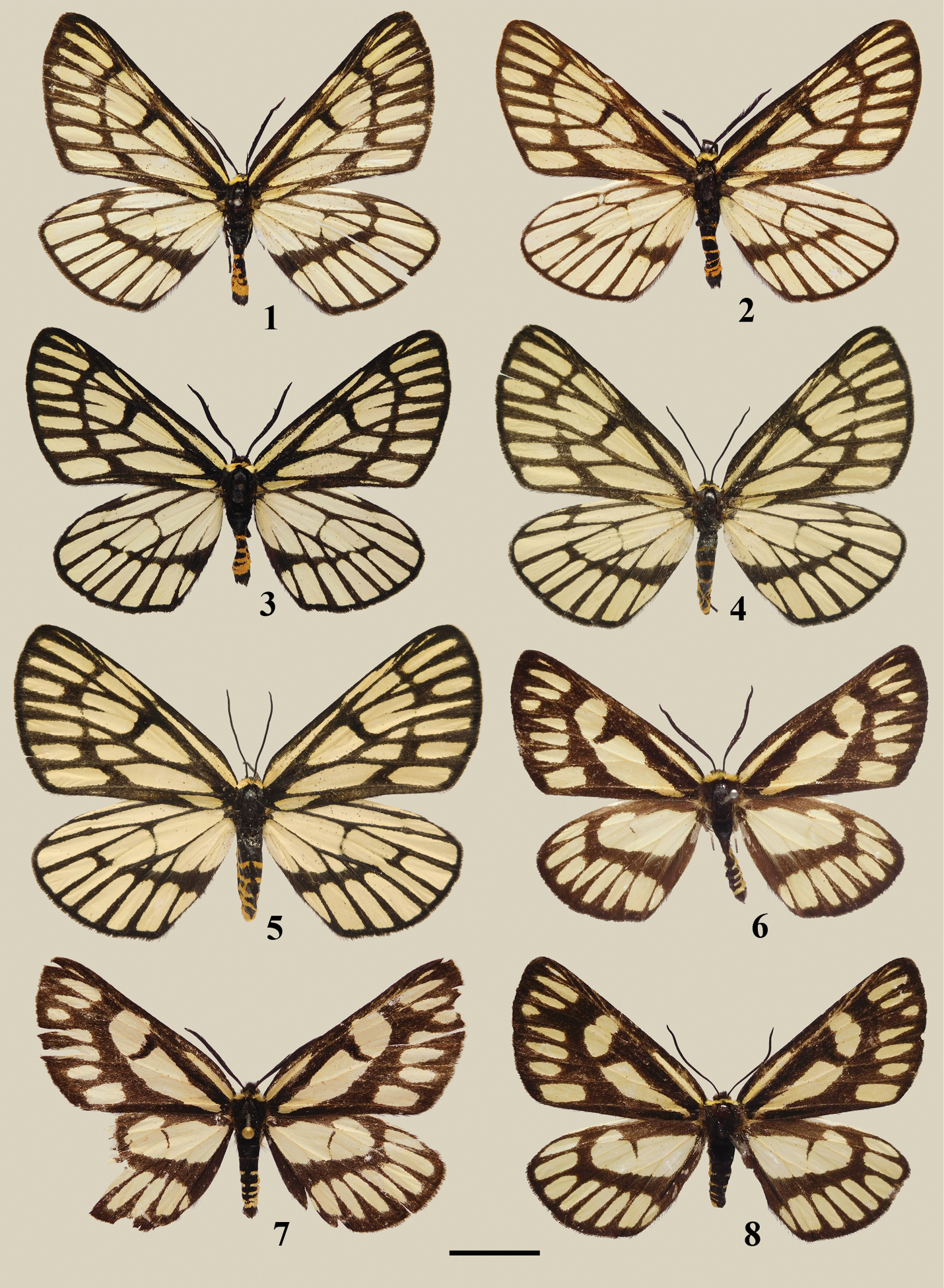
- S. joelmineti (1-5), S. funeralis (6-8)

Scientific classification
- Domain: Eukaryota
- Kingdom: Animalia
- Phylum: Arthropoda
- Class: Insecta
- Order: Lepidoptera
- Family: Epicopeiidae
- Genus: Schistomitra; Butler, 1881

= Schistomitra =

Genus of moths

Schistomitra is a moth genus in the family Epicopeiidae described by Arthur Gardiner Butler in 1881. The genus was regarded as a monotypic taxon for a long time, however a second species was newly described in 2019.

== Species ==
- Schistomitra funeralis Butler, 1881
- Schistomitra joelmineti Huang & Wang, 2019
