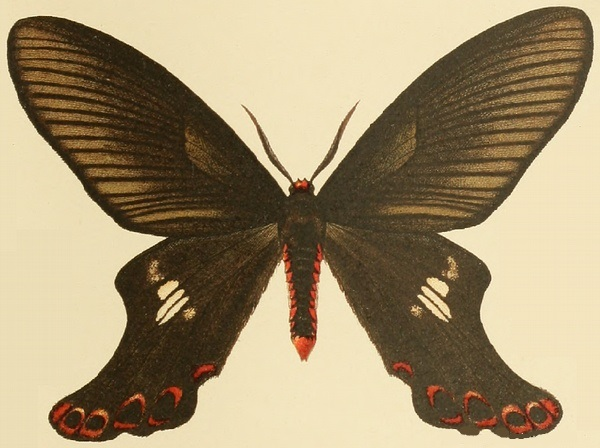

Scientific classification
- Kingdom: Animalia
- Phylum: Arthropoda
- Class: Insecta
- Order: Lepidoptera
- Family: Epicopeiidae
- Genus: Epicopeia
- Species: E. polydora

Binomial name
- Epicopeia polydora Westwood, 1841

Synonyms
- Epicopeia caudata Butler, 1881; Epicopeia diphilaea Moore, 1865; Epicopeia excisa Butler; Epicopeia lidderdalii Butler; Epicopeia maculata Butler; Epicopeia philoxenaea Moore, 1865

= Epicopeia polydora =

Species of moth

Epicopeia polydora is a moth of the family Epicopeiidae first described by John O. Westwood in 1841. It is found in south-east Asia, including Assam in India, Vietnam and Thailand.

The wingspan is 85–100 mm.
