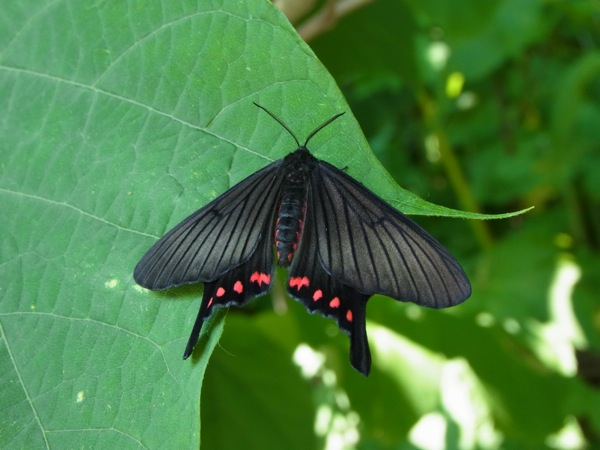
- Epicopeia hainesii

Scientific classification
- Kingdom: Animalia
- Phylum: Arthropoda
- Class: Insecta
- Order: Lepidoptera
- Family: Epicopeiidae
- Genus: Epicopeia; Westwood, 1841

Synonyms
- Epicopiopsis Grunberg, 1908

= Epicopeia =

Genus of moths

Epicopeia is a genus of moths in the family Epicopeiidae. The species in this genus mimic butterflies of the agehana-group in the genus Papilio and Atrophaneura alcinous.

== Species ==
- Epicopeia battaka Dohrn, 1895
- Epicopeia caroli Janet, 1909
- Epicopeia hainesii Holland, 1889
- Epicopeia leucomelaena Oberthür, 1919
- Epicopeia mencia Moore, [1875]
- Epicopeia philenora Westwood, 1841
- Epicopeia polydora Westwood, 1841

== Former species ==
- Epicopeia albofasciata Djakonov, 1926
- Epicopeia longicauda Matsumura, 1931
