= Alfred Otto Herz =

German entomologist

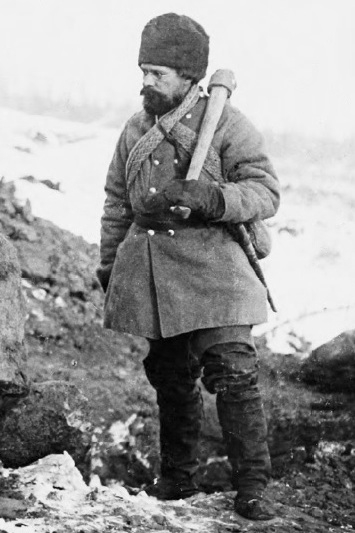

Alfred Otto Herz (14 October 1856 in Hoyerswerda, Silesia – 12 July 1905) was a German entomologist who specialised in Lepidoptera and Coleoptera. He was employed as a collector and preparator by the Otto Staudinger - Andreas Bang-Haas insect dealership in Dresden.

Otto Herz went on entomological expeditions to Transcaucasia, Buchara, Persia, Kamchatka, Yakutia (on a mammoth-collecting expedition), China, Korea, Japan, Hainan, and Siam partly funded by Nicholas Mikhailovich Romanoff who also purchased material directly from Herz or through Staundinger.

Many of the Lepidoptera collected by Herz were described by Sergei Alphéraky. His collected insects are in the Zoological Museum of the Russian Academy of Science (including the Romanoff insects) other than that sold elsewhere by the dealership.

== Tribute ==
The fish Pungtungia herzi Herzenstein, 1892 was named in honor of Herz, who collected the type specimen.

== Sources ==
- Kusnezov, N. J. 1906: [Herz, A. O.] Ann. Mus. Zool. Petersburg 11 I-V.
- Kusnezov, N. J. 1905: [Herz, A. O.] Russk. ent. obozr 5 311-312.
