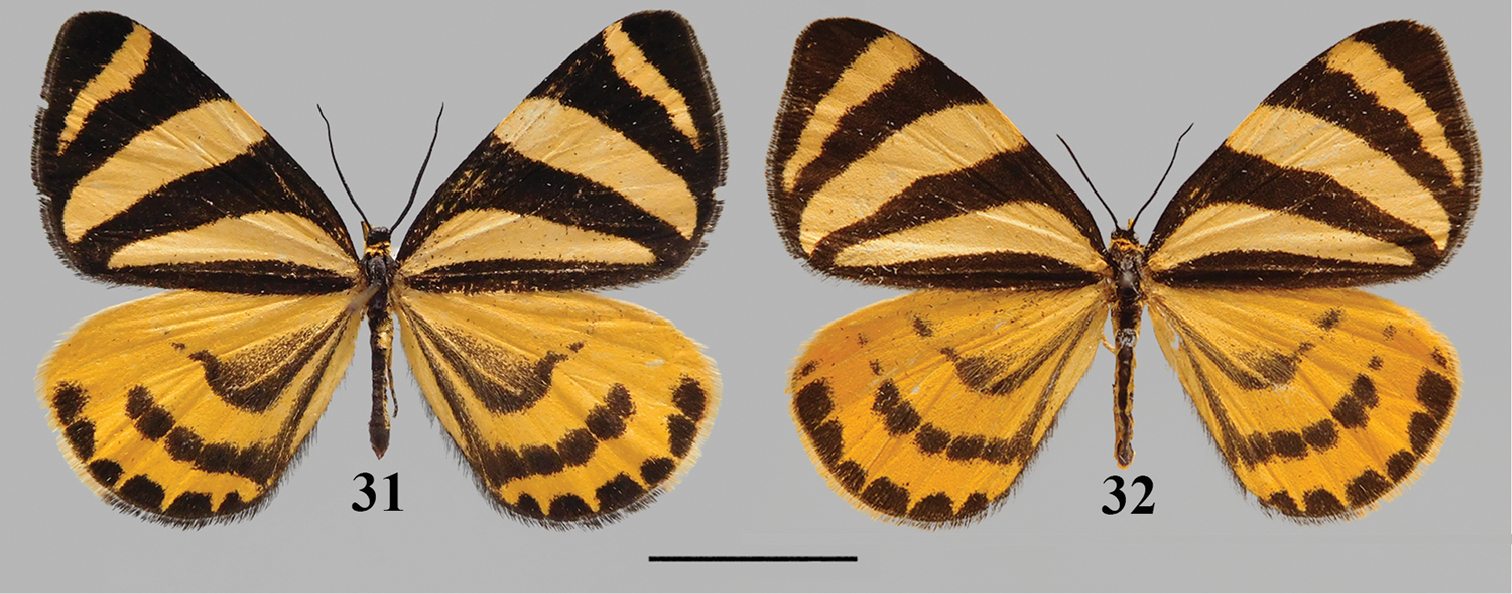

Scientific classification
- Kingdom: Animalia
- Phylum: Arthropoda
- Clade: Pancrustacea
- Class: Insecta
- Order: Lepidoptera
- Family: Epicopeiidae
- Genus: Deuveia; Minet, 2002
- Species: D. banghaasi

Binomial name
- Deuveia banghaasi (Hering, 1932)

Synonyms
- Amana banghaasi Hering, 1932

= Deuveia banghaasi =

Species of moth

Deuveia banghaasi is a moth in the family Epicopeiidae. It is found in central China.

The wingspan is 31–34 mm. Adults have been recorded on wing in June. It is a day-flying species.

== Etymology ==
The genus is named for Dr. Thierry Deuve (MNHN).
