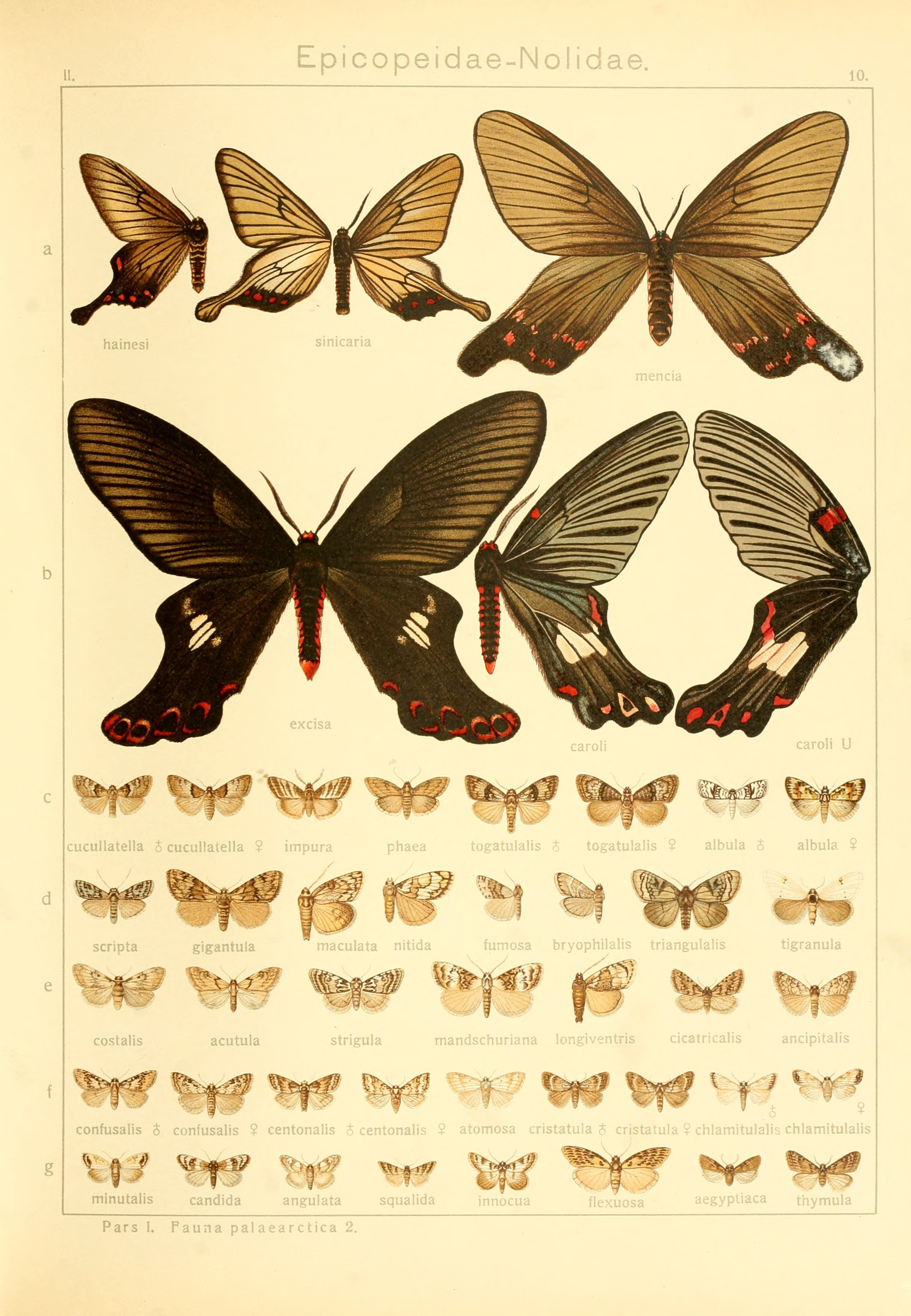
- Epicopeiidae in Seitz

Scientific classification
- Kingdom: Animalia
- Phylum: Arthropoda
- Clade: Pancrustacea
- Class: Insecta
- Order: Lepidoptera
- Superfamily: Geometroidea
- Family: Epicopeiidae; Swinhoe, 1892

Synonyms
- Schistomitrinae Inoue, 1982

= Epicopeiidae =

Family of moths

Epicopeiidae is a family of insects in the order Lepidoptera. They are known as oriental swallowtail moths as they closely resemble some oriental swallowtail butterflies (e.g. red-bodied swallowtails). Epicopeiidae have highly varied structure in regards to body size and wing shape. Epicopeiidaen wing patterns are involved in complicated mimicry rings.

== Genera ==
- Amana Walker, 1855
- Burmeia Minet, 2002
- Chatamla Moore, 1881
- Deuveia Minet, 2002
- Epicopeia Westwood, 1841
- Nossa Kirby, 1892
- Mimaporia Wei & Yen, 2017
- Parabraxas Leech, 1897
- Psychostrophia Butler, 1877
- Schistomitra Butler, 1881

== Former genera ==
- Epicopiopsis Grunberg, 1908
