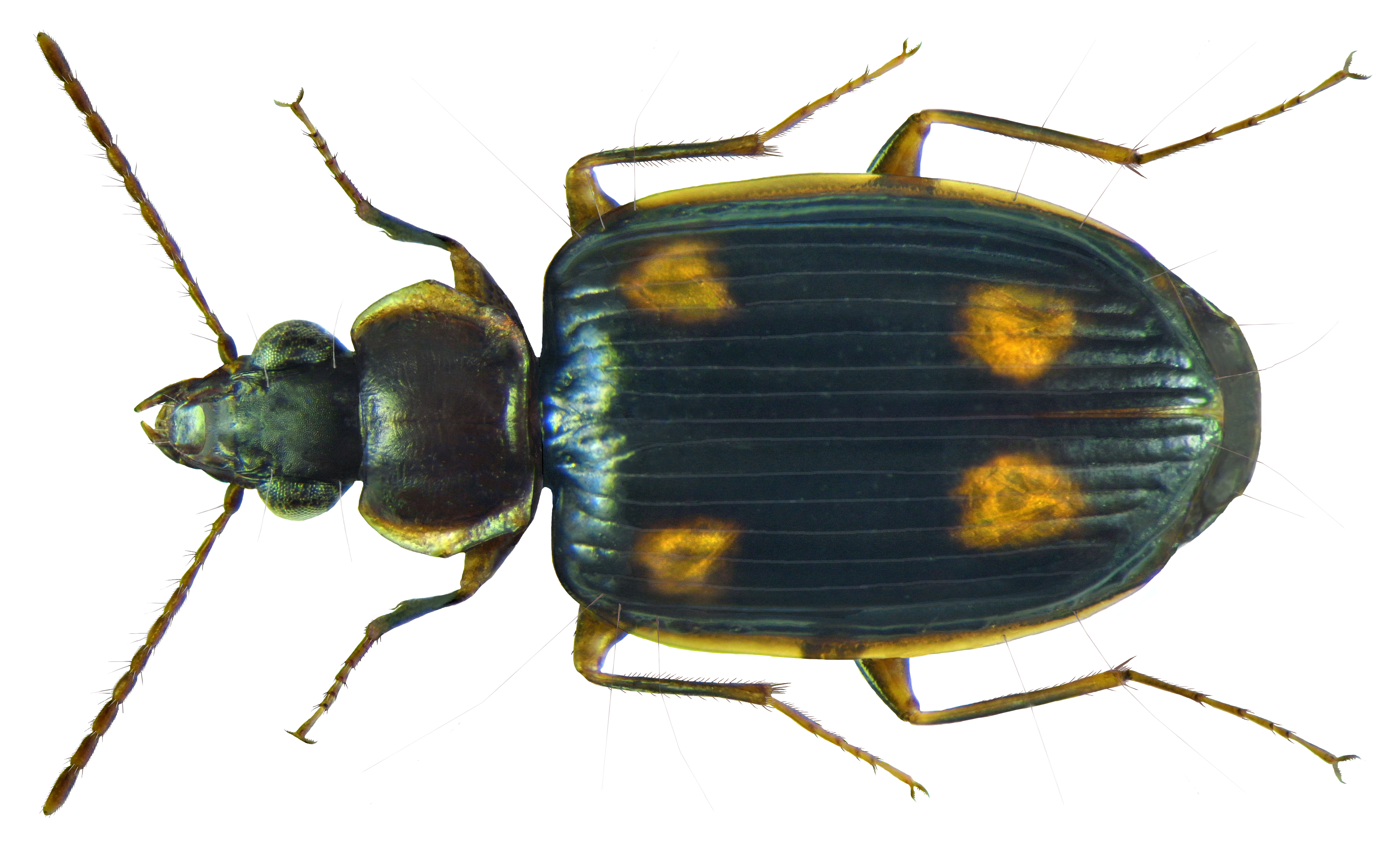

Scientific classification
- Domain: Eukaryota
- Kingdom: Animalia
- Phylum: Arthropoda
- Class: Insecta
- Order: Coleoptera
- Suborder: Adephaga
- Family: Carabidae
- Genus: Dolichoctis
- Species: D. rotundata

Binomial name
- Dolichoctis rotundata (Schmidt-Goebel, 1846)

= Dolichoctis rotundata =

Species of beetle

Dolichoctis rotundata is a species of beetle in the subfamily Lamiinae, that is endemic to Malaysia. The length of the species is 5.4 millimetres (0.21 in) long. It is black coloured with yellow dots on its wings. Adults are on wing from April to June.
