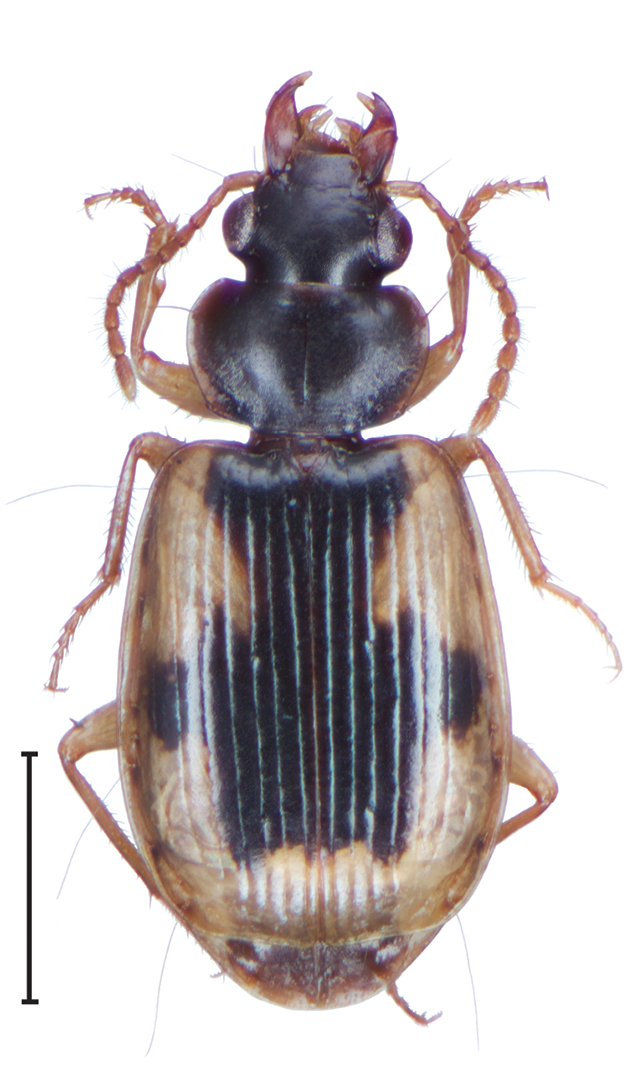
- Dromoceryx nigrofovealis

Scientific classification
- Kingdom: Animalia
- Phylum: Arthropoda
- Clade: Pancrustacea
- Class: Insecta
- Order: Coleoptera
- Suborder: Adephaga
- Family: Carabidae
- Subfamily: Lebiinae
- Tribe: Lebiini
- Subtribe: Dromiusina
- Genus: Dromoceryx; Schmidt-Goebel, 1846

= Dromoceryx =

Genus of beetles

Dromoceryx is a genus in the beetle family Carabidae. There are at least four described species in Dromoceryx.

== Species ==
These four species belong to the genus Dromoceryx:

- Dromoceryx dorsalis Schmidt-Goebel, 1846 (Myanmar and Vietnam)
- Dromoceryx flavocircumdatus Mateu, 1984 (India)
- Dromoceryx magnus Mateu, 1984 (India)
- Dromoceryx nigrofovealis Hunting & Yang, 2018 (Taiwan)
