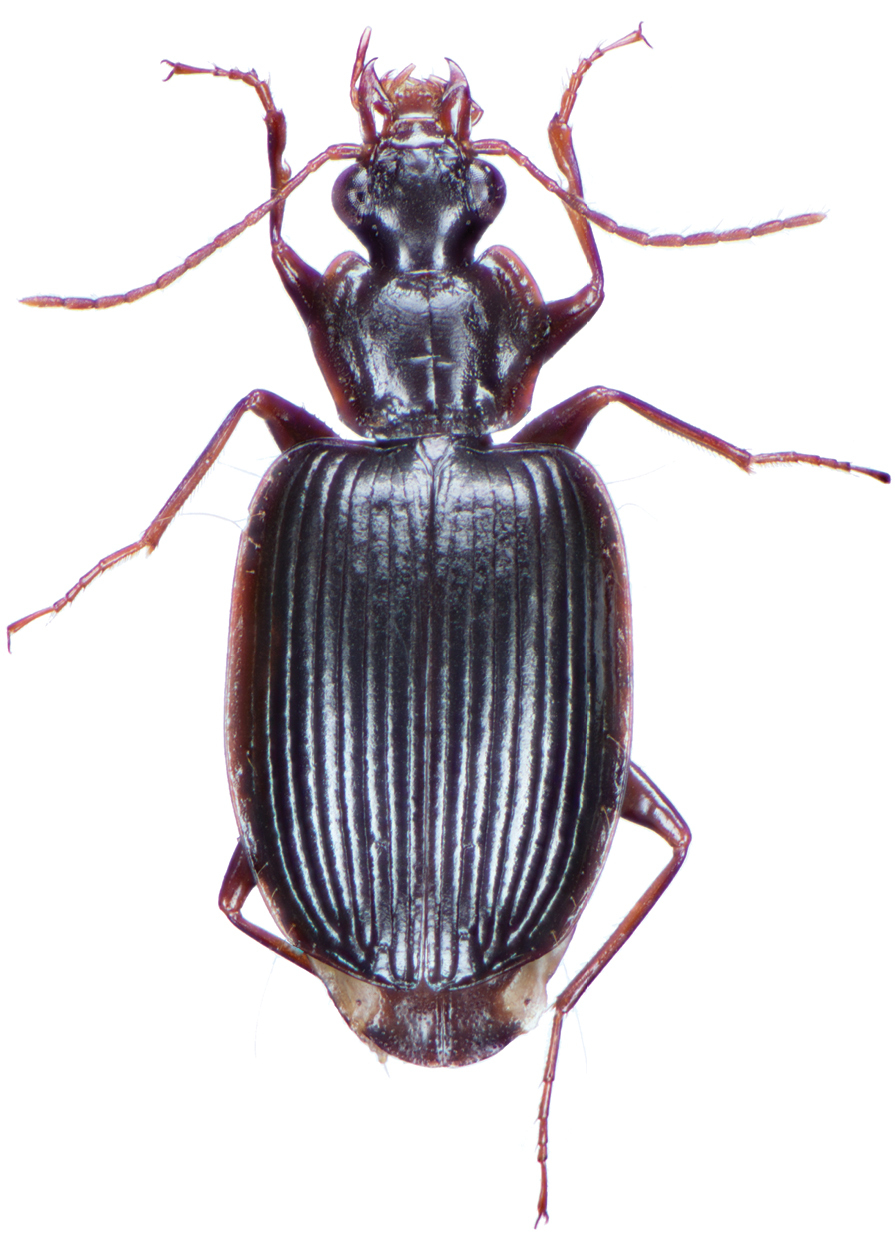
- Mochtherus luctuosus

Scientific classification
- Kingdom: Animalia
- Phylum: Arthropoda
- Class: Insecta
- Order: Coleoptera
- Suborder: Adephaga
- Family: Carabidae
- Subfamily: Lebiinae
- Tribe: Lebiini
- Genus: Mochtherus; Schmidt-Goebel, 1846

= Mochtherus =

Genus of beetles

Mochtherus is a genus in the beetle family Carabidae. There are about 11 described species in Mochtherus.

== Species ==
These 11 species belong to the genus Mochtherus:

- Mochtherus asemus Andrewes, 1924 (Indonesia)
- Mochtherus dentatus Baehr, 2016 (Indonesia)
- Mochtherus kelantanensis Kirschenhofer, 1999
- Mochtherus latithorax Jedlicka, 1935 (Philippines)
- Mochtherus longipennis Jedlicka, 1935 (Philippines)
- Mochtherus luctuosus Putzeys, 1875 (South Korea, Japan, and Taiwan)
- Mochtherus magnus Andrewes, 1930 (Malaysia, Singapore, and Indonesia)
- Mochtherus obscurabasis Hunting & Yang, 2019 (Taiwan)
- Mochtherus obscurus (Sloane, 1907) (Indonesia, New Guinea, and Australia)
- Mochtherus sulawesiensis Kirschenhofer, 2010 (Indonesia)
- Mochtherus tetraspilotus (W.S.MacLeay, 1825) (East and Southeast Asia, Australia)
