= Carabus kalabi =

Scientific classification
- Domain: Eukaryota
- Kingdom: Animalia
- Phylum: Arthropoda
- Class: Insecta
- Order: Coleoptera
- Suborder: Adephaga
- Family: Carabidae
- Genus: Carabus
- Species: C. kalabi

Binomial name
- Carabus kalabi Deuve, 1990

Species of beetle

Carabus kalabi is a species of beetle from family Carabidae. The species are black coloured.
