= Trechus damchungensis =

Scientific classification
- Kingdom: Animalia
- Phylum: Arthropoda
- Clade: Pancrustacea
- Class: Insecta
- Order: Coleoptera
- Suborder: Adephaga
- Family: Carabidae
- Genus: Trechus
- Species: T. damchungensis

Binomial name
- Trechus damchungensis Deuve, 1998

Species of beetle

Trechus damchungensis is a species of ground beetle in the subfamily Trechinae. It was described by Thierry Deuve in 1998.
