= Tetragonoderus rhombophorus =

Scientific classification
- Domain: Eukaryota
- Kingdom: Animalia
- Phylum: Arthropoda
- Class: Insecta
- Order: Coleoptera
- Suborder: Adephaga
- Family: Carabidae
- Genus: Tetragonoderus
- Species: T. rhombophorus

Binomial name
- Tetragonoderus rhombophorus Schmidt-Goebel, 1846

Species of beetle

Tetragonoderus rhombophorus is a species of beetle in the family Carabidae. It was described by Schmidt-Goebel in 1846.
