= Cimmeritodes =

Scientific classification
- Domain: Eukaryota
- Kingdom: Animalia
- Phylum: Arthropoda
- Class: Insecta
- Order: Coleoptera
- Suborder: Adephaga
- Family: Carabidae
- Subfamily: Trechinae
- Tribe: Trechini
- Genus: Cimmeritodes; Deuve, 1996

Subgenera
- Cimmeritodes Deuve, 1996; Dianocimmerites Deuve & Tian, 2016; Shimenrites Deuve & Tian, 2017; Xiangcimmerites Deuve & Tian, 2016; Zhecimmerites Deuve & Tian, 2015

Genus of beetles

Cimmeritodes is a genus in the beetle family Carabidae. There are about six described species in Cimmeritodes, found in China.

== Species ==
These six species belong to the genus Cimmeritodes:

- Cimmeritodes crassifemoralis Deuve & Tian, 2016
- Cimmeritodes huangi (Deuve, 1996)
- Cimmeritodes parvus Tian & Li, 2016
- Cimmeritodes shimenensis Deuve & Tian, 2017
- Cimmeritodes zhejiangensis Deuve & Tian, 2015
- Cimmeritodes zhongfangensis Deuve & Tian, 2016
