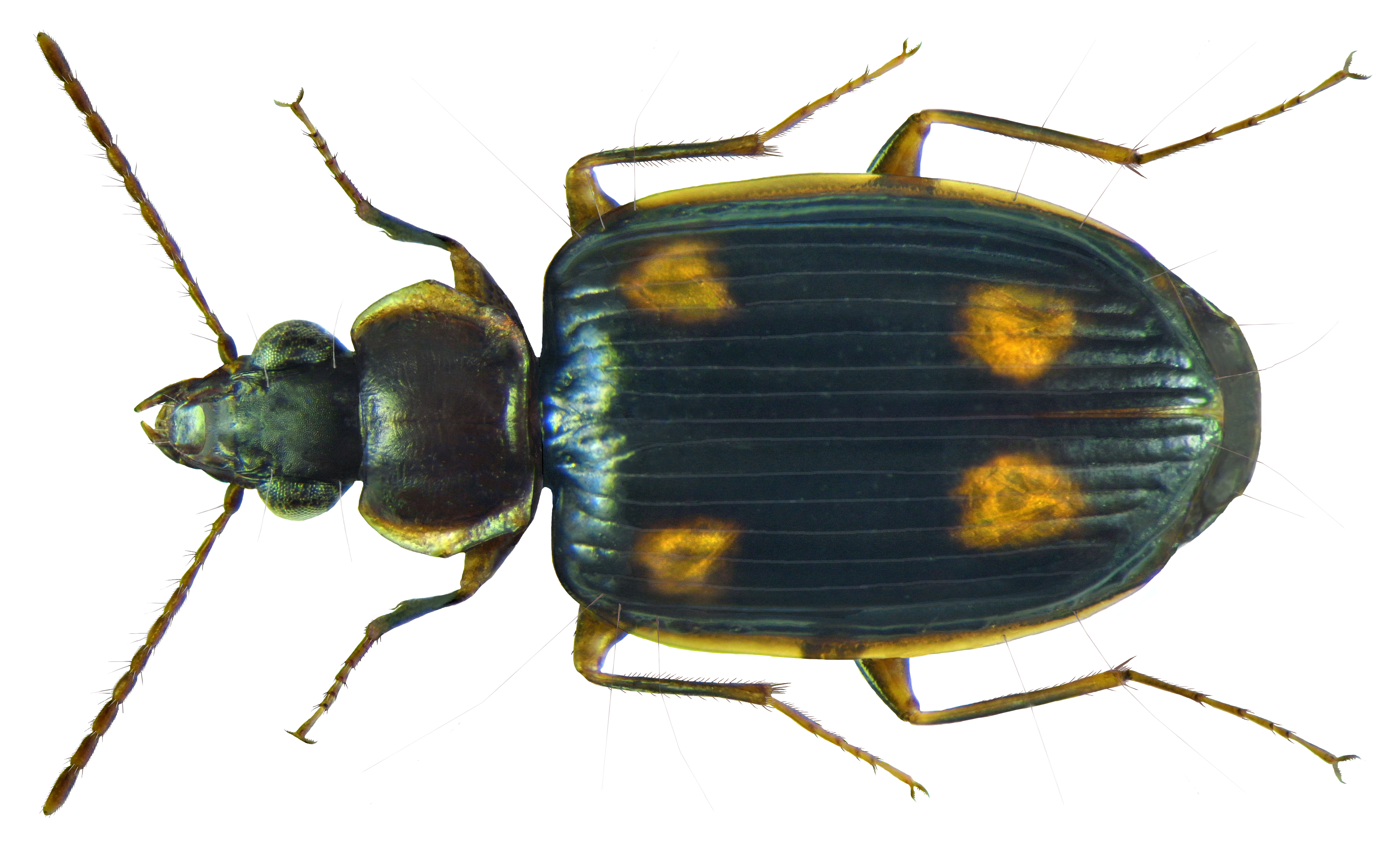
- Dolichoctis rotundata

Scientific classification
- Kingdom: Animalia
- Phylum: Arthropoda
- Class: Insecta
- Order: Coleoptera
- Suborder: Adephaga
- Family: Carabidae
- Subfamily: Lebiinae
- Tribe: Lebiini
- Genus: Dolichoctis; Schmidt-Goebel, 1846

Subgenera
- Dolichoctis Schmidt-Goebel, 1846; Papuadolichoctis Baehr, 1999; Spinidolichoctis Baehr, 1999

= Dolichoctis =

Genus of beetles

Dolichoctis is a genus in the beetle family Carabidae. There are more than 130 described species in Dolichoctis.

== Species ==
These 132 species belong to the genus Dolichoctis:

- Dolichoctis aculeata Chaudoir, 1870 (Indonesia, New Guinea, Papua, Australia)
- Dolichoctis aculeoides Baehr, 1999 (New Guinea and Papua)
- Dolichoctis anceps Andrewes, 1929 (Indonesia)
- Dolichoctis andamanica Baehr, 2013 (India)
- Dolichoctis andrewesi Jedlicka, 1934 (Philippines)
- Dolichoctis angulicollis Chaudoir, 1870 (Southeast Asia)
- Dolichoctis angustemaculata Baehr, 1999 (Indonesia and New Guinea)
- Dolichoctis angusticollis Bates, 1892 (Nepal, Myanmar, Thailand)
- Dolichoctis aruensis Baehr, 2015 (Indonesia)
- Dolichoctis aterrima Baehr, 2013 (New Guinea and Papua)
- Dolichoctis avicapitis Baehr, 1999 (Indonesia and New Guinea)
- Dolichoctis badiadorsis Hunting & Yang, 2019 (Taiwan)
- Dolichoctis baumi Jedlicka, 1955 (Malaysia)
- Dolichoctis biak Baehr, 1999 (Indonesia and New Guinea)
- Dolichoctis bicolor Baehr, 1999 (Indonesia and New Guinea)
- Dolichoctis bifasciata Andrewes, 1931 (Indonesia and Borneo)
- Dolichoctis bisetosa Baehr, 1999 (Indonesia and New Guinea)
- Dolichoctis bisetosiceps Baehr, 2013 (New Guinea and Papua)
- Dolichoctis castanea Darlington, 1968 (New Guinea and Papua)
- Dolichoctis chitra Andrewes, 1923 (Sri Lanka)
- Dolichoctis constricticollis Andrewes, 1931 (Malaysia, Indonesia, Borneo)
- Dolichoctis convexa Andrewes, 1923 (India)
- Dolichoctis curvicollis Baehr, 2013 (Vietnam)
- Dolichoctis cylindripennis Baehr, 2013 (New Guinea and Papua)
- Dolichoctis darlingtoni Baehr, 1999 (Indonesia and New Guinea)
- Dolichoctis dentata Darlington, 1968 (Indonesia and New Guinea)
- Dolichoctis dentifera Baehr, 2013 (Indonesia and Borneo)
- Dolichoctis depokensis Louwerens, 1951 (Indonesia)
- Dolichoctis dilatata Hunting & Yang, 2019 (Taiwan)
- Dolichoctis distorta Darlington, 1968 (New Guinea and Papua)
- Dolichoctis divisa Darlington, 1968 (Indonesia and New Guinea)
- Dolichoctis elegans Andrewes, 1929 (Indonesia)
- Dolichoctis elongata Baehr, 1999 (Indonesia, New Guinea, Papua)
- Dolichoctis erythrospinosa Baehr, 2006
- Dolichoctis exigua Baehr, 1999 (Indonesia and New Guinea)
- Dolichoctis expansicollis Bates, 1892 (China and Myanmar)
- Dolichoctis falciplaga Baehr, 2013 (Laos and Malaysia)
- Dolichoctis fasciola Bates, 1886 (Sri Lanka)
- Dolichoctis figurata Andrewes, 1929 (Indonesia)
- Dolichoctis gilvipes (Dejean, 1831) (Philippines)
- Dolichoctis glabripennis Baehr, 2003 (Indonesia and New Guinea)
- Dolichoctis globosa Andrewes, 1930 (Indonesia)
- Dolichoctis goaensis Kirschenhofer, 2012 (India)
- Dolichoctis goniodera Bates, 1886 (Sri Lanka)
- Dolichoctis huon Darlington, 1968 (New Guinea and Papua)
- Dolichoctis immaculata (L.Redtenbacher, 1868) (Indonesia)
- Dolichoctis incerta Bates, 1892 (Myanmar)
- Dolichoctis iridea Bates, 1892 (India, Myanmar, Thailand)
- Dolichoctis iridescens Louwerens, 1952 (Indonesia)
- Dolichoctis ivimkae Baehr, 2013 (New Guinea and Papua)
- Dolichoctis jacobsoni Andrewes, 1929 (Malaysia and Indonesia)
- Dolichoctis jakli Baehr, 2013 (Indonesia)
- Dolichoctis keiana Baehr, 1999 (Indonesia)
- Dolichoctis kitchingi Baehr, 2013 (Malaysia, Indonesia, Borneo)
- Dolichoctis kjellanderi Louwerens, 1964 (Indonesia and Borneo)
- Dolichoctis kulti Jedlicka, 1964 (Philippines)
- Dolichoctis lackneri Baehr, 2013 (Indonesia and New Guinea)
- Dolichoctis latibasis Baehr, 2013 (New Guinea and Papua)
- Dolichoctis laticollis Baehr, 1999 (Indonesia and New Guinea)
- Dolichoctis latithorax Louwerens, 1956 (Indonesia)
- Dolichoctis lis Andrewes, 1929 (Indonesia)
- Dolichoctis longicornis Baehr, 1999 (Indonesia and New Guinea)
- Dolichoctis ludewigi Baehr, 2017 (Papua)
- Dolichoctis lunigera Andrewes, 1926 (Indonesia)
- Dolichoctis maculipennis Louwerens, 1958 (Indonesia)
- Dolichoctis major Baehr, 1999 (Indonesia and New Guinea)
- Dolichoctis malayica Baehr, 2013 (Thailand and Malaysia)
- Dolichoctis malickyi Baehr, 2013 (Myanmar and Thailand)
- Dolichoctis marginifer (Walker, 1858) (Sri Lanka and India)
- Dolichoctis mehli Baehr, 2013 (Indonesia)
- Dolichoctis microdera Andrewes, 1930 (Indonesia and Borneo)
- Dolichoctis multistriata Andrewes, 1929 (Indonesia)
- Dolichoctis munda Baehr, 2013 (Philippines)
- Dolichoctis negrosensis Baehr, 2013 (Philippines)
- Dolichoctis nigricauda Baehr, 2007 (Indonesia and New Guinea)
- Dolichoctis novaeirlandiae Baehr, 2003 (New Guinea)
- Dolichoctis obliqueplagiata Baehr, 2013 (Indonesia)
- Dolichoctis ocularis Baehr, 2013 (New Guinea and Papua)
- Dolichoctis ophthalmica Baehr, 1999 (Indonesia and New Guinea)
- Dolichoctis opima Andrewes, 1929 (Indonesia)
- Dolichoctis ornata Baehr, 2013 (Indonesia, Borneo, Philippines)
- Dolichoctis ovipennis Baehr, 2015 (New Guinea and Papua)
- Dolichoctis pahangensis Kirschenhofer, 2010 (Malaysia)
- Dolichoctis pallipes Louwerens, 1964 (Indonesia and Borneo)
- Dolichoctis paradentata Baehr, 2006
- Dolichoctis parallelipennis Baehr, 2015 (New Guinea and Papua)
- Dolichoctis parvicollis Chaudoir, 1870 (Indonesia and Borneo)
- Dolichoctis pedestris Darlington, 1970 (Indonesia)
- Dolichoctis philippinensis Jedlicka, 1934 (Philippines)
- Dolichoctis picea Baehr, 2006
- Dolichoctis picescens Baehr, 2007 (Australia)
- Dolichoctis picta Baehr, 2013 (Indonesia and Borneo)
- Dolichoctis platycollis Baehr, 2013 (Indonesia)
- Dolichoctis polita Darlington, 1968 (New Guinea and Papua)
- Dolichoctis polygramma Andrewes, 1930 (Malaysia, Indonesia, Borneo)
- Dolichoctis pumila Andrewes, 1933 (Indonesia)
- Dolichoctis punctipennis Jedlicka, 1964 (Philippines)
- Dolichoctis quadratipennis Andrewes, 1929 (Malaysia and Indonesia)
- Dolichoctis riedeli Baehr, 1999 (Indonesia and New Guinea)
- Dolichoctis rotundata (Schmidt-Goebel, 1846) (East Asia, Indomalaya)
- Dolichoctis ruficollis Baehr, 2013 (Philippines)
- Dolichoctis rugaticollis Baehr, 2013 (Indonesia)
- Dolichoctis rutilipennis Bates, 1892 (Myanmar)
- Dolichoctis salomona Baehr, 1999 (the Solomon Islands)
- Dolichoctis sikkimensis Baehr, 2013 (Nepal and India)
- Dolichoctis sinuaticollis Baehr, 2007 (Australia)
- Dolichoctis skalei Baehr, 2015 (Thailand)
- Dolichoctis spadicea Baehr, 2013 (Philippines)
- Dolichoctis spatulata Baehr, 2013 (Thailand)
- Dolichoctis spinipennis Chaudoir, 1870 (Indonesia)
- Dolichoctis spinosa Darlington, 1968 (Indonesia and New Guinea)
- Dolichoctis spinosissima Baehr, 2013 (Nepal and India)
- Dolichoctis stevensi Baehr, 2013 (India and Myanmar)
- Dolichoctis striata Schmidt-Goebel, 1846 (Myanmar)
- Dolichoctis subquadrata Darlington, 1968 (Indonesia and New Guinea)
- Dolichoctis subrotunda Darlington, 1968 (Indonesia, New Guinea, Australia)
- Dolichoctis sulcicollis Baehr, 1999 (Indonesia and New Guinea)
- Dolichoctis suturalis Darlington, 1968 (Indonesia and New Guinea)
- Dolichoctis taiwanensis Baehr, 2013 (Taiwan)
- Dolichoctis tenuilimbata Oberthür, 1883 (Indonesia)
- Dolichoctis tetracolon Chaudoir, 1870 (Indomalaya)
- Dolichoctis tetrastigma Chaudoir, 1870 (Indonesia, Philippines, Australia)
- Dolichoctis tjambaensis Louwerens, 1958 (Indonesia)
- Dolichoctis torquata Andrewes, 1930 (Indonesia)
- Dolichoctis ullrichi Baehr, 1999 (New Guinea and Papua)
- Dolichoctis unicolor Emden, 1937 (Indonesia)
- Dolichoctis unidentata Baehr, 2013 (India)
- Dolichoctis vietnamensis Baehr, 2013 (Vietnam)
- Dolichoctis vitticollis Bates, 1886 (Sri Lanka)
- Dolichoctis vixstriata Baehr, 1999 (Indonesia and New Guinea)
- Dolichoctis weigeli Baehr, 2006
- Dolichoctis yamdenae Baehr, 2015 (Indonesia)
