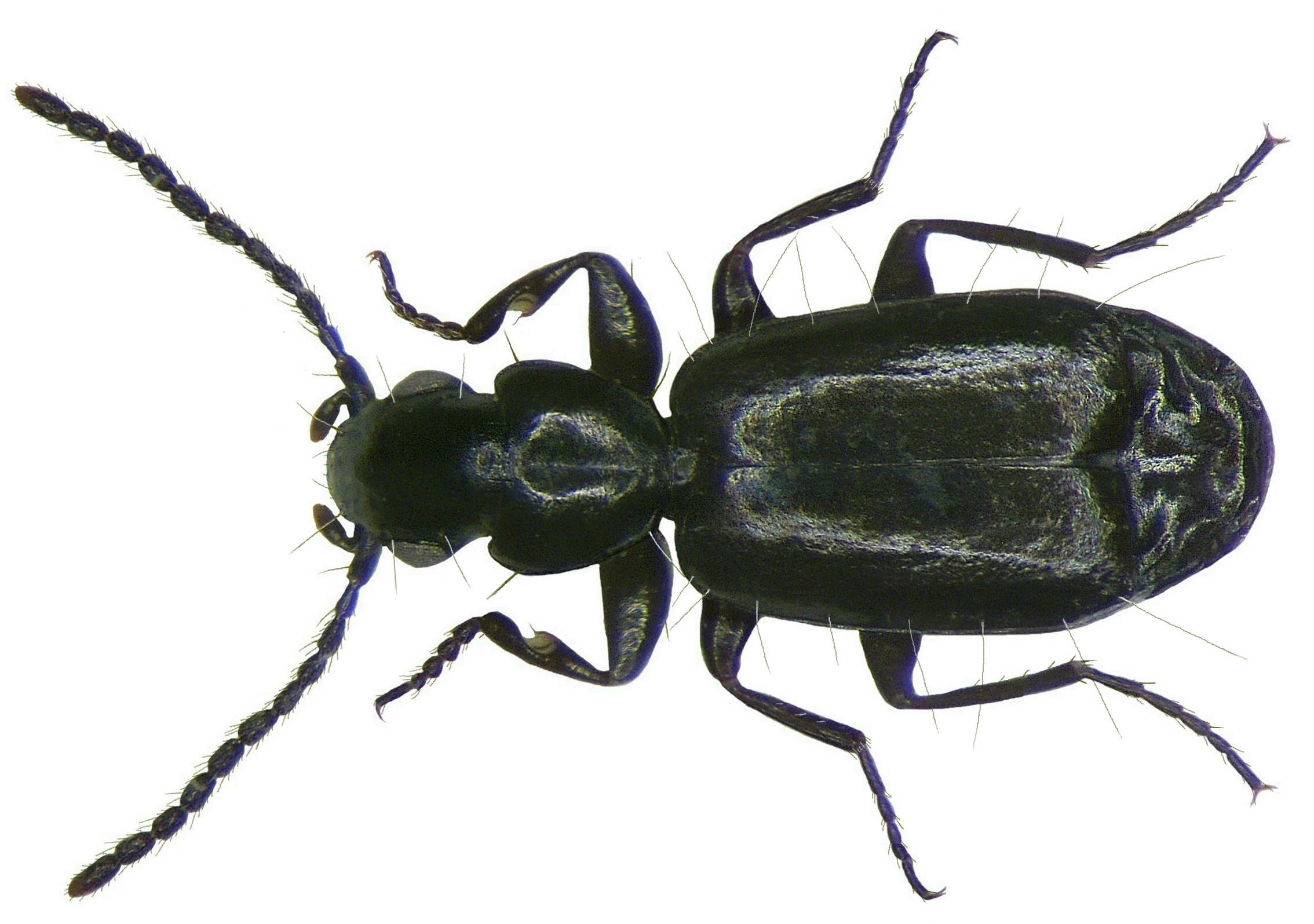
- Microlestes maurus

Scientific classification
- Kingdom: Animalia
- Phylum: Arthropoda
- Clade: Pancrustacea
- Class: Insecta
- Order: Coleoptera
- Suborder: Adephaga
- Family: Carabidae
- Subfamily: Lebiinae
- Tribe: Lebiini
- Genus: Microlestes; Schmidt-Goebel, 1846

= Microlestes =

Genus of beetles

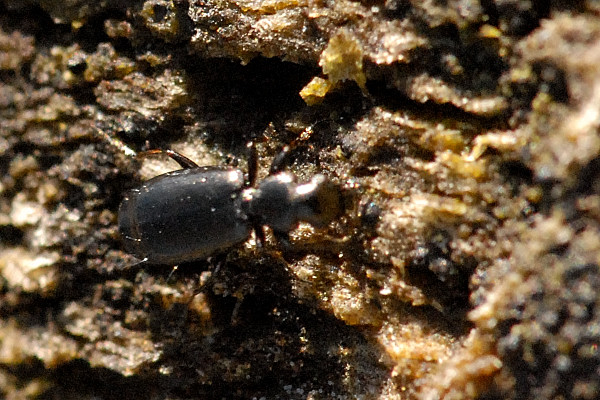
Masoreus wetterhallii

Microlestes is a genus of ground beetle native to the Afro-tropical region, the Palearctic (including Europe), the Near East, North Africa, and the Oriental region.

== Species ==
These 127 species belong to the genus Microlestes:

- Microlestes abeillei (Brisout de Barneville, 1885)
- Microlestes aditi Mateu, 1979
- Microlestes aenigmaticus Mateu, 1963
- Microlestes afer Mateu, 1963
- Microlestes africanus Mateu, 1959
- Microlestes aljezurensis Ortuño & Oliveira, 2012
- Microlestes andrewesi Mateu, 1979
- Microlestes angusteforcipatus Antoine, 1941
- Microlestes ankaratrae Jeannel, 1949
- Microlestes annamensis (Bates, 1889)
- Microlestes apterus Holdhaus, 1904
- Microlestes asiaticus Mateu, 1971
- Microlestes australis Mateu, 1963
- Microlestes bacchusi Mateu, 1979
- Microlestes badulini Komarov, 1989
- Microlestes balli Mateu, 1974
- Microlestes basilewskyi Mateu, 1963
- Microlestes baudii (Fairmaire, 1892)
- Microlestes bipunctatus Mateu, 1963
- Microlestes birmanicus Mateu, 1959
- Microlestes bomansi Mateu, 1963
- Microlestes brahma Mateu, 1960
- Microlestes brevilobus Lindroth, 1969
- Microlestes brunneus Mateu, 1963
- Microlestes capensis Motschulsky, 1864
- Microlestes castaneus Mateu, 1963
- Microlestes celebensis Mateu, 1959
- Microlestes coiffaiti Mateu, 1956
- Microlestes collarti Mateu, 1963
- Microlestes conspicuus Mateu, 1963
- Microlestes corticalis (L.Dufour, 1820)
- Microlestes creticus Holdhaus, 1912
- Microlestes curtatus Darlington, 1968
- Microlestes curtipennis (Casey, 1920)
- Microlestes decellei Mateu, 1968
- Microlestes demessus Andrewes, 1923
- Microlestes dentatus Mateu, 1963
- Microlestes discoidalis (Fairmaire, 1892)
- Microlestes espanoli Jeanne, 1985
- Microlestes exilis Schmidt-Goebel, 1846
- Microlestes fissuralis (Reitter, 1901)
- Microlestes flavipes Motschulsky, 1860
- Microlestes freyi Mateu, 1963
- Microlestes fulvibasis (Reitter, 1901)
- Microlestes fulvus Alfieri, 1976
- Microlestes gallicus Holdhaus, 1912
- Microlestes gharuhanus Mateu, 1976
- Microlestes glabrellus (Reitter, 1901)
- Microlestes golvani Mateu, 1961
- Microlestes gomerensis Lindberg, 1953
- Microlestes gracilicornis Holdhaus, 1912
- Microlestes grandis Mateu, 1963
- Microlestes halffteri Mateu, 1974
- Microlestes holdhausi Gridelli, 1930
- Microlestes ibericus Holdhaus, 1912
- Microlestes ignotus Mateu, 1971
- Microlestes inconspicuus Schmidt-Goebel, 1846
- Microlestes indicus Mateu, 1959
- Microlestes infuscatus Motschulsky, 1860
- Microlestes iranicus Mateu, 1984
- Microlestes irregularis Mateu, 1963
- Microlestes kali Mateu, 1960
- Microlestes kochi Mateu, 1963
- Microlestes leleupi Mateu, 1963
- Microlestes levipennis (Lucas, 1846)
- Microlestes lindrothi Mateu, 1995
- Microlestes linearis (LeConte, 1851)
- Microlestes lucidus (LeConte, 1851)
- Microlestes luctuosus Holdhaus in Apfelbeck, 1904
- Microlestes luridus Mateu, 1959
- Microlestes madecassus Alluaud, 1935
- Microlestes maindroni Mateu, 1959
- Microlestes major Lindroth, 1969
- Microlestes maruta Mateu, 1979
- Microlestes mauritanicus (Lucas, 1846)
- Microlestes maurus (Sturm, 1827)
- Microlestes mayidiensis Mateu, 1963
- Microlestes mena Mateu, 1979
- Microlestes minor Mateu, 1960
- Microlestes minutulus (Goeze, 1777)
- Microlestes mirei Mateu, 1953
- Microlestes monodi Mateu, 1963
- Microlestes monstruosus Mateu, 1963
- Microlestes montanellus Mateu, 1971
- Microlestes naini Jedlicka, 1964
- Microlestes nanus Mateu, 1953
- Microlestes negrei Mateu, 1959
- Microlestes negrita (Wollaston, 1854)
- Microlestes nigrinus (Mannerheim, 1843)
- Microlestes nilgiricus Mateu, 1979
- Microlestes notabilis Mateu, 1963
- Microlestes numidicus Normand, 1941
- Microlestes oberthuri Mateu, 1959
- Microlestes orientalis Mateu, 1956
- Microlestes orophilus Mateu, 1963
- Microlestes parvati Mateu, 1971
- Microlestes pauliani Mateu, 1963
- Microlestes persicus Holdhaus, 1912
- Microlestes phenax Antoine, 1941
- Microlestes plagiatus (Duftschmid, 1812)
- Microlestes poeyi Jacquelin du Val, 1857
- Microlestes politulus (Reitter, 1901)
- Microlestes pusio (LeConte, 1863)
- Microlestes rama Mateu, 1971
- Microlestes reitteri Holdhaus, 1912
- Microlestes repandus Mateu, 1960
- Microlestes royi Mateu, 1963
- Microlestes rudebecki Mateu, 1963
- Microlestes sahelianus Mateu, 1959
- Microlestes sahlbergi Holdhaus, 1912
- Microlestes saigonicus Mateu, 1959
- Microlestes schroederi Holdhaus, 1912
- Microlestes seladon Holdhaus, 1912
- Microlestes sinaiticus Alfieri, 1976
- Microlestes siva Mateu, 1959
- Microlestes solidus Mateu, 1960
- Microlestes syriacus (Brisout de Barneville, 1885)
- Microlestes tehuantepec Mateu, 1974
- Microlestes tenuis Mateu, 1984
- Microlestes testaceus Mateu, 1959
- Microlestes theodoridesi Mateu, 1961
- Microlestes villiersi Mateu, 1959
- Microlestes vittatus (Motschulsky, 1860)
- Microlestes vittipennis J.Sahlberg, 1908
- Microlestes xanthopus (Bates, 1886)
- Microlestes yunnanicus Mateu, 1961
- Microlestes zambezianus Mateu, 1960
