= Peliocypas =

Scientific classification
- Kingdom: Animalia
- Phylum: Arthropoda
- Class: Insecta
- Order: Coleoptera
- Suborder: Adephaga
- Family: Carabidae
- Subfamily: Lebiinae
- Tribe: Lebiini
- Subtribe: Peliocypadina
- Genus: Peliocypas; Schmidt-Goebel, 1846

Genus of beetles

Peliocypas is a genus in the beetle family Carabidae. There are more than 60 described species in Peliocypas.

== Species ==
These 69 species belong to the genus Peliocypas:

- Peliocypas alternans Jeannel, 1949 (Madagascar)
- Peliocypas andrewesi (Jedlicka, 1932) (Taiwan)
- Peliocypas angulicollis (Motschulsky, 1864) (Africa)
- Peliocypas angulosus Jeannel, 1949 (Madagascar)
- Peliocypas annamensis (Bates, 1889) (India, Myanmar, Thailand, Vietnam)
- Peliocypas apicalis (Louwerens, 1953) (Indonesia)
- Peliocypas assamensis (Jedlicka, 1964) (India)
- Peliocypas bechynei Basilewsky, 1956 (Guinea)
- Peliocypas beesoni (Andrewes, 1933) (India)
- Peliocypas brahmaputra (Jedlicka, 1964) (India)
- Peliocypas catenatus (Bates, 1886) (Sri Lanka)
- Peliocypas chaudoiri Barker, 1919 (South Africa)
- Peliocypas chinensis (Jedlicka, 1960) (China)
- Peliocypas cordicollis (Bates, 1889) (China and Vietnam)
- Peliocypas cylindricollis Jeannel, 1949 (Madagascar)
- Peliocypas debilis (LaFerté-Sénectère, 1849) (Africa)
- Peliocypas dissimilis (Klug, 1833) (Madagascar)
- Peliocypas drescheri (Andrewes, 1937) (Indonesia)
- Peliocypas eberti (Jedlicka, 1965) (Nepal)
- Peliocypas euproctoides (Bates, 1886) (Sri Lanka and India)
- Peliocypas fulgureus (Andrewes, 1930) (Malaysia, Singapore, Indonesia)
- Peliocypas fuscus (Motschulsky, 1860) (Sri Lanka)
- Peliocypas gardneri (Andrewes, 1933) (India)
- Peliocypas hamatus Schmidt-Goebel, 1846 (India, Myanmar, Indonesia, Borneo)
- Peliocypas himalayicus (Andrewes, 1923) (Nepal and India)
- Peliocypas horni (Jedlicka, 1932) (Taiwan)
- Peliocypas inflaticeps (Burgeon, 1937) (Democratic Republic of the Congo)
- Peliocypas inornatus (Andrewes, 1929) (Indonesia)
- Peliocypas insularis Fairmaire, 1897 (Madagascar)
- Peliocypas intermedius (Bates, 1886) (Sri Lanka)
- Peliocypas leptosomus (Andrewes, 1937) (Indonesia)
- Peliocypas levipennis (Andrewes, 1936) (Sri Lanka)
- Peliocypas litteratus (Andrewes, 1929) (Indonesia)
- Peliocypas longulus Jeannel, 1949 (Madagascar)
- Peliocypas luridus Schmidt-Goebel, 1846 (Taiwan, Indomalaya)
- Peliocypas macellus (Andrewes, 1923) (India)
- Peliocypas melleus (Bates, 1886) (Sri Lanka)
- Peliocypas miwai (Jedlicka, 1940) (South Korea and Japan)
- Peliocypas nagatomii (Jedlicka, 1966) (Thailand)
- Peliocypas natalensis (Chaudoir, 1876) (South Africa)
- Peliocypas obenbergeri (Jedlicka, 1934) (Indonesia and Borneo)
- Peliocypas ochroides (Andrewes, 1933) (India)
- Peliocypas olemartini (Kirschenhofer, 1986) (China)
- Peliocypas oryctus (Andrewes, 1936) (Sri Lanka)
- Peliocypas pahangensis (Kirschenhofer, 2011) (Malaysia)
- Peliocypas pallidus (Chaudoir, 1878) (Tanzania)
- Peliocypas papua Darlington, 1968 (New Guinea)
- Peliocypas probsti (Kirschenhofer, 1994) (Nepal)
- Peliocypas psilus (Andrewes, 1923) (India)
- Peliocypas repandens (Walker, 1859) (Sri Lanka)
- Peliocypas sanatus (Jedlicka, 1934) (China and Philippines)
- Peliocypas schereri (Jedlicka, 1964) (India)
- Peliocypas sicardi Jeannel, 1949 (Madagascar)
- Peliocypas signatus (Jedlicka, 1934) (Philippines)
- Peliocypas signifer Schmidt-Goebel, 1846 (Indomalaya)
- Peliocypas staneki (Jedlicka, 1934) (Philippines)
- Peliocypas stepaneki (Jedlicka, 1934) (Philippines)
- Peliocypas suensoni (Kirschenhofer, 1986) (China)
- Peliocypas suturalis Schmidt-Goebel, 1846 (Pakistan, India, Myanmar)
- Peliocypas taborskyi (Jedlicka, 1934) (Philippines)
- Peliocypas tagliaferrii Facchini & Susini, 2011 (Gabon)
- Peliocypas tomentosus (Jedlicka, 1934) (Philippines)
- Peliocypas trigonus (Andrewes, 1936) (Sri Lanka)
- Peliocypas unicolor (Jedlicka, 1934) (Philippines)
- Peliocypas uniformis (Fairmaire, 1888) (Vietnam)
- Peliocypas vietnamensis (Kirschenhofer, 1994) (Vietnam)
- Peliocypas villiersi (Burgeon, 1942) (Cameroon)
- Peliocypas vimmeri (Jedlicka, 1934) (Philippines)
- Peliocypas vittiger (Andrewes, 1929) (Indonesia)
