= Celaenephes =

Scientific classification
- Kingdom: Animalia
- Phylum: Arthropoda
- Class: Insecta
- Order: Coleoptera
- Suborder: Adephaga
- Family: Carabidae
- Subfamily: Lebiinae
- Tribe: Lebiini
- Subtribe: Celaenephina
- Genus: Celaenephes; Schmidt-Goebel, 1846

Synonyms
- Celenaephes Lacordaire, 1854; Coloenephes Bouchard, 1902; Fukuchina Habu, 1960; Taromorpha Blackburn, 1894

Genus of beetles

Celaenephes is a genus in the ground beetle family Carabidae.

== Species ==
These two species belong to the genus Celaenephes:

- Celaenephes linearis (Walker, 1858) (Japan, India, Indonesia, Borneo, Philippines, New Guinea, Solomon Islands, New Caledonia and Australia)
- Celaenephes parallelus Schmidt-Goebel, 1846 (Japan, Pakistan, India, Thailand, Indonesia, Borneo, Philippines, New Guinea, and Australia)
