= Holconotus =

Scientific classification
- Kingdom: Animalia
- Phylum: Arthropoda
- Class: Insecta
- Order: Coleoptera
- Suborder: Adephaga
- Family: Carabidae
- Subfamily: Pterostichinae
- Tribe: Pterostichini
- Subtribe: Abacetina
- Genus: Holconotus; Schmidt-Goebel, 1846

Genus of beetles

Holconotus is a genus in the beetle family Carabidae. There are about seven described species in Holconotus.

== Species ==
These seven species belong to the genus Holconotus:

- Holconotus africanus Tschitscherine, 1898 (Chad and Democratic Republic of the Congo)
- Holconotus crassimargo Tschitscherine, 1898 (Thailand and Cambodia)
- Holconotus ferrugineus Schmidt-Goebel, 1846 (Bangladesh, India, Myanmar, Thailand, Cambodia, and Vietnam)
- Holconotus gigas (Andrewes, 1937) (Myanmar)
- Holconotus madagascariensis Tschitscherine, 1900 (Madagascar)
- Holconotus rufus Chaudoir, 1876 (Ethiopia)
- Holconotus sinuatus Tschitscherine, 1898 (Mali and Democratic Republic of the Congo)
