= D. exigua =

D. exigua may refer to:

- Dalea exigua, a prairie clover
- Delia exigua, a calyptrate muscoid
- Dolichoctis exigua, a ground beetle
- Drimia exigua, a flowering plant
