= Scalidion =

Scientific classification
- Kingdom: Animalia
- Phylum: Arthropoda
- Class: Insecta
- Order: Coleoptera
- Suborder: Adephaga
- Family: Carabidae
- Subfamily: Lebiinae
- Tribe: Lebiini
- Subtribe: Lebiina
- Genus: Scalidion; Schmidt-Goebel, 1846

Genus of beetles

Scalidion is a genus in the beetle family Carabidae. There are at least four described species in Scalidion.

== Species ==
These four species belong to the genus Scalidion:

- Scalidion hilare Schmidt-Goebel, 1846 (China, Bhutan, India, and Myanmar)
- Scalidion nigrans (Bates, 1889) (China and Taiwan)
- Scalidion wudangshanensis Kirschenhofer, 2012 (China)
- Scalidion xanthophanum (Bates, 1888) (China)
