= Tetragonoderus intersectus =

Scientific classification
- Kingdom: Animalia
- Phylum: Arthropoda
- Clade: Pancrustacea
- Class: Insecta
- Order: Coleoptera
- Suborder: Adephaga
- Family: Carabidae
- Genus: Tetragonoderus
- Species: T. intersectus

Binomial name
- Tetragonoderus intersectus (Germar, 1824)

Species of beetle

Tetragonoderus intersectus is a species of beetle in the family Carabidae. It was described by Ernst Friedrich Germar in 1824. It feeds on various vegetable leaves such as cabbage and beet.
