= Tetragonoderus undatus =

Scientific classification
- Kingdom: Animalia
- Phylum: Arthropoda
- Class: Insecta
- Order: Coleoptera
- Suborder: Adephaga
- Family: Carabidae
- Genus: Tetragonoderus
- Species: T. undatus

Binomial name
- Tetragonoderus undatus Dejean, 1829

Species of beetle

Tetragonoderus undatus is a species of beetle in the family Carabidae. It was described by Dejean in 1829. It is found in South America.
