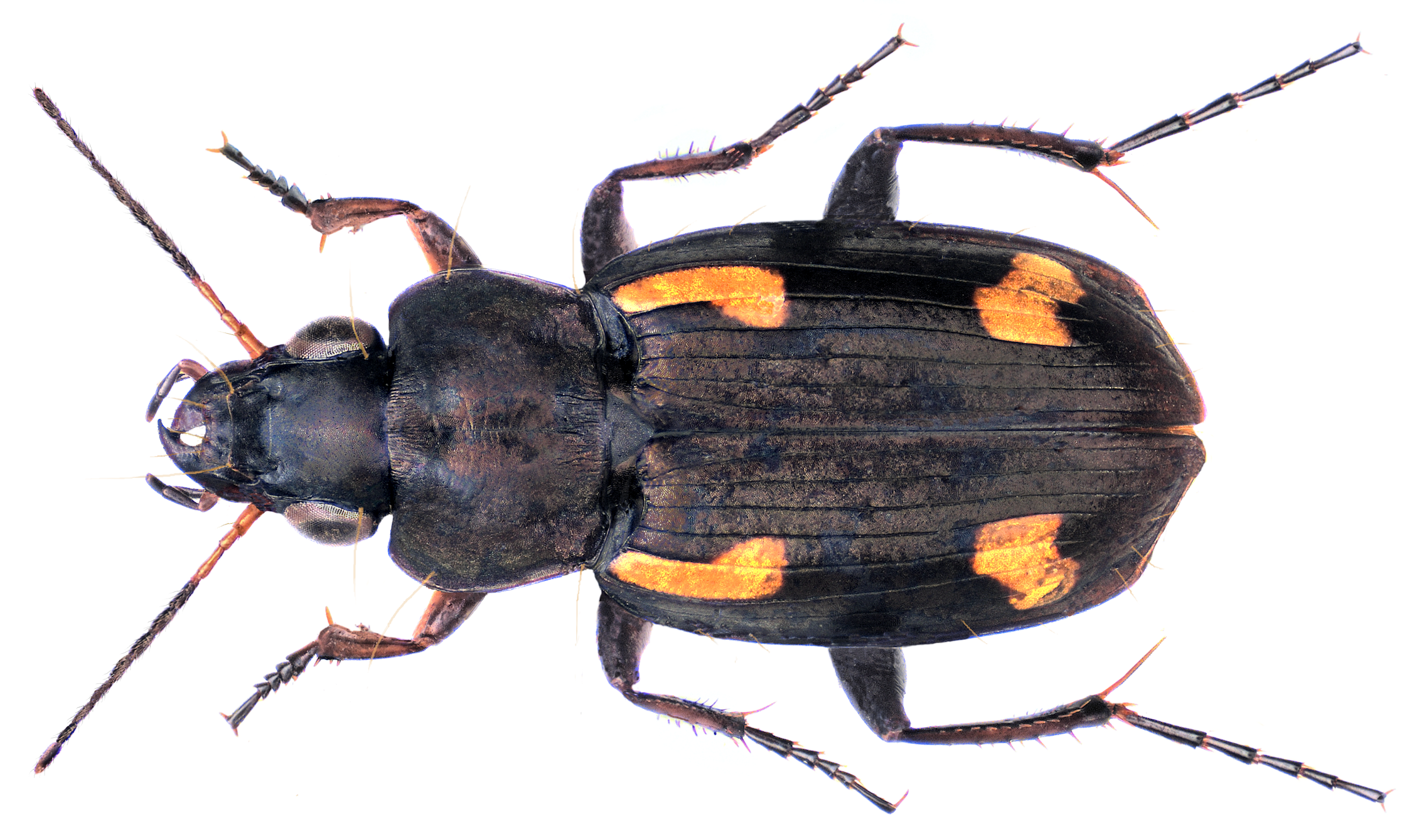

Scientific classification
- Domain: Eukaryota
- Kingdom: Animalia
- Phylum: Arthropoda
- Class: Insecta
- Order: Coleoptera
- Suborder: Adephaga
- Family: Carabidae
- Genus: Tetragonoderus
- Species: T. quadrisignatus

Binomial name
- Tetragonoderus quadrisignatus (Quensel In Schonherr, 1806)

= Tetragonoderus quadrisignatus =

Species of beetle

Tetragonoderus quadrisignatus is a species of beetle in the family Carabidae. It was described by Quensel In Schonherr in 1806.
