= Tetragonoderus stephaniae =

Scientific classification
- Domain: Eukaryota
- Kingdom: Animalia
- Phylum: Arthropoda
- Class: Insecta
- Order: Coleoptera
- Suborder: Adephaga
- Family: Carabidae
- Genus: Tetragonoderus
- Species: T. stephaniae

Binomial name
- Tetragonoderus stephaniae G.Muller, 1942

Species of beetle

Tetragonoderus stephaniae is a species of beetle in the family Carabidae. It was described by G.Muller in 1942.
