= Tetragonoderus pictus =

Scientific classification
- Domain: Eukaryota
- Kingdom: Animalia
- Phylum: Arthropoda
- Class: Insecta
- Order: Coleoptera
- Suborder: Adephaga
- Family: Carabidae
- Genus: Tetragonoderus
- Species: T. pictus

Binomial name
- Tetragonoderus pictus (Perty, 1830)

Species of beetle

Tetragonoderus pictus is a species of beetle in the family Carabidae. It was described by Perty in 1830.
