= Tetragonoderus nagatomii =

Scientific classification
- Kingdom: Animalia
- Phylum: Arthropoda
- Class: Insecta
- Order: Coleoptera
- Suborder: Adephaga
- Family: Carabidae
- Genus: Tetragonoderus
- Species: T. nagatomii

Binomial name
- Tetragonoderus nagatomii Jedlicka, 1966

Species of beetle

Tetragonoderus nagatomii is a species of beetle in the family Carabidae. It was described by Jedlicka in 1966.
