= Tetragonoderus dissimilis =

Scientific classification
- Kingdom: Animalia
- Phylum: Arthropoda
- Class: Insecta
- Order: Coleoptera
- Suborder: Adephaga
- Family: Carabidae
- Genus: Tetragonoderus
- Species: T. dissimilis

Binomial name
- Tetragonoderus dissimilis Basilewsky, 1955

Species of beetle

Tetragonoderus dissimilis is a species of beetle in the family Carabidae. It was described by Basilewsky in 1955.
