= Tetragonoderus perrieri =

Scientific classification
- Kingdom: Animalia
- Phylum: Arthropoda
- Class: Insecta
- Order: Coleoptera
- Suborder: Adephaga
- Family: Carabidae
- Genus: Tetragonoderus
- Species: T. perrieri

Binomial name
- Tetragonoderus perrieri Fairmaire, 1900

Species of beetle

Tetragonoderus perrieri is a species of beetle in the family Carabidae. It was described by Fairmaire in 1900.
