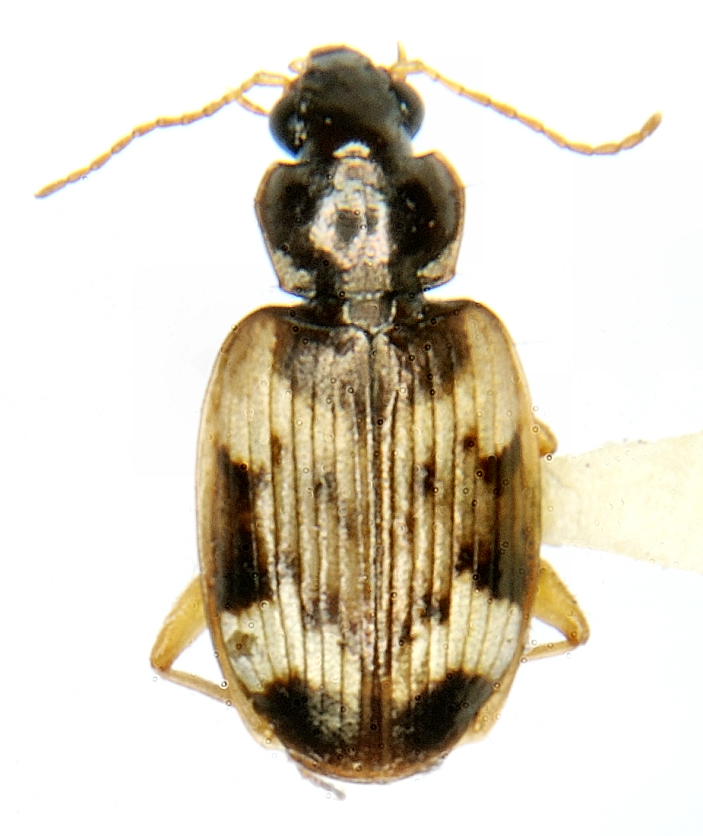

Scientific classification
- Kingdom: Animalia
- Phylum: Arthropoda
- Class: Insecta
- Order: Coleoptera
- Suborder: Adephaga
- Family: Carabidae
- Genus: Tetragonoderus
- Species: T. fasciatus

Binomial name
- Tetragonoderus fasciatus (Haldeman, 1843)

= Tetragonoderus fasciatus =

Species of beetle

Tetragonoderus fasciatus is a species of beetle in the family Carabidae. It was described by Haldeman in 1843.
