= Tetragonoderus luridus =

Scientific classification
- Kingdom: Animalia
- Phylum: Arthropoda
- Class: Insecta
- Order: Coleoptera
- Suborder: Adephaga
- Family: Carabidae
- Genus: Tetragonoderus
- Species: T. luridus

Binomial name
- Tetragonoderus luridus Quedenfeldt, 1883

Species of beetle

Tetragonoderus luridus is a species of beetle in the family Carabidae. It was described by Quedenfeldt in 1883.
