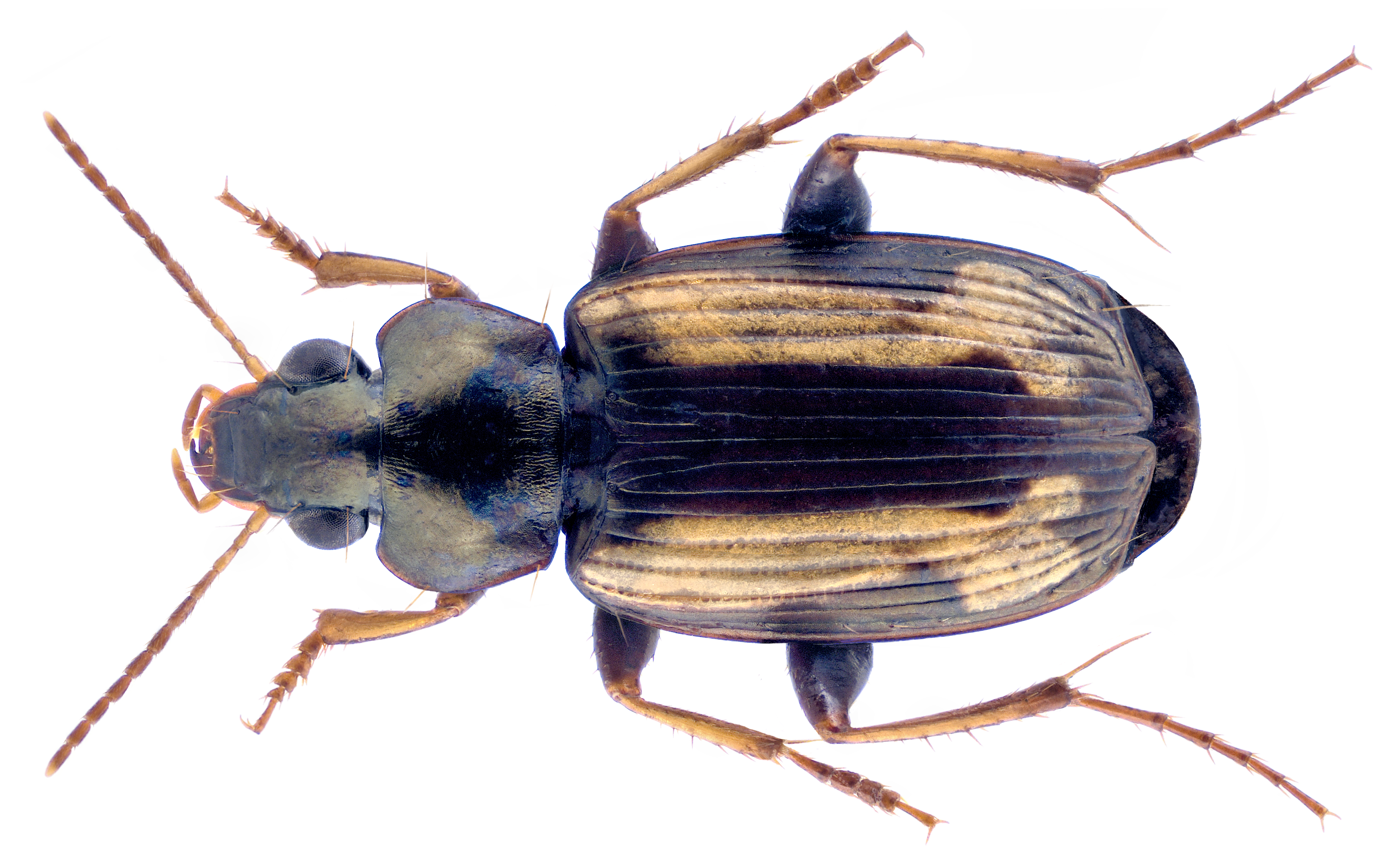

Scientific classification
- Kingdom: Animalia
- Phylum: Arthropoda
- Clade: Pancrustacea
- Class: Insecta
- Order: Coleoptera
- Suborder: Adephaga
- Family: Carabidae
- Genus: Tetragonoderus
- Species: T. quadrum

Binomial name
- Tetragonoderus quadrum (Fabricius, 1792)

= Tetragonoderus quadrum =

Species of beetle

Tetragonoderus quadrum is a species of beetle in the family Carabidae. It was described by Fabricus in 1792.
