= Tetragonoderus notaphioides =

Scientific classification
- Kingdom: Animalia
- Phylum: Arthropoda
- Class: Insecta
- Order: Coleoptera
- Suborder: Adephaga
- Family: Carabidae
- Genus: Tetragonoderus
- Species: T. notaphioides

Binomial name
- Tetragonoderus notaphioides Motschulsky, 1861

Species of beetle

Tetragonoderus notaphioides is a species of beetle in the family Carabidae. It was described by Victor Motschulsky in 1861.
