= Tetragonoderus toamasinae =

Scientific classification
- Kingdom: Animalia
- Phylum: Arthropoda
- Class: Insecta
- Order: Coleoptera
- Suborder: Adephaga
- Family: Carabidae
- Genus: Tetragonoderus
- Species: T. toamasinae

Binomial name
- Tetragonoderus toamasinae Alluaud, 1896

Species of beetle

Tetragonoderus toamasinae is a species of beetle in the family Carabidae. It was described by Alluaud in 1896.
