= Tetragonoderus latipennis =

Scientific classification
- Kingdom: Animalia
- Phylum: Arthropoda
- Class: Insecta
- Order: Coleoptera
- Suborder: Adephaga
- Family: Carabidae
- Genus: Tetragonoderus
- Species: T. latipennis

Binomial name
- Tetragonoderus latipennis LeConte, 1874

Species of beetle

Tetragonoderus latipennis is a species of beetle in the family Carabidae. It was described by John Lawrence LeConte in 1874.
