= Tetragonoderus cursor =

Scientific classification
- Kingdom: Animalia
- Phylum: Arthropoda
- Class: Insecta
- Order: Coleoptera
- Suborder: Adephaga
- Family: Carabidae
- Genus: Tetragonoderus
- Species: T. cursor

Binomial name
- Tetragonoderus cursor Bates, 1886

Species of beetle

Tetragonoderus cursor is a species of beetle in the family Carabidae. It was described by Henry Walter Bates in 1886.
