= Tetragonoderus bilunatus =

Scientific classification
- Kingdom: Animalia
- Phylum: Arthropoda
- Class: Insecta
- Order: Coleoptera
- Suborder: Adephaga
- Family: Carabidae
- Genus: Tetragonoderus
- Species: T. bilunatus

Binomial name
- Tetragonoderus bilunatus Klug, 1833

Species of beetle

Tetragonoderus bilunatus is a species of beetle in the family Carabidae. It was described by Johann Christoph Friedrich Klug in 1833.
