= Tetragonoderus tesselatus =

Scientific classification
- Kingdom: Animalia
- Phylum: Arthropoda
- Class: Insecta
- Order: Coleoptera
- Suborder: Adephaga
- Family: Carabidae
- Genus: Tetragonoderus
- Species: T. tesselatus

Binomial name
- Tetragonoderus tesselatus Chaudoir, 1876

Species of beetle

Tetragonoderus tesselatus is a species of beetle in the family Carabidae. It was described by Maximilien Chaudoir in 1876.
