= Tetragonoderus simplex =

Scientific classification
- Kingdom: Animalia
- Phylum: Arthropoda
- Class: Insecta
- Order: Coleoptera
- Suborder: Adephaga
- Family: Carabidae
- Genus: Tetragonoderus
- Species: T. simplex

Binomial name
- Tetragonoderus simplex Bates, 1883

Species of beetle

Tetragonoderus simplex is a species of beetle in the family Carabidae. It was described by Henry Walter Bates in 1883.
