= Tetragonoderus quadriguttatus =

Scientific classification
- Kingdom: Animalia
- Phylum: Arthropoda
- Class: Insecta
- Order: Coleoptera
- Suborder: Adephaga
- Family: Carabidae
- Genus: Tetragonoderus
- Species: T. quadriguttatus

Binomial name
- Tetragonoderus quadriguttatus Dejean, 1829

Species of beetle

Tetragonoderus quadriguttatus is a species of beetle in the family Carabidae. It was described by the renowned French entomologist Pierre François Marie Auguste Dejean in 1829.
