= Tetragonoderus intermedius =

Scientific classification
- Kingdom: Animalia
- Phylum: Arthropoda
- Class: Insecta
- Order: Coleoptera
- Suborder: Adephaga
- Family: Carabidae
- Genus: Tetragonoderus
- Species: T. intermedius

Binomial name
- Tetragonoderus intermedius Solsky, 1874

Species of beetle

Tetragonoderus intermedius is a species of beetle in the family Carabidae. It was described by Solsky in 1874.
