= Tetragonoderus eximius =

Scientific classification
- Kingdom: Animalia
- Phylum: Arthropoda
- Class: Insecta
- Order: Coleoptera
- Suborder: Adephaga
- Family: Carabidae
- Genus: Tetragonoderus
- Species: T. eximius

Binomial name
- Tetragonoderus eximius Kirsch, 1873

Species of beetle

Tetragonoderus eximius is a species of beetle in the family Carabidae. It was described by Theodor Franz Wilhelm Kirsch in 1873.
