= Tetragonoderus thunbergi =

Scientific classification
- Domain: Eukaryota
- Kingdom: Animalia
- Phylum: Arthropoda
- Class: Insecta
- Order: Coleoptera
- Suborder: Adephaga
- Family: Carabidae
- Genus: Tetragonoderus
- Species: T. thunbergi

Binomial name
- Tetragonoderus thunbergi Crotch, 1870

Species of beetle

Tetragonoderus thunbergi is a species of beetle in the family Carabidae. It was described by Crotch in 1870.
