= Tetragonoderus insularius =

Scientific classification
- Kingdom: Animalia
- Phylum: Arthropoda
- Class: Insecta
- Order: Coleoptera
- Suborder: Adephaga
- Family: Carabidae
- Genus: Tetragonoderus
- Species: T. insularius

Binomial name
- Tetragonoderus insularius Andrewes, 1931

Species of beetle

Tetragonoderus insularius is a species of beetle in the family Carabidae. It was described by Andrewes in 1931.
