= Tetragonoderus gabonicus =

Scientific classification
- Kingdom: Animalia
- Phylum: Arthropoda
- Class: Insecta
- Order: Coleoptera
- Suborder: Adephaga
- Family: Carabidae
- Genus: Tetragonoderus
- Species: T. gabonicus

Binomial name
- Tetragonoderus gabonicus Chaudoir, 1876

Species of beetle

Tetragonoderus gabonicus is a species of beetle in the family Carabidae. It was described by Maximilien Chaudoir in 1876.
