= Microlestes curtipennis =

Scientific classification
- Kingdom: Animalia
- Phylum: Arthropoda
- Class: Insecta
- Order: Coleoptera
- Suborder: Adephaga
- Family: Carabidae
- Genus: Microlestes
- Species: M. curtipennis

Binomial name
- Microlestes curtipennis (Casey, 1920)

Species of beetle

Microlestes curtipennis is a species of ground beetle in the family Carabidae. It is found in North America.
