= Tetragonoderus quadrinotatus =

Scientific classification
- Kingdom: Animalia
- Phylum: Arthropoda
- Clade: Pancrustacea
- Class: Insecta
- Order: Coleoptera
- Suborder: Adephaga
- Family: Carabidae
- Genus: Tetragonoderus
- Species: T. quadrinotatus

Binomial name
- Tetragonoderus quadrinotatus (Fabricius, 1798)

Species of beetle

Tetragonoderus quadrinotatus is a species of beetle in the family Carabidae. It was described by Fabricus in 1798.
