= Tetragonoderus chalceus =

Scientific classification
- Kingdom: Animalia
- Phylum: Arthropoda
- Class: Insecta
- Order: Coleoptera
- Suborder: Adephaga
- Family: Carabidae
- Genus: Tetragonoderus
- Species: T. chalceus

Binomial name
- Tetragonoderus chalceus Chaudoir, 1876

Species of beetle

Tetragonoderus chalceus is a species of beetle in the family Carabidae. It was described by Chaudoir in 1876. It is endemic to Argentina.
