= Tetragonoderus subfasciatus =

Scientific classification
- Kingdom: Animalia
- Phylum: Arthropoda
- Class: Insecta
- Order: Coleoptera
- Suborder: Adephaga
- Family: Carabidae
- Genus: Tetragonoderus
- Species: T. subfasciatus

Binomial name
- Tetragonoderus subfasciatus (Putzeys, 1846)

Species of beetle

Tetragonoderus subfasciatus is a species of beetle in the family Carabidae. It was described by Jules Putzeys in 1846.
