= Tetragonoderus assamensis =

Scientific classification
- Kingdom: Animalia
- Phylum: Arthropoda
- Class: Insecta
- Order: Coleoptera
- Suborder: Adephaga
- Family: Carabidae
- Genus: Tetragonoderus
- Species: T. assamensis

Binomial name
- Tetragonoderus assamensis Jedlicka, 1964

Species of beetle

Tetragonoderus assamensis is a species of beetle in the family Carabidae. It was described by Jedlicka in 1964.
