= Tetragonoderus columbicus =

Scientific classification
- Kingdom: Animalia
- Phylum: Arthropoda
- Class: Insecta
- Order: Coleoptera
- Suborder: Adephaga
- Family: Carabidae
- Genus: Tetragonoderus
- Species: T. columbicus

Binomial name
- Tetragonoderus columbicus Steinheil, 1875

Species of beetle

Tetragonoderus columbicus is a species of beetle in the family Carabidae. It was described by Steinheil in 1875.
