= Tetragonoderus unicolor =

Scientific classification
- Domain: Eukaryota
- Kingdom: Animalia
- Phylum: Arthropoda
- Class: Insecta
- Order: Coleoptera
- Suborder: Adephaga
- Family: Carabidae
- Genus: Tetragonoderus
- Species: T. unicolor

Binomial name
- Tetragonoderus unicolor Gemminger & Harold, 1868

Species of beetle

Tetragonoderus unicolor is a species of beetle in the family Carabidae. It was described by Gemminger & Harold in 1868.
