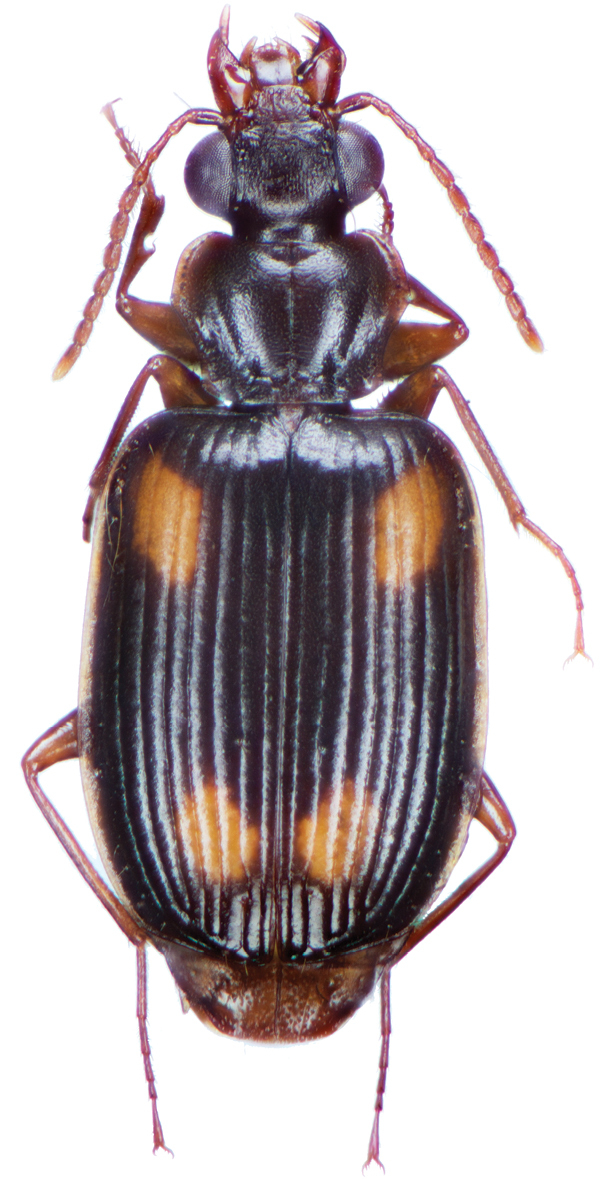

Scientific classification
- Kingdom: Animalia
- Phylum: Arthropoda
- Class: Insecta
- Order: Coleoptera
- Suborder: Adephaga
- Family: Carabidae
- Genus: Mochtherus
- Species: M. tetraspilotus

Binomial name
- Mochtherus tetraspilotus (Macleay, 1825)

= Mochtherus tetraspilotus =

Species of beetle

Mochtherus tetraspilotus is a species of ground beetle in the family Carabidae. It is found in North America, temperate Asia, and the Pacific Ocean.
