= Tetragonoderus multiguttatus =

Scientific classification
- Kingdom: Animalia
- Phylum: Arthropoda
- Class: Insecta
- Order: Coleoptera
- Suborder: Adephaga
- Family: Carabidae
- Genus: Tetragonoderus
- Species: T. multiguttatus

Binomial name
- Tetragonoderus multiguttatus Putzeys, 1846

Species of beetle

Tetragonoderus multiguttatus is a species of beetle in the family Carabidae. It was described by Jules Putzeys in 1846.
