= Tetragonoderus lozai =

Scientific classification
- Kingdom: Animalia
- Phylum: Arthropoda
- Class: Insecta
- Order: Coleoptera
- Suborder: Adephaga
- Family: Carabidae
- Genus: Tetragonoderus
- Species: T. lozai

Binomial name
- Tetragonoderus lozai Allen, 1937

Species of beetle

Tetragonoderus lozai is a species of beetle in the family Carabidae. It was described by Allen in 1937.
