= Tetragonoderus figuratus =

Scientific classification
- Kingdom: Animalia
- Phylum: Arthropoda
- Class: Insecta
- Order: Coleoptera
- Suborder: Adephaga
- Family: Carabidae
- Genus: Tetragonoderus
- Species: T. figuratus

Binomial name
- Tetragonoderus figuratus Dejean, 1831

Species of beetle

Tetragonoderus figuratus is a species of beetle in the family Carabidae. It was described by Pierre François Marie Auguste Dejean in 1831.
