= Tetragonoderus foveicollis =

Scientific classification
- Kingdom: Animalia
- Phylum: Arthropoda
- Class: Insecta
- Order: Coleoptera
- Suborder: Adephaga
- Family: Carabidae
- Genus: Tetragonoderus
- Species: T. foveicollis

Binomial name
- Tetragonoderus foveicollis Liebke, 1951

Species of beetle

Tetragonoderus foveicollis is a species of beetle in the family Carabidae. It was described by Liebke in 1951.
