= Tetragonoderus bivittatus =

Scientific classification
- Kingdom: Animalia
- Phylum: Arthropoda
- Class: Insecta
- Order: Coleoptera
- Suborder: Adephaga
- Family: Carabidae
- Genus: Tetragonoderus
- Species: T. bivittatus

Binomial name
- Tetragonoderus bivittatus Jeannel, 1949

Species of beetle

Tetragonoderus bivittatus is a species of beetle in the family Carabidae. It was described by Jeannel in 1949.
