= Tetragonoderus mexicanus =

Scientific classification
- Kingdom: Animalia
- Phylum: Arthropoda
- Class: Insecta
- Order: Coleoptera
- Suborder: Adephaga
- Family: Carabidae
- Genus: Tetragonoderus
- Species: T. mexicanus

Binomial name
- Tetragonoderus mexicanus (Chaudoir, 1876)

Species of beetle

Tetragonoderus mexicanus is a species of beetle in the family Carabidae. It was described by Chaudoir in 1876. It can be found in Mexico, Guatemala and Nicaragua.
