= Tetragonoderus lindneri =

Scientific classification
- Kingdom: Animalia
- Phylum: Arthropoda
- Class: Insecta
- Order: Coleoptera
- Suborder: Adephaga
- Family: Carabidae
- Genus: Tetragonoderus
- Species: T. lindneri

Binomial name
- Tetragonoderus lindneri Emden, 1935

Species of beetle

Tetragonoderus lindneri is a species of beetle in the family Carabidae. It was described by Emden in 1935.
