= Tetragonoderus deuvei =

Scientific classification
- Kingdom: Animalia
- Phylum: Arthropoda
- Clade: Pancrustacea
- Class: Insecta
- Order: Coleoptera
- Suborder: Adephaga
- Family: Carabidae
- Genus: Tetragonoderus
- Species: T. deuvei

Binomial name
- Tetragonoderus deuvei Shpeley & Ball, 2008

Species of beetle

Tetragonoderus deuvei is a species of beetle in the family Carabidae. It was described by Shpeley & Ball in 2008.

The taxon was named after Dr. Thierry Deuve.
