= Tetragonoderus kaszabi =

Scientific classification
- Kingdom: Animalia
- Phylum: Arthropoda
- Class: Insecta
- Order: Coleoptera
- Suborder: Adephaga
- Family: Carabidae
- Genus: Tetragonoderus
- Species: T. kaszabi

Binomial name
- Tetragonoderus kaszabi Basilewsky, 1987

Species of beetle

Tetragonoderus kaszabi is a species of beetle in the family Carabidae. It was described by Basilewsky in 1987.
