= Tetragonoderus velutinus =

Scientific classification
- Kingdom: Animalia
- Phylum: Arthropoda
- Class: Insecta
- Order: Coleoptera
- Suborder: Adephaga
- Family: Carabidae
- Genus: Tetragonoderus
- Species: T. velutinus

Binomial name
- Tetragonoderus velutinus Motschulsky, 1864

Species of beetle

Tetragonoderus velutinus is a species of beetle in the family Carabidae. It was described by Victor Motschulsky in 1864.
