= Tetragonoderus dispar =

Scientific classification
- Kingdom: Animalia
- Phylum: Arthropoda
- Class: Insecta
- Order: Coleoptera
- Suborder: Adephaga
- Family: Carabidae
- Genus: Tetragonoderus
- Species: T. dispar

Binomial name
- Tetragonoderus dispar Peringuey, 1892

Species of beetle

Tetragonoderus dispar is a species of beetle in the family Carabidae. It was described by Peringuey in 1892.
