= Tetragonoderus kuntzeni =

Scientific classification
- Kingdom: Animalia
- Phylum: Arthropoda
- Class: Insecta
- Order: Coleoptera
- Suborder: Adephaga
- Family: Carabidae
- Genus: Tetragonoderus
- Species: T. kuntzeni

Binomial name
- Tetragonoderus kuntzeni Burgeon, 1936

Species of beetle

Tetragonoderus kuntzeni is a species of beetle in the family Carabidae. It was described by Burgeon in 1936.
