= Tetragonoderus quadrimaculatus =

Scientific classification
- Domain: Eukaryota
- Kingdom: Animalia
- Phylum: Arthropoda
- Class: Insecta
- Order: Coleoptera
- Suborder: Adephaga
- Family: Carabidae
- Genus: Tetragonoderus
- Species: T. quadrimaculatus

Binomial name
- Tetragonoderus quadrimaculatus Gory, 1833

Species of beetle

Tetragonoderus quadrimaculatus is a species of beetle in the family Carabidae. It was described by Gory in 1833.
