= Tetragonoderus spinifer =

Scientific classification
- Kingdom: Animalia
- Phylum: Arthropoda
- Class: Insecta
- Order: Coleoptera
- Suborder: Adephaga
- Family: Carabidae
- Genus: Tetragonoderus
- Species: T. spinifer

Binomial name
- Tetragonoderus spinifer (Jeannel, 1949)

Species of beetle

Tetragonoderus spinifer is a species of beetle in the family Carabidae. It was described by Jeannel in 1949.
