= Tetragonoderus sticticus =

Scientific classification
- Kingdom: Animalia
- Phylum: Arthropoda
- Class: Insecta
- Order: Coleoptera
- Suborder: Adephaga
- Family: Carabidae
- Genus: Tetragonoderus
- Species: T. sticticus

Binomial name
- Tetragonoderus sticticus Erichson, 1847

Species of beetle

Tetragonoderus sticticus is a species of beetle in the family Carabidae. It was described by Wilhelm Ferdinand Erichson in 1847.
