= Tetragonoderus swahilius =

Scientific classification
- Kingdom: Animalia
- Phylum: Arthropoda
- Class: Insecta
- Order: Coleoptera
- Suborder: Adephaga
- Family: Carabidae
- Genus: Tetragonoderus
- Species: T. swahilius

Binomial name
- Tetragonoderus swahilius Alluaud, 1931

Species of beetle

Tetragonoderus swahilius is a species of beetle in the family Carabidae. It was described by Alluaud in 1931.
