= Tetragonoderus lindemannae =

Scientific classification
- Kingdom: Animalia
- Phylum: Arthropoda
- Class: Insecta
- Order: Coleoptera
- Suborder: Adephaga
- Family: Carabidae
- Genus: Tetragonoderus
- Species: T. lindemannae

Binomial name
- Tetragonoderus lindemannae Jedlicka, 1963

Species of beetle

Tetragonoderus lindemannae is a species of beetle in the family Carabidae. It was described by Jedlicka in 1963.
