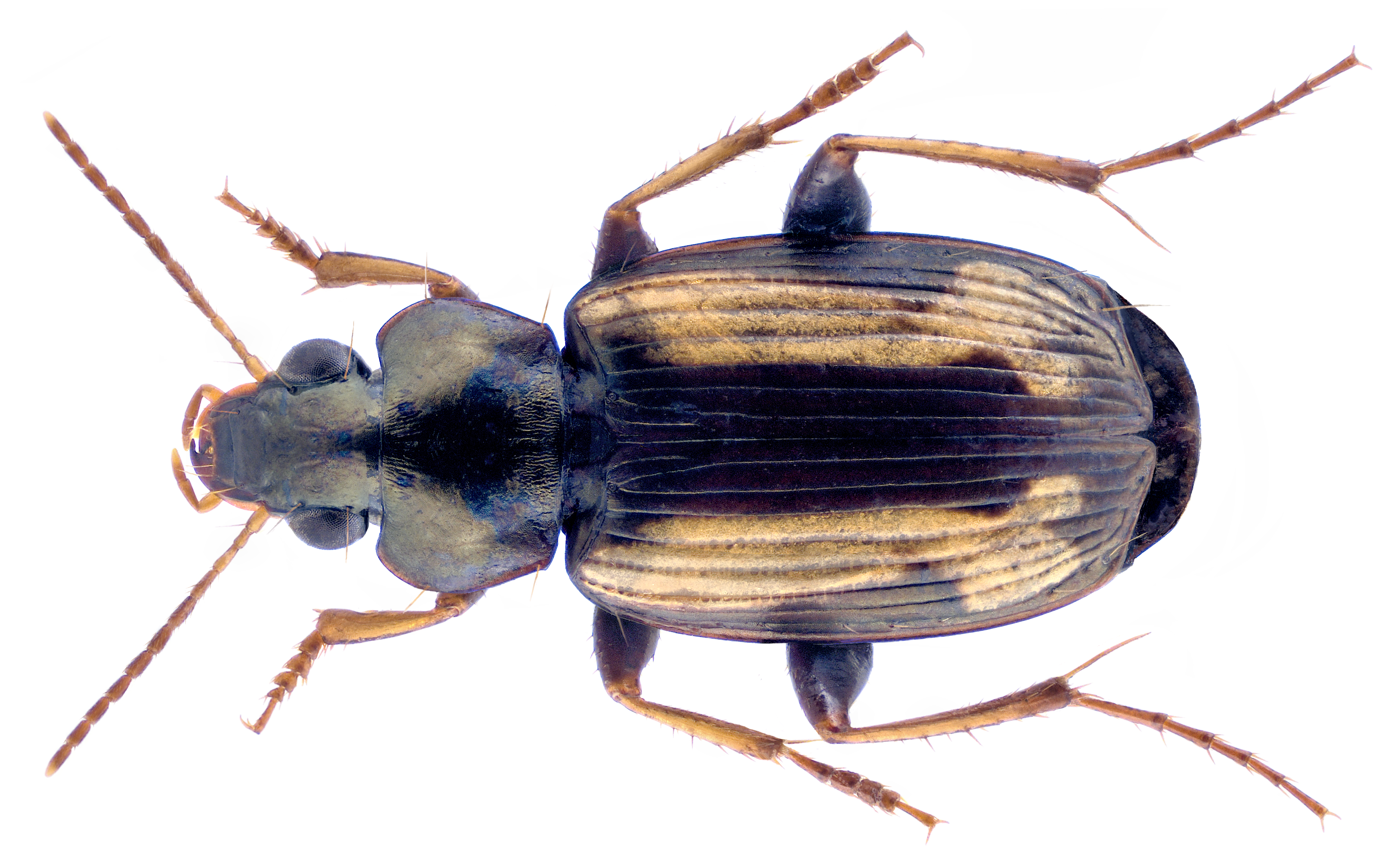
- Tetragonoderus quadrum

Scientific classification
- Kingdom: Animalia
- Phylum: Arthropoda
- Class: Insecta
- Order: Coleoptera
- Suborder: Adephaga
- Family: Carabidae
- Subfamily: Lebiinae
- Tribe: Cyclosomini
- Subtribe: Cyclosomina
- Genus: Tetragonoderus; Dejean, 1829

Subgenera
- Crossonychus Chaudoir, 1848; Cyclicus Jeannel, 1949; Peronoscelis Chaudoir, 1876; Tetragonoderus Dejean, 1829

= Tetragonoderus =

Genus of beetles

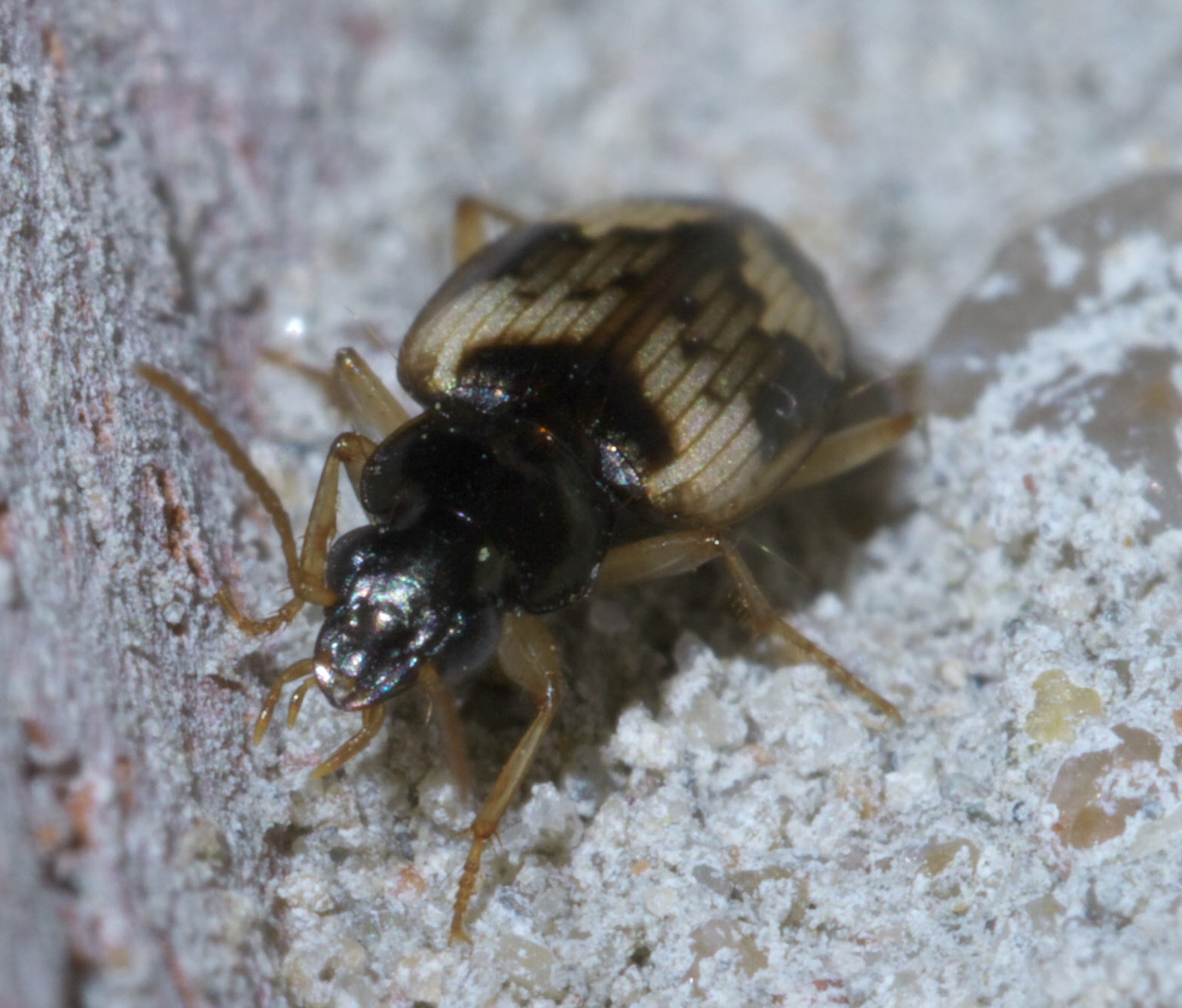
Tetragonoderus fasciatus

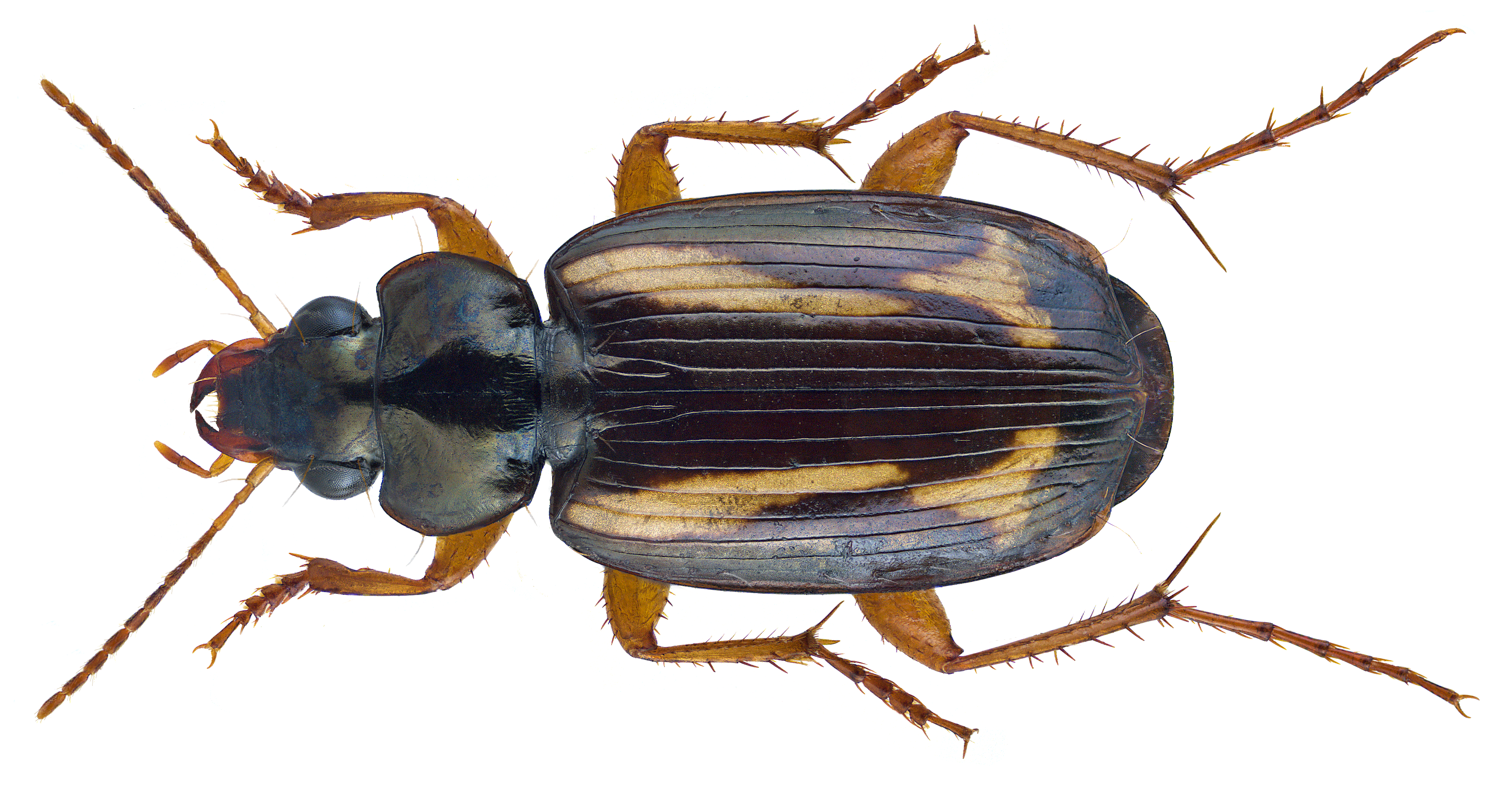
Tetragonoderus interruptus

Tetragonoderus is a genus of beetles in the family Carabidae.

== Species ==
These 101 species belong to the genus Tetragonoderus:

- Tetragonoderus aegypticus Jedlicka, 1952
- Tetragonoderus amrishi Makhan, 2010
- Tetragonoderus andrewesi Emden, 1934
- Tetragonoderus arcuatus Dejean, 1829
- Tetragonoderus assamensis Jedlicka, 1964
- Tetragonoderus assuanensis Mjöberg, 1905
- Tetragonoderus babaulti Alluaud, 1931
- Tetragonoderus bastardi Alluaud, 1897
- Tetragonoderus bayeri Burgeon, 1936
- Tetragonoderus bilunatus Klug, 1833
- Tetragonoderus bivittatus Jeannel, 1949
- Tetragonoderus chalceus Chaudoir, 1876
- Tetragonoderus chaudoiri Liebke, 1928
- Tetragonoderus chilensis (Dejean, 1831)
- Tetragonoderus cinchona Jedlicka, 1964
- Tetragonoderus columbicus Steinheil, 1875
- Tetragonoderus crux Dejean, 1829
- Tetragonoderus cursor Bates, 1886
- Tetragonoderus deuvei Shpeley & Ball, 2008
- Tetragonoderus dilatatus (Wiedemann, 1823)
- Tetragonoderus discopunctatus Chaudoir, 1850
- Tetragonoderus dispar Péringuey, 1892
- Tetragonoderus dissimilis (Basilewsky, 1955)
- Tetragonoderus elegans Andrewes, 1931
- Tetragonoderus eximius Kirsch, 1873
- Tetragonoderus extremus Bedel, 1905
- Tetragonoderus fasciatus (Haldeman, 1843)
- Tetragonoderus femoralis (Chaudoir, 1876)
- Tetragonoderus figuratus Dejean, 1831
- Tetragonoderus fimbriatus Bates, 1886
- Tetragonoderus flavovittatus C.O.Waterhouse, 1881
- Tetragonoderus foveicollis Liebke, 1951
- Tetragonoderus gabonicus Chaudoir, 1876
- Tetragonoderus immaculatus LaFerté-Sénectère, 1853
- Tetragonoderus inermis (Jeannel, 1949)
- Tetragonoderus insignicollis Chaudoir, 1876
- Tetragonoderus insularius Andrewes, 1931
- Tetragonoderus intermedius Solsky, 1874
- Tetragonoderus intermixtus Bates, 1883
- Tetragonoderus interruptus Dejean, 1829
- Tetragonoderus intersectus (Germar, 1823)
- Tetragonoderus jeanneli Alluaud, 1931
- Tetragonoderus kaszabi (Basilewsky, 1987)
- Tetragonoderus kuntzeni Burgeon, 1936
- Tetragonoderus lacordairei Chaudoir, 1876
- Tetragonoderus laevigatus Chaudoir, 1876
- Tetragonoderus latipennis LeConte, 1874
- Tetragonoderus leleupi (Basilewsky, 1956)
- Tetragonoderus leprieuri Gory, 1833
- Tetragonoderus lindemannae Jedlicka, 1963
- Tetragonoderus lindneri Emden, 1935
- Tetragonoderus linealis Andrewes, 1938
- Tetragonoderus longipes Faccchini, 2011
- Tetragonoderus lozai Allen, 1973
- Tetragonoderus luridus Quedenfeldt, 1883
- Tetragonoderus matilei Ball, 2000
- Tetragonoderus mexicanus (Chaudoir, 1876)
- Tetragonoderus microthorax Jian & Tian, 2009
- Tetragonoderus mixtus Chaudoir, 1876
- Tetragonoderus multiguttatus Putzeys, 1846
- Tetragonoderus nagatomii Jedlicka, 1966
- Tetragonoderus nakaoi Jedlicka, 1966
- Tetragonoderus notaphioides Motschulsky, 1861
- Tetragonoderus obscurus Chaudoir, 1876
- Tetragonoderus omophronides (Chaudoir, 1876)
- Tetragonoderus oxyomus (Chaudoir, 1876)
- Tetragonoderus pallidus G.Horn, 1869
- Tetragonoderus perrieri Fairmaire, 1900
- Tetragonoderus pictus (Perty, 1830)
- Tetragonoderus poecilus Bates, 1883
- Tetragonoderus punctatus (Wiedemann, 1823)
- Tetragonoderus quadriguttatus Dejean, 1829
- Tetragonoderus quadrimaculatus Gory, 1833
- Tetragonoderus quadrinotatus (Fabricius, 1798)
- Tetragonoderus quadrisignatus (Quensel, 1806)
- Tetragonoderus quadrum (Fabricius, 1792)
- Tetragonoderus rhombophorus Schmidt-Goebel, 1846
- Tetragonoderus rishwani Makhan, 2010
- Tetragonoderus rivularis Erichson, 1847
- Tetragonoderus sericatus Dejean, 1829
- Tetragonoderus simplex Bates, 1883
- Tetragonoderus sinanensis J.K.Park; Min & J.Park, 2013
- Tetragonoderus sinuosus Chaudoir, 1876
- Tetragonoderus sivianus Liebke, 1951
- Tetragonoderus spinifer (Jeannel, 1949)
- Tetragonoderus stephaniae G.Müller, 1942
- Tetragonoderus sticticus Erichson, 1847
- Tetragonoderus subfasciatus (Putzeys, 1845)
- Tetragonoderus swahilius Alluaud, 1931
- Tetragonoderus taeniatus (Wiedemann, 1823)
- Tetragonoderus tesselatus Chaudoir, 1876
- Tetragonoderus tetragrammus Chaudoir, 1876
- Tetragonoderus thunbergi Crotch, 1871
- Tetragonoderus toamasinae Alluaud, 1896
- Tetragonoderus undatus Dejean, 1829
- Tetragonoderus unicolor Gemminger & Harold, 1868
- Tetragonoderus variegatus Dejean, 1829
- Tetragonoderus variipennis (Chaudoir, 1876)
- Tetragonoderus velutinus Motschulsky, 1864
- Tetragonoderus viridicollis Dejean, 1829
- Tetragonoderus viridis (Dejean, 1831)
