= Tetragonoderus punctatus =

Scientific classification
- Kingdom: Animalia
- Phylum: Arthropoda
- Class: Insecta
- Order: Coleoptera
- Suborder: Adephaga
- Family: Carabidae
- Genus: Tetragonoderus
- Species: T. punctatus

Binomial name
- Tetragonoderus punctatus (Wiedemann, 1823)

Species of beetle

Tetragonoderus punctatus is a species of beetle in the family Carabidae. It was described by Wiedemann in 1823.
