= Tetragonoderus pallidus =

Scientific classification
- Kingdom: Animalia
- Phylum: Arthropoda
- Class: Insecta
- Order: Coleoptera
- Suborder: Adephaga
- Family: Carabidae
- Genus: Tetragonoderus
- Species: T. pallidus

Binomial name
- Tetragonoderus pallidus G.Horn, 1868

Species of beetle

Tetragonoderus pallidus is a species of beetle in the family Carabidae. It was described by G. Horn in 1868. It is endemic to the Sonoran Desert in Southwestern United States (Arizona and California) and Mexico.
