= Tetragonoderus immaculatus =

Scientific classification
- Kingdom: Animalia
- Phylum: Arthropoda
- Class: Insecta
- Order: Coleoptera
- Suborder: Adephaga
- Family: Carabidae
- Genus: Tetragonoderus
- Species: T. immaculatus

Binomial name
- Tetragonoderus immaculatus Laferte-Senectere, 1853

Species of beetle

Tetragonoderus immaculatus is a species of beetle in the family Carabidae. It was described by Laferte-Senectere in 1853.
