= Tetragonoderus flavovittatus =

Scientific classification
- Kingdom: Animalia
- Phylum: Arthropoda
- Class: Insecta
- Order: Coleoptera
- Suborder: Adephaga
- Family: Carabidae
- Genus: Tetragonoderus
- Species: T. flavovittatus

Binomial name
- Tetragonoderus flavovittatus C.O.Waterhouse, 1881

Species of beetle

Tetragonoderus flavovittatus is a species of beetle in the family Carabidae. It was described by C.O.Waterhouse in 1881.
