= Tetragonoderus matilei =

Scientific classification
- Kingdom: Animalia
- Phylum: Arthropoda
- Class: Insecta
- Order: Coleoptera
- Suborder: Adephaga
- Family: Carabidae
- Genus: Tetragonoderus
- Species: T. matilei

Binomial name
- Tetragonoderus matilei Ball, 2000

Species of beetle

Tetragonoderus matilei is a species of beetle in the family Carabidae. It was described by Ball in 2000.
