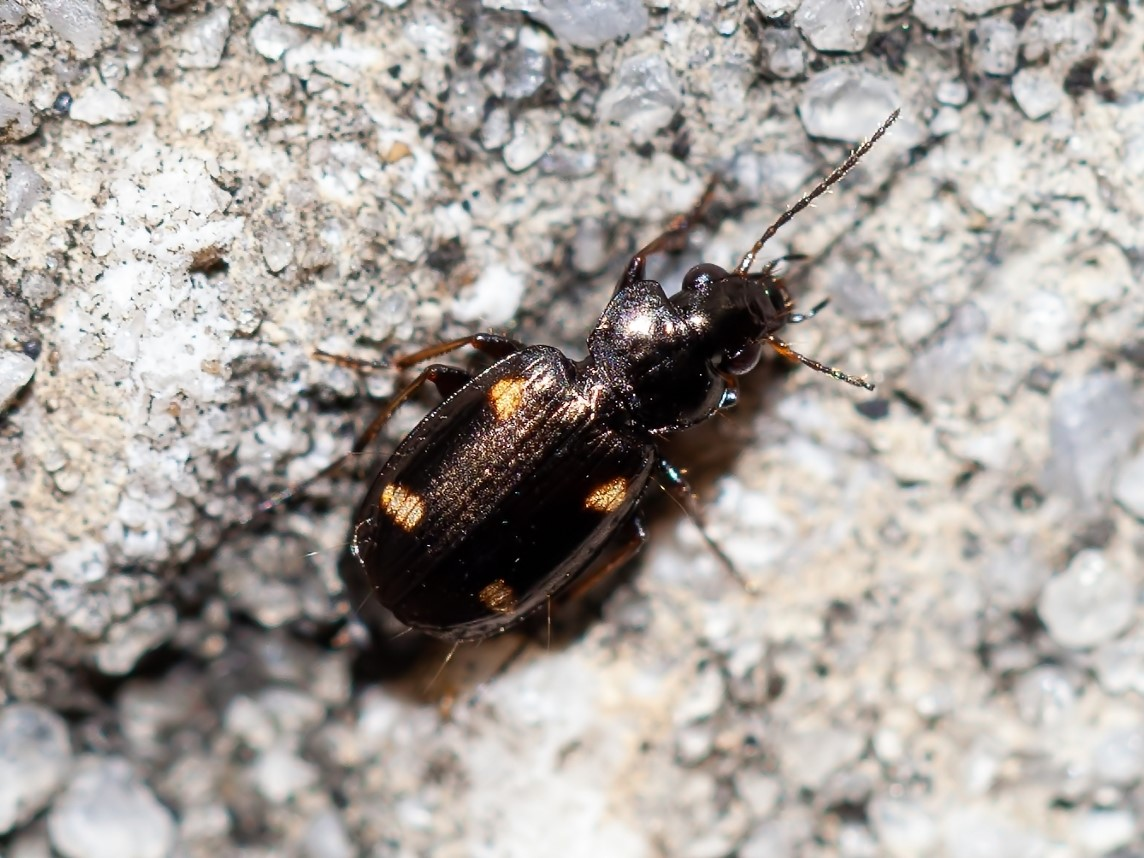

Scientific classification
- Kingdom: Animalia
- Phylum: Arthropoda
- Class: Insecta
- Order: Coleoptera
- Suborder: Adephaga
- Family: Carabidae
- Genus: Tetragonoderus
- Species: T. laevigatus

Binomial name
- Tetragonoderus laevigatus Chaudoir, 1876

= Tetragonoderus laevigatus =

Species of beetle

Tetragonoderus laevigatus is a species of beetle in the family Carabidae. It was introduced to the United States of Florida, Georgia, Mississippi, and Louisiana.
