= Tetragonoderus sinuosus =

Scientific classification
- Kingdom: Animalia
- Phylum: Arthropoda
- Class: Insecta
- Order: Coleoptera
- Suborder: Adephaga
- Family: Carabidae
- Genus: Tetragonoderus
- Species: T. sinuosus

Binomial name
- Tetragonoderus sinuosus Chaudoir, 1876

Species of beetle

Tetragonoderus sinuosus is a species of beetle in the family Carabidae. It was described by Chaudoir in 1876.
