= Tetragonoderus microthorax =

Scientific classification
- Kingdom: Animalia
- Phylum: Arthropoda
- Class: Insecta
- Order: Coleoptera
- Suborder: Adephaga
- Family: Carabidae
- Genus: Tetragonoderus
- Species: T. microthorax

Binomial name
- Tetragonoderus microthorax Jian & Tian, 2009

Species of beetle

Tetragonoderus microthorax is a species of beetle in the family Carabidae. It was described by Jian & Tian in 2009.
