= Microlestes aenigmaticus =

Scientific classification
- Domain: Eukaryota
- Kingdom: Animalia
- Phylum: Arthropoda
- Class: Insecta
- Order: Coleoptera
- Suborder: Adephaga
- Family: Carabidae
- Genus: Microlestes
- Species: M. aenigmaticus

Binomial name
- Microlestes aenigmaticus Mateu, 1963

Species of beetle

Microlestes aenigmaticus is a species of ground beetle in the family Carabidae.

== Subspecies ==
These two subspecies belong to the species Microlestes aenigmaticus:

- Microlestes aenigmaticus aenigmaticus Mateu, 1963
- Microlestes aenigmaticus globulosus Mateu, 1963
