= Tetragonoderus linealis =

Scientific classification
- Kingdom: Animalia
- Phylum: Arthropoda
- Class: Insecta
- Order: Coleoptera
- Suborder: Adephaga
- Family: Carabidae
- Genus: Tetragonoderus
- Species: T. linealis

Binomial name
- Tetragonoderus linealis Andrewes, 1938

Species of beetle

Tetragonoderus linealis is a species of beetle in the family Carabidae. It was described by Andrewes in 1938.
