= Tetragonoderus assuanensis =

Scientific classification
- Kingdom: Animalia
- Phylum: Arthropoda
- Class: Insecta
- Order: Coleoptera
- Suborder: Adephaga
- Family: Carabidae
- Genus: Tetragonoderus
- Species: T. assuanensis

Binomial name
- Tetragonoderus assuanensis Mjuberg, 1905

Species of beetle

Tetragonoderus assuanensis is a species of beetle in the family Carabidae. It was described by Mjuberg in 1905.
