= Tetragonoderus andrewesi =

Scientific classification
- Kingdom: Animalia
- Phylum: Arthropoda
- Class: Insecta
- Order: Coleoptera
- Suborder: Adephaga
- Family: Carabidae
- Genus: Tetragonoderus
- Species: T. andrewesi

Binomial name
- Tetragonoderus andrewesi Emden, 1934

Species of beetle

Tetragonoderus andrewesi is a species of beetle in the family Carabidae. It was described by Emden in 1934.
