= Dolichoctis aculeoides =

Scientific classification
- Domain: Eukaryota
- Kingdom: Animalia
- Phylum: Arthropoda
- Class: Insecta
- Order: Coleoptera
- Suborder: Adephaga
- Family: Carabidae
- Genus: Dolichoctis
- Species: D. aculeoides

Binomial name
- Dolichoctis aculeoides Baehr, 1999

Species of beetle

Dolichoctis aculeoides is a ground beetle species first described by Baehr in 1999.
