= Tetragonoderus leprieuri =

Scientific classification
- Domain: Eukaryota
- Kingdom: Animalia
- Phylum: Arthropoda
- Class: Insecta
- Order: Coleoptera
- Suborder: Adephaga
- Family: Carabidae
- Subtribe: Cyclosomina
- Genus: Tetragonoderus
- Species: T. leprieuri

Binomial name
- Tetragonoderus leprieuri Gory, 1833

Synonyms
- Tetragonoderus leprieurii; Tetragonoderus aericollis

Species of beetle

Tetragonoderus leprieuri is a species in the beetle family Carabidae. It is found in Africa.
