= Tetragonoderus bastardi =

Scientific classification
- Kingdom: Animalia
- Phylum: Arthropoda
- Class: Insecta
- Order: Coleoptera
- Suborder: Adephaga
- Family: Carabidae
- Genus: Tetragonoderus
- Species: T. bastardi

Binomial name
- Tetragonoderus bastardi Alluaud, 1897

Species of beetle

Tetragonoderus bastardi is a species of beetle in the family Carabidae. It was described by Alluaud in 1897.
