= Tetragonoderus aegypticus =

Scientific classification
- Kingdom: Animalia
- Phylum: Arthropoda
- Class: Insecta
- Order: Coleoptera
- Suborder: Adephaga
- Family: Carabidae
- Genus: Tetragonoderus
- Species: T. aegypticus

Binomial name
- Tetragonoderus aegypticus Jedlicka, 1952

Species of beetle

Tetragonoderus aegypticus is a species of beetle in the family Carabidae. It was described by Jedlicka in 1952.
