= Tetragonoderus chaudoiri =

Scientific classification
- Kingdom: Animalia
- Phylum: Arthropoda
- Class: Insecta
- Order: Coleoptera
- Suborder: Adephaga
- Family: Carabidae
- Genus: Tetragonoderus
- Species: T. chaudoiri

Binomial name
- Tetragonoderus chaudoiri Liebke, 1928

Species of beetle

Tetragonoderus chaudoiri is a species of beetle in the family Carabidae. It was described by Liebke in 1928.
