= Tetragonoderus leleupi =

Scientific classification
- Kingdom: Animalia
- Phylum: Arthropoda
- Class: Insecta
- Order: Coleoptera
- Suborder: Adephaga
- Family: Carabidae
- Genus: Tetragonoderus
- Species: T. leleupi

Binomial name
- Tetragonoderus leleupi Basilewsky, 1956

Species of beetle

Tetragonoderus leleupi is a species of beetle in the family Carabidae. It was described by Basilewsky in 1956.
