= Thierry Deuve =

French entomologist

Thierry Deuve (born 29 August 1956) is a French entomologist.

The moth genus Deuveia is named for Deuve, as are the beetle species Agonum deuvei, Carabus deuvei, Ceruchus deuvei, Ctenostoma deuvei, Guiaphaenops deuvei, Pogonostoma deuvei, Tetracha deuvei and Tetragonoderus deuvei.

== Books ==
- 1988 – Etudes morphologiques et phylogénétiques sur l'abdomen et les genitalia ectodermiques femelles des Coléoptères Adephaga
- 1991 – La nomenclature taxonomique du genre Carabus
- 1993 – L'abdomen et les genitalia des femelles de coléoptères Adephaga
- 1994 – Une classification du genre Carabus
- 1997 – Catalogue des Carabini et Cychrini de Chine
- 2001 [editor] – Origin of the Hexapoda
- 2004 – Illustrated catalogue of the genus Carabus of the world (Coleoptera, Carabidae)
- 2010 – Liste Blumenthal 2010: liste des taxons valides du genre Carabus
- 2013 – Cychrus, Calosoma et Carabus de Chine
- 2021 - Carabus of the World
- 2023 - A quoi songe donc ce printemps
