= Hermann Schmidt-Göbel =

Austrian Physician

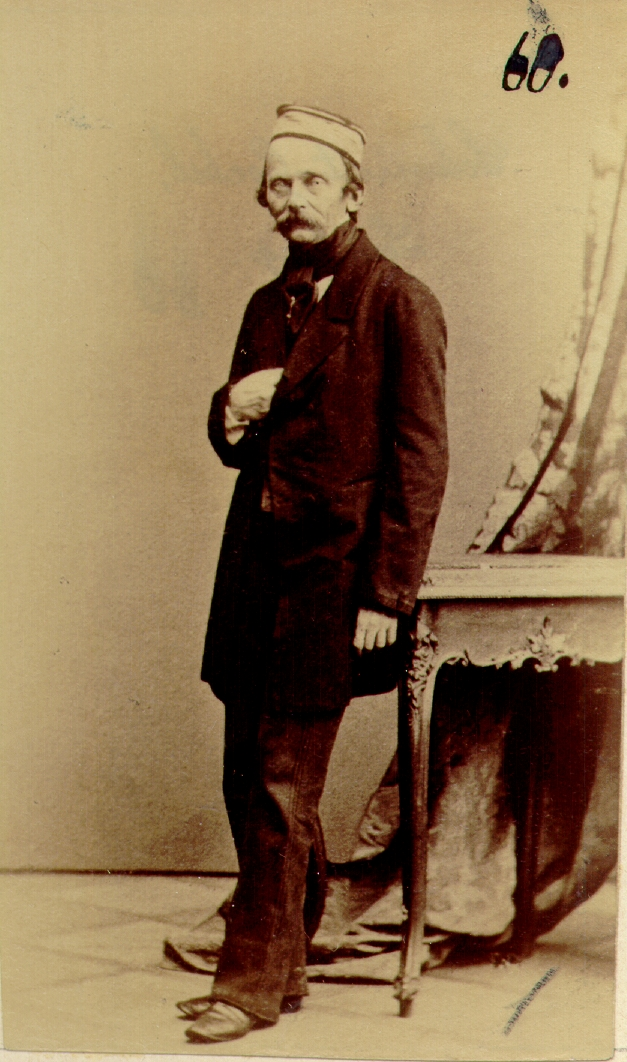
Photo from the archives of Hans Malicky, Linz

Hermann Maximilian Schmidt-Göbel (11 August 1809 – 17 August 1882) was an Austrian medical doctor and entomologist. He took a special interest in the rove beetle subfamily Pselaphinae and was a professor at the University of Lviv from 1870. The jewel beetle Agrilus schmidtgoebeli was named after him.

== Life and work ==
Schmidt-Göbel was born in Lviv, the son of liquor manufacturer Franz and Johanna née Pöbele. He studied medicine at the University of Prague and his doctoral thesis in 1836 was on the Pselaphidae of Prague. He lived in Prague from 1839 to 1842 he worked as an assistant professor at the University of Prague. He worked at first on the beetles of Burma at the Prague Museum collected by Johann Wilhelm Helfer and published Fauna Coleopterorum Birmaniae in 1846. He married Emma Schmidt née Jöndl in 1847. In 1849 he taught zoology at the University of Vienna and became a full professor at the University of Olomouc. He moved to the University of Lviv in 1851. In 1881 he published a book on the harmful and beneficial insects of Austria. He served as rector in 1869-70 and reached the age of retirement in 1875. He continued to work as an emeritus professor at the University of Lviv until his death in Klosterneuburg near Vienna.
