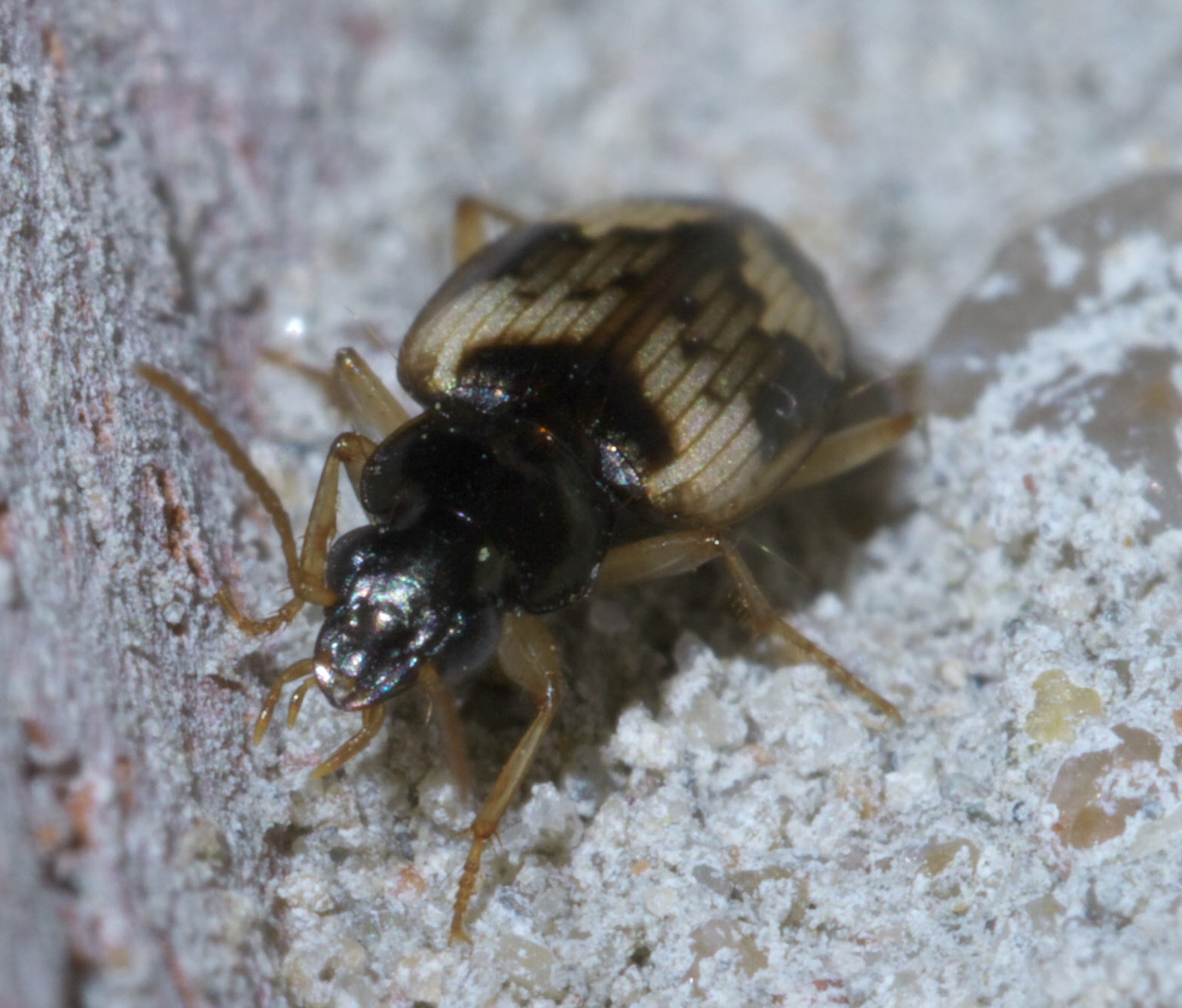
- Tetragonoderus

Scientific classification
- Domain: Eukaryota
- Kingdom: Animalia
- Phylum: Arthropoda
- Class: Insecta
- Order: Coleoptera
- Suborder: Adephaga
- Family: Carabidae
- Subfamily: Lebiinae
- Tribe: Cyclosomini; Laporte, 1834

Subtribes
- Corsyrina Ganglbauer Cyclosomina Laporte, 1834 Graphipterina Latreille, 1802 Masoreina Chaudoir, 1871 Nemotarsina Bates, 1883

= Cyclosomini =

Tribe of beetles

Cyclosomini is a tribe of ground beetles in the family Carabidae. There are about 18 genera and more than 490 described species in Cyclosomini.

== Genera ==
These 18 genera belong to the tribe Cyclosomini:

Anaulacus W.S.MacLeay, 1825
Atlantomasoreus Mateu, 1984
Corsyra Dejean, 1825
Cyclosomus Latreille, 1829
Discoptera Semenov, 1889
Graphipterus Latreille, 1802
Leuropus Andrewes, 1947
Lophidius Dejean, 1831
Masoreus Dejean, 1821
Mnuphorus Chaudoir, 1873
Nemotarsus LeConte, 1853
Odontomasoreus Darlington, 1968
Piezia Brullé, 1834
Sarothrocrepis Chaudoir, 1850
Somoplatodes Basilewsky, 1986
Somoplatus Dejean, 1829
Tetragonoderus Dejean, 1829
Trichopiezia Nègre, 1955
