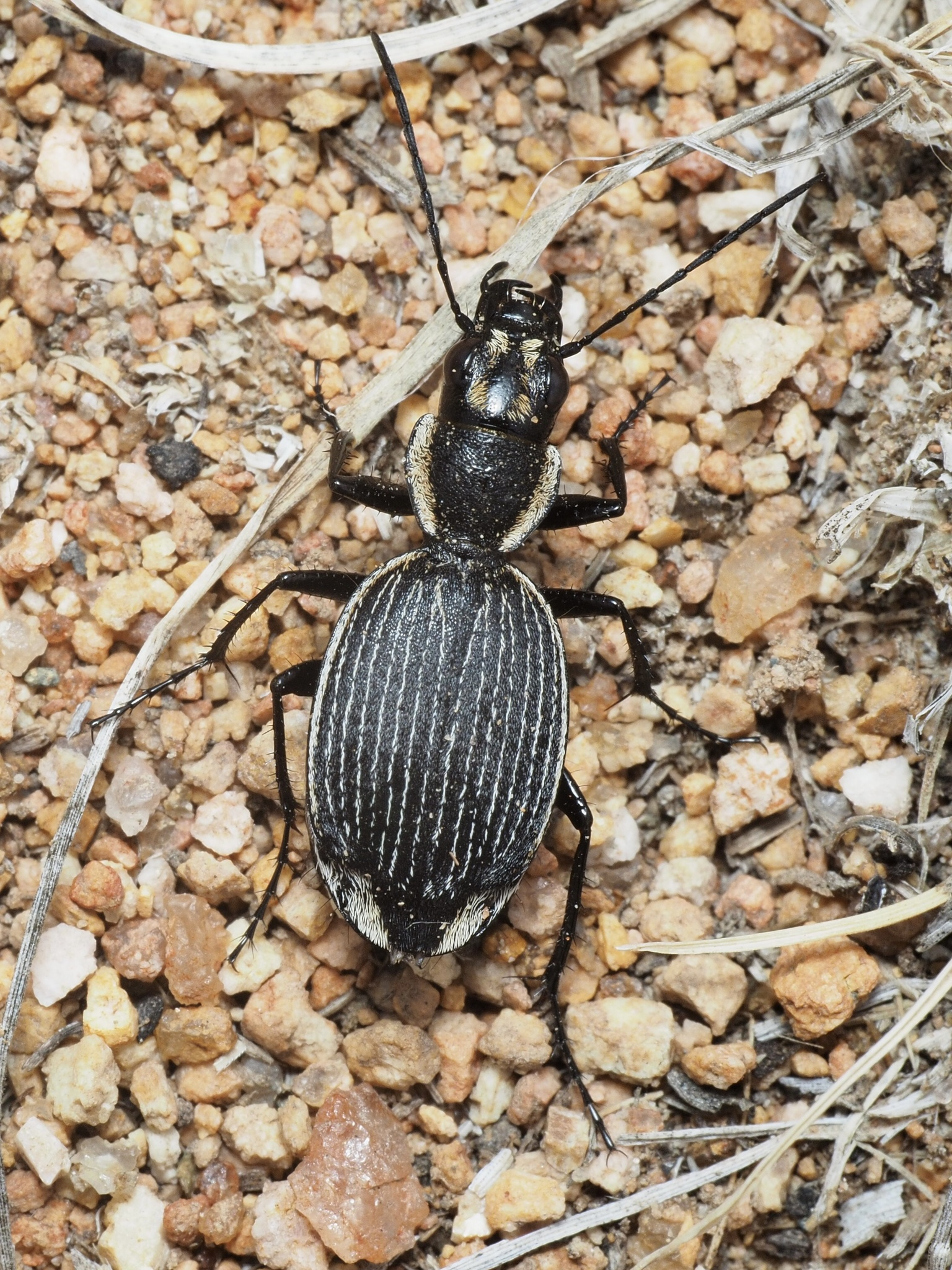
- Graphipterus lineolatus, Zimbabwe

Scientific classification
- Kingdom: Animalia
- Phylum: Arthropoda
- Class: Insecta
- Order: Coleoptera
- Suborder: Adephaga
- Family: Carabidae
- Subfamily: Lebiinae
- Tribe: Cyclosomini
- Subtribe: Graphipterina
- Genus: Graphipterus
- Species: G. lineolatus

Binomial name
- Graphipterus lineolatus (Boheman, 1848)

Synonyms
- Piezia lineolata Boheman, 1848

= Graphipterus lineolatus =

Species of beetles

Graphipterus lineolatus, the lined velvet ground beetle, is a species of ground beetle in the family Carabidae. It is found in southern Africa.
