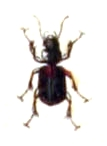
- Masoreus wetterhallii

Scientific classification
- Kingdom: Animalia
- Phylum: Arthropoda
- Class: Insecta
- Order: Coleoptera
- Suborder: Adephaga
- Family: Carabidae
- Subfamily: Lebiinae
- Tribe: Cyclosomini
- Subtribe: Masoreina
- Genus: Masoreus; Dejean, 1821

Synonyms
- Mozoreus Motschoulsky, 1845

= Masoreus =

Genus of beetles

Masoreus is a genus in the ground beetle family Carabidae. There are about seven described species in Masoreus.

== Species ==
These seven species belong to the genus Masoreus:

- Masoreus aegyptiacus Dejean, 1828 (Mediterranean region, Saudi Arabia)
- Masoreus affinis Chaudoir, 1843 (Mediterranean region, Canary Islands)
- Masoreus alticola Wollaston, 1864 (Canary Islands)
- Masoreus grandis Zimmermann, 1832 (Ethiopia)
- Masoreus orientalis Dejean, 1828 (northern Europe, southern Asia)
- Masoreus saharensis Mateu, 1984 (Morocco)
- Masoreus wetterhallii (Gyllenhal, 1813) (Palearctic)
