= Odontomasoreus =

Scientific classification
- Domain: Eukaryota
- Kingdom: Animalia
- Phylum: Arthropoda
- Class: Insecta
- Order: Coleoptera
- Suborder: Adephaga
- Family: Carabidae
- Tribe: Cyclosomini
- Subtribe: Masoreina
- Genus: Odontomasoreus; Darlington, 1968
- Species: O. humeralis

Binomial name
- Odontomasoreus humeralis Darlington, 1968

Genus of beetles

Odontomasoreus is a genus in the ground beetle family Carabidae. This genus has a single species, Odontomasoreus humeralis. It is found in Indonesia and New Guinea.
