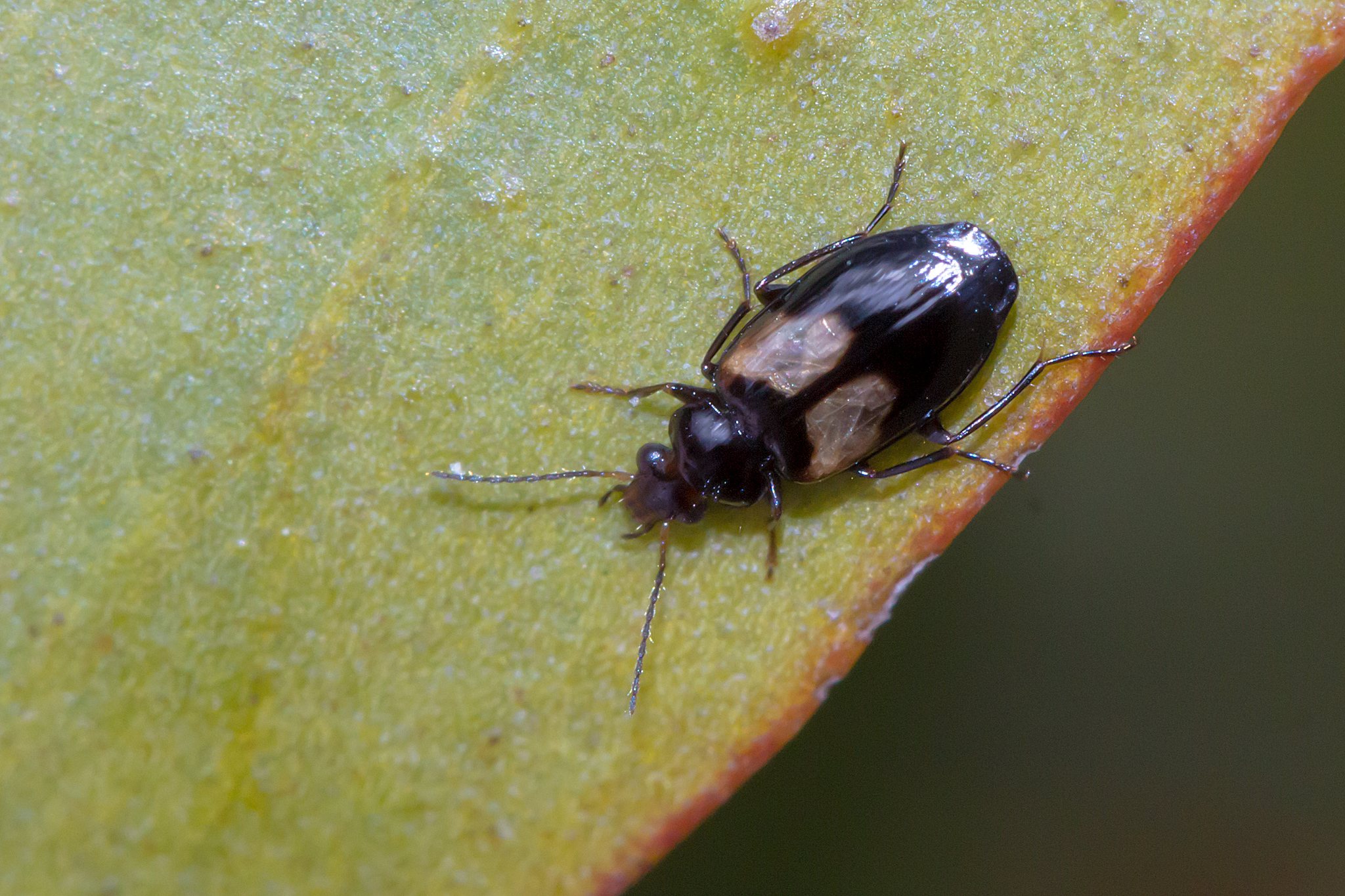
- Sarothrocrepis civica, Australia

Scientific classification
- Kingdom: Animalia
- Phylum: Arthropoda
- Class: Insecta
- Order: Coleoptera
- Suborder: Adephaga
- Family: Carabidae
- Subfamily: Lebiinae
- Tribe: Cyclosomini
- Genus: Sarothrocrepis; Chaudoir, 1850

= Sarothrocrepis =

Genus of beetles

Sarothrocrepis is a genus in the beetle family Carabidae. There are more than 110 described species in Sarothrocrepis, found mainly in Australia, but also in Indonesia, New Guinea, Papua, and the Philippines.

== Species ==
These 119 species belong to the genus Sarothrocrepis:

- Sarothrocrepis adusta Baehr, 2018 (Australia)
- Sarothrocrepis anchora Baehr, 2018 (Australia)
- Sarothrocrepis andrewesi Jedlicka, 1934 (Philippines)
- Sarothrocrepis angulipennis Baehr, 2018 (Australia)
- Sarothrocrepis archerensis Baehr, 2018 (Australia)
- Sarothrocrepis athertonensis Baehr, 2018 (Australia)
- Sarothrocrepis atriceps Baehr, 2018 (Australia)
- Sarothrocrepis baitetae Baehr, 2018 (New Guinea and Papua)
- Sarothrocrepis basinigra Baehr, 2018 (Australia)
- Sarothrocrepis benefica (Newman, 1842) (Australia)
- Sarothrocrepis bickeli Baehr, 2018 (Australia)
- Sarothrocrepis bribieana Baehr, 2018 (Australia)
- Sarothrocrepis brittoni Baehr, 2018 (Australia)
- Sarothrocrepis callidiformis Baehr, 2018 (Australia)
- Sarothrocrepis cantrelli Baehr, 2018 (Australia)
- Sarothrocrepis carnavona Baehr, 2018 (Australia)
- Sarothrocrepis cheesmannae Baehr, 2018 (Indonesia and New Guinea)
- Sarothrocrepis civica (Newman, 1840) (Australia)
- Sarothrocrepis corticalis (Fabricius, 1801) (Australia)
- Sarothrocrepis distinguenda Baehr, 2018 (Australia)
- Sarothrocrepis doyeni Baehr, 2018 (Australia)
- Sarothrocrepis elegans (Blackburn, 1901) (Australia)
- Sarothrocrepis eudloensis Baehr, 2018 (Australia)
- Sarothrocrepis expansicollis Baehr, 2018 (Australia)
- Sarothrocrepis fasciata W.J.MacLeay, 1871 (Australia)
- Sarothrocrepis fragilis (Blackburn, 1901) (Australia)
- Sarothrocrepis gravis (Blackburn, 1901) (Australia)
- Sarothrocrepis gressitti Baehr, 2018 (New Guinea and Papua)
- Sarothrocrepis heathlandica Baehr, 2018 (Australia)
- Sarothrocrepis hippocrepis Baehr, 2018 (Australia)
- Sarothrocrepis howea Baehr, 2018 (Australia)
- Sarothrocrepis humeralis Baehr, 2018 (Australia)
- Sarothrocrepis humerata Sloane, 1900 (Australia)
- Sarothrocrepis immaculata Baehr, 2018 (Australia)
- Sarothrocrepis inquinata (Erichson, 1842) (Australia)
- Sarothrocrepis integra Baehr, 2018 (Australia)
- Sarothrocrepis javanica Emden, 1937 (Indonesia)
- Sarothrocrepis kalbarri Baehr, 2018 (Australia)
- Sarothrocrepis keepensis Baehr, 2018 (Australia)
- Sarothrocrepis kimberleyana Baehr, 2018 (Australia)
- Sarothrocrepis krikkeni Baehr, 2018 (Indonesia)
- Sarothrocrepis lacertensis Baehr, 2018 (Australia)
- Sarothrocrepis lacustris Baehr, 2018 (Australia)
- Sarothrocrepis lamingtonensis Baehr, 2018 (Australia)
- Sarothrocrepis laticollis Baehr, 2018 (Australia)
- Sarothrocrepis latior Baehr, 2018 (Australia)
- Sarothrocrepis latipalpis Baehr, 2018 (Australia)
- Sarothrocrepis lemannae Baehr, 2018 (Australia)
- Sarothrocrepis liturata W.J.MacLeay, 1888 (Australia)
- Sarothrocrepis longitarsis Baehr, 2018 (Australia)
- Sarothrocrepis luctuosa (Newman, 1842) (Australia)
- Sarothrocrepis macularis Baehr, 2018 (Australia)
- Sarothrocrepis major Baehr, 2018 (Australia)
- Sarothrocrepis marginalis Baehr, 2018 (Australia)
- Sarothrocrepis mastersii W.J.MacLeay, 1871 (Australia)
- Sarothrocrepis melanopyga Baehr, 2018 (Australia)
- Sarothrocrepis m-fascigerum Baehr, 2018 (Australia)
- Sarothrocrepis missai Baehr, 2018 (New Guinea and Papua)
- Sarothrocrepis m-maculatum Baehr, 2018 (Australia)
- Sarothrocrepis m-nigrum Jordan, 1894 (Indonesia)
- Sarothrocrepis monteithi Baehr, 2018 (Australia)
- Sarothrocrepis moreheadensis Baehr, 2018 (Australia)
- Sarothrocrepis moretona Baehr, 2018 (Australia)
- Sarothrocrepis nebulosa Baehr, 2018 (Australia)
- Sarothrocrepis nelsonensis Baehr, 2018 (Australia)
- Sarothrocrepis nigricincta Baehr, 2018 (Australia)
- Sarothrocrepis nigricollis Baehr, 2018 (Australia)
- Sarothrocrepis nigromarginata Baehr, 2018 (Australia)
- Sarothrocrepis nitens Baehr, 2018 (Australia)
- Sarothrocrepis notabilis W.J.MacLeay, 1888 (Australia)
- Sarothrocrepis notata W.J.MacLeay, 1888 (Australia)
- Sarothrocrepis novaecaledoniae Baehr, 2018 (New Caledonia)
- Sarothrocrepis obsoleta (Blackburn, 1892) (Australia)
- Sarothrocrepis obtusa Sloane, 1917 (Australia)
- Sarothrocrepis occidentalis Baehr, 2018 (Australia)
- Sarothrocrepis oenpelli Baehr, 2018 (Australia)
- Sarothrocrepis ornata Baehr, 2018 (Australia)
- Sarothrocrepis ovipennis Baehr, 2018 (Australia)
- Sarothrocrepis pallida W.J.MacLeay, 1871 (Australia)
- Sarothrocrepis palumae Baehr, 2018 (Australia)
- Sarothrocrepis papua Darlington, 1968 (New Guinea and Papua)
- Sarothrocrepis paraburdoo Baehr, 2018 (Australia)
- Sarothrocrepis paracorticalis Baehr, 2018 (Australia)
- Sarothrocrepis parvicollis (Blackburn, 1894) (Australia)
- Sarothrocrepis peninsulae Baehr, 2018 (Australia)
- Sarothrocrepis permutata Baehr, 2018 (Australia)
- Sarothrocrepis piceitarsis Baehr, 2018 (Australia)
- Sarothrocrepis poonae Baehr, 2018 (Australia)
- Sarothrocrepis promontoryi Baehr, 2018 (Australia)
- Sarothrocrepis pronotalis Baehr, 2018 (Australia)
- Sarothrocrepis psittacina Baehr, 2018 (Australia)
- Sarothrocrepis queenslandica Baehr, 2018 (Australia)
- Sarothrocrepis riedeli Baehr, 2018 (Indonesia, New Guinea, Papua)
- Sarothrocrepis sagittaria Baehr, 2018 (Australia)
- Sarothrocrepis scripta Baehr, 2018 (Australia)
- Sarothrocrepis serriplaga Baehr, 2018 (Australia)
- Sarothrocrepis setulosa Sloane, 1911 (Australia)
- Sarothrocrepis shannonensis Baehr, 2018 (Australia)
- Sarothrocrepis similis Baehr, 2018 (Australia)
- Sarothrocrepis simulans Baehr, 2018 (Australia)
- Sarothrocrepis sinuata Baehr, 2018 (Australia)
- Sarothrocrepis sinuatifasciata Baehr, 2018 (Australia)
- Sarothrocrepis sparsepilosa Baehr, 2018 (Australia)
- Sarothrocrepis storeyi Baehr, 2018 (Australia)
- Sarothrocrepis suavis Blackburn, 1890 (Australia)
- Sarothrocrepis sundaica Baehr, 2018 (Indonesia)
- Sarothrocrepis suturalis Baehr, 2018 (Australia)
- Sarothrocrepis tarsalis Baehr, 2018 (Australia)
- Sarothrocrepis tolgae Baehr, 2018 (Australia)
- Sarothrocrepis transversa Baehr, 2018 (Australia)
- Sarothrocrepis unimaculata Baehr, 2018 (Australia)
- Sarothrocrepis variegata Baehr, 2018 (Australia)
- Sarothrocrepis vicina Baehr, 2018 (Australia)
- Sarothrocrepis warrumbungle Baehr, 2018 (Australia)
- Sarothrocrepis webbensis Baehr, 2018 (Australia)
- Sarothrocrepis wellenslyana Baehr, 2018 (Australia)
- Sarothrocrepis werrikimbe Baehr, 2018 (Australia)
- Sarothrocrepis westralis Baehr, 2018 (Australia)
- Sarothrocrepis wilcanniae Baehr, 2018 (Australia)
