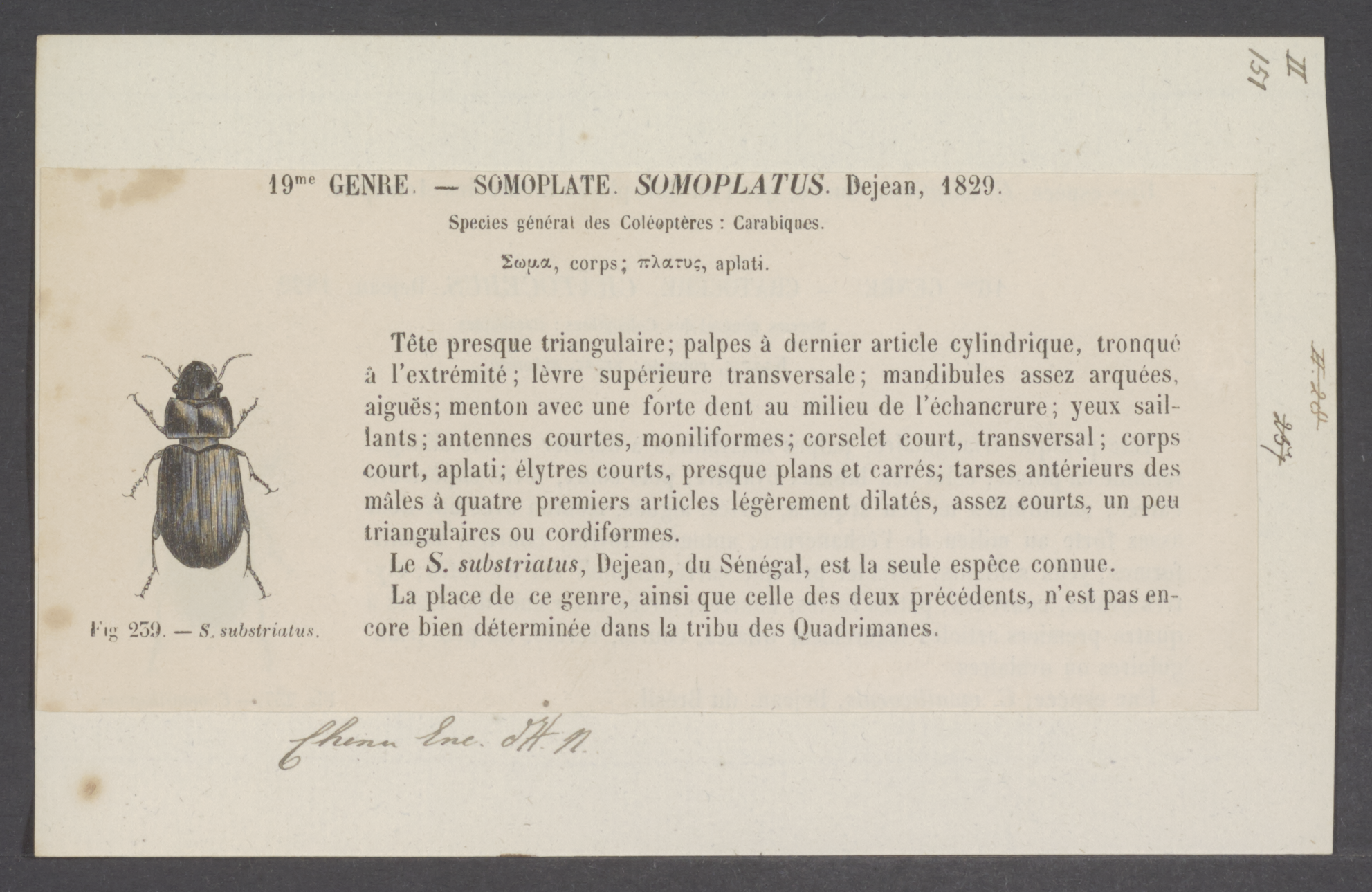

Scientific classification
- Kingdom: Animalia
- Phylum: Arthropoda
- Clade: Pancrustacea
- Class: Insecta
- Order: Coleoptera
- Suborder: Adephaga
- Family: Carabidae
- Subfamily: Lebiinae
- Tribe: Cyclosomini
- Subtribe: Masoreina
- Genus: Somoplatus; Dejean, 1829

Synonyms
- Paralophidius Basilewsky, 1986

= Somoplatus =

Genus of beetles

Somoplatus is a genus of ground beetles in the family Carabidae. There are about 15 described species in Somoplatus, found in Africa and Europe.

== Species ==
These 15 species belong to the genus Somoplatus:

- Somoplatus amplicollis Basilewsky, 1986 (West Africa)
- Somoplatus brevicollis (Dejean, 1831) (West Africa)
- Somoplatus depilis Schüle, 2009 (Ivory Coast)
- Somoplatus elongatus Burgeon, 1936 (West Africa)
- Somoplatus fulvus Mulsant & Godart, 1867 (Europe, Africa)
- Somoplatus genierorum Schüle, 2009 (Burkina Faso)
- Somoplatus girardi Basilewsky, 1986 (West Africa)
- Somoplatus guineensis Basilewsky, 1986 (Guinea)
- Somoplatus hospes Andrewes, 1933 (India)
- Somoplatus ivoirensis Schüle, 2009 (Ivory Coast)
- Somoplatus morettoi Schüle, 2009 (Ivory Coast)
- Somoplatus pilicollis Schüle, 2009 (West Africa)
- Somoplatus septentrionalis Burgeon, 1936 (Sub-Saharan Africa)
- Somoplatus simillimus Basilewsky, 1986 (Sub-Saharan Africa)
- Somoplatus substriatus Dejean, 1829 (Europe, Africa)
