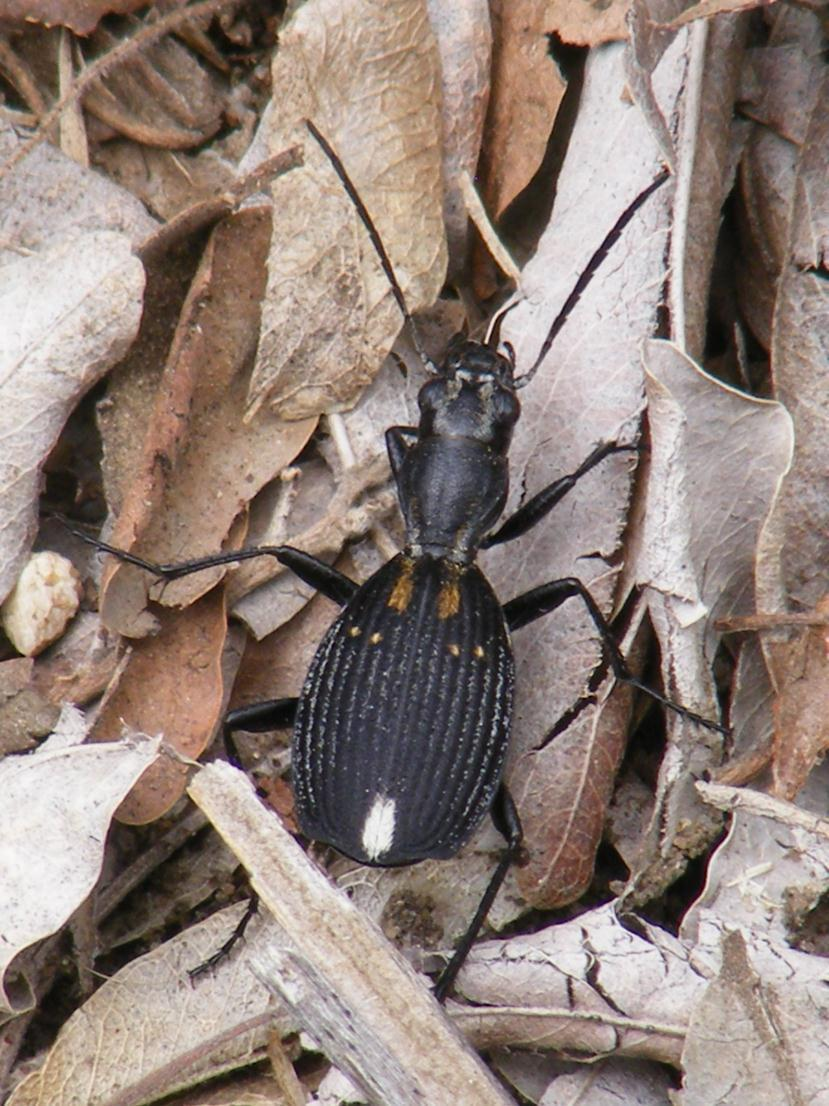
- Piezia angusticollis, South Africa

Scientific classification
- Domain: Eukaryota
- Kingdom: Animalia
- Phylum: Arthropoda
- Class: Insecta
- Order: Coleoptera
- Suborder: Adephaga
- Family: Carabidae
- Subfamily: Lebiinae
- Tribe: Cyclosomini
- Subtribe: Graphipterina
- Genus: Piezia; Brullé, 1834

= Piezia =

Genus of beetles

Piezia is a genus in the ground beetle family Carabidae. There are about 18 described species in Piezia, found in Africa.

== Species ==
These 18 species belong to the genus Piezia:

- Piezia algoensis Péringuey, 1896 (Mozambique, Botswana, Namibia, South Africa)
- Piezia alternata Burgeon, 1929 (DR Congo, Tanzania, Zambia, Malawi)
- Piezia angulata Burgeon, 1929 (Tanzania)
- Piezia angusticollis Boheman, 1848 (Angola, Mozambique, Zimbabwe, Botswana, Namibia, South Africa)
- Piezia apicemaculata Basilewsky, 1981 (Mozambique and Zimbabwe)
- Piezia aptinoides Perroud, 1847 (Botswana and South Africa)
- Piezia axillaris Brullé, 1834 (Botswana, Namibia, South Africa)
- Piezia beirensis Burgeon, 1929 (Mozambique)
- Piezia emarginata Fairmaire, 1887 (DR Congo, Kenya, Tanzania)
- Piezia kuntzeni Burgeon, 1929 (Uganda, Burundi, Tanzania)
- Piezia licita Péringuey, 1898 (Zimbabwe)
- Piezia livingstoni Chaudoir, 1870 (Tanzania, Malawi, Mozambique)
- Piezia mashuna Péringuey, 1896 (Zambia and Zimbabwe)
- Piezia pilosevittata J.Thomson, 1857 (Mozambique and South Africa)
- Piezia quinquesignata Fairmaire, 1887 (Kenya and Tanzania)
- Piezia selousi Péringuey, 1896 (DR Congo, Tanzania, Zambia, Malawi, Mozambique, Zimbabwe)
- Piezia spinulae (Bertoloni, 1849) (Mozambique)
- Piezia suturata Burgeon, 1929 (Mozambique)
