= Anaulacus =

Scientific classification
- Domain: Eukaryota
- Kingdom: Animalia
- Phylum: Arthropoda
- Class: Insecta
- Order: Coleoptera
- Suborder: Adephaga
- Family: Carabidae
- Subfamily: Lebiinae
- Tribe: Cyclosomini
- Subtribe: Masoreina
- Genus: Anaulacus; W.S.MacLeay, 1825

Subgenera
- Aephnidius W.S.MacLeay, 1825; Anaulacus W.S.MacLeay, 1825; Apostolus Ball & Shpeley, 2002; Caphora Schmidt-Goebel, 1846; Macracanthus Chaudoir, 1846; Microus Chaudoir, 1876

Genus of beetles

Anaulacus is a genus in the beetle family Carabidae. There are more than 30 described species in Anaulacus.

== Species ==
These 39 species belong to the genus Anaulacus:

- Anaulacus adelioides W.S.MacLeay, 1825
- Anaulacus afganus (Jedlicka, 1956)
- Anaulacus africanus (Alluaud, 1915)
- Anaulacus ampliusculus (Chaudoir, 1876)
- Anaulacus arrowi (Jedlicka, 1934)
- Anaulacus ashei Ball & Shpeley, 2002
- Anaulacus batesi (Chaudoir, 1876)
- Anaulacus bonariensis (Chaudoir, 1876)
- Anaulacus capensis Péringuey, 1896
- Anaulacus carinatipennis Péringuey, 1908
- Anaulacus ciliatus (Mutchler in Darlington, 1934)
- Anaulacus erwini Ball & Shpeley, 2002
- Anaulacus exiguus Ball & Shpeley, 2002
- Anaulacus fasciatus (Schmidt-Goebel, 1846)
- Anaulacus fuscipennis (Schmidt-Goebel, 1846)
- Anaulacus guineensis (Chaudoir, 1876)
- Anaulacus humeralis Ball & Shpeley, 2002
- Anaulacus humilis (Schmidt-Goebel, 1846)
- Anaulacus hypolithoides (Vinson, 1935)
- Anaulacus madagascariensis (Chaudoir, 1850)
- Anaulacus mcclevei Ball & Shpeley, 2002
- Anaulacus mocquerysi (Chaudoir, 1878)
- Anaulacus monilis (Raffray, 1886)
- Anaulacus opaculus (Zimmermann, 1832)
- Anaulacus piceolus (Chaudoir, 1876)
- Anaulacus pleuronectes (Zimmermann, 1832)
- Anaulacus quadrimaculatus (Schmidt-Goebel, 1846)
- Anaulacus rubidus (Andrewes, 1922)
- Anaulacus ruficornis (Chaudoir, 1850)
- Anaulacus rutilus (Schaum, 1863)
- Anaulacus sericatus (Chaudoir, 1846)
- Anaulacus sericipennis W.S.MacLeay, 1825
- Anaulacus siamensis (Chaudoir, 1876)
- Anaulacus sphaeridioides (Burgeon, 1936)
- Anaulacus submaculatus (Bates, 1892)
- Anaulacus thoracicus Ball & Shpeley, 2002
- Anaulacus tuberculatus (Chaudoir, 1876)
- Anaulacus westwoodi (Raffray, 1886)
- Anaulacus whiteheadi Ball & Shpeley, 2002
