= Atlantomasoreus =

Scientific classification
- Domain: Eukaryota
- Kingdom: Animalia
- Phylum: Arthropoda
- Class: Insecta
- Order: Coleoptera
- Suborder: Adephaga
- Family: Carabidae
- Subfamily: Lebiinae
- Tribe: Cyclosomini
- Subtribe: Masoreina
- Genus: Atlantomasoreus; Mateu, 1984

Genus of beetles

Atlantomasoreus is a genus in the beetle family Carabidae. There are at least three described species in Atlantomasoreus.

== Species ==
These three species belong to the genus Atlantomasoreus:

- Atlantomasoreus desertorum (Escalera, 1914) (Morocco)
- Atlantomasoreus groneri (Assmann; Renan & Wrase, 2015) (Israel)
- Atlantomasoreus orbipennis (Bedel, 1904) (Morocco)
