= Nemotarsus elegans =

Scientific classification
- Domain: Eukaryota
- Kingdom: Animalia
- Phylum: Arthropoda
- Class: Insecta
- Order: Coleoptera
- Suborder: Adephaga
- Family: Carabidae
- Genus: Nemotarsus
- Species: N. elegans

Binomial name
- Nemotarsus elegans LeConte, 1853

Species of beetle

Nemotarsus elegans is a species of ground beetle in the family Carabidae. It is found in North America.
