= Somoplatodes =

Scientific classification
- Domain: Eukaryota
- Kingdom: Animalia
- Phylum: Arthropoda
- Class: Insecta
- Order: Coleoptera
- Suborder: Adephaga
- Family: Carabidae
- Subfamily: Lebiinae
- Tribe: Cyclosomini
- Subtribe: Masoreina
- Genus: Somoplatodes; Basilewsky, 1986

Genus of beetles

Somoplatodes is a genus in the ground beetle family Carabidae. There are at least two described species in Somoplatodes, found in Africa.

== Species ==
These two species belong to the genus Somoplatodes:

- Somoplatodes kuntzeni Basilewsky, 1986 (Guinea, Ivory Coast, Ghana, DR Congo, Tanzania)
- Somoplatodes multisetosus (Burgeon, 1936) (Ivory Coast, Nigeria, DR Congo, Angola)
