= Leuropus =

Scientific classification
- Domain: Eukaryota
- Kingdom: Animalia
- Phylum: Arthropoda
- Class: Insecta
- Order: Coleoptera
- Suborder: Adephaga
- Family: Carabidae
- Tribe: Cyclosomini
- Subtribe: Masoreina
- Genus: Leuropus; Andrewes, 1947
- Species: L. rubellus

Binomial name
- Leuropus rubellus Andrewes, 1947

Genus of beetles

Leuropus is a genus in the ground beetle family Carabidae. This genus has a single species, Leuropus rubellus. It is found in Myanmar.
