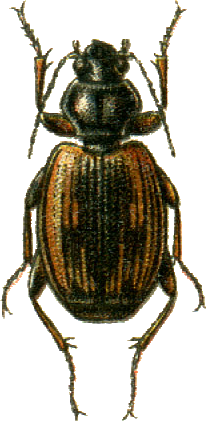
- Corsyra fusula

Scientific classification
- Kingdom: Animalia
- Phylum: Arthropoda
- Class: Insecta
- Order: Coleoptera
- Suborder: Adephaga
- Family: Carabidae
- Subfamily: Lebiinae
- Tribe: Cyclosomini
- Subtribe: Corsyrina
- Genus: Corsyra; Dejean, 1825
- Species: C. fusula

Binomial name
- Corsyra fusula (Fischer von Waldheim, 1820)

Synonyms
- Corsera Fischer von Waldheim, 1828

= Corsyra =

Genus of beetles

Corsyra is a genus in the ground beetle family Carabidae. This genus has a single species, Corsyra fusula. It is found in Kazakhstan, Kyrgyzstan, China, Russia, and Mongolia.
