= Nemotarsus rhombifer =

Scientific classification
- Kingdom: Animalia
- Phylum: Arthropoda
- Class: Insecta
- Order: Coleoptera
- Suborder: Adephaga
- Family: Carabidae
- Genus: Nemotarsus
- Species: N. rhombifer

Binomial name
- Nemotarsus rhombifer Bates, 1883

Species of beetle

Nemotarsus rhombifer is a species of ground beetle belonging to the family Carabidae. It is found in Central America and North America.
