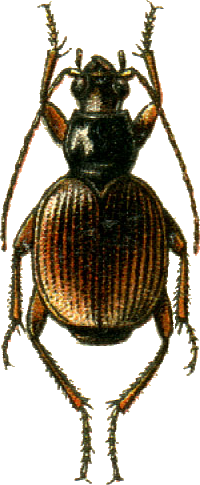
- Discoptera komarowi

Scientific classification
- Domain: Eukaryota
- Kingdom: Animalia
- Phylum: Arthropoda
- Class: Insecta
- Order: Coleoptera
- Suborder: Adephaga
- Family: Carabidae
- Subfamily: Lebiinae
- Tribe: Cyclosomini
- Subtribe: Corsyrina
- Genus: Discoptera; Semenov, 1889

Synonyms
- Discopterella Semenov, 1904

= Discoptera =

Genus of beetles

Discoptera is a genus in the ground beetle family Carabidae. There are about five described species in Discoptera.

== Species ==
These five species belong to the genus Discoptera:

- Discoptera arabica Fairmaire, 1896 (Egypt, Israel, Saudi Arabia)
- Discoptera eylandi Semenov, 1889 (Turkmenistan)
- Discoptera komarowi Semenov, 1889 (Turkmenistan)
- Discoptera przewalskii Semenov, 1889 (China)
- Discoptera tschitscherini Semenov, 1895 (Turkmenistan)
