= Lophidius =

Scientific classification
- Kingdom: Animalia
- Phylum: Arthropoda
- Class: Insecta
- Order: Coleoptera
- Suborder: Adephaga
- Family: Carabidae
- Tribe: Cyclosomini
- Subtribe: Masoreina
- Genus: Lophidius; Dejean, 1831
- Species: L. testaceus

Binomial name
- Lophidius testaceus Dejean, 1831

Genus of beetles

Lophidius is a genus in the ground beetle family Carabidae. This genus has a single species, Lophidius testaceus. It is found in Africa.
