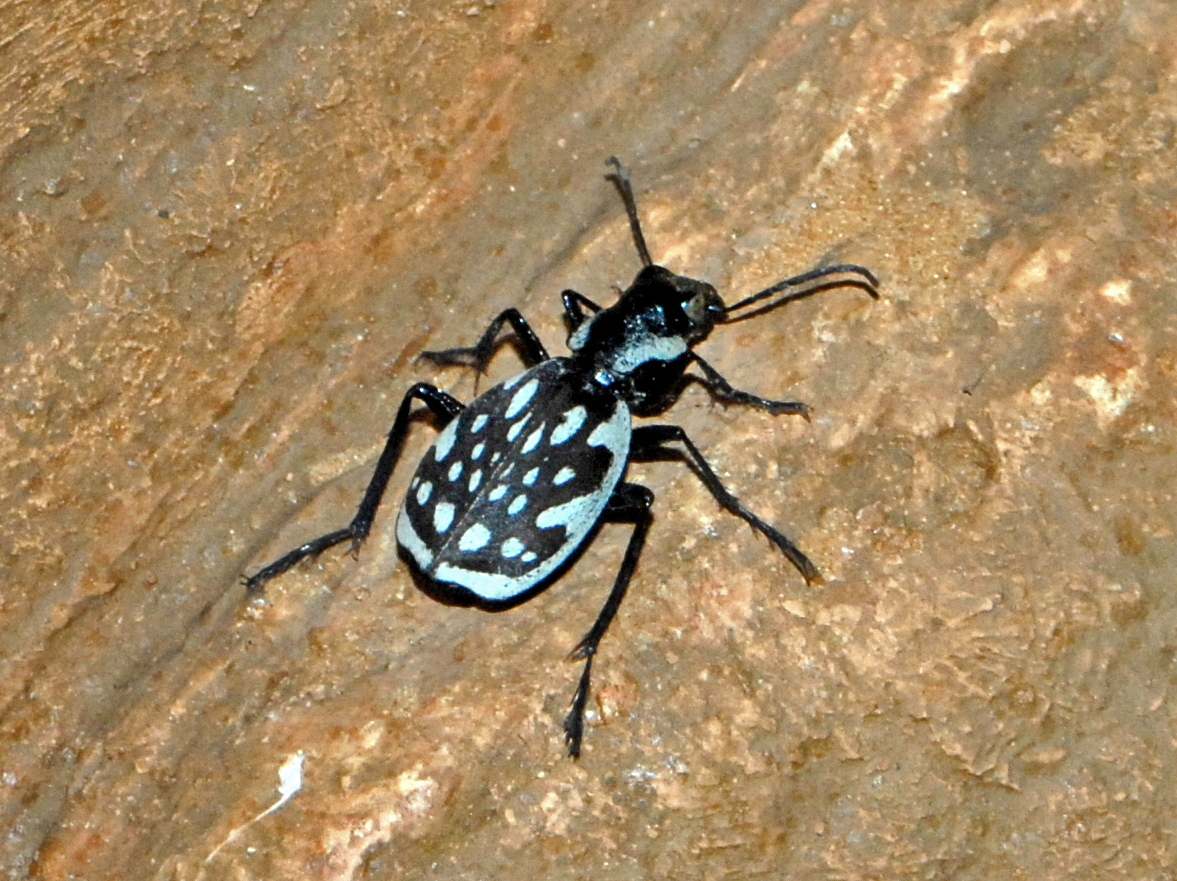

Scientific classification
- Domain: Eukaryota
- Kingdom: Animalia
- Phylum: Arthropoda
- Class: Insecta
- Order: Coleoptera
- Suborder: Adephaga
- Family: Carabidae
- Genus: Graphipterus
- Species: G. serrator

Binomial name
- Graphipterus serrator Forskal, 1775

= Graphipterus serrator =

Species of beetle

Graphipterus serrator is a species of beetles in the family Carabidae.

== Subspecies ==
- Graphipterus serrator heydeni Kraatz, 1890
- Graphipterus serrator serrator Forsskål, 1775
- Graphipterus serrator valdanii Guérin-Méneville, 1859

== Description ==
Graphipterus serrator can reach a length of 10–20 millimetres (0.39–0.79 in). This ground beetle is quite variable in the body size and in the development of the spots. Larvae in the preimaginal stage have myrmecophagous habits. They make chambers inside the ant nest where they store the ant brood.

== Distribution and habitat ==
This species is widespread in North Africa from Egypt to Mauritania. It lives in African savannas and semideserts.
