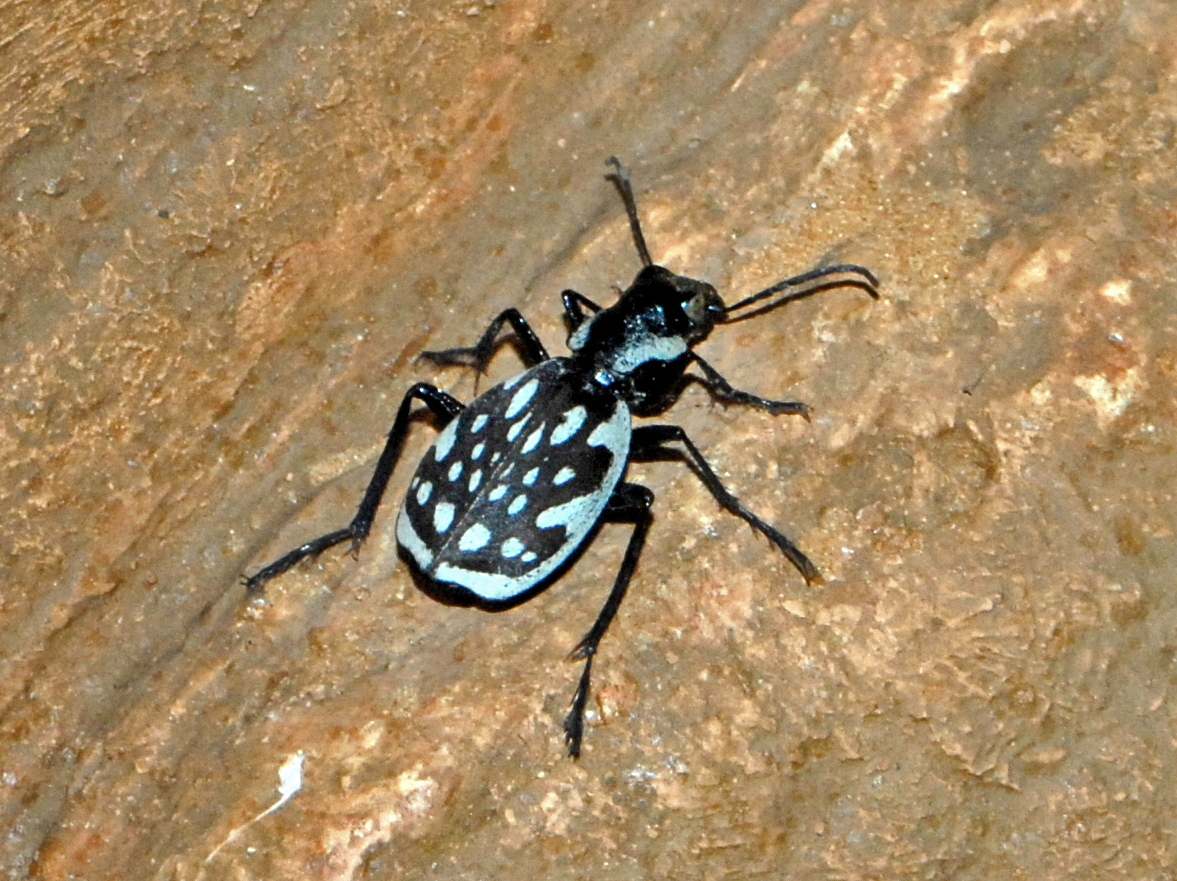
- Graphipterus serrator

Scientific classification
- Kingdom: Animalia
- Phylum: Arthropoda
- Class: Insecta
- Order: Coleoptera
- Suborder: Adephaga
- Family: Carabidae
- Subfamily: Lebiinae
- Tribe: Cyclosomini
- Subtribe: Graphipterina
- Genus: Graphipterus; Latreille, 1802

= Graphipterus =

Genus of beetles

Graphipterus is a genus in the beetle family Carabidae. There are more than 150 described species in Graphipterus. Most species are found in Africa, with a few from the Middle East.

== Species ==
These 153 species belong to the genus Graphipterus:

- Graphipterus albolineatus (Wallengren, 1881) (Zambia, Zimbabwe, Botswana, South Africa)
- Graphipterus albomarginatus Quedenfeldt, 1883 (Angola and Zimbabwe)
- Graphipterus alluaudi Basilewsky, 1977 (Kenya and Tanzania)
- Graphipterus alternatus Burgeon, 1928 (Angola)
- Graphipterus amabilis Boheman, 1860 (Angola, Zimbabwe, Botswana, Namibia, South Africa)
- Graphipterus amicus Péringuey, 1892 (Namibia)
- Graphipterus ancora Dejean, 1831 (Mozambique, Zimbabwe, Botswana, Namibia, South Africa)
- Graphipterus andersoni Chaudoir, 1870 (Angola, Zimbabwe, Botswana, Namibia)
- Graphipterus angolanus Basilewsky, 1977 (Angola)
- Graphipterus angustus Péringuey, 1888 (South Africa)
- Graphipterus arrowi Burgeon, 1928 (Kenya)
- Graphipterus assimilis Péringuey, 1896 (South Africa)
- Graphipterus atrimedius Chaudoir, 1870 (Zimbabwe, Botswana, Namibia, South Africa)
- Graphipterus babaulti Basilewsky, 1977 (Kenya)
- Graphipterus barthelemyi Dejean, 1830 (Tunisia)
- Graphipterus basalis Péringuey, 1896 (Mozambique)
- Graphipterus basilewskyi Werner, 2003 (Kenya)
- Graphipterus basivittatus Basilewsky, 1977 (Namibia)
- Graphipterus bilineatus Boheman, 1860 (Zimbabwe, Botswana, Namibia, South Africa)
- Graphipterus bivittatus Boheman, 1848 (Angola, Botswana, Namibia)
- Graphipterus bonvouloiri Chaudoir, 1870 (Mozambique and South Africa)
- Graphipterus brunellii G.Müller, 1941 (Somalia)
- Graphipterus calcaratus Obst, 1908 (Namibia)
- Graphipterus castanopterus Fairmaire, 1884 (Djibouti, Somalia, Uganda)
- Graphipterus chaudoiri Péringuey, 1888 (Botswana and South Africa)
- Graphipterus cicindeloides (Swederus, 1787) (Namibia and South Africa)
- Graphipterus cinctus Chaudoir, 1883 (Angola, Namibia, South Africa)
- Graphipterus cineraceus Fairmaire, 1882 (Somalia)
- Graphipterus cinerarius Fairmaire, 1894 (South Africa)
- Graphipterus circumcinctus (Boheman, 1848) (Botswana and South Africa)
- Graphipterus circumdatus Raffray, 1886 (Yemen, Eritrea, Djibouti, Somalia)
- Graphipterus clarkei Basilewsky, 1977 (Ethiopia)
- Graphipterus congoensis Burgeon, 1928 (Democratic Republic of the Congo and Angola)
- Graphipterus cordiger Dejean, 1831 (Africa)
- Graphipterus crampeli Alluaud, 1915 (Africa)
- Graphipterus cursor Péringuey, 1888 (South Africa)
- Graphipterus damarensis Péringuey, 1896 (Namibia)
- Graphipterus deceptor Péringuey, 1892 (Namibia)
- Graphipterus decipiatus Basilewsky, 1977 (South Africa)
- Graphipterus discicollis Fairmaire, 1884 (Somalia and Kenya)
- Graphipterus dissimilis Basilewsky, 1986 (South Africa)
- Graphipterus dolosus Basilewsky, 1977 (Zimbabwe, Botswana, South Africa)
- Graphipterus dukei Basilewsky, 1986 (South Africa)
- Graphipterus duvivieri Burgeon, 1929 (Democratic Republic of the Congo, Tanzania, Zambia)
- Graphipterus dymorphus Burgeon, 1928 (Democratic Republic of the Congo and Tanzania)
- Graphipterus ellipticus Burgeon, 1928 (Democratic Republic of the Congo, Tanzania, Zambia)
- Graphipterus endroedyi Basilewsky, 1977 (South Africa)
- Graphipterus erikssoni Péringuey, 1892 (Angola and Namibia)
- Graphipterus erlangeri Basilewsky, 1977 (Kenya)
- Graphipterus erraticus Basilewsky, 1977 (Somalia)
- Graphipterus exclamationifer Burgeon, 1928 (Malawi and Mozambique)
- Graphipterus exclamationis (Fabricius, 1792) (Morocco, Algeria, Tunisia)
- Graphipterus fallaciosus Basilewsky, 1986 (South Africa)
- Graphipterus fasciatus Chaudoir, 1870 (Mozambique and South Africa)
- Graphipterus femoratus Chevrolat, 1835 (South Africa)
- Graphipterus fritschi Chaudoir, 1883 (Zimbabwe, Botswana, South Africa)
- Graphipterus frontalis Boheman, 1848 (South Africa)
- Graphipterus galla Gestro, 1895 (Eritrea)
- Graphipterus geminatus Péringuey, 1896 (Zimbabwe)
- Graphipterus gestroi Alluaud, 1923 (Somalia)
- Graphipterus gilli Burgeon, 1929 (Mozambique)
- Graphipterus griseolineatus Burgeon, 1928 (Democratic Republic of the Congo)
- Graphipterus griseus Chaudoir, 1870 (South Africa)
- Graphipterus hammondi Basilewsky, 1977 (Angola)
- Graphipterus hessei Burgeon, 1929 (Namibia and South Africa)
- Graphipterus heydeni Kraatz, 1890 (Tunisia and Libya)
- Graphipterus holmi Basilewsky, 1986 (South Africa)
- Graphipterus horni Burgeon, 1928 (Tanzania)
- Graphipterus incanus Dejean, 1831 (Botswana and South Africa)
- Graphipterus insidiosus Péringuey, 1896 (Mozambique and South Africa)
- Graphipterus interlineatus Alluaud, 1927 (Kenya and Tanzania)
- Graphipterus jubae Alluaud, 1923 (Somalia)
- Graphipterus katangae Burgeon, 1929 (Democratic Republic of the Congo and Zambia)
- Graphipterus kochi Basilewsky, 1956 (Namibia)
- Graphipterus laevisignatus Basilewsky, 1986 (South Africa)
- Graphipterus langheldi Kuntzen, 1919 (Namibia)
- Graphipterus lateralis Boheman, 1848 (Africa)
- Graphipterus laticollis Harold, 1878 (Africa)
- Graphipterus limbatus Laporte, 1840 (Africa)
- Graphipterus lineelus Péringuey, 1896 (Africa)
- Graphipterus lineolatus (Boheman, 1848) (Africa)
- Graphipterus longulus Burgeon, 1929 (Tanzania and Malawi)
- Graphipterus lorenzi Werner, 2007 (Zambia)
- Graphipterus louwi Basilewsky, 1977 (Namibia)
- Graphipterus luctuosus Dejean, 1825 (Algeria, Tunisia, Libya)
- Graphipterus lugens Chaudoir, 1870 (Angola, Botswana, Namibia)
- Graphipterus macrocephalus Boheman, 1848 (South Africa)
- Graphipterus magnus Renan & Assmann, 2018 (Egypt)
- Graphipterus marginatus Boheman, 1860 (Zimbabwe, Botswana, Namibia, South Africa)
- Graphipterus marshalli Burgeon, 1928 (Democratic Republic of the Congo, Uganda, Tanzania)
- Graphipterus mashunus Péringuey, 1896 (Zimbabwe)
- Graphipterus mauretensis Renan & Assmann, 2018 (Mauretania)
- Graphipterus michaelseni Kuntzen, 1919 (Namibia)
- Graphipterus minutus Latreille & Dejean, 1824 (Middle East, Iran)
- Graphipterus miskelli Basilewsky, 1981 (Somalia)
- Graphipterus mouffleti Chaudoir, 1870 (Angola)
- Graphipterus multiguttatus (Olivier, 1790) (Egypt, Israel, Jordan)
- Graphipterus namanus Basilewsky, 1977 (Namibia)
- Graphipterus nanniscus Péringuey, 1896 (Zimbabwe)
- Graphipterus neavei Burgeon, 1928 (Tanzania and Zambia)
- Graphipterus njarassae Basilewsky, 1977 (Tanzania)
- Graphipterus nyassicus Burgeon, 1928 (Tanzania, Zambia, Malawi)
- Graphipterus obliteratus Boheman, 1860 (Namibia)
- Graphipterus obsoletus (Olivier, 1795) (Africa)
- Graphipterus omophractus Basilewsky, 1977 (Kenya)
- Graphipterus ornatus Péringuey, 1892 (Zambia and Namibia)
- Graphipterus patrizii Alluaud, 1923 (Somalia and Kenya)
- Graphipterus peletieri Laporte, 1840 (Morocco and Algeria)
- Graphipterus penrithae Basilewsky, 1977 (Namibia)
- Graphipterus piniamitaii Renan & Freidberg, 2018 (Tunisia)
- Graphipterus plagiatus Boheman, 1848 (Botswana and South Africa)
- Graphipterus plesius Basilewsky, 1977 (Somalia)
- Graphipterus plurifasciatus Basilewsky, 1977 (Angola)
- Graphipterus pronitens Basilewsky, 1977 (Angola and Namibia)
- Graphipterus provitiosus Basilewsky, 1977 (Namibia)
- Graphipterus pseudofrontalis Burgeon, 1929 (Namibia)
- Graphipterus reymondi Antoine, 1953 (Morocco)
- Graphipterus rhodesianus Burgeon, 1928 (Zimbabwe)
- Graphipterus rotundatus Klug, 1832 (Algeria, Tunisia, Libya)
- Graphipterus salinae Bertoloni, 1849 (Africa)
- Graphipterus samburuensis Burgeon, 1928 (Kenya and Tanzania)
- Graphipterus sennariensis Laporte, 1835 (Africa)
- Graphipterus serrator (Forskål, 1775) (Egypt and Israel)
- Graphipterus sexvittatus Chaudoir, 1870 (Mozambique and South Africa)
- Graphipterus sharonae Renan & Assmann, 2018 (Egypt and Israel)
- Graphipterus simillimus Basilewsky, 1977 (Namibia and South Africa)
- Graphipterus snizeki Werner, 2007 (Zambia)
- Graphipterus somereni Basilewsky, 1977 (Kenya)
- Graphipterus soricinus Fairmaire, 1882 (Somalia)
- Graphipterus speculifer Burgeon, 1928 (Tanzania)
- Graphipterus stagonopsis Renan & Assmann, 2018 (Algeria)
- Graphipterus sublimbatus Basilewsky, 1977 (Namibia and South Africa)
- Graphipterus subsuturalis Basilewsky, 1977 (Namibia and South Africa)
- Graphipterus suspectus Péringuey, 1896 (South Africa)
- Graphipterus suturalis Boheman, 1860 (Botswana, Namibia, South Africa)
- Graphipterus suturiger Chaudoir, 1870 (Botswana and Namibia)
- Graphipterus tellinii G.Müller, 1941 (Eritrea)
- Graphipterus tibialis Chaudoir, 1870 (Botswana and Namibia)
- Graphipterus tichyi Werner, 2007 (Zambia)
- Graphipterus trilineatus (Fabricius, 1787) (South Africa)
- Graphipterus tristis Klug, 1853 (Africa)
- Graphipterus tuky Basilewsky, 1937 (Namibia and South Africa)
- Graphipterus upembanus Basilewsky, 1953 (Africa)
- Graphipterus valdanii Guérin-Méneville, 1859 (Algeria)
- Graphipterus velox Péringuey, 1888 (Angola and Namibia)
- Graphipterus velutinus Boheman, 1848 (Africa)
- Graphipterus vestitus Dejean, 1831 (Zimbabwe and South Africa)
- Graphipterus vignai Giachino; Allegro & Sciaky, 2021 (Zambia)
- Graphipterus vittatus Dejean, 1831 (South Africa)
- Graphipterus vitticollis G.Müller, 1938 (Somalia)
- Graphipterus vittiger Péringuey, 1888 (Zambia and South Africa)
- Graphipterus voltae Basilewsky, 1943 (Africa)
- Graphipterus youngai Basilewsky, 1986 (Namibia)
