= Cyclosomus =

Scientific classification
- Kingdom: Animalia
- Phylum: Arthropoda
- Class: Insecta
- Order: Coleoptera
- Suborder: Adephaga
- Family: Carabidae
- Subfamily: Lebiinae
- Tribe: Cyclosomini
- Subtribe: Cyclosomina
- Genus: Cyclosomus; Latreille, 1829

Synonyms
- Cyclosoma Girard, 1873

Genus of beetles

Cyclosomus is a genus in the ground beetle family Carabidae. There are about 11 described species in Cyclosomus. They are found in southern and southeastern Asia and Africa.

== Species ==
These 11 species belong to the genus Cyclosomus:

- Cyclosomus basalis Kolbe, 1897 (Tanzania, Malawi, Mozambique)
- Cyclosomus buquetii Dejean, 1831 (Africa)
- Cyclosomus collarti Burgeon, 1931 (Nigeria, Cameroon, Sudan, Somalia, DR Congo)
- Cyclosomus equestris Boheman, 1848 (DR Congo, Kenya, Tanzania, Malawi, Zimbabwe, Madagascar)
- Cyclosomus flexuosus (Fabricius, 1775) (China, Sudan, Sri Lanka, India, Laos, Vietnam)
- Cyclosomus inustus Andrewes, 1924 (China, India, Laos)
- Cyclosomus madecassus Fairmaire, 1898 (Madagascar)
- Cyclosomus philippinus Heller, 1923 (Philippines)
- Cyclosomus rousseaui Dupuis, 1912 (Sierra Leone, Sudan, Gabon, DR Congo)
- Cyclosomus sumatrensis Bouchard, 1903 (Indonesia)
- Cyclosomus suturalis (Wiedemann, 1819) (India, Myanmar, Laos, Vietnam)
