= Trichopiezia =

Trichopiezia stenotrachela

Scientific classification
- Kingdom: Animalia
- Phylum: Arthropoda
- Class: Insecta
- Order: Coleoptera
- Suborder: Adephaga
- Family: Carabidae
- Subfamily: Lebiinae
- Genus: Trichopiezia; Negre, 1955
- Species: T. stenotrachela

Binomial name
- Trichopiezia stenotrachela (Fairmaire, 1884)

Genus of beetles

Trichopiezia stenotrachela is a species of beetles in the family Carabidae, the only species in the genus Trichopiezia.
