= Nemotarsus =

Scientific classification
- Kingdom: Animalia
- Phylum: Arthropoda
- Class: Insecta
- Order: Coleoptera
- Suborder: Adephaga
- Family: Carabidae
- Tribe: Lebiini
- Genus: Nemotarsus; LeConte, 1853

Genus of beetles

Nemotarsus is a genus of beetles in the family Carabidae, containing the following species:

- Nemotarsus disciger (Chaudoir, 1876)
- Nemotarsus elegans Leconte, 1853
- Nemotarsus fallax (Dejean, 1831)
- Nemotarsus interruptus (Chaudoir, 1876)
- Nemotarsus limbicollis Bates, 1883
- Nemotarsus rhombifer Bates, 1883
- Nemotarsus scutellaris (Chaudoir, 1876)
- Nemotarsus sellatus (Emden, 1958)
- Nemotarsus titschacki (Liebke, 1951)
