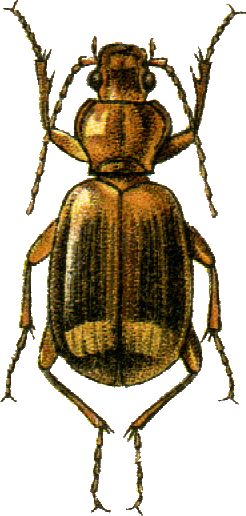
- Hypercosmeton callistoides Jacobson

Scientific classification
- Kingdom: Animalia
- Phylum: Arthropoda
- Class: Insecta
- Order: Coleoptera
- Suborder: Adephaga
- Family: Carabidae
- Subfamily: Lebiinae
- Genus: Mnuphorus; Chaudoir, 1873

= Mnuphorus =

Genus of beetles

Mnuphorus is a genus of beetles in the family Carabidae, containing the following species:

- Mnuphorus albomaculatus Ballion, 1871
- Mnuphorus baeckmanni Semenov, 1926
- Mnuphorus callistoides Reitter, 1889
- Mnuphorus cyrtus Glasunov, 1913
- Mnuphorus iliensis Glasunov, 1913
- Mnuphorus jakowlewi Semenov, 1891
- Mnuphorus sellatus Gebler, 1843
- Mnuphorus semenovi Glasunov, 1913
- Mnuphorus tetraspilus Solsky, 1874
