= Hexachaetus =

Scientific classification
- Domain: Eukaryota
- Kingdom: Animalia
- Phylum: Arthropoda
- Class: Insecta
- Order: Coleoptera
- Suborder: Adephaga
- Family: Carabidae
- Subfamily: Orthogoniinae
- Tribe: Orthogoniini
- Subtribe: Orthogoniina
- Genus: Hexachaetus; Chaudoir, 1872

Genus of beetles

Hexachaetus is a genus in the beetle family Carabidae. There are about 12 described species in Hexachaetus, found in Southeast Asia.

== Species ==
These 12 species belong to the genus Hexachaetus:

- Hexachaetus angulatus (Schmidt-Goebel, 1846) (Myanmar, Laos, Vietnam, Malaysia, and Indonesia)
- Hexachaetus brunki Tian & Deuve, 2016 (Malaysia, Indonesia, and Borneo)
- Hexachaetus kirschenhoferi Tian & Deuve, 2016 (Indonesia and Borneo)
- Hexachaetus laevissimus Chaudoir, 1878 (Myanmar, Malaysia, Indonesia, and Borneo)
- Hexachaetus lateralis (Guérin-Méneville, 1843) (Malaysia, Indonesia, and Borneo)
- Hexachaetus maculatus Tian & Deuve, 2004 (Indonesia)
- Hexachaetus mulan Tian & Deuve, 2016 (Malaysia)
- Hexachaetus perroti Tian & Deuve, 2006 (Vietnam)
- Hexachaetus prodigus Tian & Deuve, 2006 (Vietnam)
- Hexachaetus taylorae Tian & Deuve, 2006 (Myanmar)
- Hexachaetus tristis Liebke, 1937 (Indonesia)
- Hexachaetus vietnamensis Tian & Deuve, 2016 (Vietnam)
