= Neoorthogonius =

Neoorthogonius orientalis

Scientific classification
- Kingdom: Animalia
- Phylum: Arthropoda
- Class: Insecta
- Order: Coleoptera
- Suborder: Adephaga
- Family: Carabidae
- Subfamily: Orthogoniinae
- Genus: Neoorthogonius; Tian & Deuve, 2006
- Species: N. orientalis

Binomial name
- Neoorthogonius orientalis Tian & Deuve, 2006

Genus of beetles

Neoorthogonius orientalis is a species of beetles in the family Carabidae, the only species in the genus Neoorthogonius.
