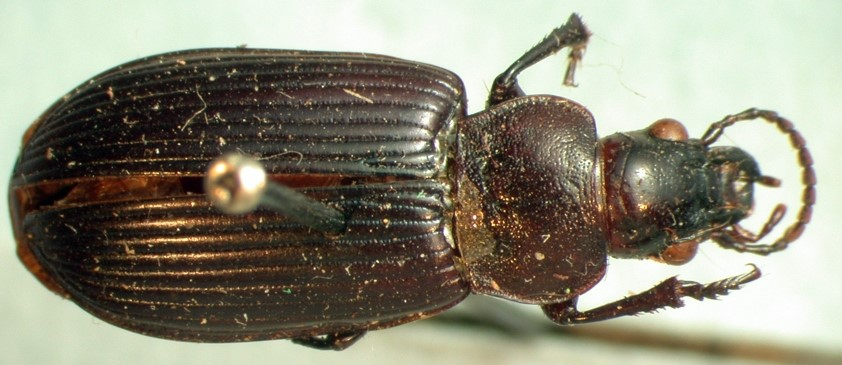
- Strigia maxillaris

Scientific classification
- Domain: Eukaryota
- Kingdom: Animalia
- Phylum: Arthropoda
- Class: Insecta
- Order: Coleoptera
- Suborder: Adephaga
- Family: Carabidae
- Subfamily: Orthogoniinae
- Tribe: Idiomorphini
- Subtribe: Idiomorphina
- Genus: Strigia; Brullé, 1835

Synonyms
- Selenidia Motschulsky, 1855

= Strigia =

Genus of beetles

Strigia is a genus in the ground beetle family Carabidae. There are at least three described species in Strigia.

== Species ==
These three species belong to the genus Strigia:

- Strigia atra (Chaudoir, 1878) (India)
- Strigia maxillaris Brullé, 1835 (Pakistan, India)
- Strigia stigma (Fabricius, 1801) (Bangladesh, India)
