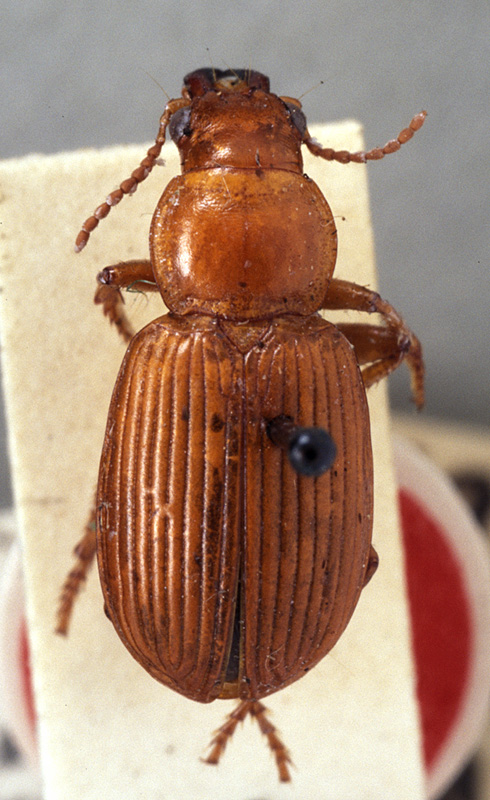
- Idiomorphus xanthochrous

Scientific classification
- Domain: Eukaryota
- Kingdom: Animalia
- Phylum: Arthropoda
- Class: Insecta
- Order: Coleoptera
- Suborder: Adephaga
- Family: Carabidae
- Subfamily: Orthogoniinae
- Tribe: Idiomorphini
- Subtribe: Idiomorphina
- Genus: Idiomorphus; Chaudoir, 1846

Synonyms
- Marschneria Jedlicka, 1960

= Idiomorphus =

Genus of beetles

Idiomorphus is a genus in the ground beetle family Carabidae. There are at least three described species in Idiomorphus.

== Species ==
These three species belong to the genus Idiomorphus:

- Idiomorphus guerini Chaudoir, 1846 (Sri Lanka, India)
- Idiomorphus mirabilis (Jedlicka, 1960) (China)
- Idiomorphus xanthochrous Britton, 1937 (Malawi, Zimbabwe, South Africa)
