= Actenoncus foersteri =

Scientific classification
- Kingdom: Animalia
- Phylum: Arthropoda
- Clade: Pancrustacea
- Class: Insecta
- Order: Coleoptera
- Suborder: Adephaga
- Family: Carabidae
- Subfamily: Orthogoniinae
- Tribe: Orthogoniini
- Subtribe: Orthogoniina
- Genus: Actenoncus
- Species: A. foersteri

Binomial name
- Actenoncus foersteri (Andrewes, 1931)

Synonyms
- Orthogonius foersteri Andrewes, 1931

Species of beetle

Actenoncus foersteri is a species in the beetle family Carabidae. It is found in Indonesia.
