= Actenoncus =

Scientific classification
- Kingdom: Animalia
- Phylum: Arthropoda
- Clade: Pancrustacea
- Class: Insecta
- Order: Coleoptera
- Suborder: Adephaga
- Family: Carabidae
- Subfamily: Orthogoniinae
- Tribe: Orthogoniini
- Subtribe: Orthogoniina
- Genus: Actenoncus; Chaudoir, 1872

Genus of beetles

Actenoncus is a genus of in the beetle family Carabidae. There are at least four described species in Actenoncus, found in Southeast Asia.

== Species ==
These four species belong to the genus Actenoncus:

- Actenoncus ater (Laporte, 1835) (Thailand, Indonesia, Borneo, and Philippines)
- Actenoncus foersteri (Andrewes, 1931) (Indonesia)
- Actenoncus punctatus Tian & Deuve, 2006 (Indonesia and Borneo)
- Actenoncus wallacei Tian & Deuve, 2009 (Indonesia)
